= Alexander the Great's trust in Doctor Philip =

Painting by Polish painter Henryk Siemiradzki

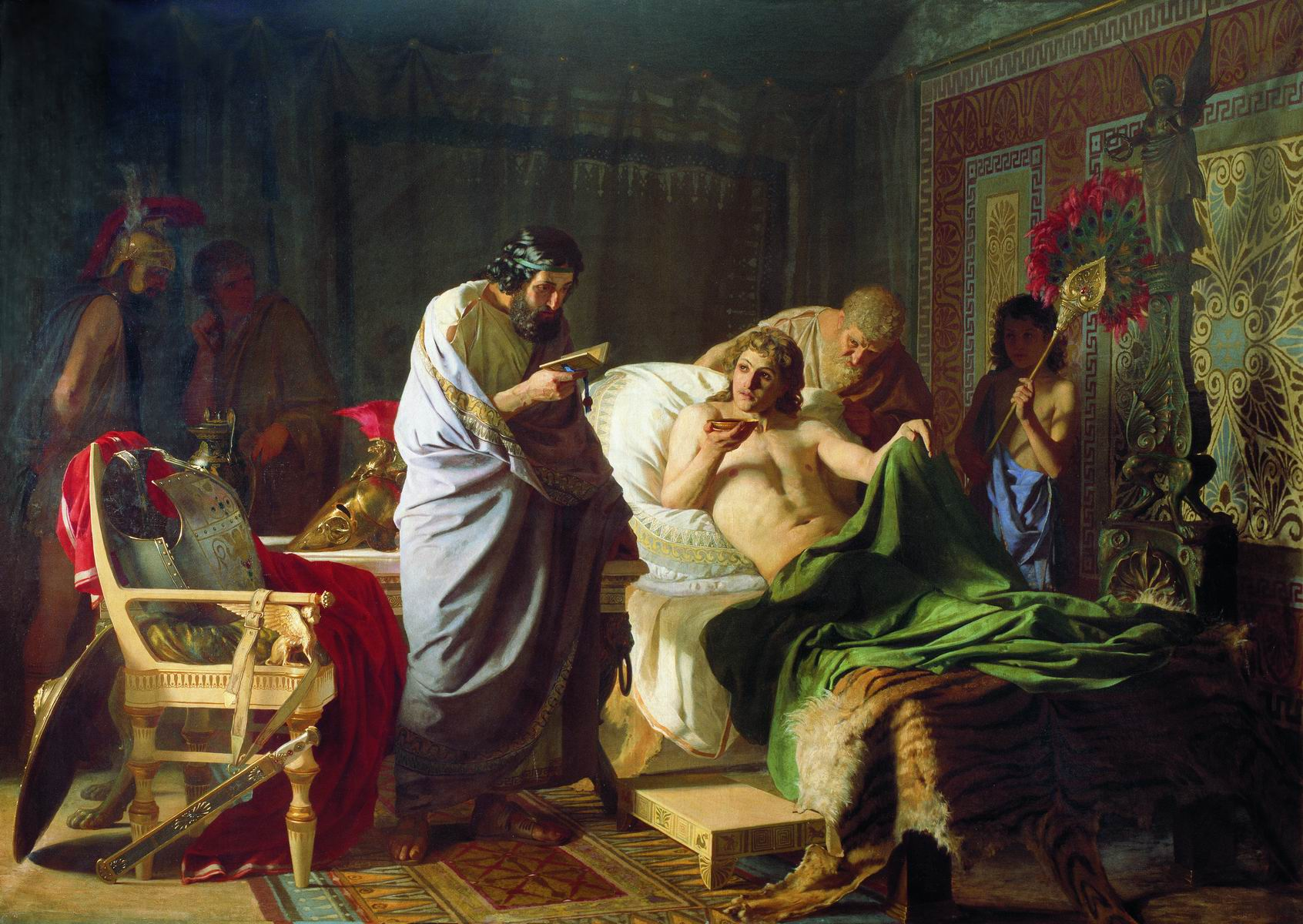
- Artist: Henryk Siemiradzki
- Year: 1870
- Medium: Oil on canvas
- Dimensions: 245 cm × 346,5 cm (96 in × 1,364 in)
- Location: National Art Museum of the Republic of Belarus, Minsk

The painting Alexander the Great's trust in Doctor Philip was created by Polish and Russian academic artist Henryk Siemiradzki (1843-1902) in 1870. It is held in the National Art Museum of the Republic of Belarus in Minsk (Inventory No. RZh-712). The dimensions of the painting are 245 × 346.5 cm. The painting depicts the seriously ill Alexander the Great, who is about to drink a medicine prepared by his physician Philip of Acarnania, who is standing next to his bed.

The painting was created as a result of a theme proposed as part of a competition at the Imperial Academy of Arts in early 1870. In the autumn of the same year, the works of Siemiradzki and his competitors were completed and exhibited at the academic exhibition held in St Petersburg. The results of the competition were announced in November 1870, following a unanimous decision by the members of the Academy's Council. Siemiradzki was declared the winner and awarded the big gold medal of the first merit, entitling him to a six-year pensioner's trip abroad at the expense of the Academy of Arts.

In the painting, art critic Vladimir Stasov pointed out "taste, strength, skill and extreme completeness in general", as well as the artist's conscientious study of the achievements of modern history and archaeology. He considered this painting to be an indication that Siemiradzki "has a brilliant future". Art historian Tatyana Karpova considered such distinctive features as "elegance of lines, clear silhouettes of figures, harmonious colouring" to be the merits of the canvas. Art historian Pavel Klimov posited that with this work the artist "showed to himself and to others that he has fully mastered the technical tools and is ready to embark on an independent road".

== History ==
=== Background and academic contest ===
Between 1864 and 1870, Henryk Siemiradzki undertook his studies at the Academy of Arts in St Petersburg. Initially, he was a free listener until April 1866, after which he became a permanent pupil. His mentors were Carl Wenig and Bogdan Willewalde. In the 1866-1867 academic year, Siemiradzki was awarded one small and two big silver medals for drawings and studies from nature. In 1868, he was awarded the Small Gold Medal of the Academy of Arts for his painting Diogenes Shattering the Bowl. The plot of this painting was based on one of the stories from the life of the ancient Greek philosopher Diogenes. This award granted him the right to participate in the competition for the big gold medal.

The theme of the competition for the large gold medal was announced in early 1870: "Alexander the Great's trust in Doctor Philip during a serious illness". It was not the first academic competition on a similar theme. In 1830, historical painters were given the following task: "To depict Alexander the Great at the moment when he, being in illness and having received a delation, as if his doctor Philip wants to poison him, not trusting this delation, takes from Philip the medicine, and drinks it, meanwhile handing to Philip the marked delation for reading." The gold medal of the second merit in the 1830 competition was awarded to the artist Jan Ksawery Kaniewski for his painting entitled Alexander the Great's Confidence in his Physician Philip. Furthermore, in 1836, Taras Shevchenko, who was then pursuing his studies in St. Petersburg, created a drawing on this theme.

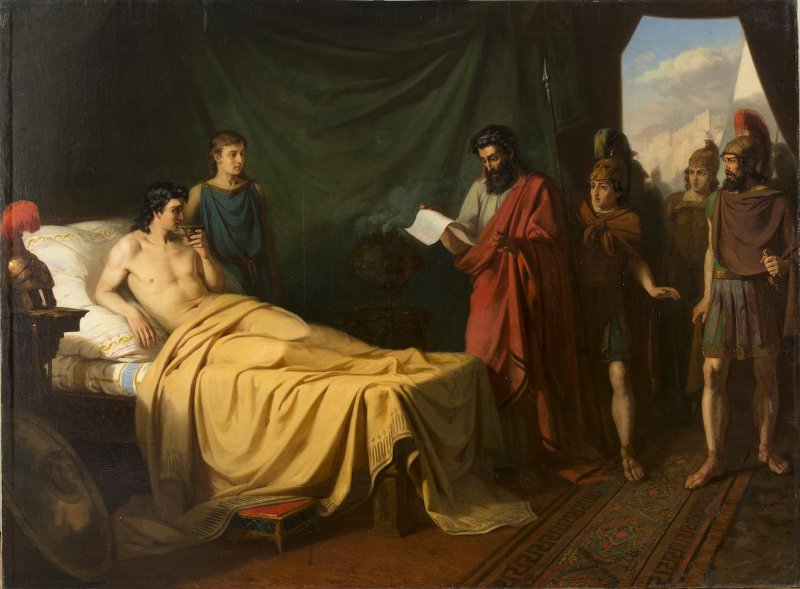
M. P. Vereshchagin. Confidence of Alexander the Great in his physician Philip during grave illness (1870, State Russian Museum)

In a letter dated 24 January 1870, (Note: The Julian calendar ("old style") is used to date events that took place in the Russian Empire.) Siemiradzki wrote to his family: "At last we have been given a theme for the big gold medal, it is without doubt better than Diogenes; it is an episode from the life of Alexander the Great". Another student of the Academy, Mitrofan Vereshchagin, also created a painting on the same theme. In addition, a number of other painters participated in the competition, with a total of five or six paintings submitted. According to some reports, there were simultaneous competitions for both the big and small gold medals on the same theme. Mitrofan Vereshchagin was on the list of candidates for the small medal, while Mikhail Zelensky competed for the big medal alongside Henryk Siemiradzki. It is also known that reliefs on the same theme were submitted by sculptors including Alexander Snigirevsky and Pyotr Dylyov.

Upon the announcement of the theme, the initial task for the contestants was to present a sketch of the future composition. They were required to work on their sketches in complete isolation, with no opportunity to leave their place of work. Additionally, they were provided with food and tea. Once the sketch was complete, it was reviewed and approved by the management of the Academy of Arts, and subsequently retained as a document that could not be altered. The paintings were created in specially designated workshops, in strict secrecy, with the artists effectively "under house arrest". Only those with a legitimate reason to be present in the workshops, namely the teachers on duty and the model painters who arrived at the scheduled times, were permitted to enter.

In March 1870, the studio where Siemiradzki was working on the painting was visited by Grand Duke Vladimir Alexandrovich, who from 1869 had been a fellow president of the Academy of Arts and in 1876 became its president. In a letter to his relatives dated 5 April 1870, Siemiradzki reported that two weeks prior, Vladimir Alexandrovich had "asked a few questions about the work he had started, what the tent over Alexander the Great would be, looked at the sketches, looked at some books lying on the table and left, wishing me a successful completion of the work". As he was engaged in the production of the competition painting, Siemiradzki's financial situation deteriorated, as he had to give up private commissions, which had previously constituted a substantial source of his income. On 15 September 1870, he submitted an application to the Academy of Arts requesting financial assistance to pay off his debts. His petition was successful, and he was granted a sum of 300 roubles.

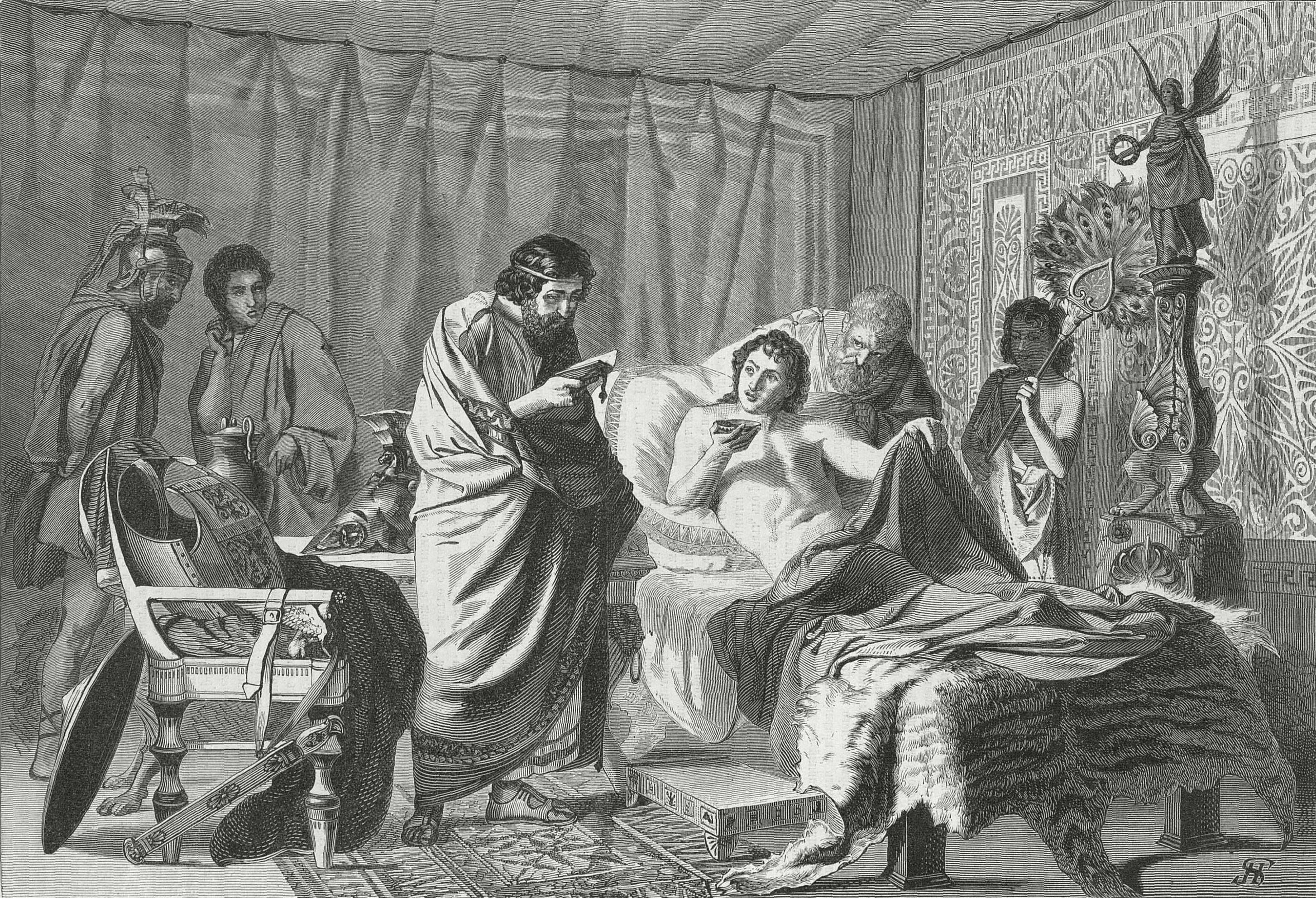
L. A. Seriakov. Alexander the Great's trust in Doctor Philip (engraving of Siemiradzki's painting, 1870)

In the autumn of 1870, the competition paintings by Henryk Siemiradzki and Mitrofan Vereshchagin were shown at an exhibition at the Academy of Arts, which included works created for the diplomas as well as other works. In a letter to his parents dated 4 September 1870, Siemiradzki reported that two days prior, he had already installed his canvas in the hall where the exhibition was to be held - "in a gilded frame and on a dark-coloured wall looks very good". The artist wrote that he was still finalising the painting "on the spot, standing on the stairs". He stated that the exhibition was due to open at the end of September. During the exhibition, an engraved reproduction of Siemiradzki's painting was published by the journal Vsemirnaya Illyustratsiya (1870, No. 100, p. 809). The engraving was created by the artist Lavrentiy Seryakov. Art critic Vladimir Stasov wrote a review of the academic exhibition, praising both Siemiradzki's competition painting and the young artist's potential: "First of all, it seems to me, we should give Siemiradzki the big gold medal and send this artist abroad as soon as possible. For many reasons, it seems to me that this artist has a brilliant future ahead of him". Other critics, in particular Pavel Kovalevsky, offered generally positive appraisals of Siemiradzki's painting.

The results of the competition were announced on 4 November 1870. By unanimous decision of the members of the Academy's Council, Siemiradzki was declared the winner and awarded a big gold medal of the first merit. The artist was delighted with his success, writing: "It was one of the most solemn days of my life. The examination was extremely rigorous; of those who worked with me, no one received a [big gold] medal except me". The likelihood of Siemiradzki being a favourite of the competition was already apparent even before its conclusion. In a letter written by the artist to his parents at the end of October, he stated: "In a few days, i.e. on 4 November, there will finally be a ceremony with the distribution of awards, at which I will receive a medal, this is beyond any doubt; although there is nothing official, everyone knows about it." In addition to the medal, Siemiradzki was bestowed with the title of Class Artist of the First Degree, entitling him to a six-year pensioner's trip abroad at the expense of the Academy of Arts. Mitrofan Vereshchagin was awarded a gold medal of the second degree. His painting, entitled Confidence of Alexander the Great in his physician Philip during grave illness, is currently housed in the State Russian Museum in St. Petersburg (canvas, oil, 137 × 187 cm, inv. Zh-9149).

=== Subsequent events ===
In August 1871 Siemiradzki began his overseas pensioner's trip, and from May 1872 he lived and worked in Rome. In 1873 Siemiradzki completed the large-format painting Christ and Sinner, and in 1876 a giant canvas Nero's Torches. Until 1877, he resided in Italy as a pensioner of the Academy of Arts. Thereafter, he decided not to return to Russia and remained in Rome.

In 1881, the painting entitled Alexander the Great's trust in Doctor Philip was exhibited at the Exhibition of Painting and Sculpture held in the halls of the Academy of Arts in St Petersburg. In 1882, the painting was exhibited at the All-Russian Industrial and Art Exhibition held in Moscow. A total of five works by Siemiradzki were presented in the art department of the exhibition: Alexander the Great's trust in Doctor Philip, Christ and Sinner, The Sword Dance, Orgy in the reign of Tiberius on the island of Capri and a reduced reproduction of Nero's Torches.

For an extended period, the painting Alexander the Great's trust in Doctor Philip was in the possession of the Academy of Arts. In particular, it was catalogued under this title in the 1915 Museum of the Imperial Academy of Arts catalogue of Russian paintings (number 186). This catalogue also lists seven other Siemiradzki sketches in the museum, but these were made for other works.

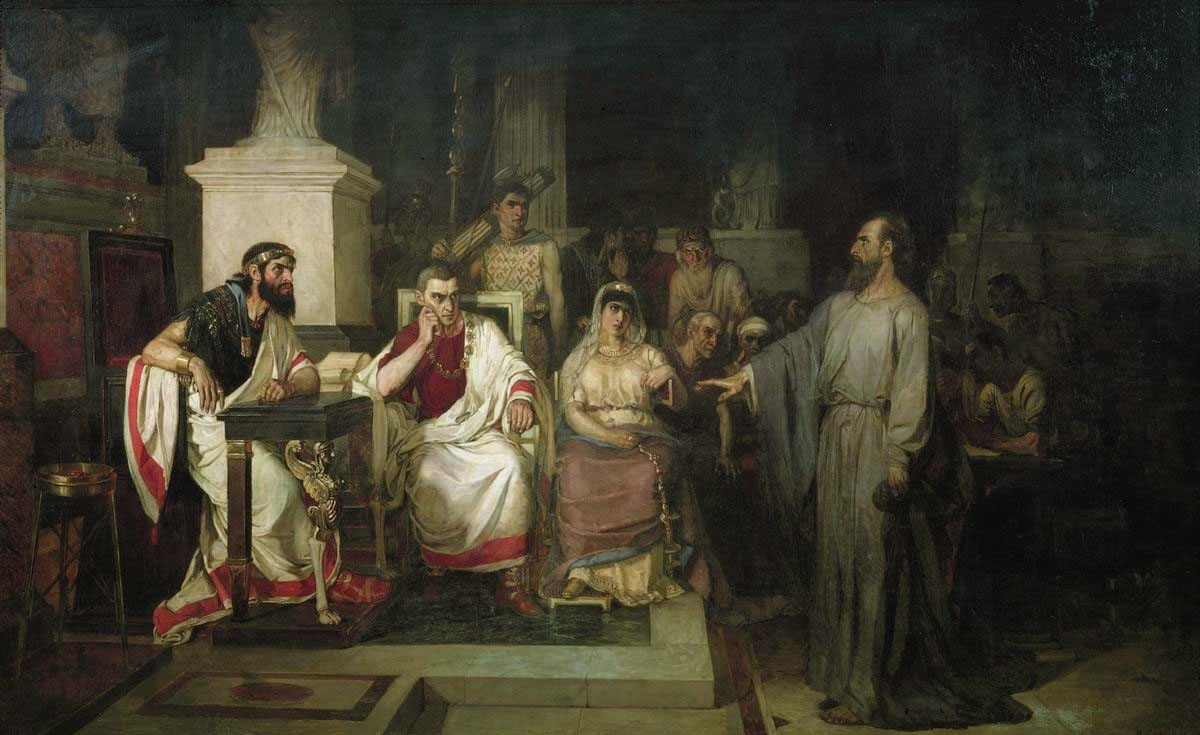
Vasily Surikov. The Apostle Paul explains the tenets of faith in the presence of King Agrippa, his sister Berenice, and the proconsul Festus (1875, State Tretyakov Gallery)

In consequence of the post-revolutionary transformations that commenced in 1918, during the early 1920s the painting, whilst remaining within the same academic museum, was allocated to the collection of the Petrograd Higher Art and Technical Institute (VKhUTEIN). In 1923, the painting was transferred to the State Russian Museum. In 1930, it was returned to the academic museum, which was now part of the Institute of Proletarian Fine Arts. In 1931, the museum was disbanded, and Siemiradzki's painting was transferred to the State Tretyakov Gallery, where it was housed until 1957. The painting is catalogued in the Tretyakov Gallery under the inventory number 20803. In the lower right corner of the canvas, another number has been written in red paint: 2355. It is possible that this is the inventory number of the Russian Museum.

In the 1950s, a new building was under construction in Minsk for the State Art Museum of the BSSR, whose director since 1944 had been Alena Aladava. The Russian Art Department's new space required the acquisition of two or three large-sized canvases to be displayed prominently on the end walls of the enfilade halls on the second floor, where they would be visible from a distance. Aladova was able to reach an agreement with the painting's owner, Klavdia Elanskaya, an actress from the Moscow Art Theatre and a People's Artist of the USSR, regarding one of the paintings. It was Vasily Surikov's The Apostle Paul explains the tenets of faith in the presence of King Agrippa, his sister Berenice, and the proconsul Festus (canvas, oil on canvas, 142 × 218.5 cm, now in the State Tretyakov Gallery, inv. Zh-48), for which Surikov received the title of Class Artist of the 1st degree in 1875.

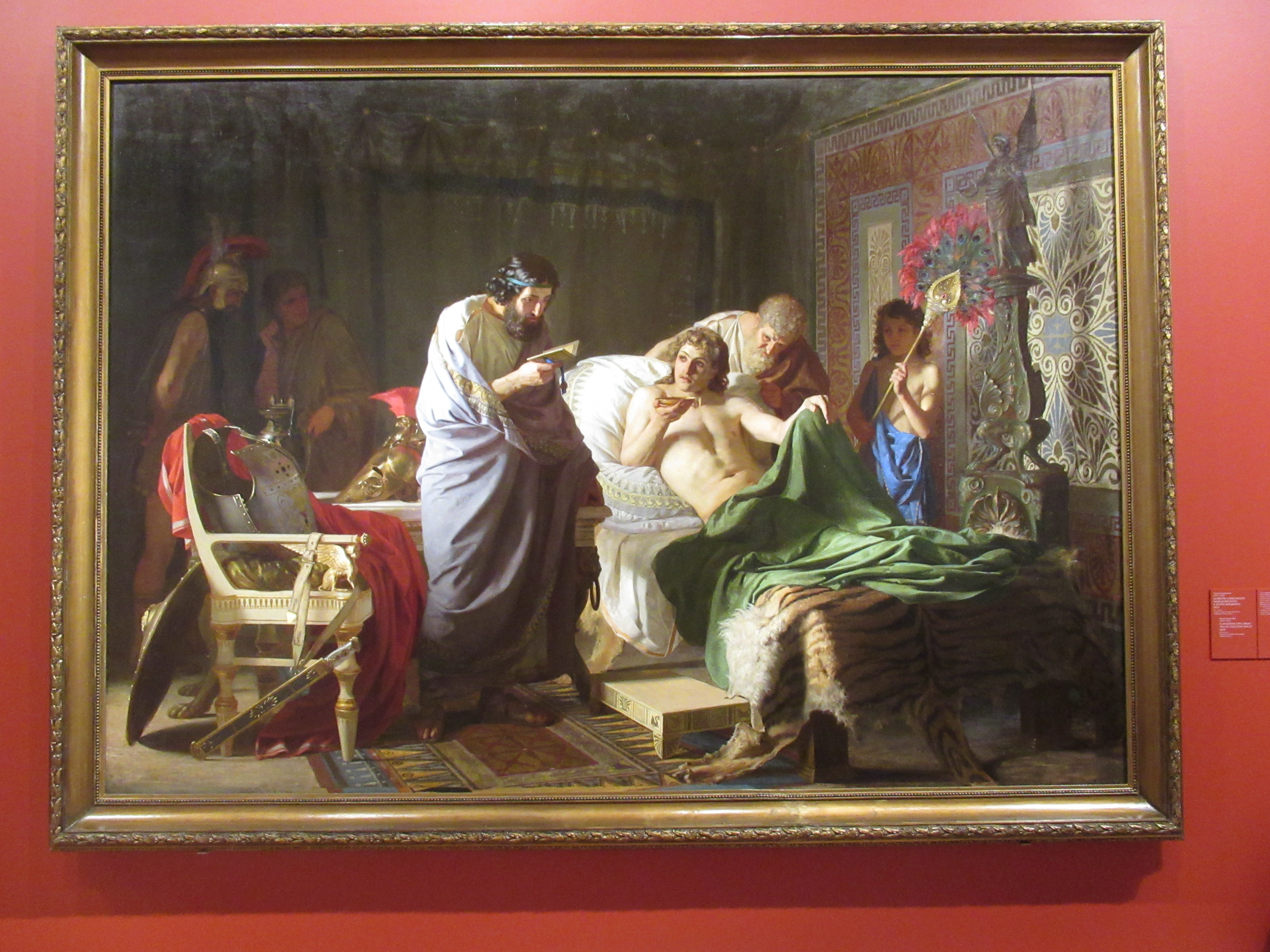
The painting Alexander the Great's trust in Doctor Philip at the 2022 exhibition at the State Tretyakov Gallery on Krymsky Val

The final price for Surikov's painting had to be approved by the Fund's acquisition commission, which met in the Tretyakov Gallery. Having seen Apostle Paul there, art historian Vladimir Kemenov (who was Deputy Minister of Culture of the USSR until 1956 and then Permanent Representative of the USSR to UNESCO) stated that this painting should remain in the Tretyakov Gallery, which had the most complete collection of Surikov's works. Instead, the Minsk museum was offered Siemiradzki's painting Alexander the Great's trust in Doctor Philip from the Tretyakov Gallery's funds, the format of which was even larger than Surikov's work. Elena Aladova was forced to accept what she considered to be an "unequal gift". In her memoirs, she wrote of Siemiradzki's work: "This painting took up the whole wall in our exhibition. It is, of course, spectacular, but Surikov's canvas was, of course, better". Siemiradzki's painting was removed from the inventory of the Tretyakov Gallery by order of the USSR Ministry of Culture No. 153 of 16 March 1956, transferred from the Gallery on 10 October 1957 (Act No. 133) and received by the State Art Museum of the BSSR on 13 October 1957 (Act No. 116, signed by Elena Resina, an employee of the museum). This happened shortly before the grand opening of the new museum building, which took place on 5 November 1957.

In 2004, the painting by Siemiradzki caught the attention of the crew of the film Alexander, directed by Oliver Stone, which recounts the life of Alexander the Great. The managers of the film company Warner Brothers sent a request to the National Art Museum of the Republic of Belarus (as the museum has been called since 1993) about the possibility of using the digital image of the painting Alexander the Great's trust in Doctor Philip in the pre-release advertising campaign of the film. The proposal for a deal was deemed too unusual and unexpected for the museum, and as a result, the contract was never signed.

In 2017, an in-depth article about the painting Alexander the Great's trust in Doctor Philip, written by art historian Nadezhda Usova, an employee of the National Art Museum of the Republic of Belarus, was published to coincide with the 60th anniversary of the painting's presence in the museum's collection. It put forth the argument that despite the numerous alterations that had occurred over the past six decades in the halls housing works of Russian art, Siemiradzki's painting remained one of the few that "did not change its location and never once left the walls of the museum for exhibitions". Five years after the article was published, this "tradition" was broken. From 28 April to 3 July 2022, the painting Alexander the Great's trust in Doctor Philip was exhibited at the New Tretyakov Gallery on Krymsky Val at the exhibition, titled Henryk Siemiradzki. The exhibition was timed to coincide with the 180th anniversary of the artist's birth. The canvas was transported to Moscow in advance for restoration work, during which, according to the exhibition curator Tatiana Karpova, "the painting was cleaned of impurities, the varnish was levelled, edges were corrected, toning was done; some stains, decomposition of varnish, all this was also corrected, and now it is in a shining form".

== Subject, characters and composition ==
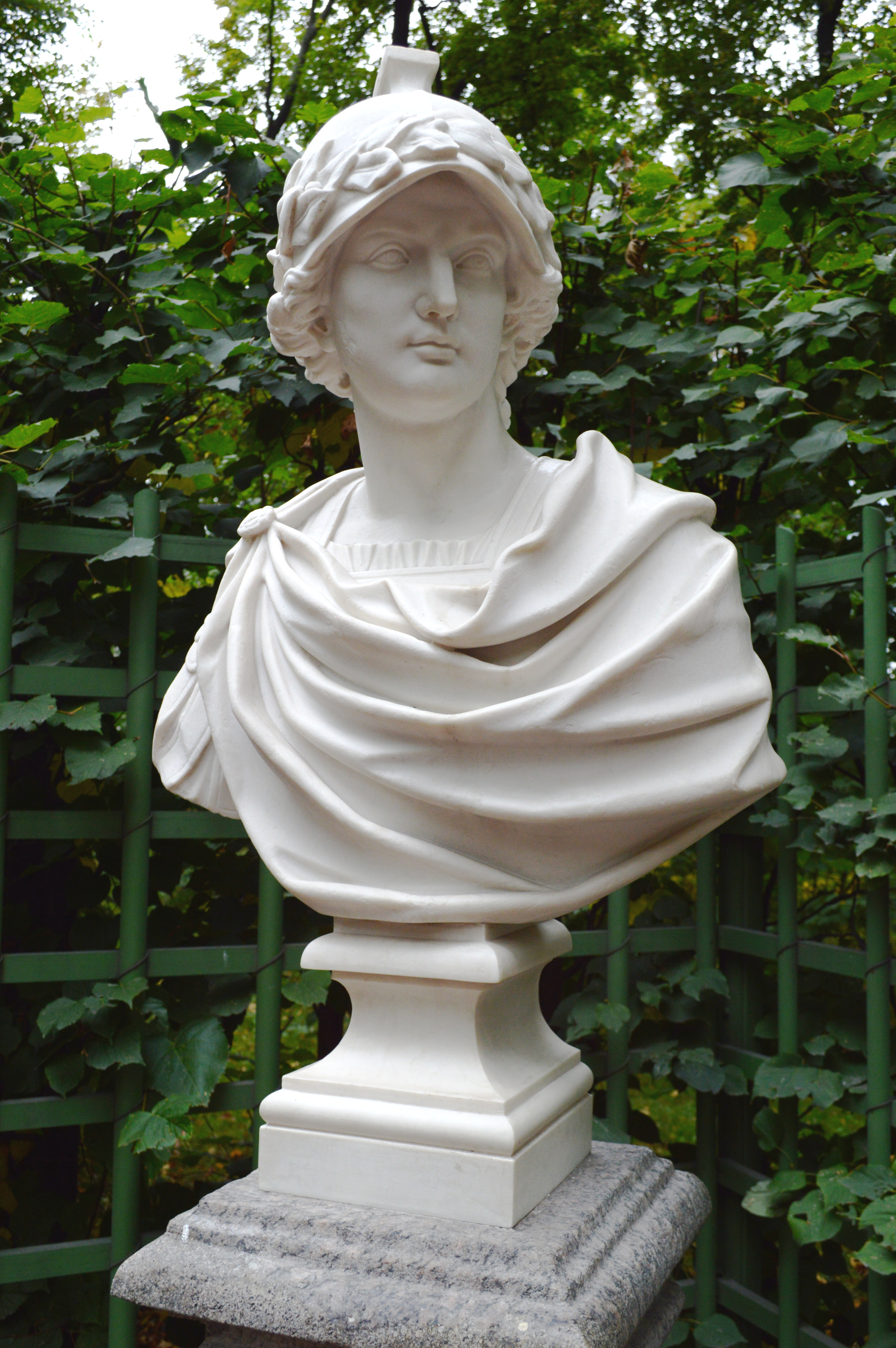
Bust of Alexander the Great in the Summer Garden

From the second half of the 17th century onward, subjects related to various episodes from the life of Alexander the Great became popular in Western European and then Russian art. One important source was the Histories of Alexander the Great, a biography written in the first century AD by the Roman historian Quintus Curtius Rufus, which was repeatedly published in Russian. In addition, a facsimile of the Old Russian novel Alexandria was published in 1861.

By 1870, a plethora of iconographic representations of Alexander the Great had emerged. In the context of European painting, he was typically depicted as a youthful, energetic warrior, clad in a helmet and a full suit of armour. To depict Alexander's face, Siemiradzki could have utilised a cast from a Roman copy of a statue of Alexander by Lysippos, held in the collection of the Academy of Arts, as well as an 18th-century marble bust located in the Summer Garden.

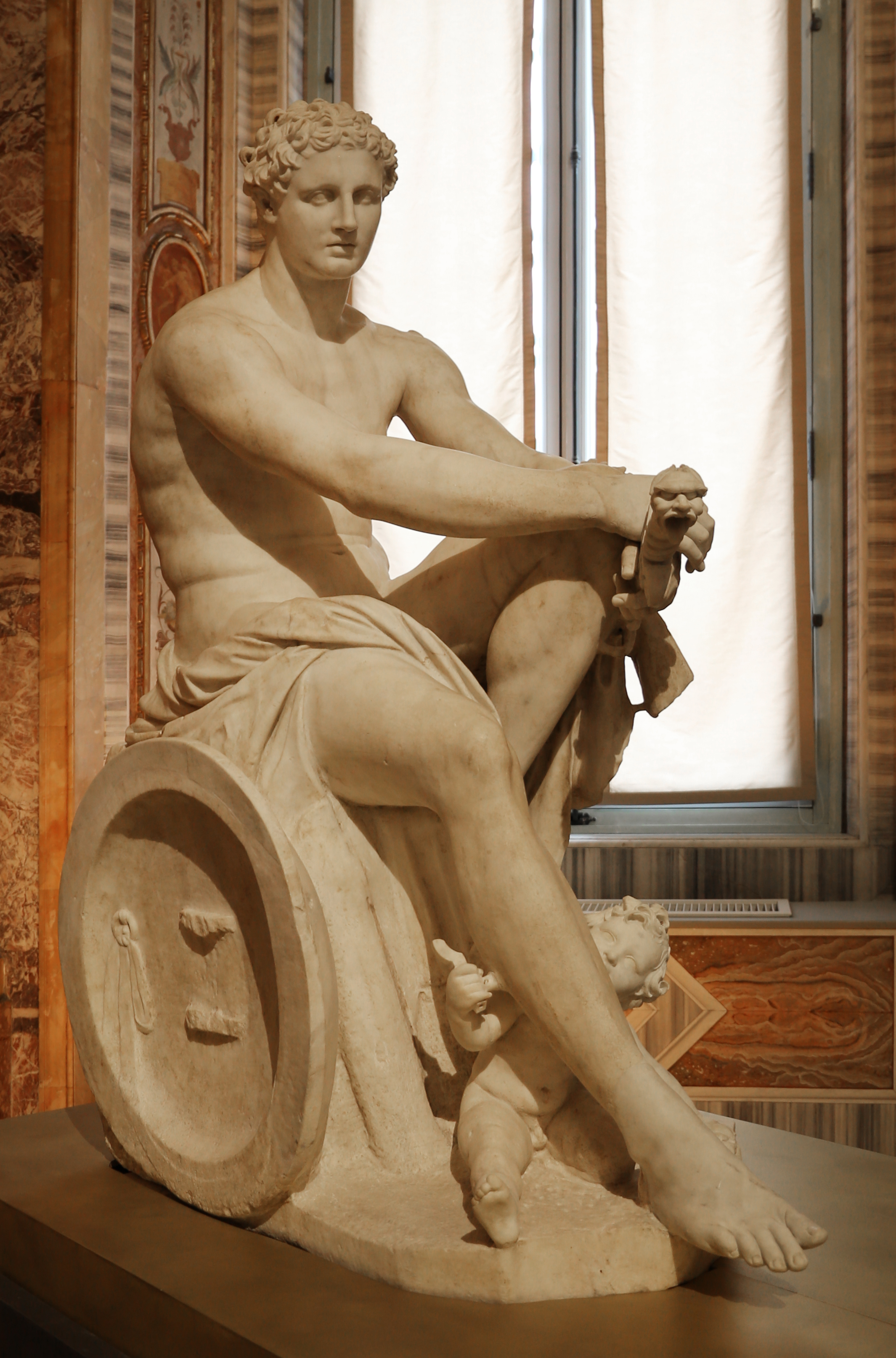
Ludovisi Ares, Palazzo Altemps collection

The episode depicted in Siemiradzki's painting is connected with the following legend. During his campaign against the Persian king Darius III, Alexander the Great contracted a cold and subsequently fell seriously ill. The physicians were reluctant to treat him, fearing that the Macedonians would massacre them if they failed to overcome the illness and Alexander died. According to Plutarch, only his physician Philip, "seeing the serious condition of the patient, put friendship above all else and considered it criminal not to share the danger with Alexander and not to exhaust - even at the risk to himself - all means". Philip prepared a strong medicine and brought it to the sick man. Shortly before, Alexander received an urgent message from his commander, Parmenion, informing him that his physician had been bribed by Darius and would administer poison instead of medicine. As Philip handed Alexander the bowl of potion, the king asked him to read the letter he had received. The subsequent events are illustrated on the canvas. Alexander, who places unquestioning trust in his physician, drinks the medicine he has brought without hesitation. Meanwhile, Philip reads the slanderous letter with surprise and indignation. As Plutarch noted, "it was a marvellous spectacle, worthy of contemplation".

In Siemiradzki's painting, the action takes place in a campaign tent. Alexander the Great, a handsome young man, naked from the waist down, "with a magnificent antique torso", is half seated on the bed. He is about to drink medicine from a cup in his right hand. The torso and the position of Alexander's right hand are somewhat similar to the famous 2nd century AD sculpture "Ares Ludovisi", a plaster copy of which was in the collection of the Academy of Arts. To Alexander's left is a full-length portrait of the physician Philip reading a letter given to him by the king. The doctor wears a white chiton embroidered with a yellow meander and fastened at the shoulders with fibulae, over which he wears a blue himation decorated with two types of ornaments. The sitter, Ivan, from whom Vasily Vereshchagin repeatedly painted his figures, posed for the figure of Philip. At the headboard of the bed, a grey-bearded old man is leaning toward Alexander. Some sources claim that the old man is Aristobulus of Cassandreia, who is trying to persuade the Tsar not to drink the medicine. The group comprising Alexander, Philip and the elder is the central element of the composition and is illuminated by light falling from the left side. In addition to them, there are two warriors at the back of the room to the left and a boy with an opahala to the right of the bed. It is known that the future sculptor Ilya Gintsburg served as the model for the boy with the ploughshare (a year later he also posed for Ilya Repin's competition painting The Resurrection of Jairus' Daughter).

Siemiradzki thoroughly studied the "world of things" of Alexander the Great's time, probably aided by visits to the Hermitage and the Public Library. On his canvas, he accurately depicted antique fabrics, garments, footwear, and armour worn by warriors, as well as ornaments on carpets, and a black-figure vase placed on a table. The exoticism of the Persian campaign is reflected in the oriental opal held by the boy and the tiger skin spread on the bed. At the right edge of the canvas is a statue, at the very top of which is a bronze sculpture of the goddess Nike with a laurel wreath. On the left edge is an antique chair on which royal armour is stacked. On the table is Alexander's helmet, the prototype of which may have been Minerva Giustiniani's helmet. Apparently, when painting it, Siemiradzki used a similar helmet from the academic collection created on the initiative of Alexey Olenin, president of the Academy of Arts from 1817 to 1843. In 1980, the helmet was transferred to the museum collection at the Priyutino estate.

The art historian Pyotr Gnedich noted the harmonious colouring of Siemiradzki's canvas, dominated by light violet and orange tones. According to the art historian Svetlana Ignatenko, in this work the artist demonstrated his own style, which was already well developed at the time, "expressed itself in an excellent knowledge of anatomy, soft, "fluid" silhouettes, light and shadow modelling, lighting effects and, in general, in impeccable technical skill".

Fragments of the painting Alexander the Great trusts Doctor Philip

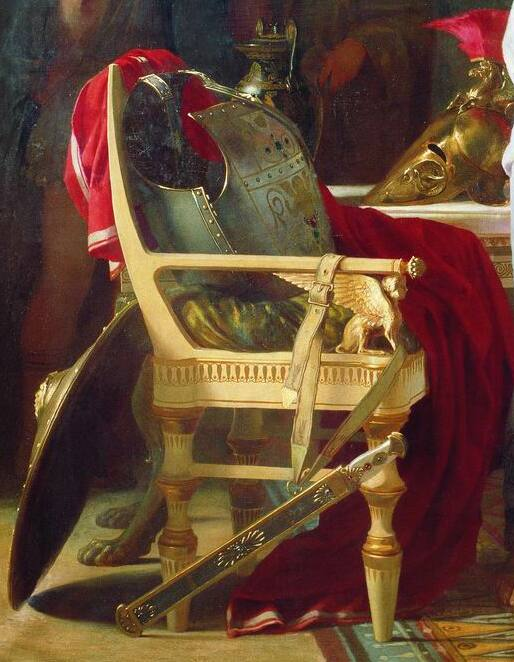
A chair with armour and a helmet

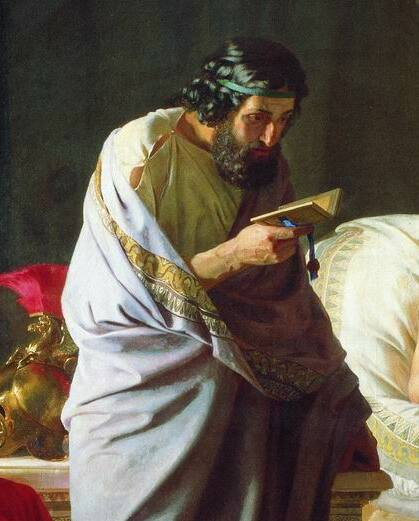
Doctor Philip

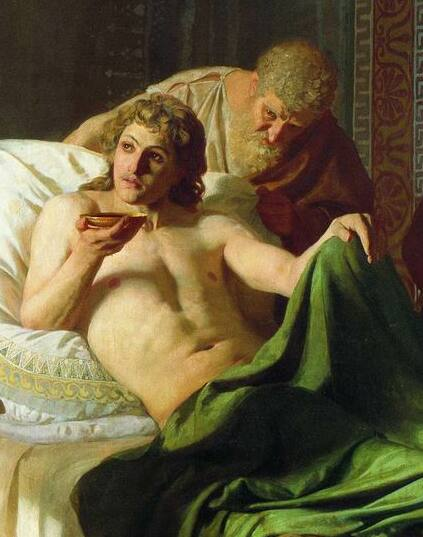
Alexander the Great and an elder

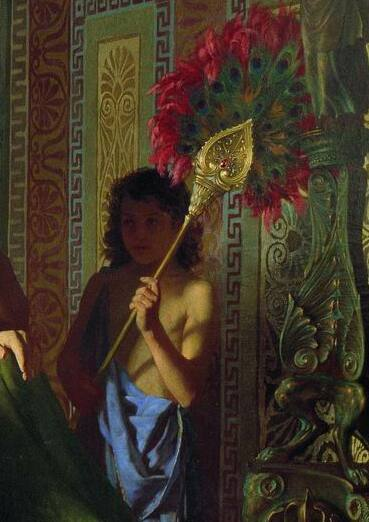
The boy with the fan

== Reviews and criticism ==
In an article about the 1870 academic exhibition, art critic Vladimir Stasov provided a comprehensive analysis of Siemiradzki's painting Alexander the Great's trust in Doctor Philip, which was exhibited there. In comparison to Siemiradzki's earlier graphic works, Stasov asserted that the painting demonstrated the artist's proficiency in utilizing color with a level of precision and nuance comparable to that of a black pencil, and had "a considerable ability for effect in colours". Acknowledging the low level of mental expressiveness, Stasov recognized "taste, strength, skill and extreme completeness in general", as well as the artist's conscientious study of the achievements of modern history and archaeology, in the painting. According to Stasov, if Siemiradzki showed "so much talent and strength" in working on a subject imposed on him from the outside, "what else should we expect from him when he is completely free and depends only on his own skill and talent?"

In an article published in November 1870 in the journal Vestnik Evropy, writer and critic Pavel Kovalevsky articulated a predominantly critical stance towards the competitive system employed by the Academy of Arts, which required multiple competitors to simultaneously create works on a given theme and reviewers to "review annually one plot given to a whole host of students". Nevertheless, among the works pertaining to the theme "Alexander the Great's trust in Doctor Philip", Kovalevsky singled out Siemiradzki's painting, pointing to it "as successful, seriously considered, well composed, very commendable in accessories and satisfactorily painted". Among the shortcomings of the painting, Kovalevsky identified the disproportionate size of Alexander's bent knee and the selection of a simplistic and unremarkable type for his head.

Art historian Pavel Klimov called Alexander the Great's trust in Doctor Philip "the earliest of Siemiradzki's significant works" and wrote that it was difficult to expect "a bright creative individuality" in this painting, which was essentially an examination task. Nevertheless, qualities such as "careful thoughtfulness of composition" and "great attention to the expressiveness of each detail", which were evident in this painting, became a characteristic feature of the artist's later work. According to Klimov, with this work, Siemiradzki "showed to himself and to others that he had fully mastered the technical tools and was ready to embark on an independent road".

Art historian Tatiana Karpova considered such distinctive features as "elegance of lines, clarity of silhouettes of figures, harmonious colouring" to be the merits of the canvas Alexander the Great's trust in Doctor Philip . According to Karpova, this work proved Siemiradzki to be "a talented student of the academic school, absorbing the precepts of classicism", which, in Russian painting, are associated with the names of Karl Bryullov, Fyodor Bruni and Alexander Ivanov.

== Bibliography ==
- Богдан, В.-И. Т. (2007). Исторический класс Академии художеств второй половины XIX века [Historical class of the Academy of Arts in the second half of the 19th century] (in Russian). Saint Petersburg: Научно-исследовательский музей Российской академии художеств. ISBN 978-5-901751-75-6.
- Gnedich, Pyotr (2002). История искусств. Живопись. Скульптура. Архитектура [Art History. Painting. Sculpture. Architecture] (in Russian). Moscow: Eksmo. ISBN 5-699-00307-X.
- Зорина, Е.Г. (2008). Семирадский [Siemiradzki] (in Russian). Moscow: Bely Gorod. ISBN 978-5-7793-1431-2.
- Игнатенко, С.В. (2021). "Старейший на Урале. Шедевры музейного собрания (Продолжение. Начало в №№ 5—12 (2020), №№ 1—3 (2021))" [The oldest in the Ural. Masterpieces of the museum collection (Continued. Beginning in Nos. 5-12 (2020), Nos. 1-3 (2021))]. Рампа. Культура Башкортостана (in Russian). 4 (330): 22–25.
- Карпова, Т.Л. (2008). Генрих Семирадский: Альбом [Henryk Siemiradzki: Album] (in Russian). Saint Petersburg: Золотой век. ISBN 978-5-342-00116-8.
- Климов, П.Ю. (2001). Генрих Семирадский [Henryk Siemiradzki] (in Russian). Moscow: Арт-Родник. ISBN 5-88896-050-0.
- Ковалевский, П.М. (1870). "Годичная выставка Академии художеств" [Annual exhibition of the Academy of Arts]. Vestnik Evropy (in Russian). 6 (11): 356–371.
- Кочемасова, Т.А. (2001). Генрих Семирадский [Henryk Siemiradzki] (in Russian). Moscow: Bely Gorod. ISBN 978-5-7793-0333-0.
- Кривдина, О.А. (2006). Ваятели и их судьбы: научная реконструкция творческих биографий российских скульпторов середины и второй половины XIX века [Sculptors and Their Fates: Scientific Reconstruction of Creative Biographies of Russian Sculptors of the Middle and Second Half of the 19th Century] (in Russian). Saint Petersburg: Сударыня. ISBN 5-88718-003-X.
- Лебедева, Д.Н. (2006). Генрих Семирадский [Henryk Siemiradzki] (in Russian). Moscow: Арт-Родник. ISBN 5-9561-0175-X.
- Петинова, Е.Ф. (2001). Русские художники XVIII — начала XX века [Russian artists of the 18th - early 20th century] (in Russian). Saint Petersburg: Aurora. ISBN 978-5-7300-0714-7.
- Салмина, Л.Н. (1971). "Генрих Ипполитович Семирадский" [Henryk Ippolitovich Siemiradzki]. Русское искусство: очерки о жизни и творчестве художников. Вторая половина XIX века, часть II (in Russian). А. И. Леонов. Moscow: Iskusstvo: 443–452.
- Stasov, Vladimir (1937). Избранные сочинения [Selected Works] (in Russian). Vol. 1. С. Н. Гольдштейн. Moscow: Iskusstvo.
- Усова, Н.М. (2017). "«Доверие Александра Македонского к врачу Филиппу» Генриха Семирадского в Национальном художественном музее Республики Беларусь: путь к триумфу. История создания и бытование картины" ["Alexander the Great trusts Doctor Philip" by Henryk Siemiradzki in the National Art Museum of the Republic of Belarus: the path to triumph. History of creation and existence of the painting]. Sztuka Europy Wschodniej (in Russian). 5: 93–102. doi:10.11588/diglit.45642.
- Файбисович, В.М. (2005). "Щит и меч русского академизма. Античное вооружение из костюмерной Императорской Академии художеств" [The Shield and Sword of Russian Academism. Antique armoury from the costume room of the Imperial Academy of Arts]. Наше наследие (in Russian). 5 (74): 48–57.
- Хасьянова, Л.С. (1998). "Генрих Семирадский, Илья Репин — два пути в искусстве" [Henryk Siemiradzki, Ilya Repin - two paths in art]. Литературная учёба (in Russian) (2): 177–212.
- "Выставка живописи и скульптуры (в залах Императорской академии художеств). Продолжение" [Exhibition of painting and sculpture (in the halls of the Imperial Academy of Arts). Continued]. Vsemirnaya Illyustratsiya (in Russian). 25 (16): 314–315. 1881.
- Государственная Третьяковская галерея — каталог собрания [State Tretyakov Gallery - catalogue of the collection] (in Russian). Vol. 4: Живопись второй половины XIX века, книга 2, Н–Я. Я. В. Брук, Л. И. Иовлева. Moscow: Красная площадь. 2006. ISBN 5-900743-22-5.
- Государственный Русский музей — каталог собрания [State Russian Museum - catalogue of the collection] (in Russian). Vol. 3: Живопись первой половины XIX века (К—Я). Г. Н. Голдовский. Saint Petersburg: Palace Editions. 2007. ISBN 978-5-93332-263-4.
- Государственный Русский музей — каталог собрания [State Russian Museum - catalogue of the collection] (in Russian). Vol. 5: Живопись второй половины XIX века (А—И). Г. Н. Голдовский, В. А. Леняшин. Saint Petersburg: Palace Editions. 2014. ISBN 978-5-93332-507-9.
- Елена Аладова. Музей — её судьба: воспоминания, документы, исследования [Elena Aladova. Museum - her destiny: memories, documents, research]. Беларусь мастацкая (in Russian). Б. А. Крепак. Мастацкая літаратура. 2006. ISBN 985-02-0884-8.
- "Живопись" [Painting]. Генрих Семирадский. По примеру богов [Henryk Siemiradzki. Following the example of the gods] (in Russian). Moscow: State Tretyakov Gallery. 2022. pp. 85–200. ISBN 978-5-89580-366-0.
- Иллюстрированный каталог Художественного отдела Всероссийской выставки в Москве, 1882 г. [Illustrated catalogue of the Art Department of the All-Russian Exhibition in Moscow, 1882.] (in Russian). Н. П. Собко. Saint Petersburg: Publisher Mikhail Botkin. 1882.
- Императорская Академия художеств. Музей. Русская живопись [The Imperial Academy of Arts. Museum. Russian painting] (in Russian). С. К. Исаков. Унион. 1915.
- "Письма Г. И. Семирадского родителям" [Letters of G. I. Siemiradzki to his parents]. Генрих Семирадский. По примеру богов [Henryk Siemiradzki. Following the example of the gods] (in Russian). Moscow: State Tretyakov Gallery. 2022. pp. 268–318.
- Русская дореволюционная и советская живопись в собрании Национального художественного музея Республики Беларусь. Каталог [Russian pre-revolutionary and Soviet painting in the collection of the National Art Museum of the Republic of Belarus. Catalogue] (in Russian). Vol. 2 (К—Я). Р. Г. Бадин, Т. И. Карандашева, Т. А. Резник, Е. К. Ресина. Belarus. 1997. ISBN 985-01-0147-4.
- Сборник материалов для истории Императорской С.-Петербургской академии художеств за сто лет её существования [Collection of materials for the history of the Imperial St. Petersburg Academy of Arts for one hundred years of its existence] (in Russian). Vol. II (1811—1843). П. Н. Петров. Saint Petersburg: Типография Гогенфельдена и Ко. 1865.
- Chasjanowa, L. (2017). "Siemiradzki z całego serca kochał nature-morte..." Sztuka Europy Wschodniej (in Polish). 5: 77–92. doi:10.11588/diglit.45642.
