= Christ and Sinner =

Painting by Polish painter Henryk Siemiradzki

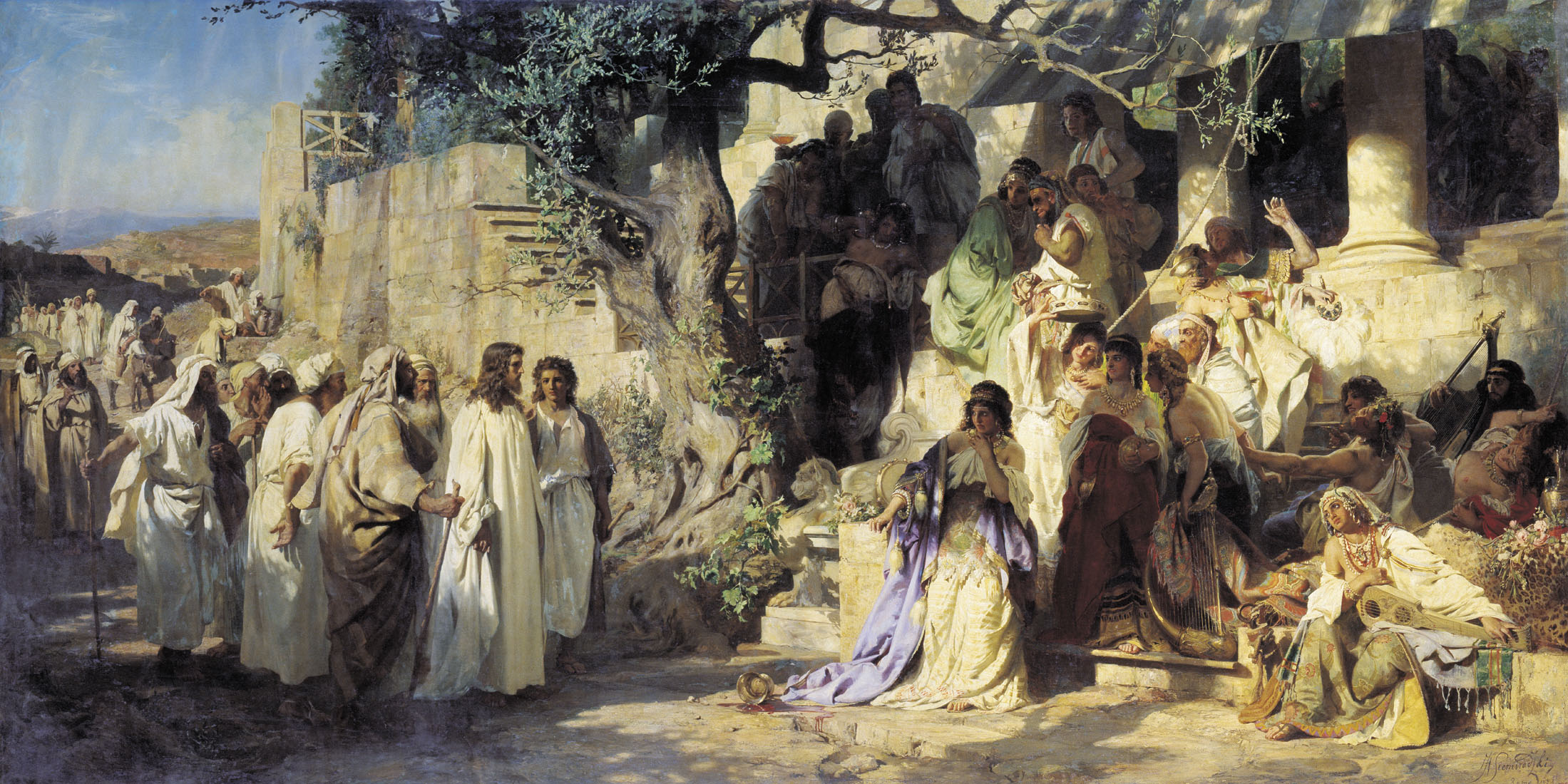
- Artist: Henryk Siemiradzki
- Year: 1873
- Medium: Oil on canvas
- Dimensions: 250 cm × 499 cm (98 in × 196 in)
- Location: State Russian Museum, Saint Petersburg

Christ and Sinner is a large-format painting by the Polish and Russian painter-academist Henryk Siemiradzki (1843–1902). It was completed in 1873 and is currently held in the State Russian Museum in St. Petersburg (Inventory Zh-5674). The dimensions of the painting are 250 × 499 cm.

The subject of the painting is related to the story of Christ and the woman taken in adultery described in the Gospel of John. Siemiradzki's interpretation of the theme is analogous to the motifs of Aleksey Konstantinovich Tolstoy's poem The Sinner, which was popular at the time. The composition of the painting can be divided into two sections. On the left is a scene of Christ with his followers, while on the right is a scene of a smartly dressed sinner with an entourage of entertaining men and women.

The painting was commissioned by grand prince Vladimir Alexandrovich and created by Siemiradzki in Rome. In March 1873, the painting was transported to St Petersburg, where it was exhibited at the Academic Exhibition. Siemiradzki was awarded the title of Academician by the Academy of Arts for creating the painting. It was subsequently purchased by the heir to the throne, Alexander Alexandrovich, for 10,000 roubles. In 1873, the painting was exhibited at the World's Fair in Vienna, where Siemiradzki was awarded the medal "For Art", marking his first international award.

Painter Ivan Kramskoi wrote that Siemiradzki's painting "makes a stunning impression". However, "Christ with the apostles is somewhat paltry". Critic Vladimir Stasov noted the "brilliant colouring" of the painting, yet wrote that it was "superficial in content" and criticized the images of the sinner, Christ, and the apostles. Art historian Tatiana Karpova observed that in the Christ and Sinner, Siemiradzki pioneered the use of plein air techniques "in a large canvas painted on a subject from the distant past" and that at that time "it was a novelty for Russian art".

== History ==
=== Background and creation ===
In 1870, Henryk Siemiadzki graduated from the St Petersburg Academy of Arts and was awarded the title of class artist of the first degree and a big gold medal for his painting Alexander the Great's trust in Doctor Philip, which was entered in the competition. Together with the medal, the artist received the right to a six-year pensioner's trip abroad at the expense of the Academy of Arts. Siemiradzki commenced his journey as a pensioner in August 1871. After visiting Krakow, he arrived in Munich in September of the same year. He spent several months in the city, during which time he painted Roman Orgy in the Time of Caesars. This work received favourable reviews from critics in Munich and St Petersburg, where it was sent for another academic exhibition.

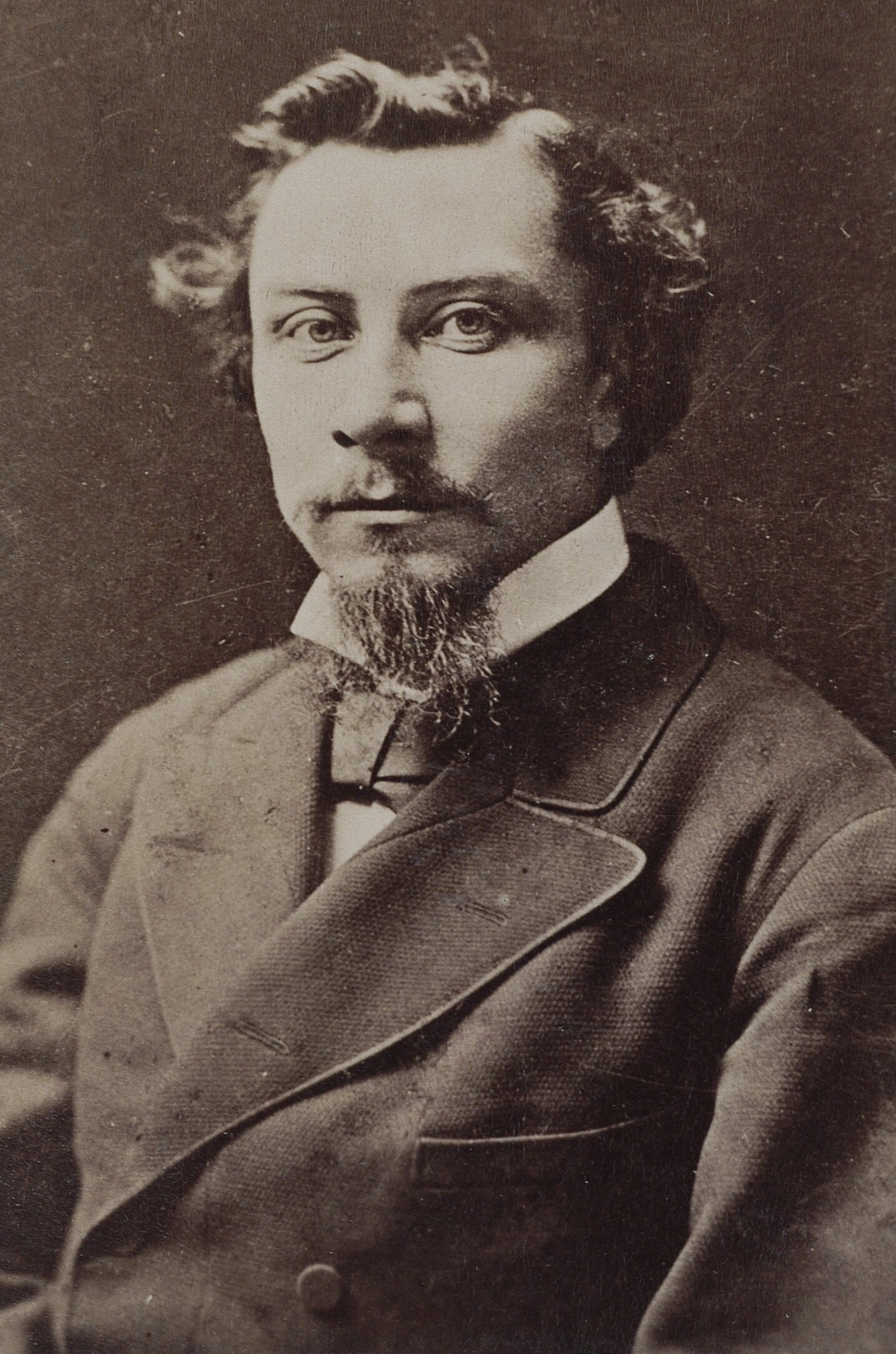
Henryk Siemiradzki (photograph, circa 1875)

In April 1872, Siemiradzki departed from Munich for Florence to stay there long-term. However, having travelled through Italy shortly after, the artist changed his plans and decided to move to Rome. He informed the Academy of Arts of this decision in a letter dated 9 May 1872. Siemiradzki promptly leased a studio on Via Margutta, where he commenced work on a new painting, which he called Christ and Sinner or The Sinner.

The commissioner for this painting was Grand Duke Vladimir Alexandrovich, who was a fellow (deputy) president of the Academy of Arts from 1869 and became its president in 1876. The Grand Duke proposed a theme for the future painting to Siemiradzki while he was still in St Petersburg. In particular, Vladimir Alexandrovich sent the artist a copy of Aleksey Konstantinovich Tolstoy's poem The Sinner, first published in 1858 in the magazine Russkaya Beseda. This poem was very popular at the time and was part of the repertoire of various literary evenings.

In the autumn of 1872, the artist Vasily Polenov arrived in Rome, where he commenced work on a painting with a similar subject, Christ and the Woman taken in Adultery (alternatively titled: He That Is Without Sin) In a letter to his family dated 15 October 1872, Polenov wrote: "Here already lives an Academy fellow Pole Siemiradzki. Very kind and charming gentleman and an interesting artist". In the same missive, Polenov stated that he had formed close relationships with other Polish artists in Rome and that he "began to make studies for the painting He That Is Without Sin". In a letter dated 31 March 1873 Vera Nikolaevna Voeikov, Polenov's grandmother, informed her grandson from St Petersburg: "We had your friend Siemiradzki, who liked you very much and praised your talent and your sketches in Rome, as well as the painting you started." Polenov worked much longer on the canvas Christ and the Woman Taken in Adultery (He That Is Without Sin) than Siemiradzki on his Sinner, only finishing it in 1887.

Siemiradzki dedicated at least a year and a half to contemplating the subject, including the creation of sketches and studies. According to his recollections, he spent approximately eight months working on the large canvas. In the process of creating The Sinner, Siemiradzki employed the latest achievements of photography, with images taken at his request by professional photographer Michele Mang. The collection of the National Museum in Kraków contains photographic documentation of sitters and mannequins in their respective poses and attire, which were employed to create the various characters depicted in the painting, including the protagonists, Jesus Christ and the Sinner. The painting was completed in February 1873, thus the entire process of creating The Sinner spanned approximately three years, from 1870 to 1873.

=== Exhibitions of 1873 and sale of the painting ===
In the spring of 1873, the Academic Exhibition was held in St Petersburg, where works of painting and sculpture were exhibited to be sent to the World's Fair in Vienna. Some artists were unable to deliver their works by the time the exhibition commenced. Ivan Aivazovsky, who was working in Florence at the time, requested a postponement for the artists who were in Italy. He specifically mentioned that Siemiradzki was engaged in a notable painting, which he could not complete until the end of January. It was not until 10 March that Siemiradzki informed the academy leadership that the painting Christ and Sinner had been sent to St Petersburg. He also requested that the painting be unpacked in his presence.

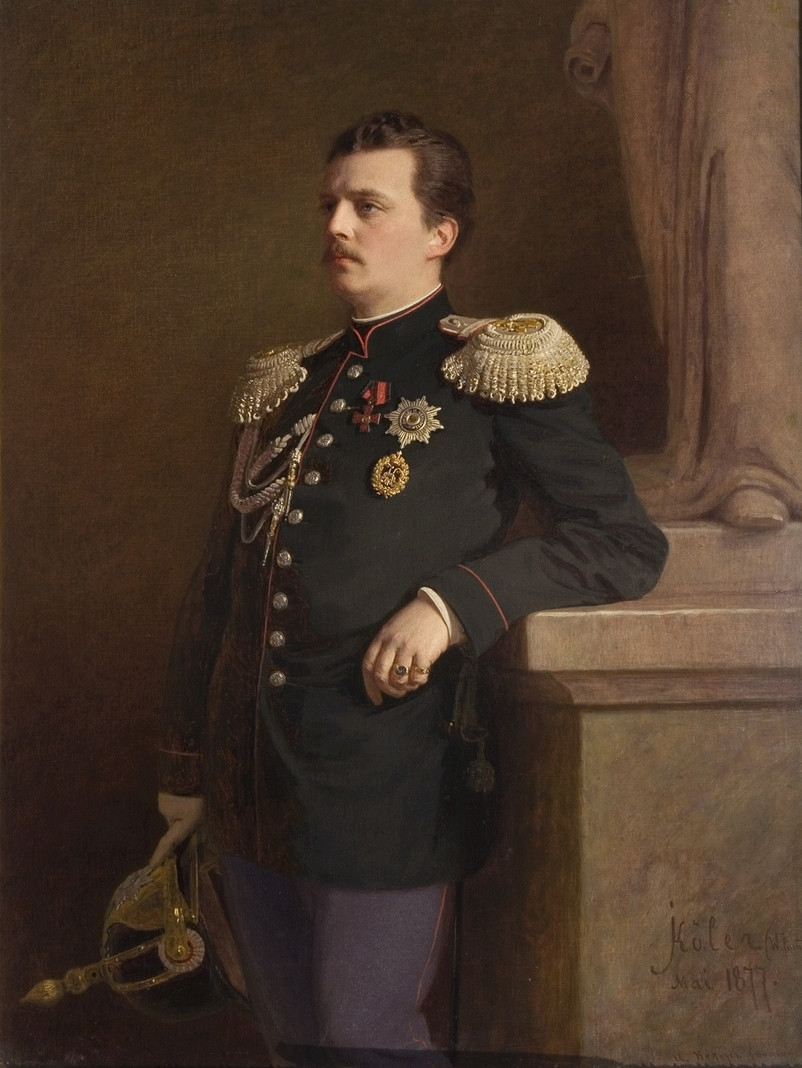
Johann Köler. Portrait of Grand Duke Vladimir Alexandrovich (circa 1878)

Siemiradzki arrived in St. Petersburg at the end of March. His new painting was presented in the Raphael Hall of the Academy of Arts on March 30. Even though the exhibition was only two days from closing, the painting managed to attract attention and make a great impression on viewers. In a letter dated 2 April, Siemiradzki wrote to his family: "For two days my painting has been exhibited in the halls of the Academy, the public, attracted by the announcement, which placed the Academy in the newspapers on the arrival of my painting, again crowded at the exhibition. I am now the object of enthusiasm and envy in the artistic world; it never occurred to me that I could have made such an impression with my painting. The common opinion is that my 'Sinner' has, by its appearance, shattered the whole exhibition of works intended for Vienna, as the local artists say in Russian, 'smashed it into splinters'".

Of the numerous paintings exhibited at the event, three, in particular, attracted considerable attention: Barge Haulers on the Volga by Ilya Repin, Jesters at the Court of Empress Anna by Valery Jacobi and Crist and Sinner. In a letter to Kozma Soldatyonkov, artist Pavel Chistyakov noted that with his new work "Siemiradzki stunned, and not the public, but the artists", adding that "all this pleases our brother". Painter Ivan Kramskoi wrote that Siemiradzki's painting "makes an overwhelming impression, for a long time you cannot control your mind", although, according to him, "Christ with the apostles is somewhat paltry". Critic Vladimir Stasov, writing under the pseudonym "O.", published an article titled Siemiradzki's New Painting 'Sinner' in the Sankt-Peterburgskie Vedomosti (No. 95 for 1873). Stasov noted that the painting "created such a sensation that will not even be remembered", and that since Bryullov's The Last Day of Pompeii, nothing so magnificent had appeared in Russian painting. However, Stasov himself did not like the sinner ("insignificant and boring in her pose, face, expression"), nor Christ ("a pale, sluggish figure in a white chiton"), nor the apostles ("Arabian robe-makers with the most ordinary faces and expressionless physiognomies").

Despite the criticism, both the commissioner, Grand Duke Vladimir Alexandrovich, and the conference secretary of the Academy of Arts, Pyotr Iseyev, expressed a high level of appreciation for the painting Christ and Sinner. As a result, Siemiradzki was awarded the title of academician, which ultimately led to his reputation as "one of the leading masters of Russian academism" being secured. At the recommendation of Grand Duke Vladimir Alexandrovich, the painting Christ and Sinner was purchased by the heir to the throne, Alexander Alexandrovich, for a considerable sum, equivalent to approximately 10,000 roubles at the time. Furthermore, Vladimir Alexandrovich requested that Siemiradzki create a second version of the painting in sepia for his collection.

In the same year, 1873, the painting Christ and Sinner was sent to the World's Fair in Vienna. The painting was exhibited alongside other works that exemplified the achievements of Russian painting in the preceding decade. These included Peter and Alexei by Nikolai Ge, The Hunters at Rest and Fisherman by Vasily Perov, Barge Haulers on the Volga by Ilya Repin, an author's copy of the canvas The Rooks Have Returned by Alexei Savrasov, and others. The painting Christ and Sinner was exhibited in the central hall of the Art Pavilion. Friedrich Pecht, a German artist and art historian, observed that Siemiradzki's canvas was painted with great skill. He described it as a "very talented and piquant study of the influence of the effects of sunlight on architecture and people," although, in his words, "it is somewhat difficult to understand why Christ should serve as a model for such experiments." In a guide to the art section of the Vienna exhibition, journalist Ernst Lehmann wrote that Siemiradzki, "still a young Russian artist, presented in his 'Sinner' a work that shows us a great colourist; moreover, his way of treating biblical material is in every respect new and perhaps the only one suitable in our time for religious paintings". However, translating these reviews from German, Siemiradzki's opponent Vladimir Stasov wryly remarked that in both Vienna and Russia, Christ and Sinner was "very much liked by people with less sense and almost not at all liked by those who are more artistically advanced and whose taste is more educated". In any case, Christ and Sinner was awarded the medal "For Art" at the Vienna exhibition. It was the first international award received by Siemiradzki.

=== Subsequent events ===
In 1874, on its way from Vienna to St Petersburg, The Sinner was displayed for several days at an exhibition in Warsaw, all the proceeds of which Siemiradzki donated to Polish artists in need. The canvas, entitled Christ and Sinner, was also included in the exposition of the All-Russian Industrial and Art Exhibition of 1882, held in Moscow. In addition to the aforementioned painting, the exhibition also included four other works by Siemiradzki: Alexander the Great's Trust in Doctor Philip (1870), Dance among Swords (1881), Orgy in the reign of Tiberius on the island of Capri (1881) and Nero's Torches (1882, a smaller version of the large canvas of 1876).

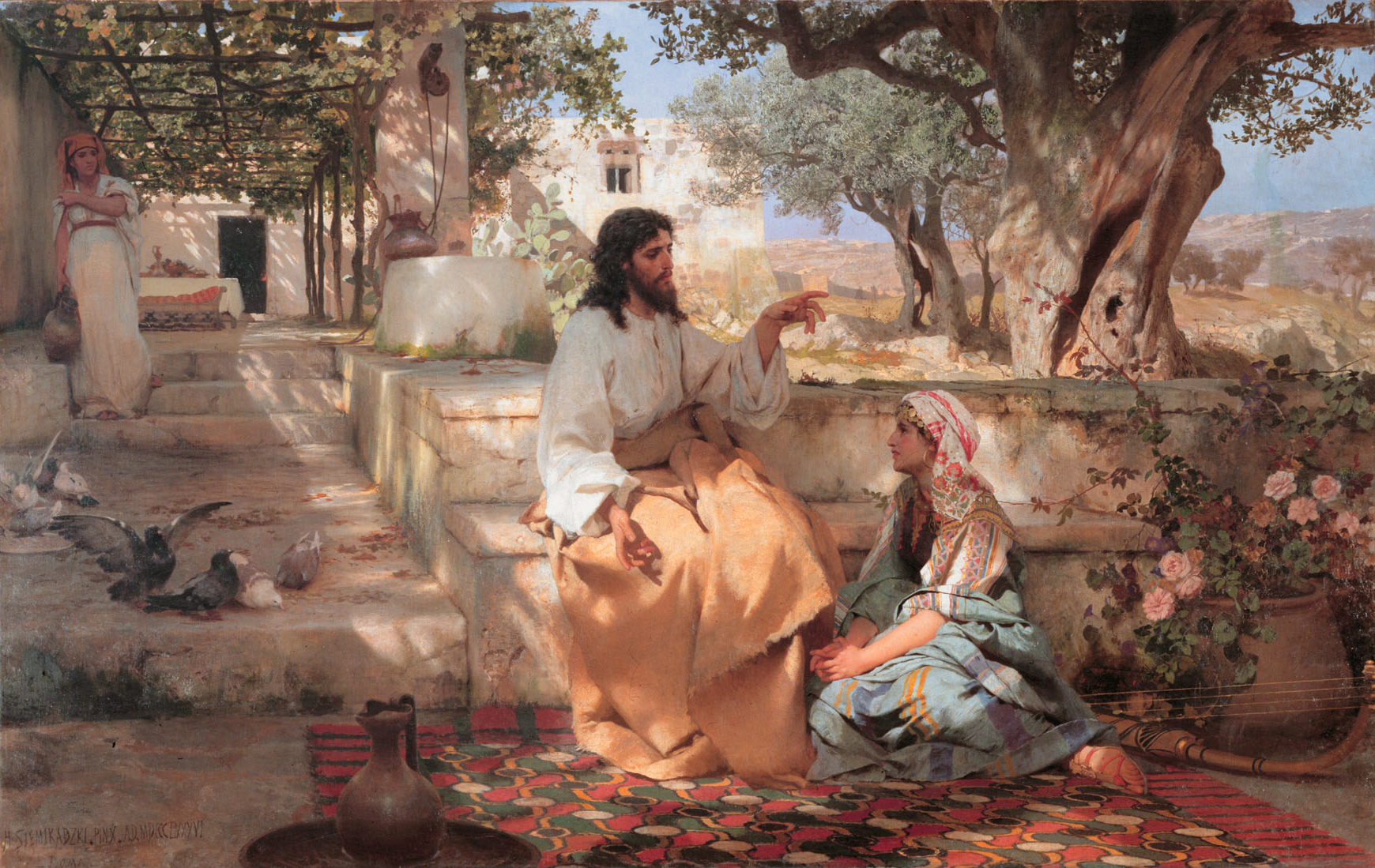
Henryk Siemiradzki. Christ with Martha and Maria (1886, State Russian Museum)

Christ and Sinner was the start of a small evangelical cycle by Henryk Siemiradzki, followed by works such as Christ with Martha and Maria (1886, State Russian Museum), Christ and Samaritan (1890, Lviv National Art Gallery) and Christ among Children (1900-1901, National Museum in Warsaw).

The painting Christ and Sinner was initially housed in the Tsarskoye Selo Alexander Palace. In 1897, it was transferred to the Russian Museum of Emperor Alexander III (now the State Russian Museum), where it remains to this day. In the early years of the museum's existence, Christ and Sinner was exhibited in the same room as Ilya Repin's Reply of the Zaporozhian Cossacks, Vasily Surikov's The Conquest of Siberia by Yermak Timofeyevich, Konstantin Savitsky's To the War and a painting on a similar theme Christ and the Woman Taken in Adultery by Vasily Polenov. Besides Siemiradzki's Christ and Sinner, there were other paintings by Academic artists - Orgy by Wilhelm Kotarbinski and Kissing Custom by Konstantin Makovsky.

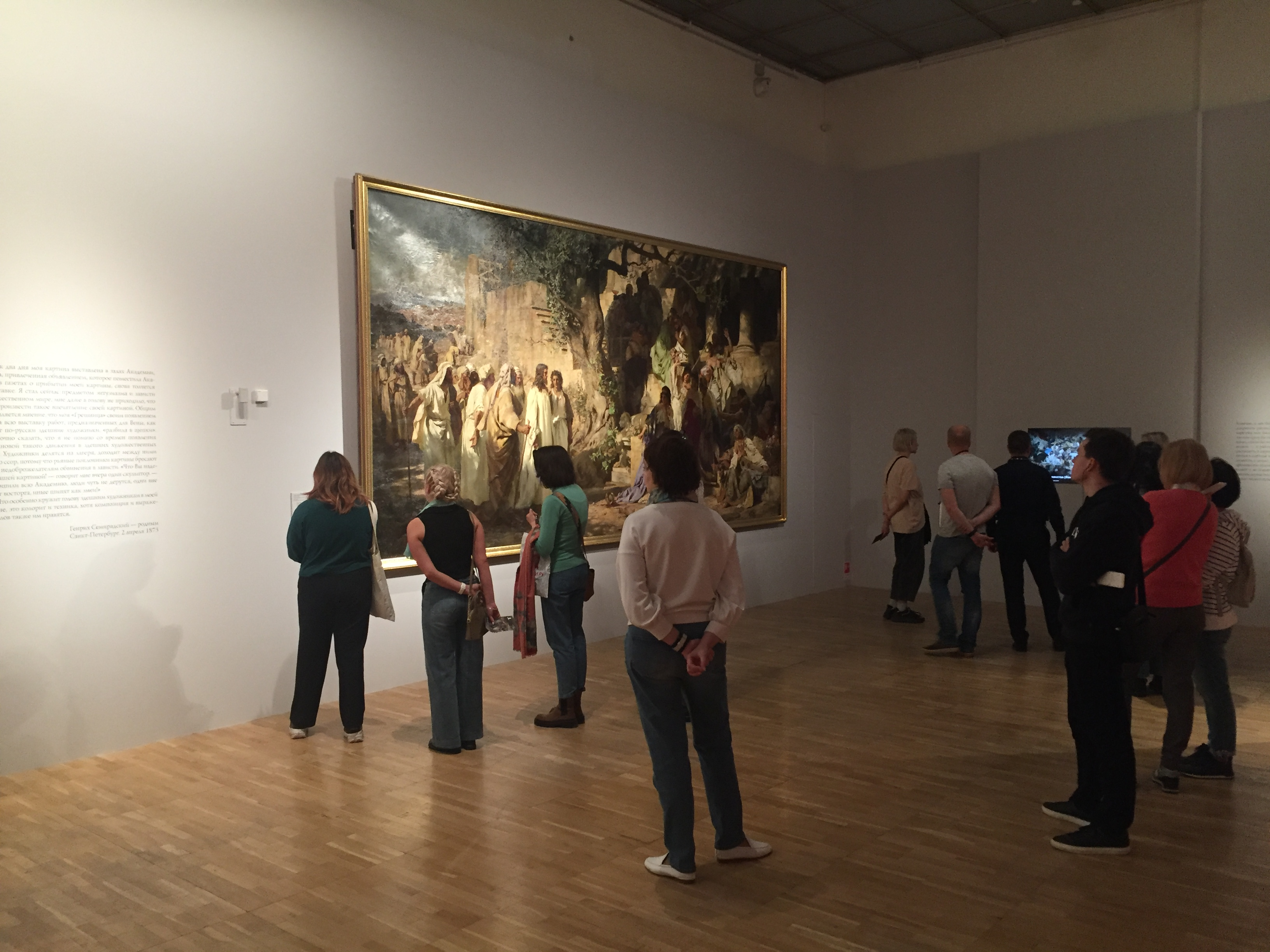
The painting Christ and Sinner at the 2022 exhibition at the State Tretyakov Gallery on Krymsky Val

In 2014, the artist-restorers of the State Russian Museum, Irina Kornyakova and Natalia Romanova, conducted research and restoration of the painting Christ and Sinner. An analysis of the condition of the canvas revealed that the painting had already been transferred to a new canvas (possibly in the late 19th century). However, no records of this operation were found in the archives. The principal issues were attributable to the damage incurred during the transfer from the author's canvas and the extended period of storage on the roll. This resulted in significant deformation of the surface and the lagging of the paint layer with the ground from the canvas. In some instances, there were even areas of delamination of the painting, accompanied by the loss of the paint layer. During the restoration process in 2014, the previous transfer canvas was removed from the painting, and the paint layer was strengthened and levelled. Subsequently, the painting was re-translated onto a new linen canvas base, and finally, the restored canvas was stretched onto a new stretcher. The method developed for the restoration of such a large painting is unique.

The painting Christ and Sinner was exhibited at the exhibition Henry Siemiradzki and the Colony of Russian Artists in Rome, held from 20 December 2017 to 2 April 2018 in the Benois Building of the State Russian Museum in St. Petersburg to mark Siemiradzki's 175th anniversary. It was also one of the exhibits in the exhibition Henryk Siemiradzki. By the Example of the Gods, which was held from April 28 to July 3, 2022, at the New Tretyakov Gallery on Krymsky Val.

== Subject and composition ==
The narrative of the painting is based on the story of Jesus and the woman taken in adultery as described in the Gospel of John (the three synoptic Gospels do not contain this story). Siemiradzki's interpretation of the story differs significantly from the traditional Gospel version, in which a woman caught in adultery was forcibly brought to Christ by Pharisees and Sadducees. According to the laws of Moses, the sinner was to be stoned.

In contrast to the Gospel, Siemiradzki's treatment of the theme is similar in its description to the motifs of Aleksey Konstantinovich Tolstoy's then popular poem The Sinner. In this poem, a fallen woman who has been enjoying herself in the noisy company of idle people is transformed under the influence of Christ. Apparently, this version, which symbolises the moral victory of Christianity over paganism, was suggested to the artist by the canvas's customer, Grand Duke Vladimir Alexandrovich. Nevertheless, although Siemiradzki found both the subject and the melody of Tolstoy's poems appealing, he did not regard his work as a mere illustration of the poetic lines. Without intending to collect material in Palestine, the artist believed that his own imagination would assist him, as well as the bright light of the Italian sun, which would "saturate the space, pick out some figures from it and cover others".

The French philosopher and writer Ernest Renan's book Life of Jesus, which emphasised Christ's humanity and, in particular, discussed his relationship with women, may also have had some influence on the interpretation of the plot of The Sinner. The author of the book posits that Christ's respect for women, including those who had fallen, contravened the prevailing norms of the era. In Renan's view, Jesus' conduct reflected his innate nobility, and his genuine kindness contributed to the successful rebirth of sinners.

Fragments of the painting Christ and Sinner

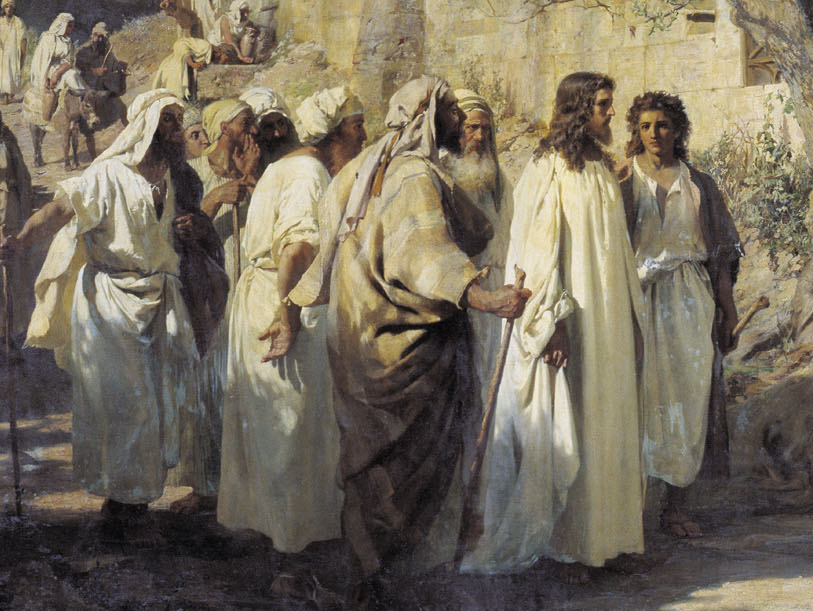
Christ and his followers

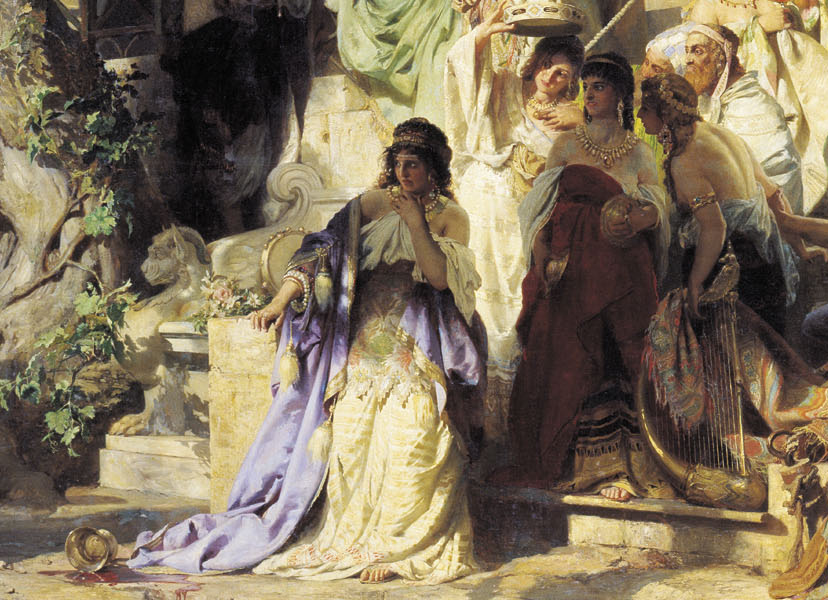
The sinner and the people around her

In terms of composition, the painting Christ and Sinner can be divided into two sections. The left side of the canvas depicts Christ and his followers, all dressed in modest light-coloured clothes. In contrast, the right side of the canvas portrays a sinful courtesan in a smart silk garment with a lot of jewellery; behind her is a retinue of merry and tipsy men and women. The composition is characterised by the positioning of the figures of Christ and the sinner at approximately equal distances from the left and right edges of the canvas. The artist has captured the moment when they stare at each other - "the moment of the confrontation of gazes".

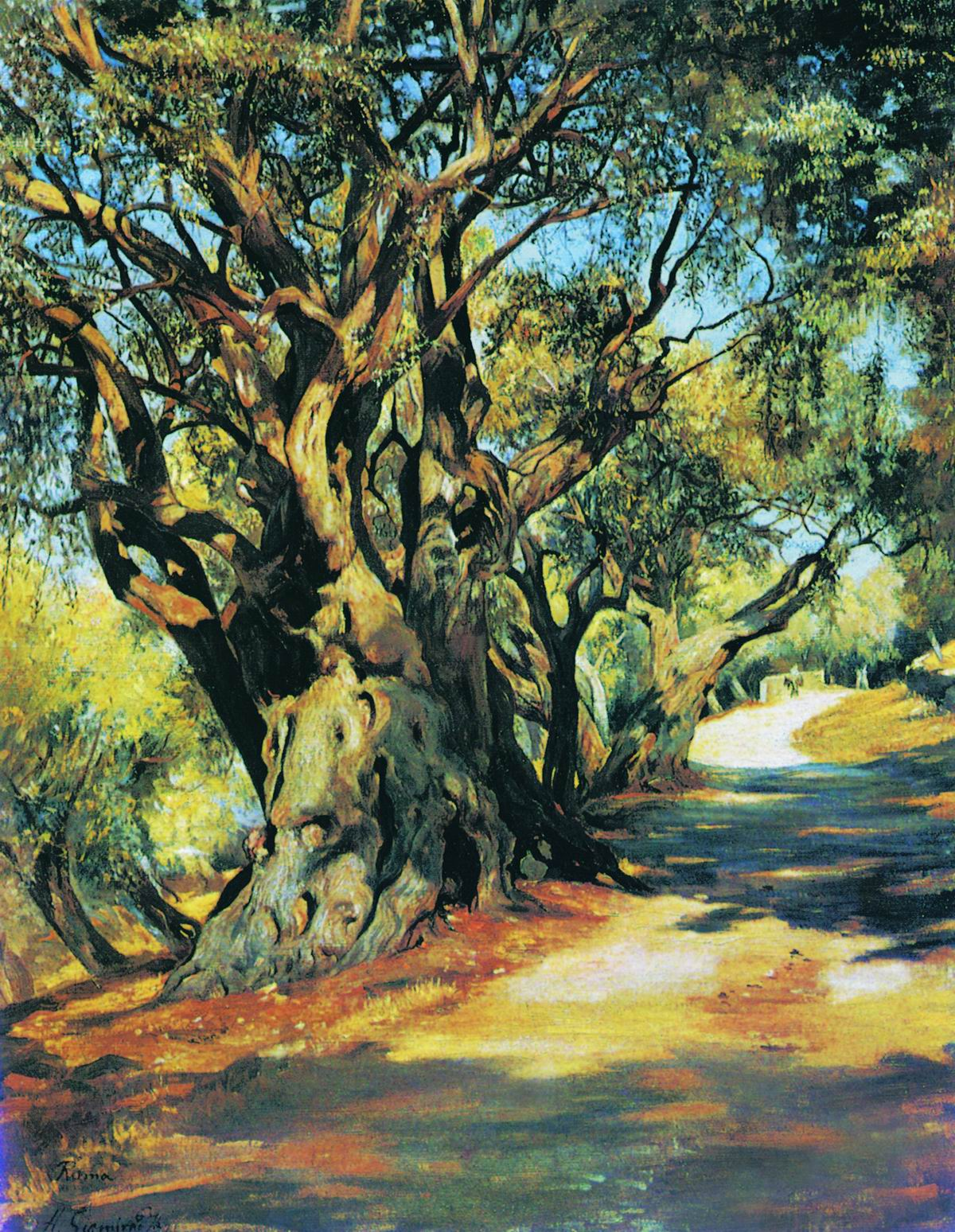
Road from Rome to Albano (1870s, Tver Regional Art Gallery)

The canvas's central composition features an aged olive tree situated between the left and right groups of characters. It is likely that the tree was the subject of Siemiradzki's attention during the period in which he created the landscape Road from Rome to Albano (canvas, oil, 78 × 62 cm, 1870s, Tver Regional Art Gallery). The tree, in conjunction with the border delineated by its shadow, assumes a prominent V-shaped configuration within the composition of the canvas. In the shadow of the tree, several people are having fun, with a partially nude woman standing out. At the base of the tree, a sculpture of a winged "monster" with the body of a lion, the face of a cat and the horns of a goat is situated.

Dressed in a long white chiton, Christ is depicted as merciful and forgiving, his image symbolising beauty, harmony and perfection, in the words of Tolstoy: "With love for his neighbours, / He taught humility to the people, / He made all the laws of Moses / Obey by the law of love; / He does not tolerate anger, nor vengeance, / He preaches forgiveness, / He says to repay evil with kindness..." (Russian: «Любовью к ближним пламенея, / Народ смиренью он учил, / Он все законы Моисея / Любви закону подчинил; / Не терпит гнева он, ни мщенья, / Он проповедует прощенье, / Велит за зло платить добром…»). To the right of Christ, between him and the old olive tree, is the Apostle John. He is turned towards the viewer and the grey of his cloak blends well with the colours of the shaded parts of the tree trunk. The clothing of Christ and his followers combines elements of both ancient and Arabic styles.

In the poem The Sinner, Aleksey Tolstoy described the "young harlot" as follows: "Her fanciful attire / Involuntarily attracts the eye, / Her immodest garments / Speak of a sinful life; / But the fallen maiden is beautiful..." (Russian: «Её причудливый наряд / Невольно привлекает взоры, / Её нескромные уборы / О грешной жизни говорят; / Но дева падшая прекрасна…»). In accordance with Tolstoy's description, Siemiradzki portrays the heroine of his painting as a paragon of beauty and dressiness, as exemplified in the poem: "Her earrings and wrists, / Tinkling, to the raptures of voluptuousness, / Call to the fiery pleasures, / Diamonds glitter here and there, / And, casting a shadow on the lanits, / In all the abundance of beauty, / Twisted with a pearl thread, / Luxurious hair will fall..." (Russian: «Её и серьги и запястья, / Звеня, к восторгам сладострастья, / К утехам пламенным зовут, / Алмазы блещут там и тут, / И, тень бросая на ланиты, / Во всем обилии красы, / Жемчужной нитью перевиты, / Падут роскошные власы…»). Under Christ's gaze, the sinner feels a sense of shame that she had long forgotten, and drops the goblet of wine, which falls to the ground in front of her. Behind the protagonist is another woman, also gazing at Christ. Compositionally, this woman and the entertainers around her balance the group of Christ and his followers on the left.

== Sketches, studies and repetitions ==
A significant proportion of Henryk Siemiradzki's graphic legacy is held in Polish museums. The National Museum in Kraków houses the artist's sketchbook, which includes 32 sketches for the painting Christ and Sinner, along with other preparatory materials (the following inventory numbers are referenced: MNK III-r.a. 18401, 18402 and 17323). In particular, the Kraków Museum has a sketch variant of the painting Christ and Sinner (paper on cardboard, graphite pencil). The National Museum in Warsaw holds another album by Siemiradzki (inv. MNW Rys. Pol. 8962/1-84), which contains a number of preparatory drawings for The Sinner (8962/9-26, 42, 46, 49, 50). These drawings, executed in pencil on sheets of paper measuring 20.6 × 17.4 cm, include A Female Figure (a study for a sinner, Inventory No. 8262/9), The Sinner and the Apostle John (Inventory No. 8962/11; in contrast to the final version of the canvas, the apostle is to the right of the sinner), The Apostle John (Inventory No. 8962/12), an anatomical study of arm muscles and a sketch of a face (Inventory No. 8962/14), Kneeling Woman (a study for the sinner, Inventory No. 8962/19), as well as two compositional sketches (Inventory No. 8962/21 and 8962/26).

Graphic studies and a sketch from the collection of the National Museum in Warsaw

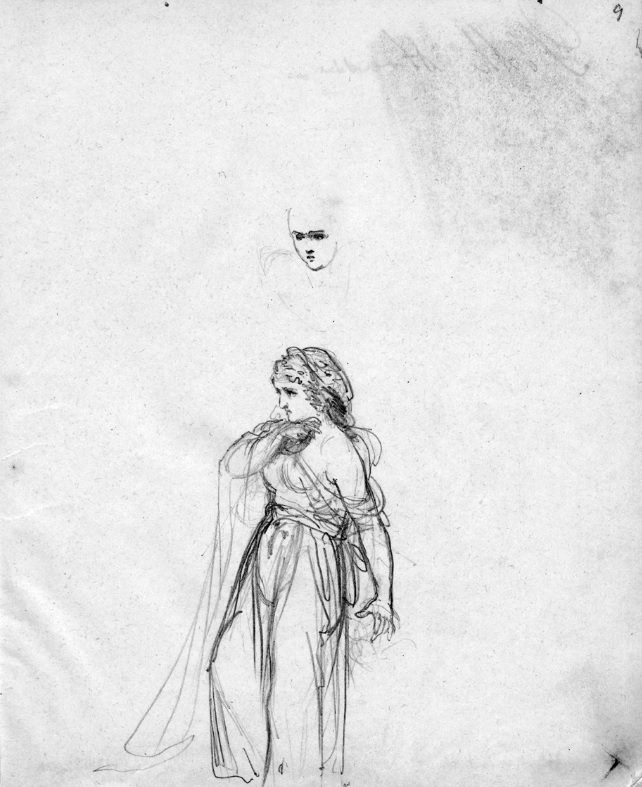
Female figure (inv. 8962/9)

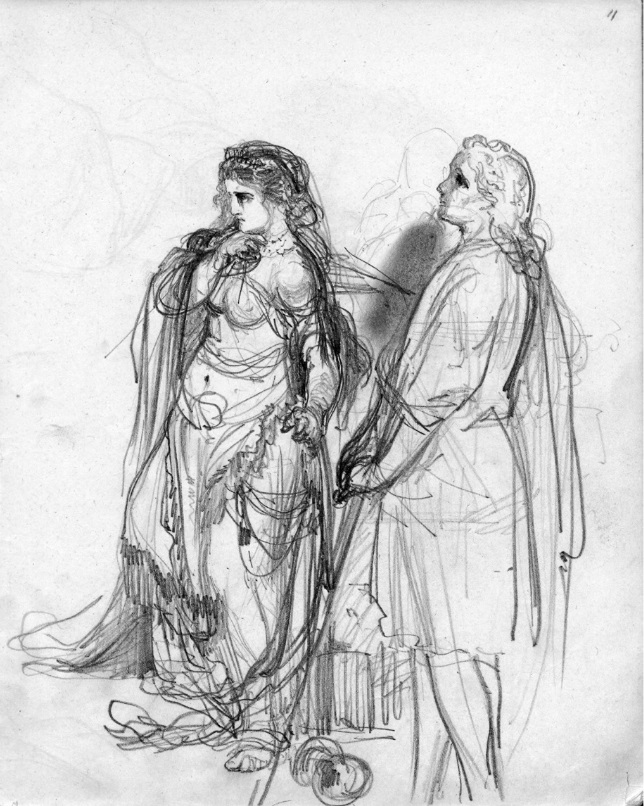
The Sinner and the Apostle John (inv. 8962/11)

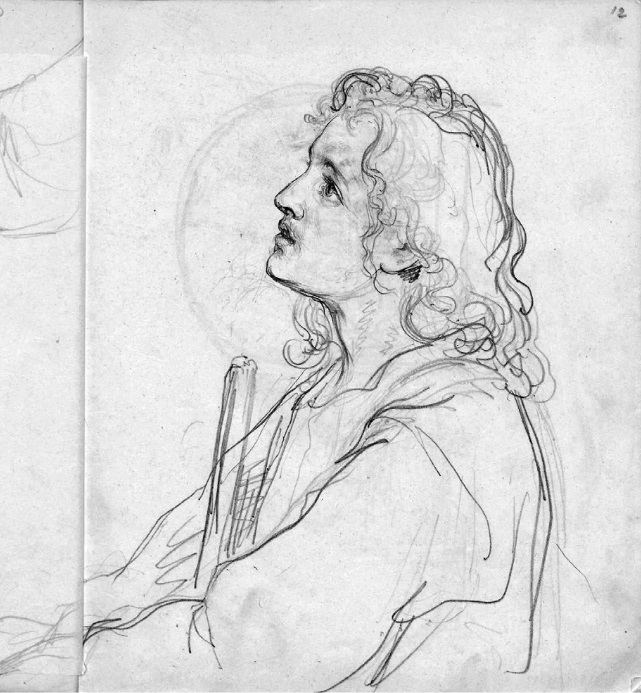
The Apostle John (inv. 8962/12)

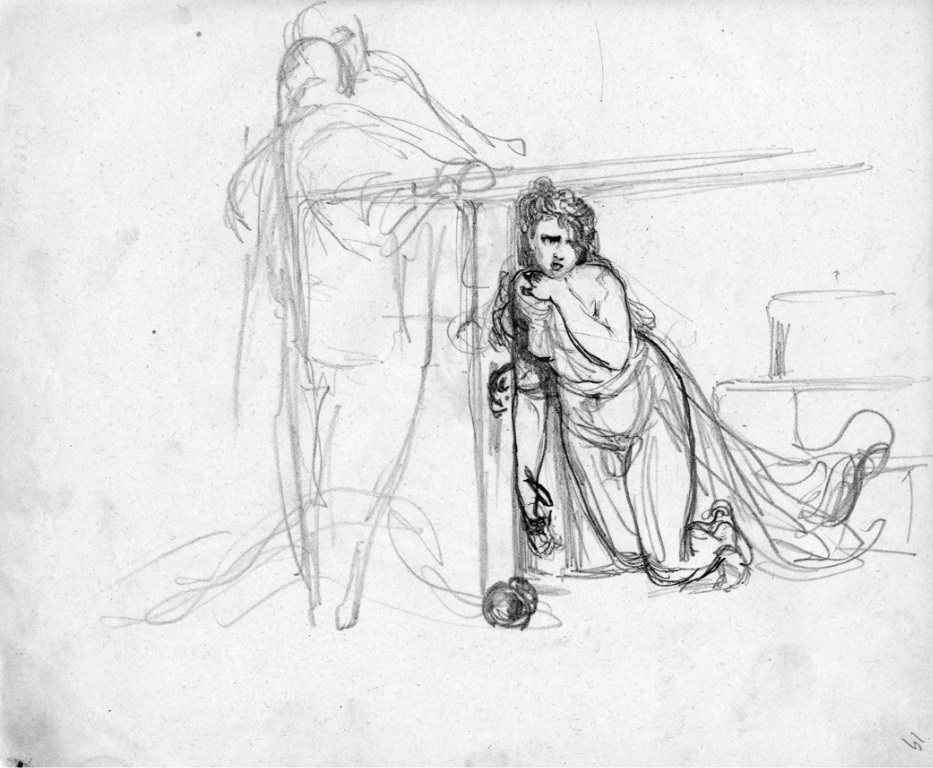
A woman kneeling (inv. 8962/19)

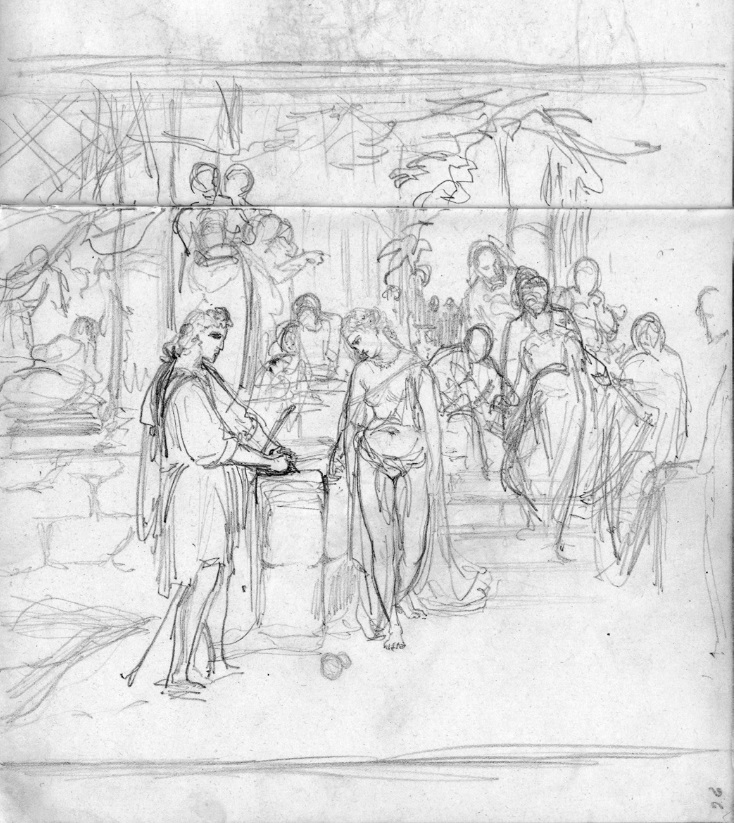
Sketch (inv. 8962/26)

Two sketches, entitled The Sinner or Christ and Sinner, are held in the State Russian Museum. In one of the sketches, an original variant executed in graphite pencil on paper, duplicated on whatman paper (34.6 × 55.5 cm, 1871–1872, Inventory P-56734), the sinner and her merry companions are situated on the left, while Christ is positioned to the right of the sinner, with his disciples and followers at a distance from him. This sketch was acquired by the museum in 1976 from M. P. Glinka (Leningrad). Another sketch executed in watercolour and graphite pencil on paper, duplicated on filtered restoration paper (21 × 40.2 cm or 21 × 41.1 cm, 1872, inv. P-54219), shows Christ with a group of his followers on the left side of the composition, in a similar position to that on the main canvas. According to art historian Daira Lebedeva, in this sketch "the basic light and shade development of the future painting is found, which is aimed at plein air, at revealing in it the elements of sunlight and light and air environment". The sketch was purchased in 1962 from I. I. Faltus (Dubno, Rivne Oblast, UkSSR).

Sketches for the painting Christ and Sinner

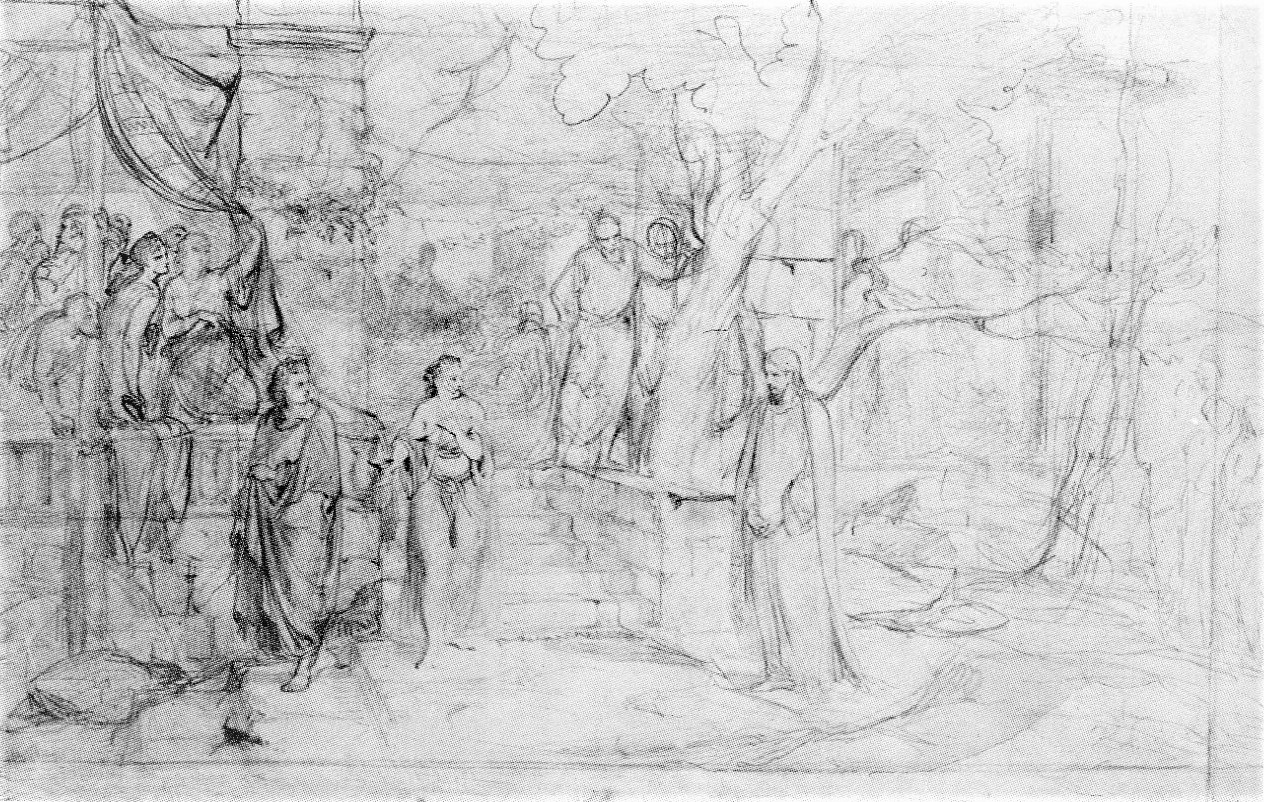
The Sinner (sketch, graphite pencil, 34.6 × 55.5 cm, State Russian Museum, inv. P-56734})

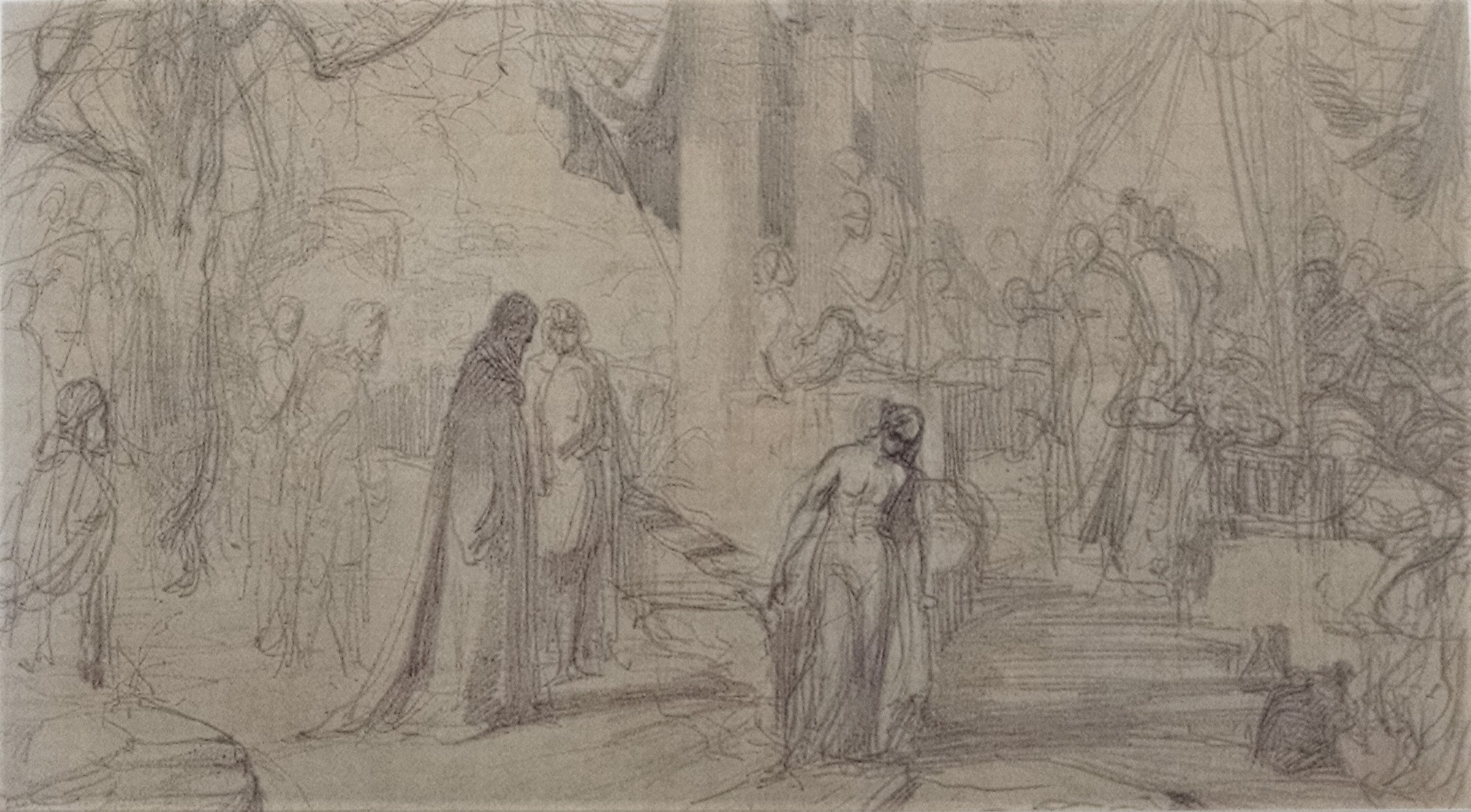
The Sinner (sketch, graphite pencil, National Museum in Kraków)

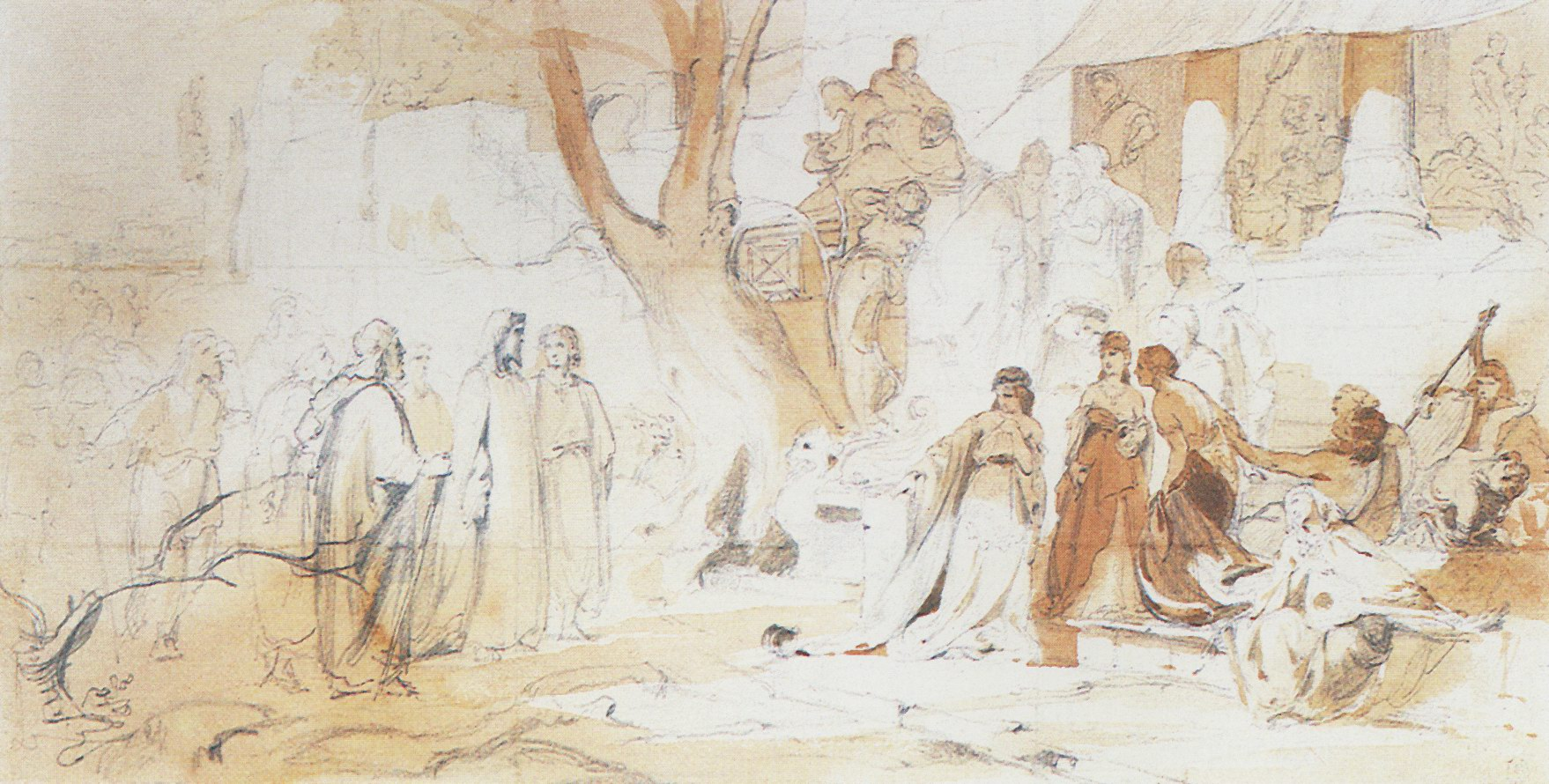
The Sinner (sketch, watercolour and graphite pencil, 21 × 40, State Russian Museum, inv. P-54219)

The Novgorod State United Museum-Reserve collection includes a version (alleged sketch) of the painting Christ and Sinner under the same name (canvas, oil on canvas, 34.6 × 69.1 cm, 1872, inv. RZh-85). The painting was acquired by the Novgorod Museum in late 1945 through the Leningrad State Purchase Commission and entered the museum's collection in October 1947. Additionally, it is known that a pictorial study entitled "Head of a Sinner" (canvas, oil, 54 × 42 cm) exists in a private collection.

Sketch, study and author's repetition of the painting Christ and Sinner

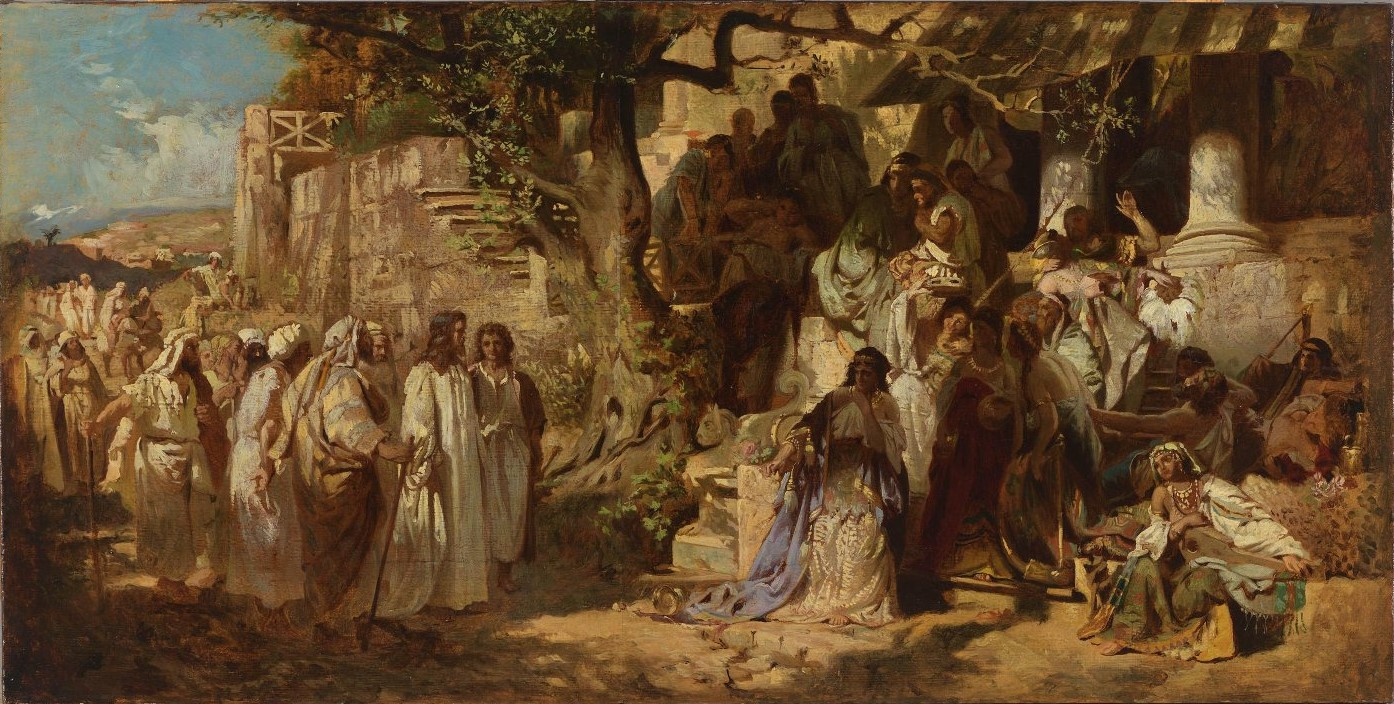
Christ and Sinner (sketch, canvas, oil, Novgorod Museum-Reserve)

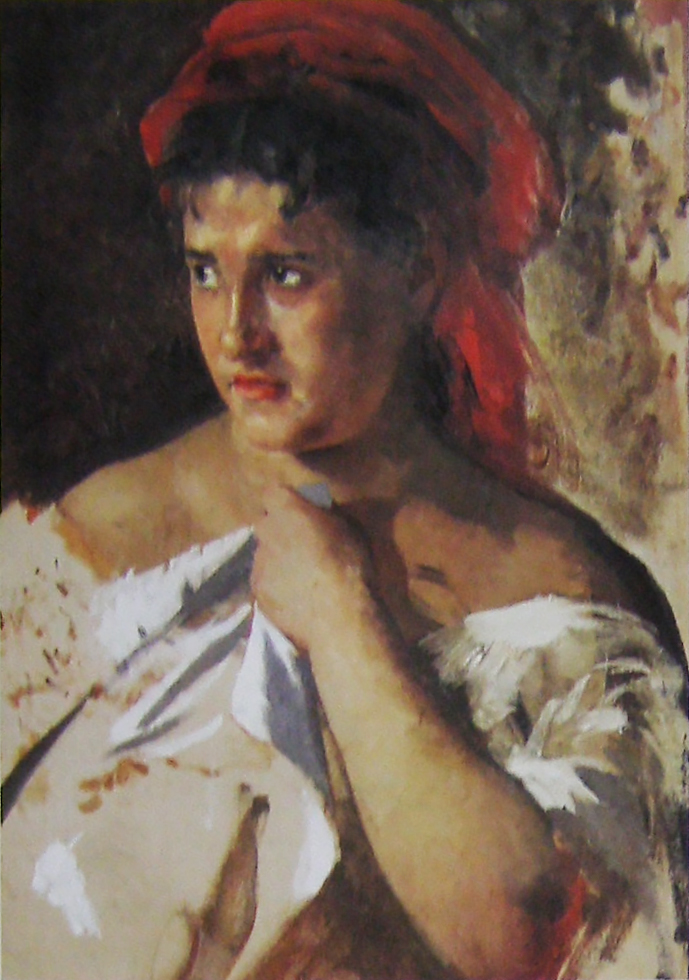
Head of the Sinner (sketch, canvas, oil, private collection)

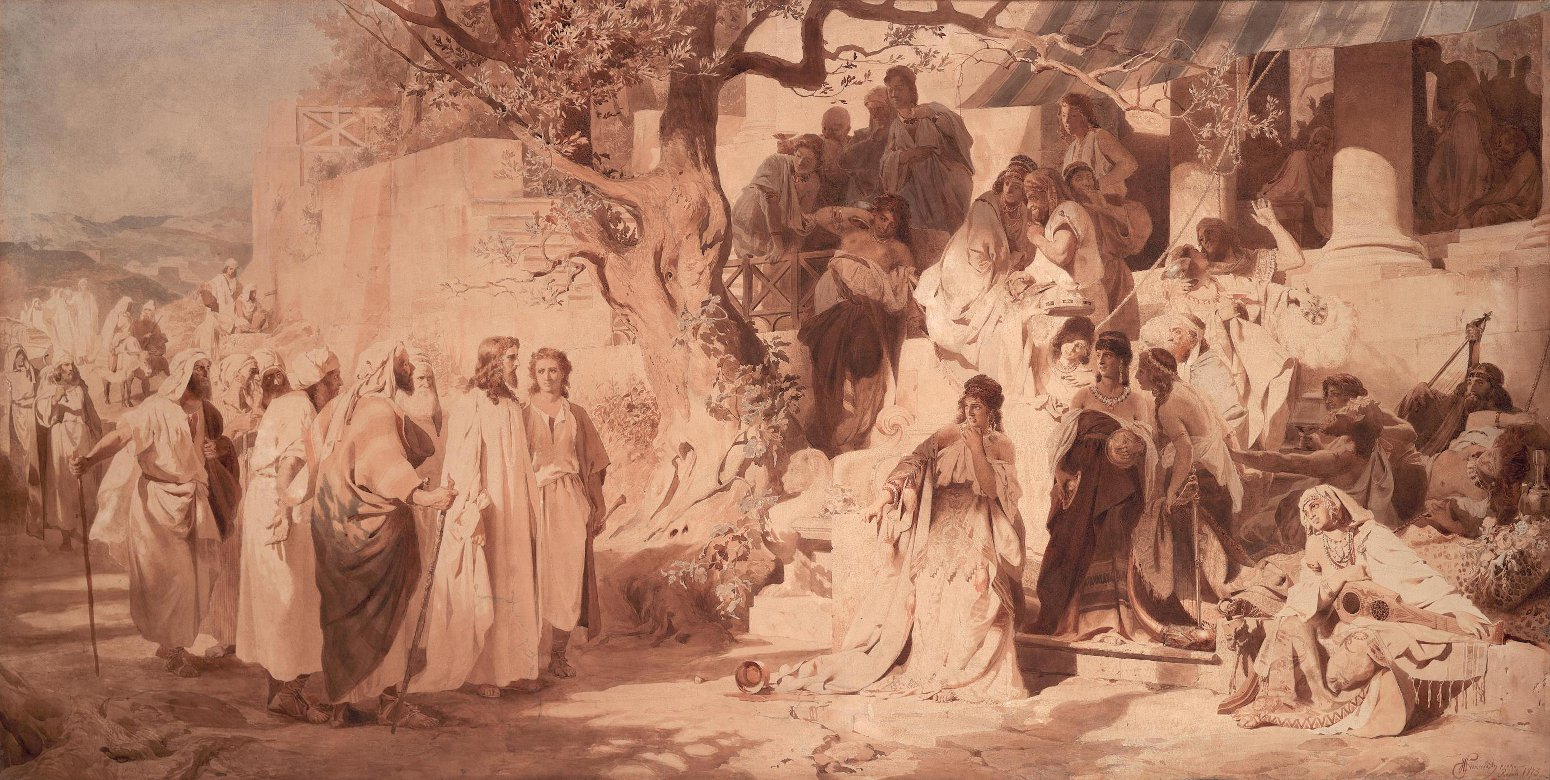
Christ and Sinner (paper, sepia and watercolour, Rybinsk Museum-Reserve)

The Rybinsk State Historical-Architectural and Art Museum-Reserve possesses the artist's replica of Christ and Sinner, executed in sepia on paper (61 × 132 cm) and dated 1873 or 1874. The museum's website specifies that the material and technique are paper on paper, sepia and black watercolour (inv. G-4708). The painting was transferred to the museum in 1921 from the Petrograd Expert Commission at the People's Ministry of Foreign Trade of the RSFSR. Apparently, this is the exact replica that was commissioned by Grand Duke Vladimir Alexandrovich.

Another reduced author's reproduction of Christ and Sinner (canvas, oil, 123 × 240 cm, 1873?), is held in the art gallery of the Pskov State United Historical, Architectural and Art Museum-Reserve. The painting was acquired from the collection of Ivan Mikhailovich Voronov (Archimandrite Alipiy, vicar of the Pskov-Caves Monastery). Another author's repetition of the painting Christ and Sinner (canvas, oil, 145 × 240 cm), was discovered in the early 21st century in a private collection in Zurich.

== Reviews and criticism ==
Art critic Vladimir Stasov, in his article "Twenty-Five Years of Russian Art", published in 1883, wrote that Siemiradzki's painting Christ and Sinner made a great impression on the public, especially "with its brilliant colouring" and "its dandy colourful spots". Nevertheless, according to Stasov, Siemiradzki's painting "cannot in any way join" such religious paintings as Ivan Kramskoi's Christ in the Desert and Nikolai Ge's Last Supper. Stasov noted that Siemiradzki's painting is "superficial in content", that the Sinner looks like "a modern Parisian operetta cocotte Offenbach", and that "Christ and the Sinner and the Apostles consist of the same costume to such an extent that it makes no sense to speak of it as a serious historical creation".

In a letter to the landscape painter Fyodor Vasilyev dated 10 April 1873, the artist Ivan Kramskoi described the impression made on him by Siemiradzki's Christ and Sinner. Kramskoy wrote that "the painting is unremarkable", and it is "written so boldly and colourfully, in the sense of the selection of colours (rather than organic colouring), so strong in light shading, and so much external movement and effect in it that the public is simply amazed". According to the artist, the painting "makes for the first time an imposing impression", under which he himself was for around twenty minutes. At the same time Kramskoy noted the falsity, which, in particular, can be seen in the treatment of the main characters depicted on the canvas: "Christ is such an insignificant person that for him no sinner will repent, and the sinner herself is not one of those who give up a cheerful life". Kramskoy also notes the falsity of the painting, particularly in the treatment of the main characters depicted on the canvas: "Christ is such an insignificant person that for him no sinner will repent, and the sinner herself is not one of those who give up a cheerful life".

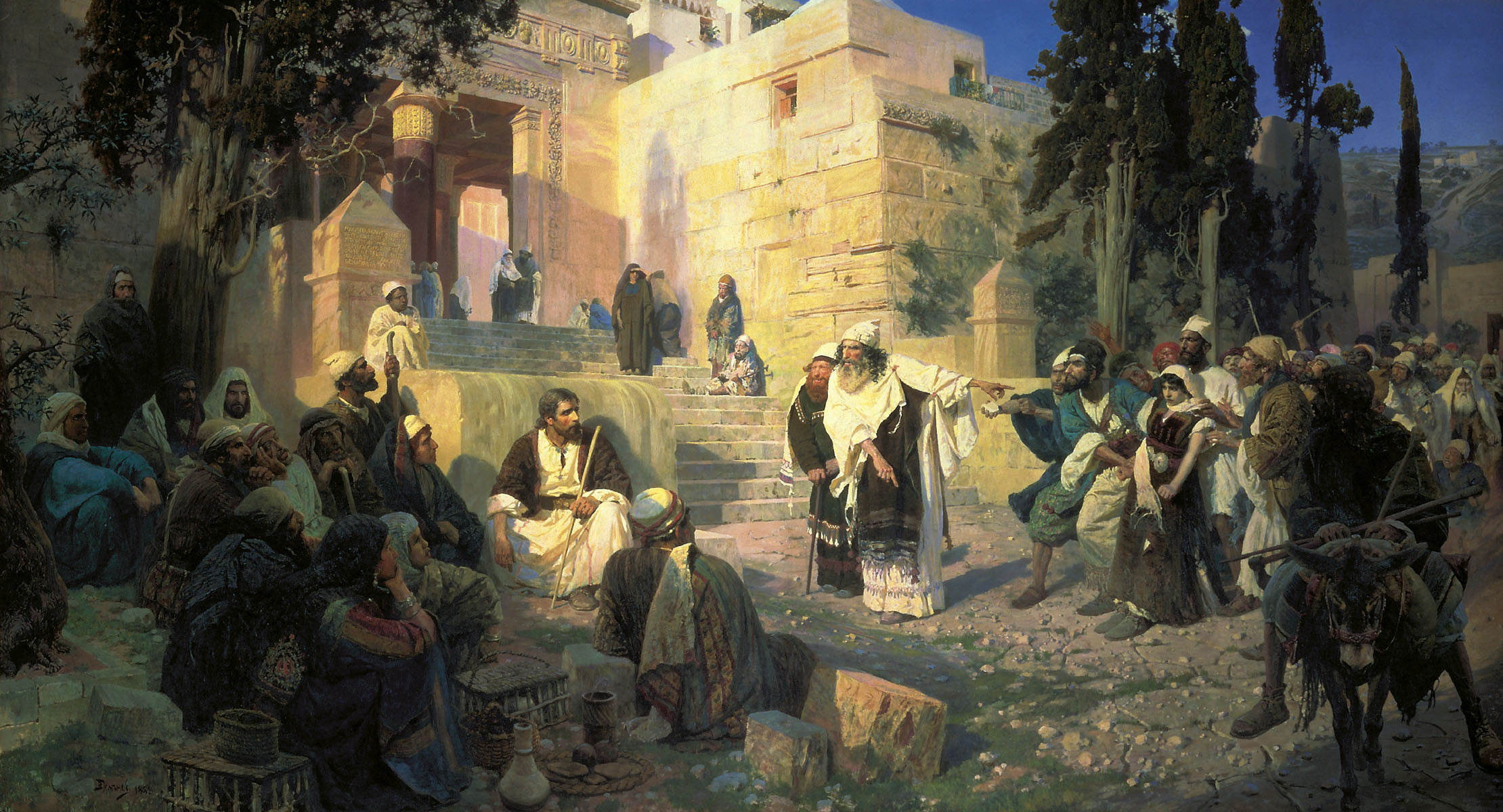
Vasily Polenov. Christ and the Woman Taken in Adultery (1887, State Russian Museum)

Art historian Pavel Klimov noted that the Peredvizhniki, of which Kramskoy was a member, were disinclined to accept the emergence of a figure as prominent and influential as Siemiradzki within the academic community. from the opponents' point of view, the success of Christ and Sinner "testified to the vitality of academism, which they had repeatedly ridiculed and scorned," and which, in their opinion, was soon to be rejected by viewers, customers and collectors alike. According to Klimov, this attitude led to Siemiradzki being regarded by the Peredvizhniki at the very beginning of his career "as the striking force of the Academy and the main rival with whom an uncompromising struggle should be waged."

Art historian Tatiana Karpova noted that in the painting Christ and Sinner, Siemiradzki "for the first time found his main trick - the use of plein air effects in a large canvas painted on a subject from the distant past", and that at that time "this was new for Russian art". As Karpova observed, the combination of plein air painting and the Gospel narrative created "an impression of illusion, authenticity, reality of legendary events". This approach was in line with the prevailing trend of biblical studies at the time (Ernest Renan and others), which sought to treat Jesus Christ as a real historical figure. In comparing Siemiradzki's work with Vasily Polenov's later painting on the same subject, Christ and the Woman Taken in Adultery (1887, State Russian Museum), Karpova posited that both paintings "cannot be recognised as undisputed masterpieces in the biographies of these artists, but they became extremely important milestones in their creative evolution".

== Bibliography ==
- Архипова, А. В. (1994). "Комментарии: Ф. М. Достоевский. Дневник писателя. 1873. IX. По поводу выставки" [Comments: F. M. Dostoevsky. Diary of a writer. 1873. IX. Concerning the exhibition]. Ф. М. Достоевский. Собрание сочинений в 15 томах [F. M. Dostoevsky. Collected Works in 15 Volumes] (in Russian). Vol. 12. Nauka. pp. 335–345.
- Варначёва, Л. В. (2019). "Проблема воплощения христианского сюжета в академической живописи. Творчество Генриха Семирадского" [The problem of the embodiment of the Christian subject in academic painting. Creativity of Henryk Siemiradzki]. Культура и гуманитарные науки в современном мире (2). Saint Petersburg: Фора-принт: 25–33. ISBN 978-5-903187-36-2.
- Зорина, Е.Г. (2008). Семирадский [Siemiradzki] (in Russian). Moscow: Bely Gorod. ISBN 978-5-7793-1431-2.
- Капырина, С.Л. (2016). "Путь к картине. Фотография в творческом методе Г. И. Семирадского" [The way to the painting. Photography in the creative method of H. H. Siemiradzki] (PDF). Sztuka Europy Wschodniej (in Russian). 4: 199–209.
- Капырина, С.Л. (2022). "Генрих Семирадский и Микеле Манг: путь к картине" [Henryk Siemiradzki and Michele Mang: The Road to Painting]. Генрих Семирадский. По примеру богов [Henryk Siemiradzki. Following the example of the gods] (in Russian). Moscow: State Tretyakov Gallery. pp. 232–253. ISBN 978-5-89580-366-0.
- Карпова, Т.Л. (2008). Генрих Семирадский: Альбом [Henryk Siemiradzki: Album] (in Russian). Saint Petersburg: Золотой век. ISBN 978-5-342-00116-8.
- Карпова, Т.Л. (2020). "Семирадский и Поленов" [Siemiradzki and Polenov.] (PDF). Художественная культура (in Russian) (4): 184–211.
- Климов, П.Ю. (2001). Генрих Семирадский [Henryk Siemiradzki] (in Russian). Арт-Родник. ISBN 5-88896-050-0.
- Копшицер, М.И. (2010). Поленов [Polenov]. The Lives of Remarkable People (in Russian). Moscow: Molodaya Gvardiya. ISBN 978-5-235-03383-2.
- Кочемасова, Т.А. (2001). Генрих Семирадский [Henryk Siemiradzki] (in Russian). Moscow: Bely Gorod. ISBN 978-5-7793-0333-0.
- Лебедева, Д.Н. (2006). Генрих Семирадский [Henryk Siemiradzki] (in Russian). Moscow: Арт-Родник. ISBN 5-9561-0175-X.
- Маркова, Н.К. (2016). "О графическом наследии Генриха Семирадского" [On the graphic heritage of Henryk Siemiradzki] (PDF). Sztuka Europy Wschodniej (in Russian). 4: 211–223.
- Нестерова, Е.В. (2004). Поздний академизм и Салон: Альбом [Late Academicism and Salon: Album]. Коллекция русской живописи (in Russian). Saint Petersburg: Aurora; Золотой век. ISBN 5-342-00090-4.
- Овсянников, С.Н. (2006). "Художественные сокровища провинциального Рыбинска" [Artistic treasures of provincial Rybinsk]. Русское искусство (in Russian) (2): 45–51.
- Петинова, Е.Ф. (2001). Русские художники XVIII — начала XX века [Russian artists of the 18th - early 20th century] (in Russian). Saint Petersburg: Aurora. ISBN 978-5-7300-0714-7.
- Романовский, А.С. (2005). Академизм в русской живописи [Academism in Russian painting]. Энциклопедия мирового искусства (in Russian). Moscow: Bely Gorod. ISBN 5-7793-0904-3.
- Сахарова, Е.В. (1964). Василий Дмитриевич Поленов, Елена Дмитриевна Поленова. Хроника семьи художников [Vasily Dmitrievich Polenov, Elena Dmitrievna Polenova. Chronicle of the family of artists] (in Russian). Moscow: Iskusstvo.
- Stasov, Vlaimir (1952). Избранные сочинения: живопись, скульптура, музыка [Selected Works: Painting, Sculpture, Music] (in Russian). Vol. 1. Moscow: Iskusstvo.
- Stasov, Vladimir (1952). Избранные сочинения: живопись, скульптура, музыка [Selected Works: Painting, Sculpture, Music] (in Russian). Vol. 2. Moscow: Iskusstvo.
- Chistyakov, Pavel (1953). Письма, записки, воспоминания [Letters, notes, memoirs] (in Russian). Ely Bielutin, Н. М. Молева. Moscow: Iskusstvo.
- Юрова, Т.В. (1972). Василий Дмитриевич Поленов [Vasily Dmitrievich Polenov] (in Russian). Moscow: Iskusstvo.
- Государственный Русский музей — Живопись, XVIII — начало XX века (каталог) [State Russian Museum - Painting, 18th - early 20th century (catalogue)] (in Russian). Leningrad: Aurora and Iskusstvo. 1980.
- Государственный Русский музей — каталог собрания [State Russian Museum - catalogue of the collection] (in Russian). Vol. 7: Живопись второй половины XIX века (Н—Я). В. А. Леняшин. Saint Petersburg: Palace Editions. 2017. ISBN 978-3-906917-17-7.
- Государственный Русский музей — Из истории музея [State Russian Museum - From the history of the museum] (in Russian). И. Н. Карасик, Е. Н. Петрова. State Russian Museum. 1995. ISBN 5-900872-04-1.
- "Живопись" [Painting]. Генрих Семирадский. По примеру богов [Heinrich Siemiradzki. Following the example of the gods] (in Russian). Moscow: State Tretyakov Gallery. 2022. pp. 85–200. ISBN 978-5-89580-366-0.
- Иллюстрированный каталог Художественного отдела Всероссийской выставки в Москве, 1882 г. [Illustrated catalogue of the Art Department of the All-Russian Exhibition in Moscow, 1882.] (in Russian). Н. П. Собко. Saint Petersburg: Publisher Mikhail Botkin. 1882.
- Крамской об искусстве [Kramskoy on art] (in Russian). Т. М. Коваленская. Moscow: Изобразительное искусство. 1988. ISBN 5-85200-015-9.
- "Рисунок" [Drawing]. Генрих Семирадский. По примеру богов [Henryk Siemiradzki. Following the example of the gods] (in Russian). Moscow: State Tretyakov Gallery. 2022. pp. 201–231. ISBN 978-5-89580-366-0.
- Сохраняя историю. Реставрационным мастерским Русского музея — 100 лет [Preserving History. Restoration workshops of the Russian Museum are 100 years old] (in Russian). Т. Медведева, В. А. Гусев, Е. Н. Петрова. Saint Petersburg: Palace Editions. 2022. ISBN 978-5-93332-719-6.
- Biały, Aneta; Adamczyk, Paulina (2016). "Monachijski tygiel, włoskie przestrzenie — rok z życia Henryka Siemiradzkiego: rysunki z pobytu w Monachium, pierwszej podróży do Włoch oraz szkice do obrazu Jawnogrzesznica w zbiorach Muzeum Narodowego w Warszawie" (PDF). Sztuka Europy Wschodniej (in Polish). 4: 55–75.
- Biedrońska-Słotowa, Beata (2017). "Tkaniny i ubiory w obrazach Henryka Siemiradzkiego". Sztuka Europy Wschodniej (in Polish). 5: 143–147. doi:10.11588/diglit.45642.
- Bogdan, Veronica-Irina (2020). "Henryk Siemiradzki on the world and international exhibitions" (PDF). Henryk Siemiradzki and the International Artistic Milieu in Rome: 253–259. ISBN 978-83-63305-88-8.
- Gerc, Lidia (2020). ""Thinks like Dante, handles paints like Boccaccio". About Henryk Siemiradzki in Vienna" (PDF). Henryk Siemiradzki and the International Artistic Milieu in Rome: 261–278. ISBN 978-83-63305-88-8.
- Haake, Michał (2020). "Realism and figuralism. On Christ and the Harlot by Henryk Siemiradzki" (PDF). Henryk Siemiradzki and the International Artistic Milieu in Rome: 119–134. ISBN 978-83-63305-88-8.
- Pniewski, Dariusz (2016). "Jezus i kobiety Siemiradzkiego: opinie krytyki o Jawnogrzesznicy" (PDF). Sztuka Europy Wschodniej (in Polish). 4: 77–85.
