= Philip of Acarnania =

Friend and physician of Alexander the Great

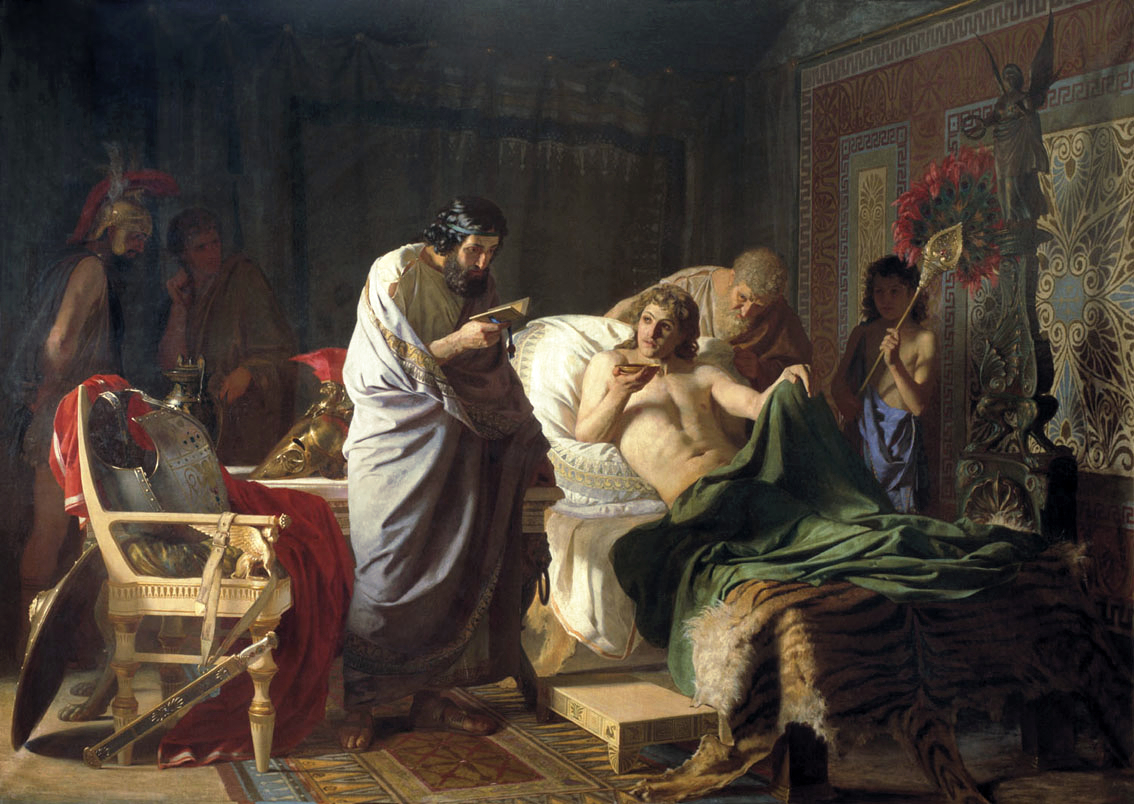
Alexander the Great's trust in Doctor Philip, painting by Henryk Siemiradzki (1870s)

Philip of Acarnania (Ancient Greek: Φίλιππος) was friend and physician of Alexander the Great, of whom a well-known story is told by several ancient authors. He was the means of saving the king's life, when he had been seized with a severe attack of fever, brought on by bathing in the cold waters of the river Cydnus in Cilicia, after being violently heated and had to cool down, 333 BC. Parmenion sent to warn Alexander that Philip had been bribed by Darius III to poison him; the king, however, would not believe the information, nor doubt the fidelity of his physician, but, while he drank off the draught prepared for him, he put into his hands the letter he had just received, fixing his eyes at the same time steadily on his countenance. A well-known modern picture represents this incident; and the king's speedy recovery fully justified his confidence in the skill and honesty of his physician.

Philip was still Alexander’s doctor at the siege of Gaza in 332 BC, as Curtius reports that he extracted an arrow from the king’s shoulder (QC 4.6.17-20)
