= Pyotr Gnedich =

Russian writer, poet, dramatist, translator, theatre entrepreneur and art history scholar

Pyotr Gnedich Петр Гнедич
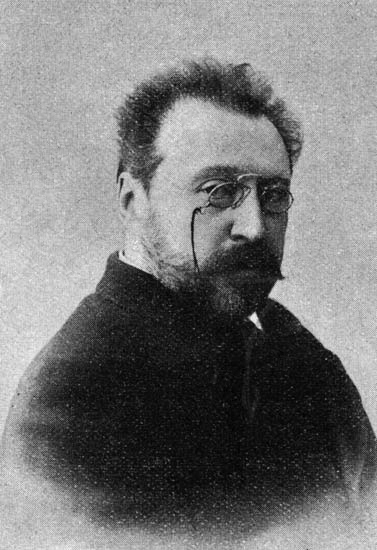
- Born: 30 October 1855; Saint Petersburg, Russian Empire
- Died: 16 July 1925 (aged 69); Leningrad, Soviet Union
- Writing career
- Genres: fiction, poetry, memoirs

Pyotr Petrovich Gnedich (Russian: Пётр Петро́вич Гне́дич, IPA: [ˈpʲɵtr pʲɪˈtrovʲɪtɕ ˈɡnʲedʲɪtɕ]; 18 October [O.S. 30 October] 1855 – July 16, 1925), also known as Gnedich-Smolensky, was a Russian writer, poet, dramatist, translator, theatre entrepreneur and art history scholar. He was a grandnephew of Russian poet and translator Nikolay Gnedich. He is considered one of the founders of art history.

Gnedich wrote more than 40 plays (7 of them historical) and several novels (Chinese Shadows, 1884, The Burden of this World, 1897). Anton Chekhov praised Gnedich's talent; the two authors have often been linked together by contemporary critics who also noted Gnedich's erudition and artfulness as a stylist. Pyotr Gnedich's best known non-fiction works were the History of Art from Ancient Times (1885), arguably the first popular Russian treatise of this kind, and his memoirs Book of Life (1929).
