= Iskusstvo Publishing House =

Iskusstvo (Russian: Искусство, romanized: Iskusstvo, English: "art") was a major state publishing house in the Soviet Union. Headquartered in Moscow, it published books on art history and aesthetics, history and theory of fine arts and architecture, theater and drama, cinema and photography, television and radio broadcasting, collections for amateur performances, plays, film scripts, as well as art albums. It was established in 1938 by merging two publishers, Изогиз (Izogiz) and Искусство.

In the Russian Federation it has been reorganized into a state-owned unitary enterprise under the same name (official name: Государственное унитарное предприятие "Издательство "Искусство") controlled by the Federal Agency for Press and Mass Media.

== Book series ==
- «История эстетики в памятниках и документах» (History of Aesthetics in Monuments and Documents)
- «Человек. События. Время» (Human. Events. Time)
- «Жизнь в искусстве» (Life in Art)
- «Шедевры советского кино» (Masterpieces of Soviet Cinema)
- «Мастера советского искусства» (Masters of Soviet Art)
- «Памятники искусства Советского Союза» (Monuments of Art of the Soviet Union) - jointly published with Edition Leipzig, German Democratic Republic
- «Библиотека киномеханика» (The Projectionist's Library)
- «Мир художника» (The World of the Artist)
