= Pavel Korin =

Russian painter (1892–1967)

- Павел Корин
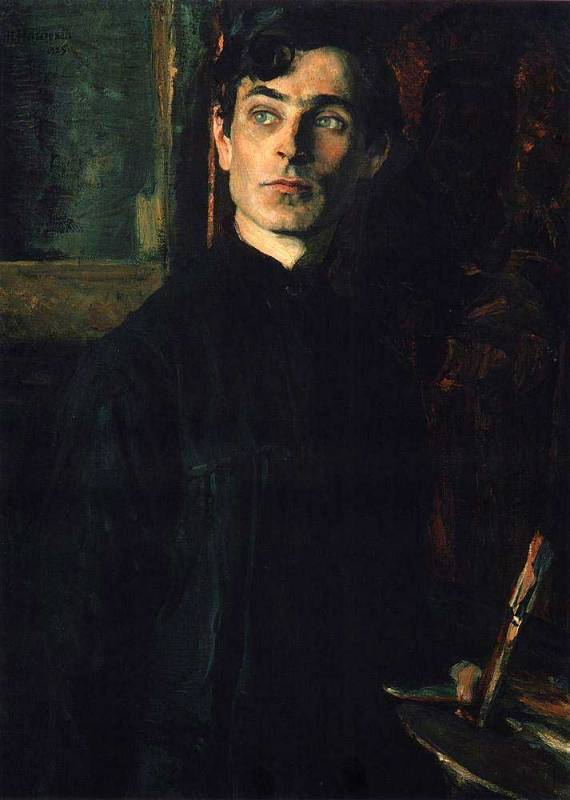
- A 1930 portrait by Mikhail Nesterov
- Born: June 25, 1892; Palekh, Russian Empire
- Died: November 22, 1967 (aged 75)
- Resting place: Novodevichy Cemetery
- Education: Moscow School of Painting, Sculpture and Architecture
- Known for: Painter, art restorer
- Notable work: Farewell to Rus

Pavel Dmitriyevich Korin (Russian: Павел Дмитриевич Корин; 8 July [O.S. 26 June] 1892 - 22 November 1967) was a Russian painter and art restorer. He is famous for his preparational work for the unimplemented painting Farewell to Rus.

== Life and career ==
Pavel Korin was born in the village of Palekh, Vyaznikovsky Uyezd, Russian Empire (now in Ivanovo Oblast) to a family of a professional icon-painter Dmitry Nikolayevich Korin. In 1897, when Pavel was only five years old, his father died. In 1903-1907, he studied at the School for Icon Painting at Palekh getting a formal certificate as a professional icon-painter. In 1908, he moved to Moscow and until 1911 worked there at the icon shop of the Don Monastery.

In 1911, he worked as an apprentice to Mikhail Nesterov on frescoes of The Intercession Church at the Convent of Martha and Mary (Marfo-Mariinsky) on Bolshaya Ordynka Street in Moscow. Nesterov insisted that Korin gain a formal education in easel painting and arranged his admission to the Moscow School of Painting, Sculpture and Architecture in 1912. Pavel graduated from that school in 1916, having been a student of Konstantin Korovin and Leonid Pasternak.

In 1916, he worked on frescoes for the mausoleum of Grand Duchess Elizabeth Fyodorovna at The Intercession Church at the Convent of Martha and Mary. In accordance with the wishes of the Grand Duchess, he traveled to Yaroslavl and Rostov to study traditional frescoes of antique Russian churches.

Portrait of sculptor Sergey Konenkov, 1947

In February 1917, he started to work in his attic studio on Arbat Street in Moscow and worked there until 1934.

In 1918-1919, he taught at the 2nd State Art Studios (2-ые ГСХМ). In 1919-1920 he worked at the Anatomic theatre of Moscow State University, as he thought that, as a painter, he needed deeper knowledge of the human anatomy. In the evenings he copied paintings and sculptures of the Museum of Fine Arts.

In 1923, he traveled over Northern Russia, visiting Vologda, Staraya Ladoga, Ferapontov Monastery, and Novgorod. In 1926-1931, he worked as an instructor of painting classes for beginners at the Museum of Fine Arts.

In 1926, the Convent of Martha and Mary was closed by the Soviets and all the art there was to be destroyed. Pavel and his brother Alexander managed to smuggle out and save the iconostasis and some of the frescoes. On March 7 of that year he married Praskovya Tikhonovna Petrova, a disciple of the Convent of Martha and Mary.

In 1927, Korin's aquarelle Artist's studio and his oil landscape My Motherland were bought by the Tretyakov gallery, showing recognition from the Soviets.

In 1931, Korin's studio was visited by Maxim Gorky, who supported Korin since. In 1932, Korin followed Gorky to Sorrento, painted Gorky's portrait, and visited Italy and Germany.

In 1931, Korin started to work as the Head of the Restoration Shop of Museum of the Foreign Art (former Museum of Fine Arts later Pushkin Museum). He held this position for until 1959. After this he held the position of the Director of the State Central Art Restoration Works (ГЦРХМ) until his death. As one of the most senior Russian restorers of the time he contributed enormously to the saving and restoration of famous paintings.

In 1933, Korin moved to the studio on Malaya Pirogovka Street in Moscow where he worked until his death. Now the building is Korin's museum.

In the 1940s, he painted many portraits of members of the Soviet intelligentsia (including Leonid Leonidov, Mikhail Nesterov, Alexey Tolstoy, Kachalov and Nadezhda Peshkova (Gorky's daughter in law)). He painted the fresco Match to the Future for the Palace of Soviets in the Moscow Kremlin and a Triptych devoted to Alexander Nevsky.

Farewell to Rus, preparational drawing showing the composition, 1935-1959

In the 1950s, Korin worked on mosaics for the Moscow Metro. His mosaics decorate the stations Komsomolskaya-Koltsevaya, Arbatskaya (Arbatsko-Pokrovskaya Line) and Novoslobodskaya, and also the Main Hall (Актовый Зал) of Moscow State University. He also won an impressive list of Soviet awards in the 1950s and 1960s:

- Stalin Prize - 1954 for mosaics for the station Komsomolskaya-Koltsevaya,
- Lenin Prize - 1963 for portraits of Martiros Saryan, group portrait of cartoonists Kukryniksy, Italian painter Renato Guttuso
- Member of Academy of Arts of Soviet Union - since 1958
- Gold medal on World's Fair at Brussels - 1958 for the portrait of Martiros Saryan,
- People's Artist of the Russian SFSR 1958
- People's Artist of the USSR - 1962 ()
- Order of Lenin - 1967
- Medal "For Valiant Labour in the Great Patriotic War 1941–1945"
- Medal "In Commemoration of the 800th Anniversary of Moscow"

Pavel Korin died in Moscow on 22 November 1967 and was buried in the Novodevichy Cemetery.

Photo of Korin's studio showing the canvas for the Farewell to Rus drawing, 1960s

== Farewell to Rus ==
The biography of Korin shows an accomplished Soviet painter and a prominent art figure, but the job he had considered the main work of his life was left unfinished. During his student years Korin was impressed by the life of Alexander Ivanov, who spent most of his adult life in creating a single painting The Appearance of Christ before the People (1835–1857). Pavel decided that he should live by Ivanov's example and devote his whole life to a single large painting. He began by preparing a very accurate, life sized copy of Ivanov's masterpiece (1920–1925). The initial name for this painting was Bless the Lord, oh my soul (Благослови, душе моя, Господа).

In 1925 Korin witnessed the funeral service of Patriarch Tikhon of Moscow in the Cathedral of the Dormition of Moscow Kremlin. All people of importance in the Russian Orthodox Church, usually suppressed by the Soviets, were present. After the event Pavel decided that his magnum opus would be named Requiem, or Requiem for Russia, and would depict the funeral service of Patriarch Tikhon and show the Russia that was lost after the October Revolution.

Beggar, Etude for Farewell to Rus, 1933

Korin feverishly painted people present at the burial service for Tikhon, often the last survivors of families of Russian nobility, or dissident priests, soon to be destroyed. Rumors about the dangerous painting soon became a matter of NKVD interest. In 1931 Maxim Gorky advised Korin that the name Requiem for Russia was too strong to be accepted and recommended a change to Русь Уходящая - literally Rus that is going away, but usually translated as Farewell to Rus. Gorky believed that the painting showing the last parade of the Orthodox Church, depicting the tragedy and at the same time the misery of those people who would disappear into irrelevancy, would be accepted and even well received by the Government. Korin agreed to the new name of the painting.

For forty years Korin worked on the painting. He produced dozens of large (more than life size), detailed paintings that he preferred to call etudes for the Farewell to Rus masterpiece; he worked on composition. He ordered a huge canvas, designed a special stretcher for it, and spent years coating the canvas with multiple layers of the special underlays. Korin was combining the ancient methods of the icon paintings with the science of art restorations and claimed the painting prepared by his methods should survive hundreds, possibly thousands of years without the need for restoration.

In his lifetime, he had not put a single brushstroke on the canvas - forty-two years of preparational work was not enough for Pavel Korin. Though some might consider it an extreme case of procrastination, the huge canvas became a popular art exhibit in the Korin Museum. Many consider it as an art masterpiece in its own right, similar to the Black Square of Kazimir Malevich.

== The Decoration of the Komsomolskaya Koltsevaya station ==
Komsomolskaya-Koltsevaya station opened in 1952. Alexey Shchusev was the main architect. He invited Korin to work at the station design. Korin decided to decorate it with monumental panels. There are eight of them. Each one is framed by stucco molding. And the yellow ceiling is also decorated with mosaic inserts and stucco molding.

There are images of Alexander Nevsky, Dmitry Donskoy, Kuzma Minin, Dmitry Pozharsky, Alexander Suvorov, Mikhail Kutuzov, Vladimir Lenin, the capture of the Reichstag and the Triumph of victory. They are arranged in chronological order. Pavel Dmitrievich was attentive to all the details of the work of the mosaicists and especially carefully monitored a set of portrait images.

These examples were there to inspire the Soviet people, as well as glorify the deeds of other Russian heroes. Joseph Stalin mentioned all these historical figures and events in his speech before the parade on 7 November 1941. “The war you are waging is a war of liberation,” Stalin exclaimed, “a just war. Let the manly images of our great ancestors—Alexander Nevsky, Dimitry Donskoy, Kuzma Minin, Dimitry Pozharsky, Alexander Suvorov and Mikhail Kutuzov—inspire you in this war! May the victorious banner of the great Lenin be your North star!”. This quote was carved into a marble tablet at the entrance to the hall. However, now the Stalin quote is gone. It has been replaced by historical information about the station. Also, despite the fact, that Stalin’s quote was the main theme of the whole station design there is no portrait of him. Moreover, for a long time, none of the stations had portraits of him thanks to de-Stalinization, which came after Krushchev’s speech at the 20th Congress of the Communist Party of the Soviet Union.

All of Stalin’s portraits were painted over or destroyed. Two of the eight mosaics were completely replaced – mosaic Lenin speaks to the Red Army heading for the front was installed instead of the Guards Banner Presentations, the Triumph of the Victory mosaic appeared instead of the Victory Parade, and the medallion was replaced with the capture of the Reichstag mosaic.
