= Chaos. The Creation of the World =

1841 painting by Ivan Aivazovsky

- Хаос. Сотворение мира (Russian)
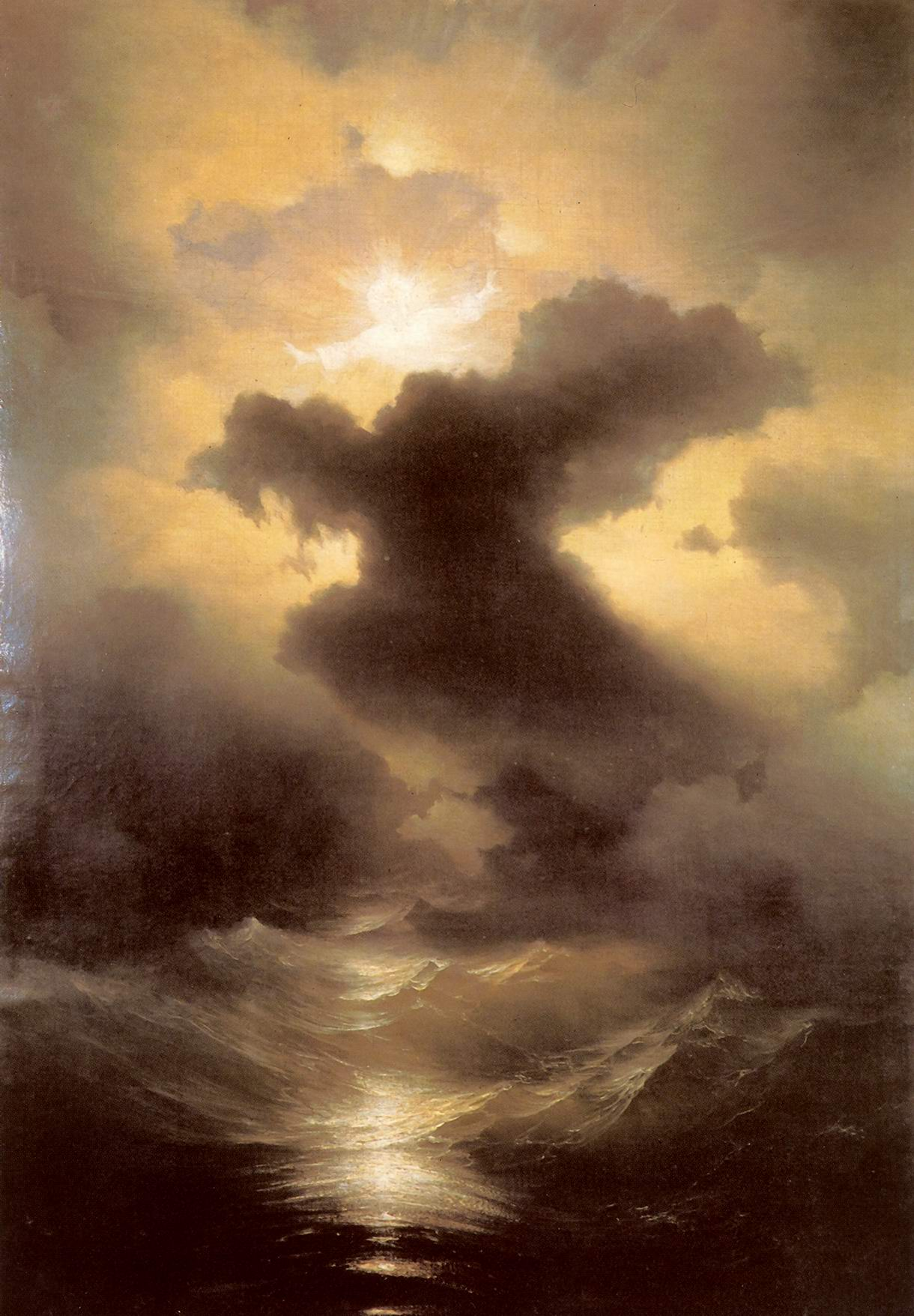
- Artist: Ivan Aivazovsky
- Year: 1841
- Medium: Oil-on-canvas
- Dimensions: 108 cm × 73 cm (43 in × 29 in)
- Location: San Lazzaro degli Armeni, Venice

Chaos. The Creation of the World (Russian: Хаос. Сотворение мира) is an oil-on-canvas seascape by the Russian Romantic painter Ivan Aivazovsky. He completed it in 1841, at the age of twenty-three, during the Italian leg of the travel stipend awarded to him by the Imperial Academy of Arts in Saint Petersburg. The picture shows the moment of biblical creation given in Genesis 1:1–3, with a humanoid figure of light rising from a torn storm-cloud above a heaving sea.

When Chaos was shown in Naples and Rome in 1841, the Italian press treated it as the sensation of the season. Pope Gregory XVI offered to buy it. Aivazovsky refused the fee and gave the canvas to the pope as a gift. In return he received a gold medal. Nikolai Gogol, whom Aivazovsky had befriended that winter in Rome, marked the news with a remark that became famous in Russian writing on the painter: "Glory to you, Vanya, a small man came from the banks of the Neva to Rome and at once raised chaos in the Vatican."

The painting hung in the Vatican Museums for some decades. At some point in the mid-nineteenth century, although the precise year is not recorded in any published source, it was transferred to the Mekhitarist Armenian Catholic monastery on the island of San Lazzaro degli Armeni in the Venetian Lagoon. Aivazovsky's elder brother Gabriel had taken vows there. The painting remains in the monastery's picture gallery to this day. Critics see Chaos as the first of Aivazovsky's biblical seascapes and as the work that brought him a European reputation while he was still a student abroad.

== Background ==
=== The Italian stipend ===
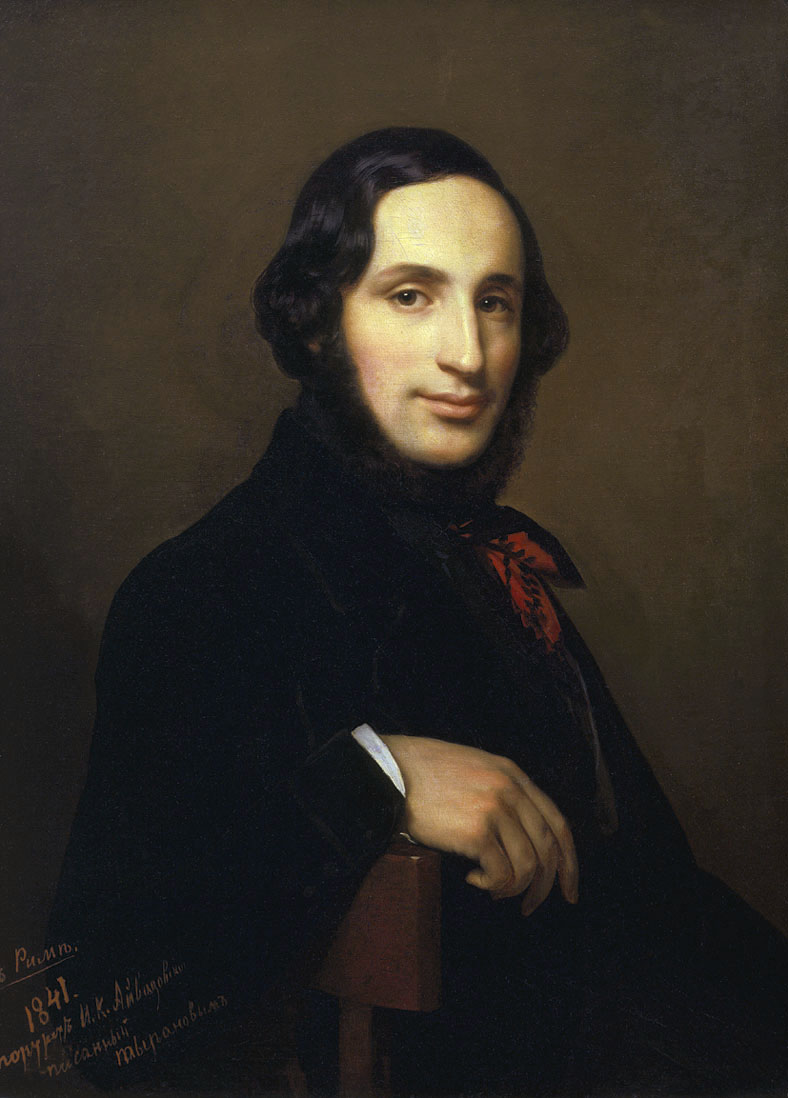
Aivazovsky in 1841, painted in Rome by Alexei Tyranov the same year Chaos was finished. The portrait is now in the Tretyakov Gallery in Moscow.

Aivazovsky left the Imperial Academy of Arts in 1837 with the Large Gold Medal for his seascapes, two years before the rest of his class. The medal entitled him to a state-funded study tour in Europe, but the Academy first sent him back to Crimea for two summers, where he painted Black Sea views and sailed with admirals Mikhail Lazarev, Vladimir Kornilov and Pavel Nakhimov during Russian fleet manoeuvres.

In July 1840 he finally set off, together with the genre painter Vasily Sternberg. They travelled overland through Berlin and Vienna and reached Venice at the end of August. Their first stop in the lagoon was the island monastery of San Lazzaro, where Aivazovsky was reunited with his elder brother Gabriel, an Armenian Catholic monk and orientalist who had joined the Mekhitarists ten years earlier. Aivazovsky stayed several weeks at the monastery, reading Armenian manuscripts and copying older masters. He then moved on through Florence, Sorrento and Amalfi and settled in Naples for the winter.

=== Friendship with Gogol ===
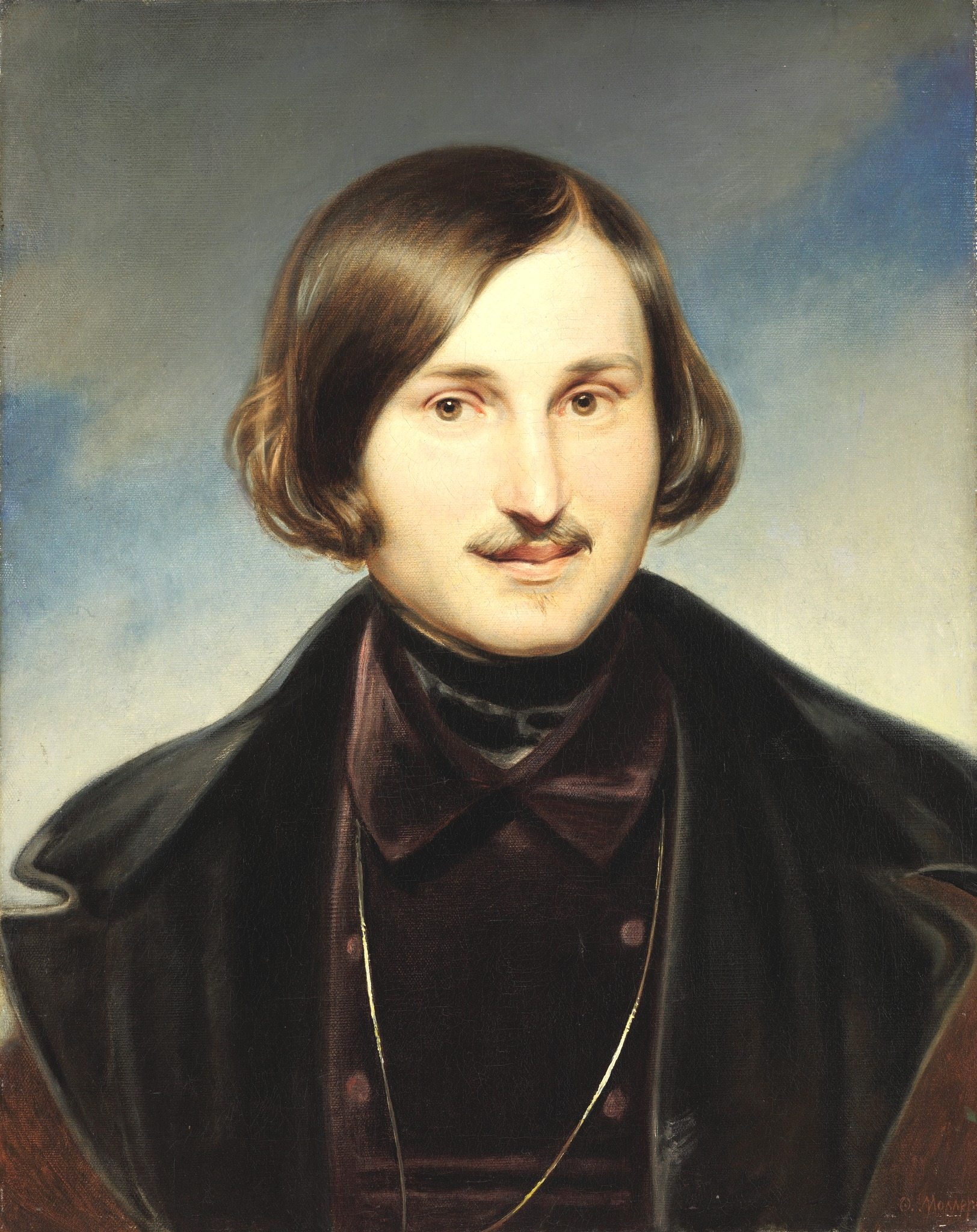
Nikolai Gogol in 1840, portrait by Otto Friedrich Theodor von Möller. Gogol befriended Aivazovsky in Rome that winter.

In Rome, late in 1840, Aivazovsky was drawn into the circle of Russian expatriates clustered around the painter Alexander Ivanov and the writer Nikolai Gogol. Gogol had been living in Rome on and off since 1837, then at work on the second volume of Dead Souls. He and Aivazovsky shared a southern provincial background (Gogol from Poltava, Aivazovsky from Feodosia) and became close quickly. They travelled together that spring through Tuscany and the Bay of Naples.

The historian Rosalind P. Blakesley places Aivazovsky's Roman years within the wider wave of Russian art-pensioners, including Ivanov, Karl Bryullov and Sylvester Shchedrin, whose Italian residences produced some of the most ambitious Russian Romantic painting of the 1830s and 1840s.

== Subject ==
Chaos takes its subject from the opening verses of the Book of Genesis:

"The earth was without form, and void, and darkness was upon the face of the deep. And the Spirit of God moved upon the face of the waters. And God said, Let there be light, and there was light."

— Genesis 1:2–3

Aivazovsky belonged to the Armenian Apostolic Church and was a regular reader of scripture. Chaos is normally treated as the first of his biblical seascapes, a sequence he would continue with The Creation of the World (1864, Russian Museum), The Deluge (1864, Russian Museum), Walking on Water (1888) and Descent of Noah from Mount Ararat (1889, National Gallery of Armenia).

The treatment is both cosmological and literal. The lower half of the canvas is given over to dark, heaving water, the "face of the deep", handled in the manner that had already become Aivazovsky's signature. The waves are high and translucent, the foam is picked out in cool grey-green, and the horizon is stretched almost to the picture's edges. The upper half is occupied by a torn mass of storm-cloud, and from its centre rises a luminous figure built entirely from light. According to the iconographical reading published by Bible.Gallery, the moment shown is not the appearance of the Sun or Moon (which Genesis assigns to the fourth day) but the primal "let there be light" of Genesis 1:3, with the light emanating from the Creator's own person before any of the celestial bodies has been formed.

== Composition and style ==
The canvas measures 108 by 73 cm. Some publications round these figures to 106 by 75 cm. It is signed at the lower right and is unusual in Aivazovsky's output for being noticeably taller than wide. Most of his marines are landscape-format pictures that emphasise the sweep of the horizon. The vertical orientation here reinforces the cosmological reading, stacking sea, atmosphere and divinity along a single rising axis.

The colour scheme is restricted. The sea is laid in with deep blue-greens and silvery whites. The cloud mass takes a wider tonal range, running from leaden grey at the edges to a hot ochre-gold around the figure's silhouette. There is no foreground vessel, no horizon traffic, and no human figure other than the divinity, a choice that is striking for a Romantic seascape of the period but consistent with the Genesis subject, which is set before either ships or people exist.

The painting sits at the meeting point of two traditions that Aivazovsky had absorbed during his training. From his Academy teacher Maxim Vorobyov (and through him from Claude Lorrain and the veduta painters of Naples) he inherited a habit of carefully gradated atmospheric perspective. From Karl Bryullov, whose The Last Day of Pompeii (1833) had been the great public success of his student years, he took the willingness to combine a real meteorological event, a storm, with an unambiguously supernatural protagonist. Twenty-first-century critics have linked the vertical-light composition to the Romantic sublime of Caspar David Friedrich and J. M. W. Turner, although there is no documentary evidence that Aivazovsky had seen work by either painter before 1841.

== Reception ==
=== Italian press ===
Chaos was first shown in Naples in the spring of 1841 and then in Rome later that year, hung alongside two earlier works of the same Italian period, The Bay of Naples on a Moonlit Night and The Storm. The Roman Art Gazette (Giornale dell'arte) gave the young Russian an unusually long notice:

Aivazovsky's pictures in Rome are judged the best in the exhibition. Neapolitan Night, The Storm and Chaos have caused such a sensation in the capital of the fine arts that the palaces of noblemen and society venues are all astir with the fame of the landscape painter from southern Russia… Pope Gregory XVI has purchased his picture Chaos and had it hung in the Vatican, where only the pictures of the world's greatest artists are considered worthy of a place. His Chaos is generally held to be quite unlike anything seen before. It is said to be a miracle of artistry.

— Art Gazette, Rome, 1841

The notice was reprinted in part by the Saint Petersburg Khudozhestvennaya Gazeta the following year, and is the source most often quoted in Russian biographies for the painting's contemporary success.

=== Pope Gregory XVI ===
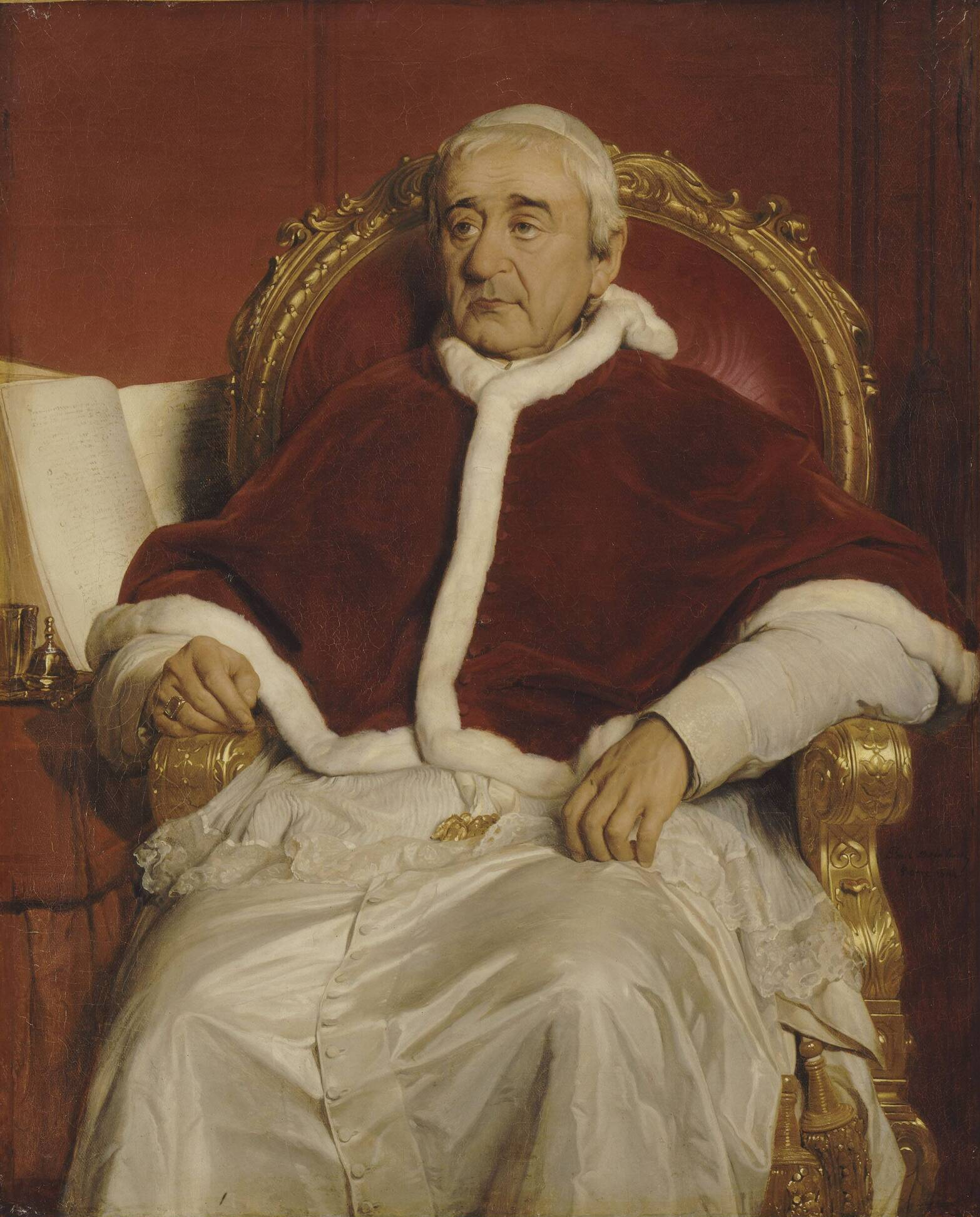
Pope Gregory XVI in an 1844 portrait by Paul Delaroche, painted three years after he acquired Chaos for the Vatican.

Russian biographies, starting with N. P. Sobko's Dictionary of Russian Artists of 1893 and developed by the Soviet curator Nikolai Barsamov, describe a series of visits to Aivazovsky's Roman studio by prelates and cardinals sent by Pope Gregory XVI to inspect the canvas before its acquisition. None of these visitors are recorded as finding doctrinal grounds for rejection, and the pope, a patron of the arts who had founded the Vatican Egyptian Museum in 1839, agreed to take Chaos for the Vatican collection.

Several Russian biographies note that Aivazovsky was the only Russian artist of the nineteenth century to receive a Vatican gold medal.

A later piece of folklore, repeated by the Russian art portal ilovevaquero and traceable to Barsamov, says that after the painting was hung certain Roman cardinals raised objections to the silhouette of the figure of light, claiming that the dark cloud-shapes around it could be read as a demonic profile. The story is presented as studio gossip rather than as documented fact, and no Vatican archival reference for any such dispute has been published.

=== Gogol's joke ===
News of the papal medal reached the Russian colony in Rome in the spring of 1842. The reaction of Nikolai Gogol, preserved by his first biographer Pavel Annenkov, has since become one of the most often quoted anecdotes in Russian writing on Aivazovsky:

Исполать тебе, Ваня! Пришел ты, маленький человек, с берегов далекой Невы в Рим и сразу поднял хаос в Ватикане!

— loosely, "Glory to you, Vanya! A small man came from the banks of the far-off Neva to Rome and at once raised chaos in the Vatican!"

The joke turns on the title of the painting and on the figure of the "small man" (malenkii chelovek), a type of Russian Romantic prose that Gogol had himself helped to invent in The Overcoat.

== Provenance ==
The early provenance is well documented. Aivazovsky gave the painting to Gregory XVI in 1841, and it hung in the Vatican Museums thereafter. The date of its transfer to the Mekhitarist congregation on San Lazzaro degli Armeni is less clearly recorded. The Mekhitarist congregation itself dates the gift to the middle of the nineteenth century and ascribes it to the lasting connection between Aivazovsky and his brother Gabriel, who had been a monk there and who, between 1843 and 1848, edited the order's journal Bazmavep.

The painting hangs today in the picture gallery of the Mekhitarist monastery on San Lazzaro degli Armeni in the Venetian Lagoon, where it is displayed alongside other works given to the order by members of the Armenian diaspora.

== Later versions and reworkings ==
The success of Chaos encouraged Aivazovsky to return to the Genesis subject on at least two further occasions.

- Creation of the World (also catalogued as The Moment of the Creation of the World or Mirozdanie, 1864) is a much larger oil on canvas, 195 by 236 cm, that the artist completed in a single nine-hour session. It was shown at the Imperial Academy of Arts in 1864 and bought by Emperor Alexander II in 1865 for the Hermitage Museum. The canvas is now in the Russian Museum in Saint Petersburg.
- Creation of the World (1889) is a smaller late version painted at the artist's home in Feodosia. It is held in the Aivazovsky National Art Gallery.

Both later canvases reuse the vertical-light composition of 1841. In keeping with Aivazovsky's late style, however, they replace the high-contrast Romantic palette with a softer, more silvery tonality.

== Critical assessment ==
The major Russian-language monographs on Aivazovsky, by Nikolai Barsamov, Shahen Khachatrian and the bilingual catalogue assembled by Gianni Caffiero and Ivan Samarine, all treat Chaos as the breakthrough of the Italian period. It was the work that turned the prodigy of the Academy into a painter with an international audience. Barsamov noted in 1962 that no other picture had carried Aivazovsky's name so quickly through the European press, and that 1841 was also the year in which the artist abandoned the Italian-language spelling Gaivazovskij for the form he would use for the rest of his life.

Gianni Caffiero, writing in the English-language catalogue Seas, Cities and Dreams (2000), is more measured. The lower half of the painting, he writes, shows "early signs of Aivazovsky's extraordinary technical competence in painting stormy seas", while the upper half "suggests a painter still trying to decide what to do with that competence, with his own God-like command of his materials, and whether his attachment to Romanticism required a glorification of something more than nature's own powers". The British critic Alexander Adams has described the canvas as "ambitious, theatrical and a little awkward, the first time Aivazovsky tries to put a metaphysics on top of a marine, and the moment at which his marines start to mean more than they show".

In the wider history of Russian biblical painting, Chaos is read alongside Alexander Ivanov's The Appearance of Christ Before the People (begun 1837) as a sign that the Italian colony of Russian painters was willing to attempt Old Testament subjects that had largely been the preserve of Italian Renaissance masters.

== See also ==
- Ivan Aivazovsky
- Marine art
- Russian Romanticism
- The Ninth Wave
