= Kholuy miniature =

Russian folk handicraft

Coordinates: 56°43′36″N 41°52′29″E

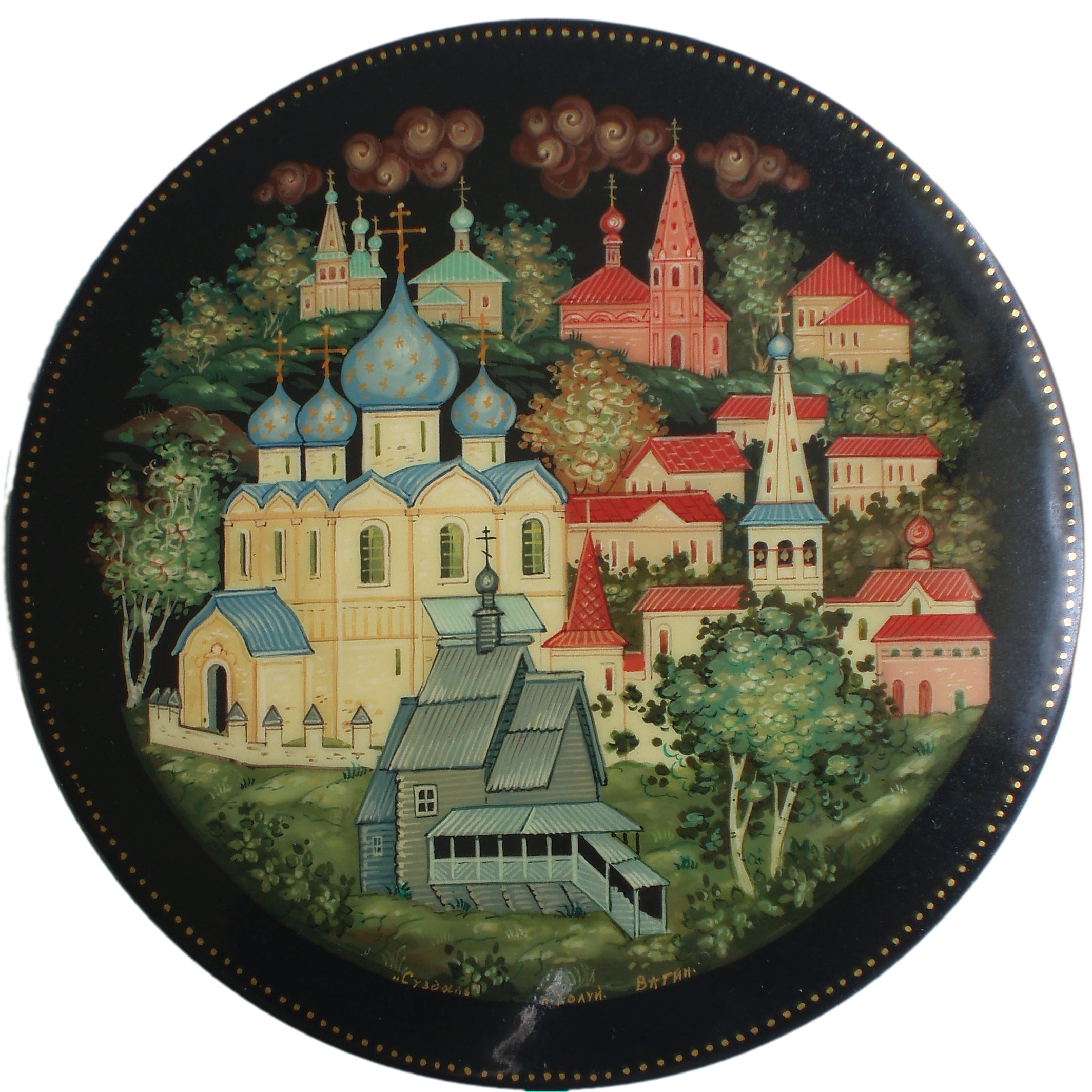
A Kholuy miniature box depicting the town of Suzdal

A Kholuy miniature is a Russian folk handicraft of miniature painting, made with tempera on a varnished box of papier-mâché. This form of Russian lacquer art is produced exclusively by students of the Kholuy school.

The Kholuy school of icon painting was founded in 1883. The school continued the local handicraft of icon painting known since the 16th century, but after the Russian Revolution the icon painting workshops were closed. In the 1930s, a group of artists formed an association to open a workshop for miniature lacquer art, and a new school was opened in 1943. Subjects for Kholuy miniatures vary from Russian fairy tales (e.g. Snowmaiden) to cities.

Kholuy miniatures seem to be less bounded by tradition than the boxes from Palekh, Fedoskino and Mstyora. Unlike Palekh artists, Kholuy artists emphasize the tonal composition of landscapes. Their color palette predominantly features yellow, orange, red, brown, and rich shades of blue and green. Contrasting combinations of warm and cool tones are a characteristic feature of Kholuy lacquer painting.
