= Russian lacquer art =

Art of making papier-mâché items, lacquered and hand-painted in Russia

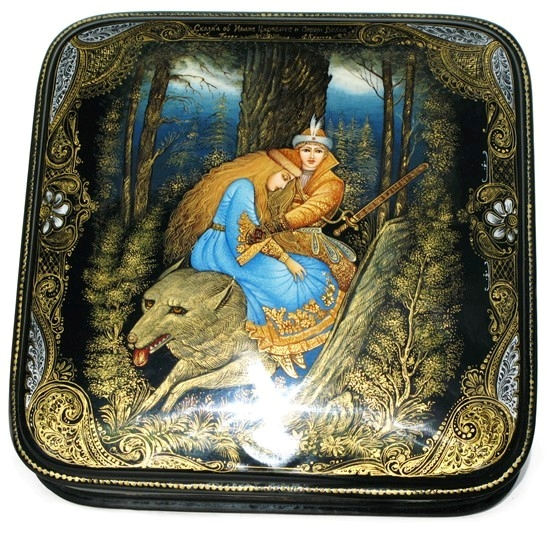
A Palekh jewelry box depicting a scene from the fairy tale Tsarevitch Ivan, the Fire Bird and the Gray Wolf

Russian lacquer art developed from the art of icon painting, which came to an end with the collapse of Imperial Russia. The icon painters, who previously had been employed by supplying not only churches but people's homes, needed a way to make a living. Thus, the craft of making papier-mâché decorative boxes and panels developed, the items were lacquered and then hand painted by the artists, often with scenes from folk tales.

== Background ==
Lacquer art rose in popularity during the eighteenth century. Artists were inspired by Western European countries use of lacquers, and artisans were invited to Russia to help train Russian apprentices. Initially, Russian lacquer designs were closely related to their European and East Asian inspirations. But during the nineteenth century lacquer artists began painting idealized scenes of the country and peasant life, as well as representations of Russian folk tales.

== The four centers of Russian lacquer art ==
The village of Fedoskino (Федоскино), located not far from Moscow on the banks of the Ucha River, is the oldest of the four art centers of Russian lacquer miniature painting on papier-mâché, which has been practiced there since 1795. It stands apart both geographically, and in that oil paints are used rather than egg tempera. While allowing the artist a free hand in impressionistic interpretation, the style of Fedoskino painting is largely realistic in composition and detail.

The other three Russian lacquer art centers are:

- Palekh (Палех)
- Kholuy (Kholui, Kholuj, Holui - Холуй)
- Mstyora (Mstera - Мстёра)

The lacquer artists of Palekh, Kholuy and Mstyora continue to use the technique of painting in egg-based tempera overlaid with intricate gold leaf highlighting.

All three are situated in the former Vladimir-Suzdal Principality, Ivanovo region of central Russia, and are deeply rooted in the 17th-19th century icon painting tradition, which lasted until the Russian Revolution of 1917, and is now being revived by young artists of the 21st century.

== Gallery ==
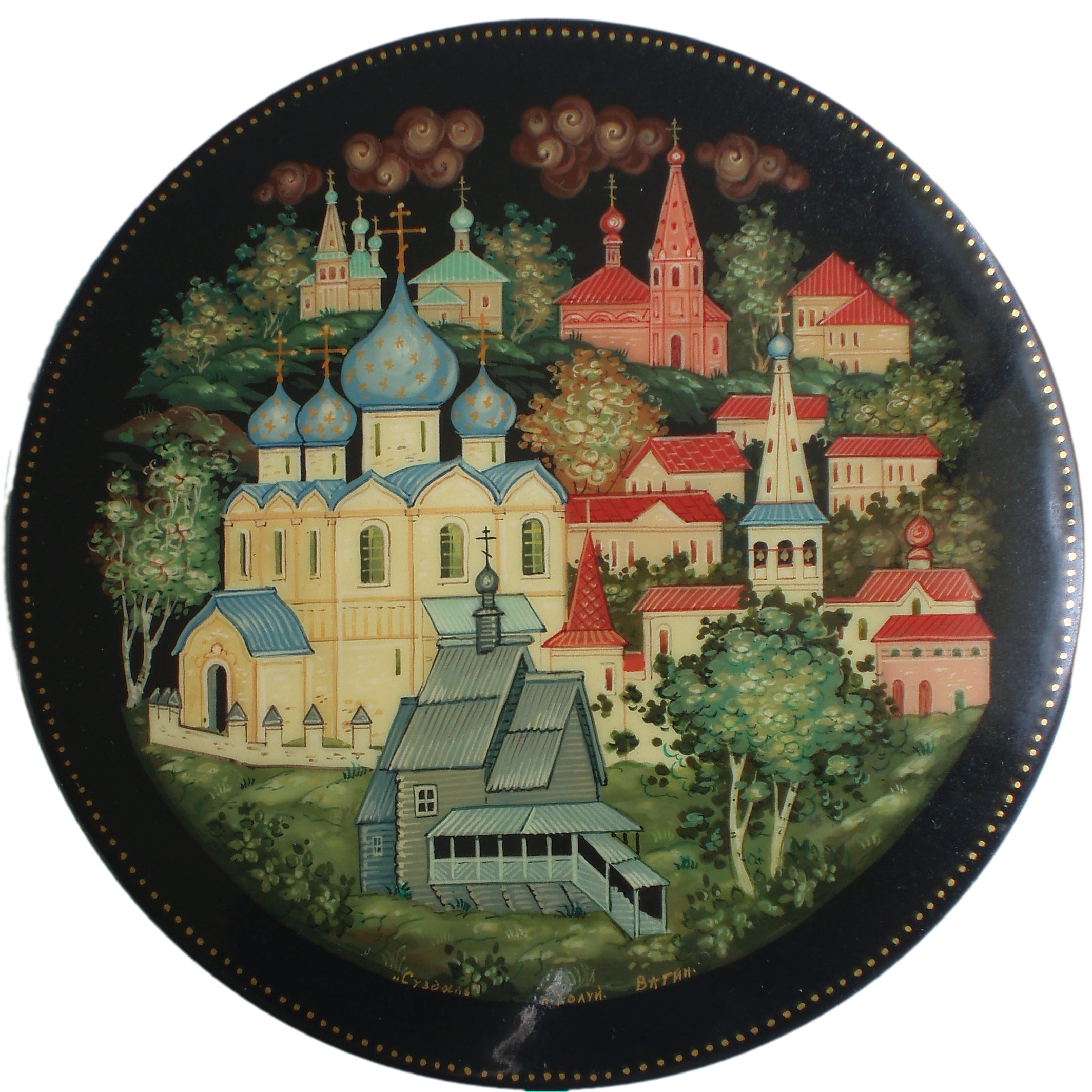
Kholuy miniature jewelry box:
townscape of Suzdal.

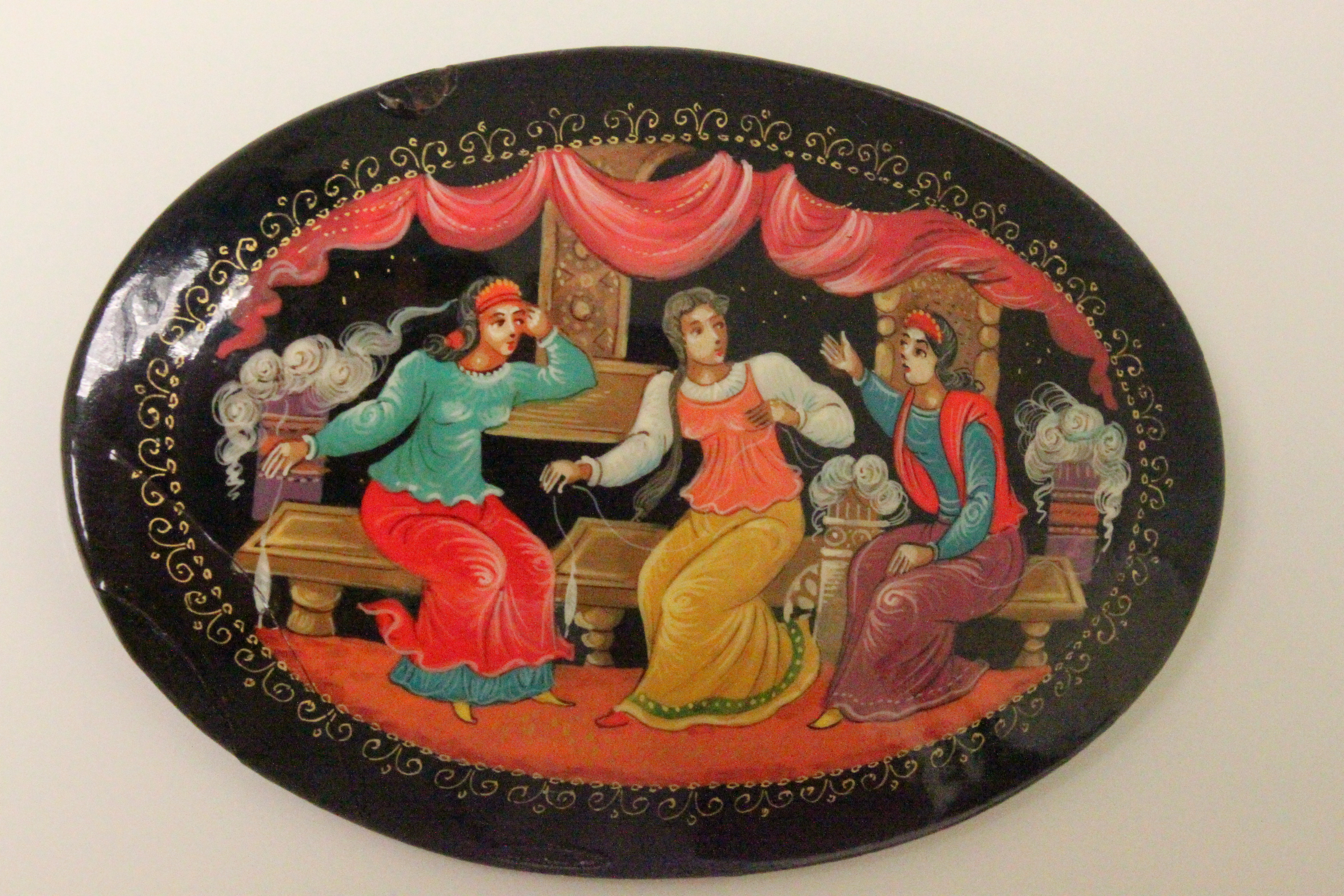
Mstyora miniature brooch:
scene from The Tale of Tsar Saltan

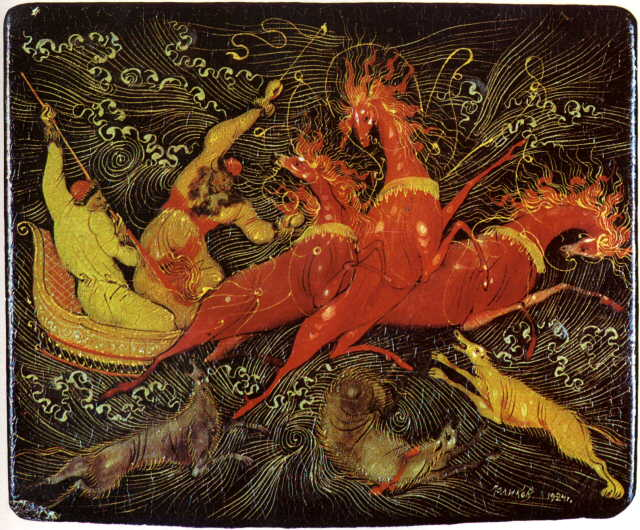
Palekh miniature cigarette case:
a troika beset by wolves.

== See also ==
- Palekh miniature
- Khokhloma
