= Mstyora =

Mstyora may refer to:

- Mstyora (inhabited locality), name of several inhabited localities in Russia
- Mstyora railway station, a railway station in Vladimir Oblast, Russia
- Lake Mstyora, a lake in Vladimir Oblast, Russia
- Mstyora River, a river in Vladimir Oblast, Russia
