= Mstyora (rural locality) =

Rural locality in Vyaznikovsky District of Vladimir Oblast, Russia

Coordinates: 56°15′51″N 41°51′59″E

Mstyora (Russian: Мстёра) is a rural locality (a station) in Vyaznikovsky District of Vladimir Oblast, Russia, 13 kilometers (8.1 mi) south of an urban locality of the same name (Mstyora). Municipally, it is a part of Mstyora Urban Settlement, of which the other Mstyora is the administrative center.

Mstyora railway station is in this rural locality.

== See also ==
- Mstyora miniature
