= Mstyora (inhabited locality) =

Mstyora (Russian: Мстёра) is the name of several inhabited localities in Vyaznikovsky District of Vladimir Oblast, Russia.

Urban localities

- Mstyora (urban locality), a settlement

Rural localities

- Mstyora (rural locality), a station
