= Mstyora (urban locality) =

Urban locality in Vladimir Oblast, Russia

Coordinates: 56°22′39″N 41°55′48″E

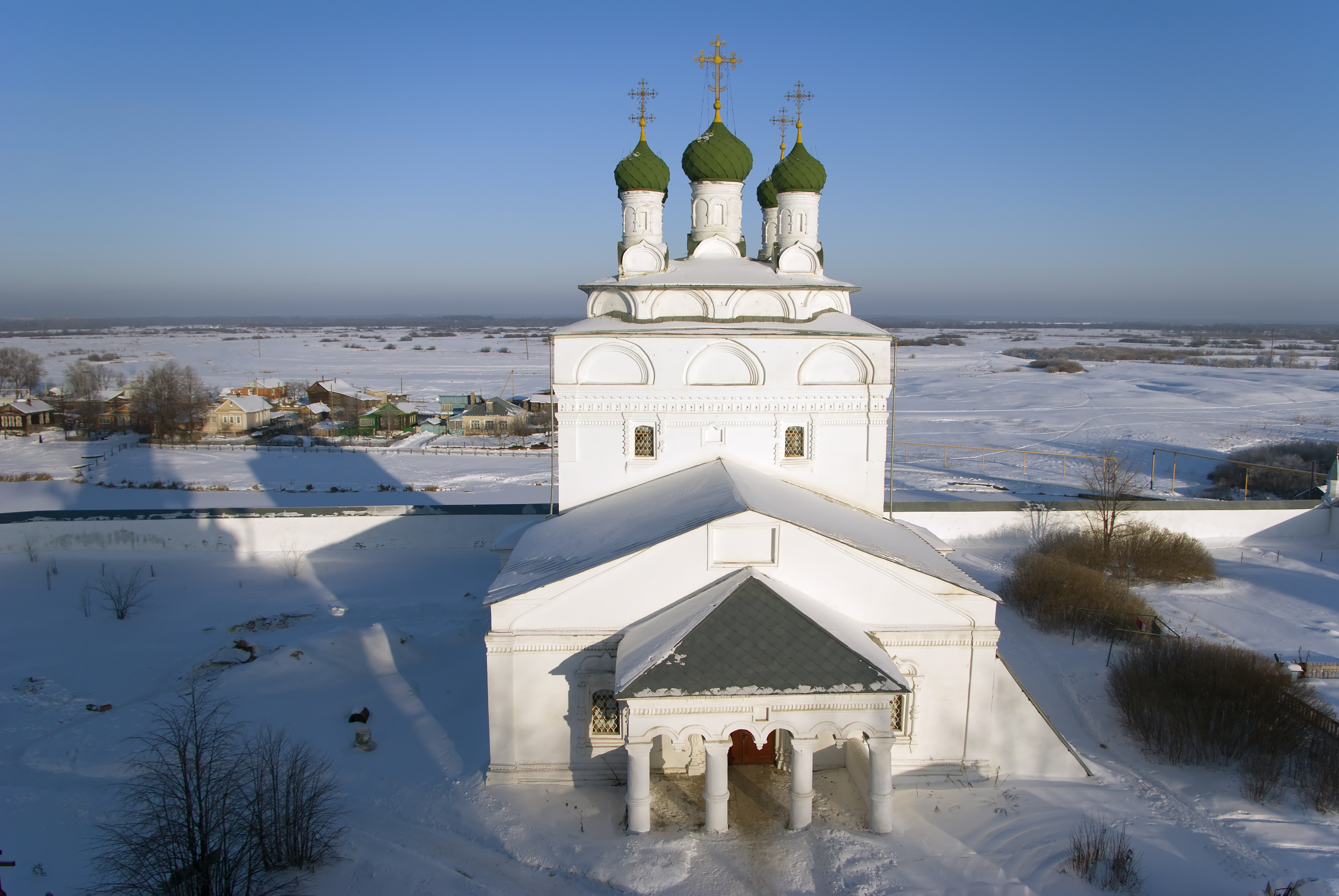
Bogoyavlensky Monastery in Mstyora

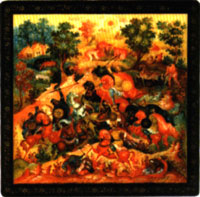
Mstyora miniature

Mstyora or Mstera (Russian: Мстёра) is an urban locality (a settlement) in Vyaznikovsky District of Vladimir Oblast, Russia. Municipally, it is a part of Mstyora Urban Settlement, of which it is the administrative center. Population: 4,517 (2021 census); 4,859 (2010 census); 5,598 (2002 census); 6,307 (1989 Soviet census).

== History ==
It grew up as a settlement attached to the nearby monastery of the Epiphany (Богоявленский монастырь), on land belonging to the Romodanovskys, in the early 17th century. After the abolition of the monastery in 1764, it became a village, named after the Mstyora River (then known as Mstyorka); the name is probably from Merya Mustajarvi (compare Finnish musta, meaning "black", and järvi, meaning "lake"). Like the nearby villages of Kholuy and Palekh, it was a center of icon production in the traditional style, but in contrast to the opulence of Palekh icons, those of Mstyora "sought to emulate the fifteenth and sixteenth century austerity" and "were greatly favored by Russia's Old Believers' sect."

By the beginning of the 18th century, it became an important trading post, with 182 houses and 57 shops; during the 19th century lithographed lubok prints were produced in large numbers until competition from book publishers in Moscow and St. Petersburg proved too great. The 19th century also saw the development of textiles, market gardening, boat building, carpentry, and other industries. "By 1897 Mstyora was a town with over four thousand inhabitants, and the site of periodic fairs at which books and prints were sold. 'The inhabitants of Mstyora are only peasants in name,' wrote [Alexander] Prugavin. 'In essence these are real city folk.'"

Meanwhile, Mstyora's icon makers had turned to the restoration and imitation of icons in all styles, which led to fakery as well; V. N. Ovchinnikov, an icon painter himself, observed: "Mstyora craftsmen were so good at copying old icons, that quite often, the dating of a newly painted one would baffle the expert." After the October Revolution, "Mstyora craftsmen switched to making painted, turned wooden toys and the painting of oilcloth, kerchiefs, tea caddies, and sugar bowls"; eventually they turned to the production of the miniatures for which Mstyora has become famous.

In 1863, Mstyora was administratively a part of Bogoyavlenskaya Volost of Vyaznikovsky Uyezd. At that time, its population comprised 2,615 inhabitants (1,205 male and 1,410 female) living in 307 homesteads. At that time, there were three Russian Orthodox Churches, one Edinoverie church, two colleges, an almshouse, a lithography shop, a market, a pier, and three factories in Mstyora.

Urban-type settlement status was granted to Mstyora in 1935.
