= The Ninth Wave =

1850 painting by Ivan Aïvazovsky

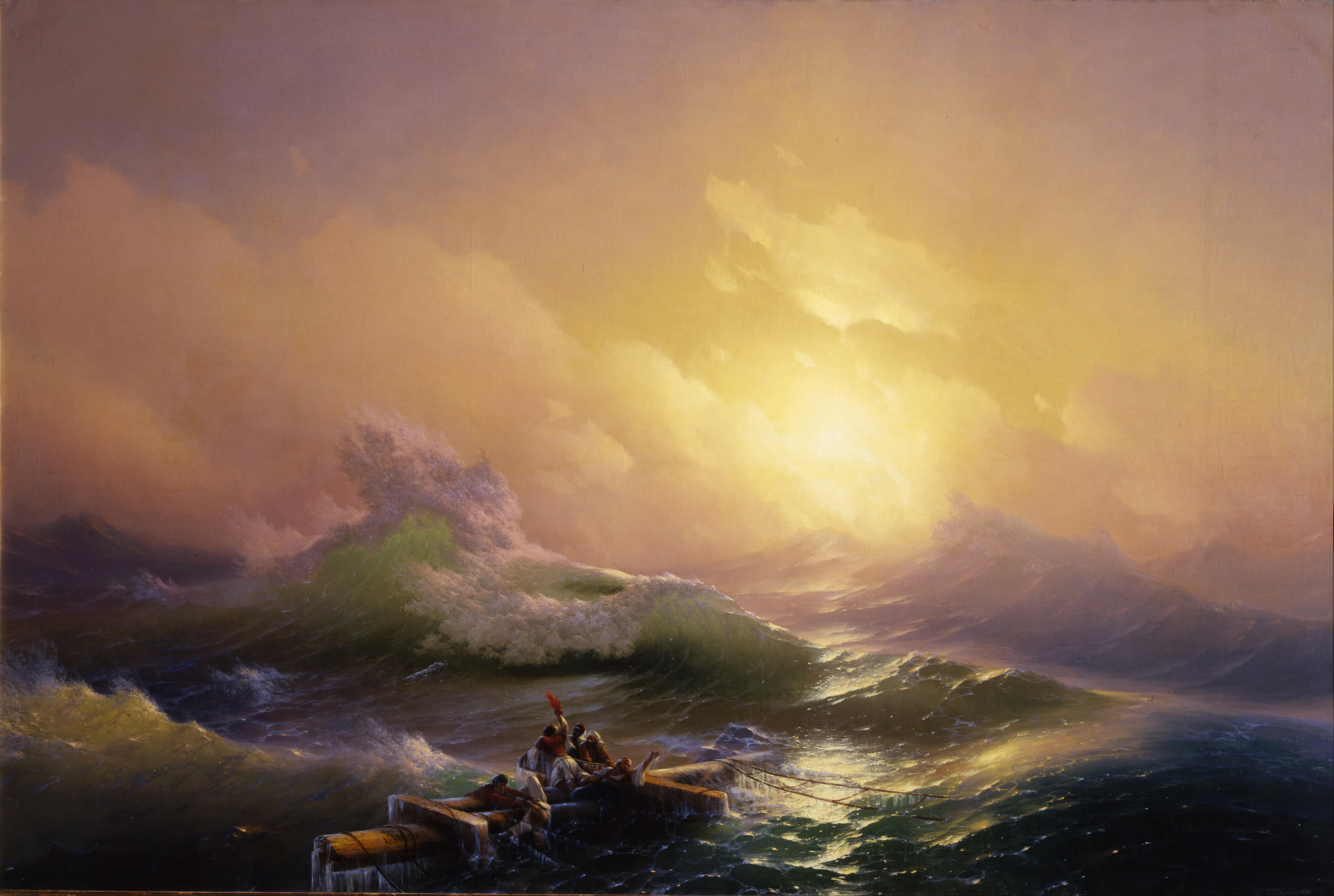
- Artist: Ivan Aivazovsky
- Year: 1850
- Medium: Oil-on-canvas
- Dimensions: 221 cm × 332 cm (87 in × 131 in)
- Location: State Russian Museum, St. Petersburg

The Ninth Wave (Russian: Девятый вал, Dyevyatiy val) is an 1850 painting by Russian marine painter Ivan Aivazovsky. It is his best-known work.

The title refers to an old sailing expression referring to a wave of incredible size that comes after a succession of incrementally larger waves.

It depicts a sea after a night storm and people facing death attempting to save themselves by clinging to debris from a wrecked ship. The debris, in the shape of the cross, appears to be a Christian metaphor for salvation from earthly sin. The painting has warm tones, which reduce the sea's apparent menacing overtones, and a chance for the people to survive seems plausible. This painting shows both the violence and beauty of nature.

== Background ==
Ivan Aivazovsky (1817–1900) was born in Feodosia, Crimea to an Armenian father.

== Technique ==
Aivazovsky conjured the ocean's magnitude by saturating a vast canvas with color and light.

== Legacy ==
The Ninth Wave is Aivazovsky's most famous work.
