= The Appearance of Christ Before the People =

1857 painting by Alexander Andreyevich Ivanov

- Artist: Alexander Andreyevich Ivanov
- Year: 1837–1857
- Medium: Oil on canvas
- Dimensions: 540 cm × 750 cm (210 in × 300 in)
- Location: Tretyakov Gallery, Moscow, Russia

The Appearance of Christ Before the People (Russian: Явление Христа народу Yavleniye Khrista narodu) or The Apparition of the Messiah is an oil painting on canvas, measuring 540 cm × 750 cm, by the Russian painter Alexander Andreyevich Ivanov (1806–1858).

The painting has been called his magnum opus and took twenty years to complete (1837–1857). The narrative of the painting is based on the first chapter of the Gospel according to John.

== Artist ==
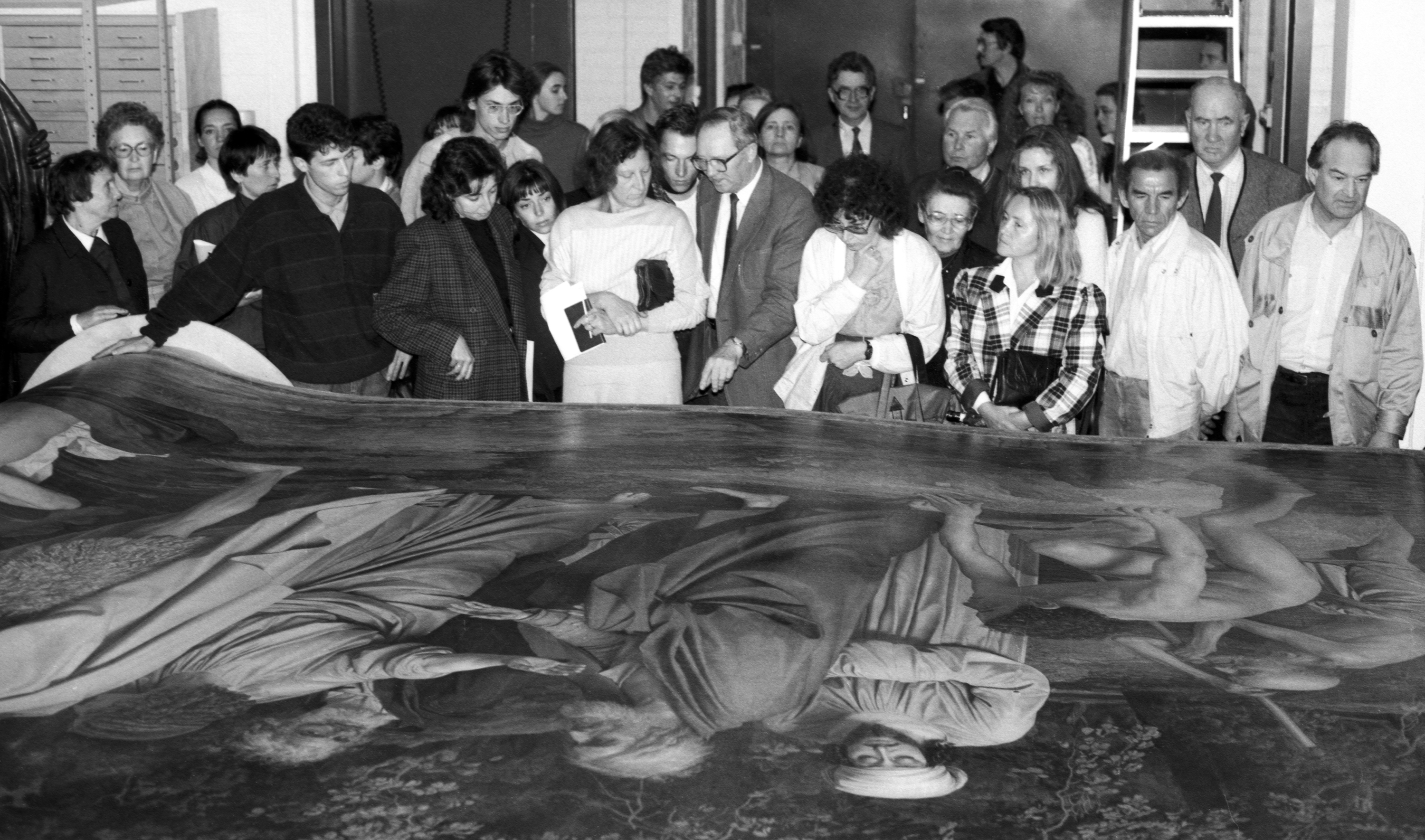
Yuri Korolev, Director of the Tretyakov Gallery, presents a painting in storage during the reconstruction of the gallery's main building, August 1991

Alexander Ivanov was born on 28 July 1806 to a family of artists. He was only eleven years old when he entered as a student in the Imperial Academy of Arts, where he studied under the guidance of his father, Andrei Ivanovich Ivanov, a professor of painting. Ivanov was awarded two silver medals and in 1824 received a gold medal.

== Painting ==
The painting alludes to several stories in the Bible. In the center of the painting John the Baptist, wearing an animal skin, is standing on the banks of the River Jordan. He points towards the figure of Jesus in the distance, approaching the scene. To the left stands the young John the Apostle, behind him St. Peter, and further on Andrew the Apostle and Nathanael. In the foreground are people who watch the scene unfold but are undecided what to do, both young and old men. In the center there is a wealthy man who was too rich to follow Christ and a slave, about whom Ivanov remarked that he meant to depict people who experienced, after a life in despair and suffering, "joy for the first time". To the right there is a figure, that stands nearest to Jesus, who was depicted as the painter's good friend, the writer Gogol. Before the wanderer with a staff seated not far from John, is a figure seated with a red headgear. The figure is a self-portrait; the artist has captured his own features on the canvas.

Studies

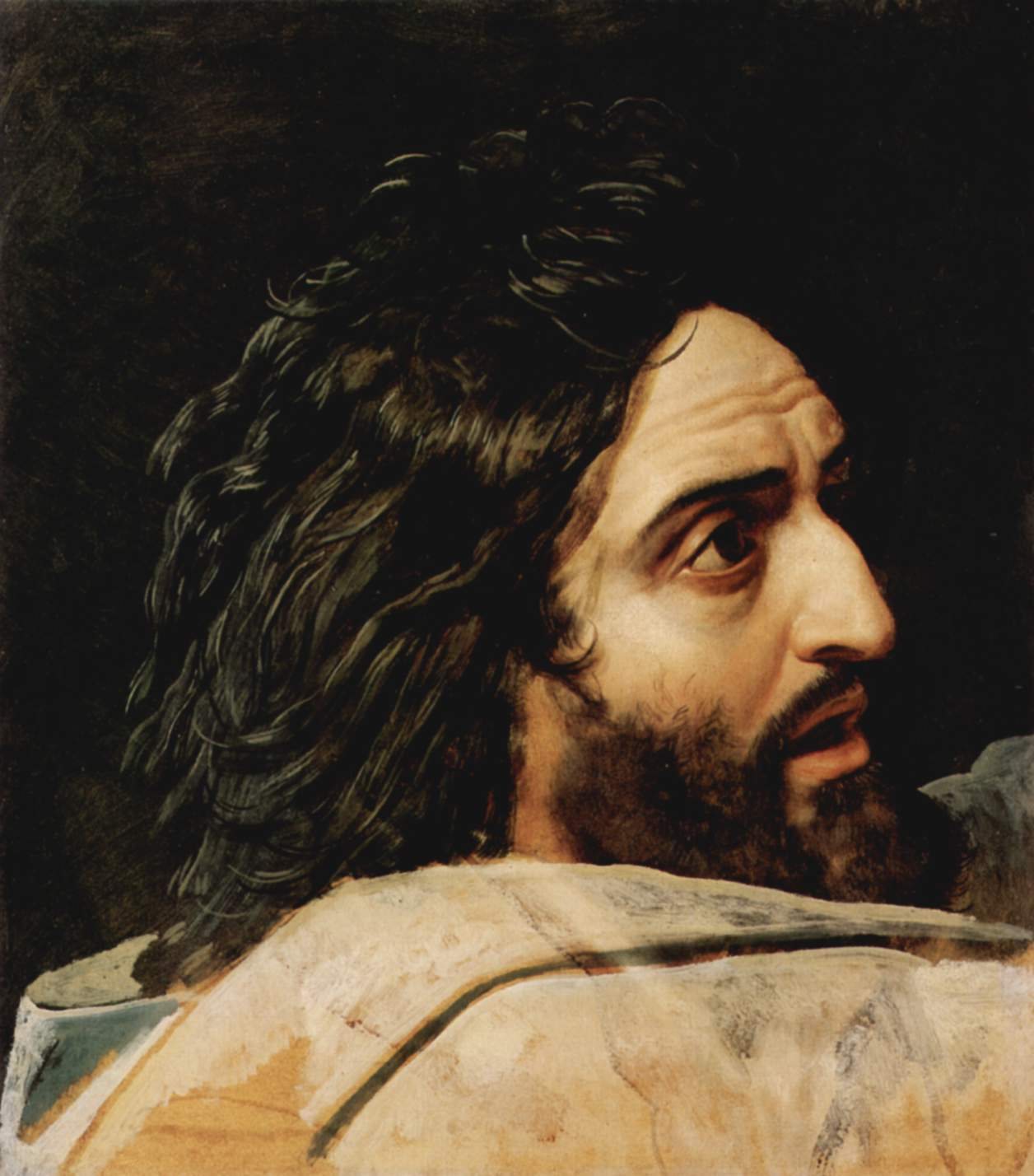
Study of the head of John the Baptist

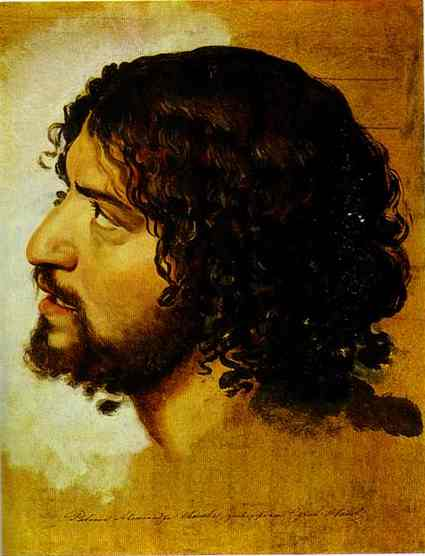
Head of a man

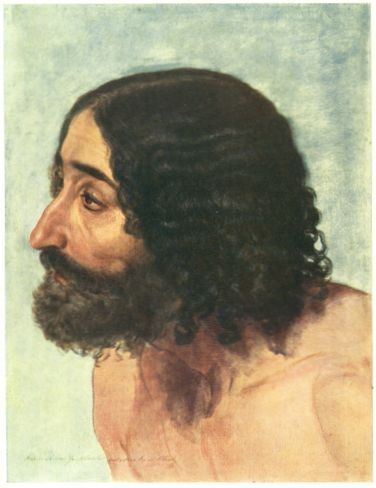
Initial first sketches
