= Kholuy, Ivanovo Oblast =

Kholuy Холуй
- Selo
- Interactive map of Kholuy
- Location of Kholuy Kholuy (Ivanovo Oblast)
- Coordinates: 56°34′32″N 41°52′27″E
- Country: Russia
- Federal subject: Ivanovo Oblast
- Administrative district: Yuzhsky District
- Founded: 1546

Population
  - Estimate (2002): 1,031 )
- Time zone: UTC+3 (MSK)
- Postal code: 155633
- OKTMO ID: 24635406101

Kholuy (Russian: Хо́луй) is a rural locality (a selo) in Yuzhsky District of Ivanovo Oblast, Russia, situated southwest of Puchezh 71 kilometers (44 mi) from the Shuya railway station. Population: 1,031 (2002 census); 1,299 (1989 Soviet census).

== Geography and economy ==
Kholuy is located on the banks of the Teza River, a tributary of the Klyazma River. Its economy is based on textile production, sewing, forestry, woodworking, baked goods, agriculture, and artistic handicrafts. Kholuy's area of specialty in the artistic sphere revolves around the painting of lacquered boxes, made from papier mache (Kholuy miniature).

== History ==
Kholuy had urban-type settlement status until 2004, when it was demoted to a rural locality.

== Icon painting ==
A Russian legend claims that it was a home to icon-painters even before the Mongol invasions. At least since the 17th century, Kholuy has been a producer of lacquer boxes, plates, and other painted items that this region of Russia is famous for. After the October Revolution, icon-painting became unpopular and even dangerous. However, Kholuy painters kept painting, at this time in secrecy, giving the area a kind of legitimacy in the cultural and artistic world.

The style of icon painting in Kholuy is particular to this town, and distinctly different from the more widely known Palekh style of painting. The icon-painters in Kholuy use a large amount of green hues, as opposed to the style of using mostly red colors, as is traditional in Palekh.
