= Kachalov =

Kachalov (Russian: Качалов) is a Russian masculine surname originating from the Russian slang word kachala, which referred to a drunkard or a reveler; its feminine counterpart is Kachalova. It may refer to the following notable people:

- Vasily Kachalov (1875–1948), Russian actor
- Vladimir Kachalov (1890–1941), Soviet general
- Yulia Kachalova (born 1989), Russian sprint canoeist
