= Mstyora miniature =

Russian folk handicraft style of miniature painting

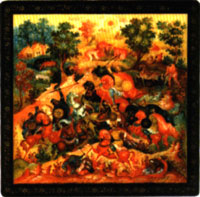
Example of a miniature

Mstyora (or Mstera) miniature (Russian: Мстёрская миниатюра) is a Russian folk handicraft of miniature painting, which is done with tempera paints on varnished articles mostly made of papier-mâché.

Mstyora miniatures appeared in the settlement of Mstyora (in modern Vladimir Oblast) in the early 20th century on the basis of a local tradition of icon-painting. In 1923, Mstyora painters formed an artel called Ancient Russian Folk Painting (Древнерусская народная живопись), renamed Proletarian Art (Пролетарское искусство) in 1931. This artel was turned into a factory in 1960. The Mstyora painting technology was borrowed from the Palekh artists.

Mstyora miniatures usually represent characters from real life, folklore, and literary and historical works. Warmth and gentleness of colors, depth of landscape backgrounds (often with blue dales in the back), small size and squatness of human figurines, and subtlety of framing pattern done in gold are typical.

Mstyora miniature painting, rooted in a local icon-painting tradition, emerged in the early 20th century in Mstyora, now in Vladimir Oblast, Russia. In 1923, artisans formed the Ancient Russian Folk Painting artel, later renamed Proletarian Art in 1931 and transformed into a factory in 1960. Inspired by Palekh artists, Mstyora miniatures, crafted on varnished papier-mâché, depict scenes from real life, folklore, literature, and history, featuring warm colors, intricate gold-framed patterns, and distinctive landscape backgrounds with characteristic blue dales in the distance.

== Sources ==
- Русское народное прикладное искусство (in Russian). Русский Язык. 1990. pp. 233–237. ISBN 9785200010097.
