= Alexander Andreyevich Ivanov =

Russian painter (1806–1858)

- Александр Андреевич Иванов
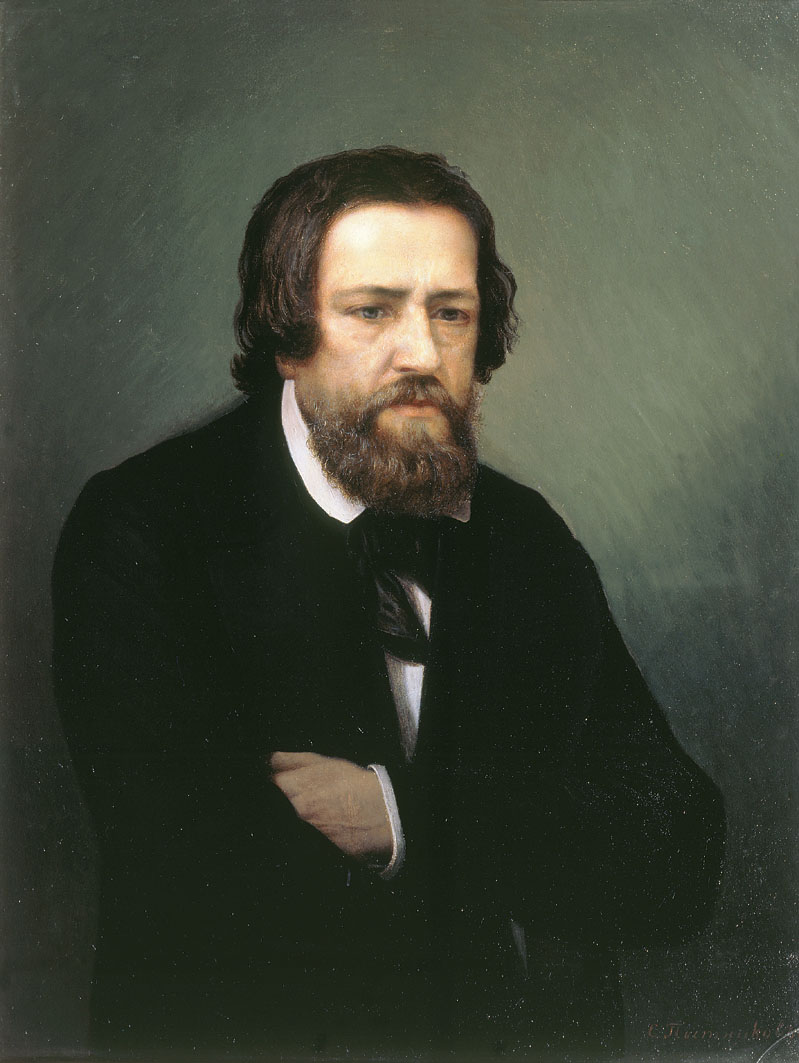
- Posthumous portrait by Sergey Postnikov, c. 1873, oils, after the 1846 daguerreotype by unknown Roman master; Tretyakov Gallery, Moscow
- Born: July 16, 1806; St. Petersburg, Russian Empire
- Died: July 3, 1858 (aged 51); St. Petersburg, Russian Empire
- Resting place: Tikhvin Cemetery, St. Petersburg
- Education: Imperial Academy of Arts (1827)
- Known for: History painting
- Awards: Big Gold Medal of the Imperial Academy of Arts (1827)
- Elected: Member Academy of Arts (1836)

Alexander Andreyevich Ivanov (Russian: Алекса́ндр Андре́евич Ива́нов; 28 July [O.S. 16 July] 1806 – 15 July [O.S. 3 July] 1858) was a Russian painter who adhered to the waning tradition of Neoclassicism but found little sympathy with his contemporaries. Although Ivanov was born and died in St. Petersburg, he spent the most of his life in Rome, where he worked on his magnum opus, The Appearance of Christ Before the People.

== Biography ==
=== Early years and education ===
Alexander Andreyevich was born to an art professor Andrey Ivanov. Aged 11, he entered the Imperial Academy of Arts and studied at his father's course together with Karl Briullov. For his good achievements he was awarded with two silver medals, in 1824 he received a golden medal for the painting 'Priam Asking Achilles to Return Hector's Body'. In 1827 he was honoured with the Big Gold Medal of the Imperial Academy of Arts for 'Joseph interprets the butler's and the baker's dreams' and was promoted to the XIV grade artists.

Ivanov's benefactors decided to send him abroad to study art, but required one more picture, thus he creates 'Bellerophon sent to a campaign against the Chimera'. In 1830 Ivanov departs to Europe, first in Germany, then to Italy.

=== Italian years ===
Ivanov's first works in Rome were copies of The Creation of Adam of the Sistine Chapel and some drafts of Biblical scenes. Likely under impression from Karl Bryullov's success with The Last Day of Pompeii, he dreamed to create an epic painting of the Messiah coming to people, but first he decided to try himself on lesser-scale picture. In 1834–1835 he finished Appearance of Jesus Christ to Maria Magdalena. The painting had great success both in Rome and St. Petersburg. The Russian Imperial Academy of Arts granted Ivanov an honorary academic degree in 1836.

He spent most of his life in Rome, where he befriended Gogol and was influenced by the Nazarenes.

=== The Appearance of Christ Before the People ===
Ivanov spent 20 years (1837–1857) in Rome, working on his greatest masterpiece The Appearance of Christ Before the People.

=== Death ===
Ivanov died of cholera on July 3, 1858. He was buried in St. Petersburg at the Novodevichy Cemetery. In 1936, he was reburied with the transfer of the monument to the Tikhvin Cemetery of the Alexander Nevsky Lavra.

=== Influence and critics ===
Critical judgement about Ivanov improved in the following generation. Some of the numerous sketches he had prepared for The Appearance have been recognized as masterpieces in their own right. The most comprehensive collections of his works are in the Russian Museum, St. Petersburg, and the Tretyakov Gallery, Moscow.

== Gallery ==
Alexander Andreyevich Ivanov's paintings

The Appearance of Christ Before the People (1837–57)

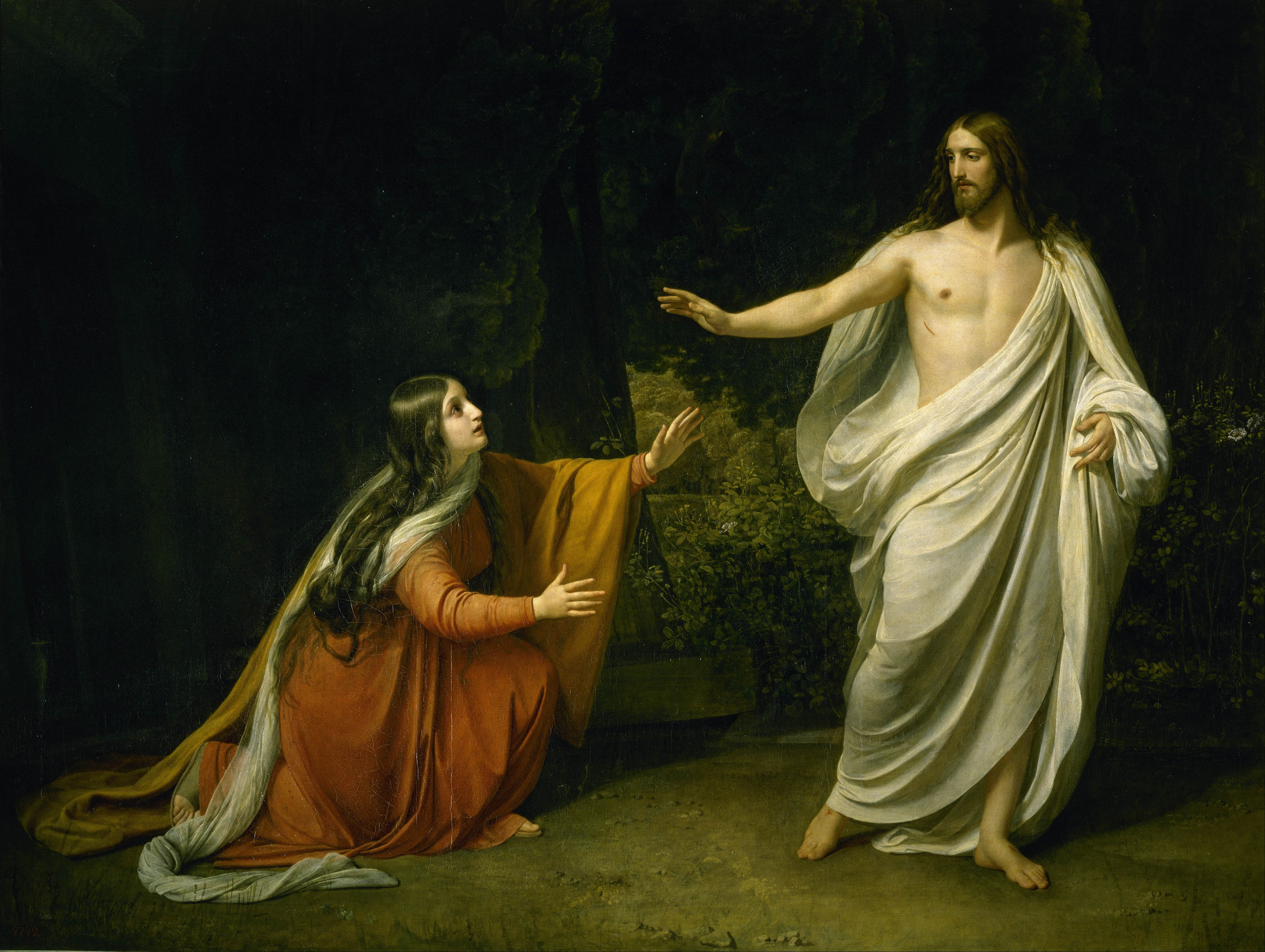
Noli me tangere, 1835

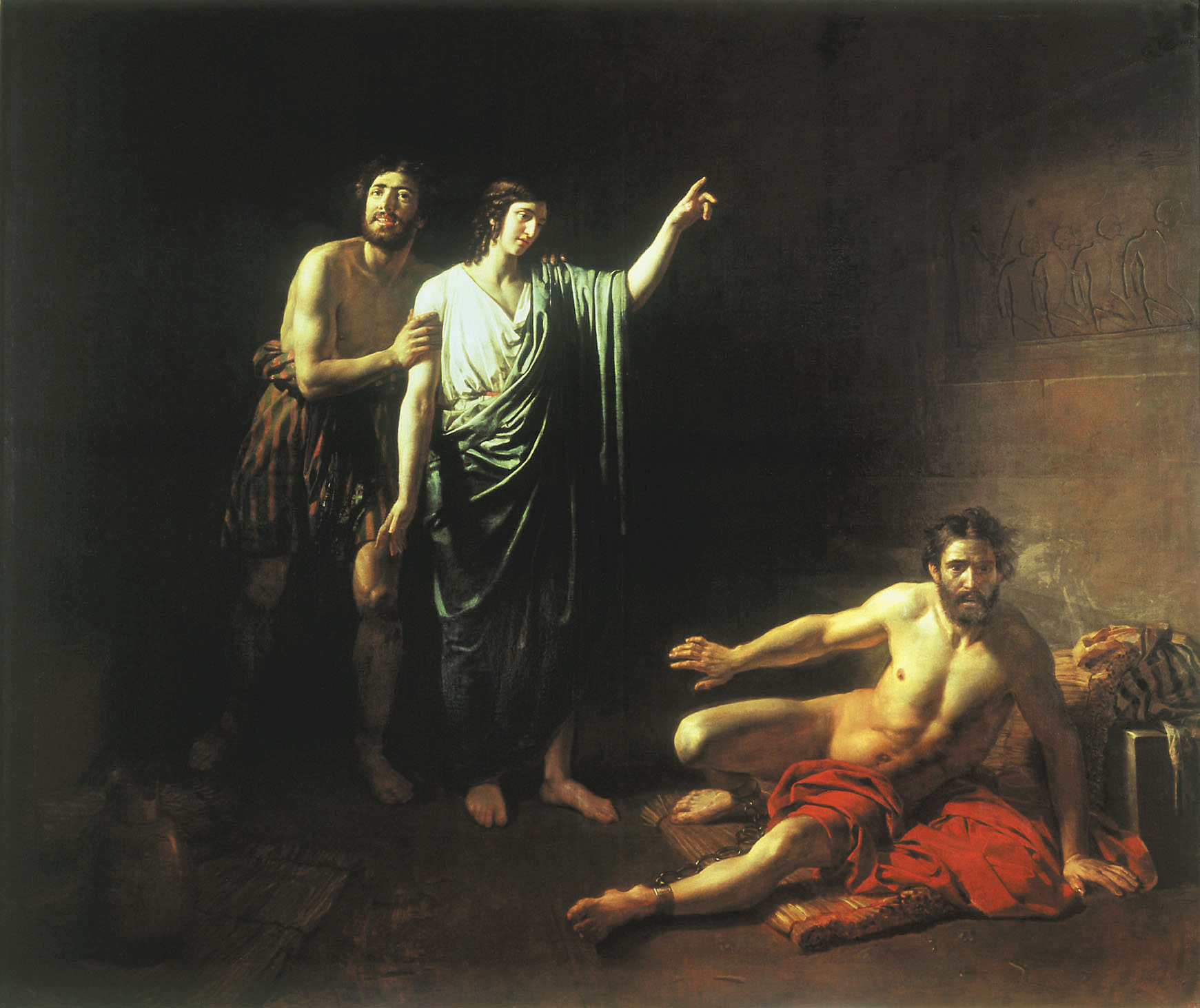
Joseph interprets the butler's and the baker's dreams, 1827

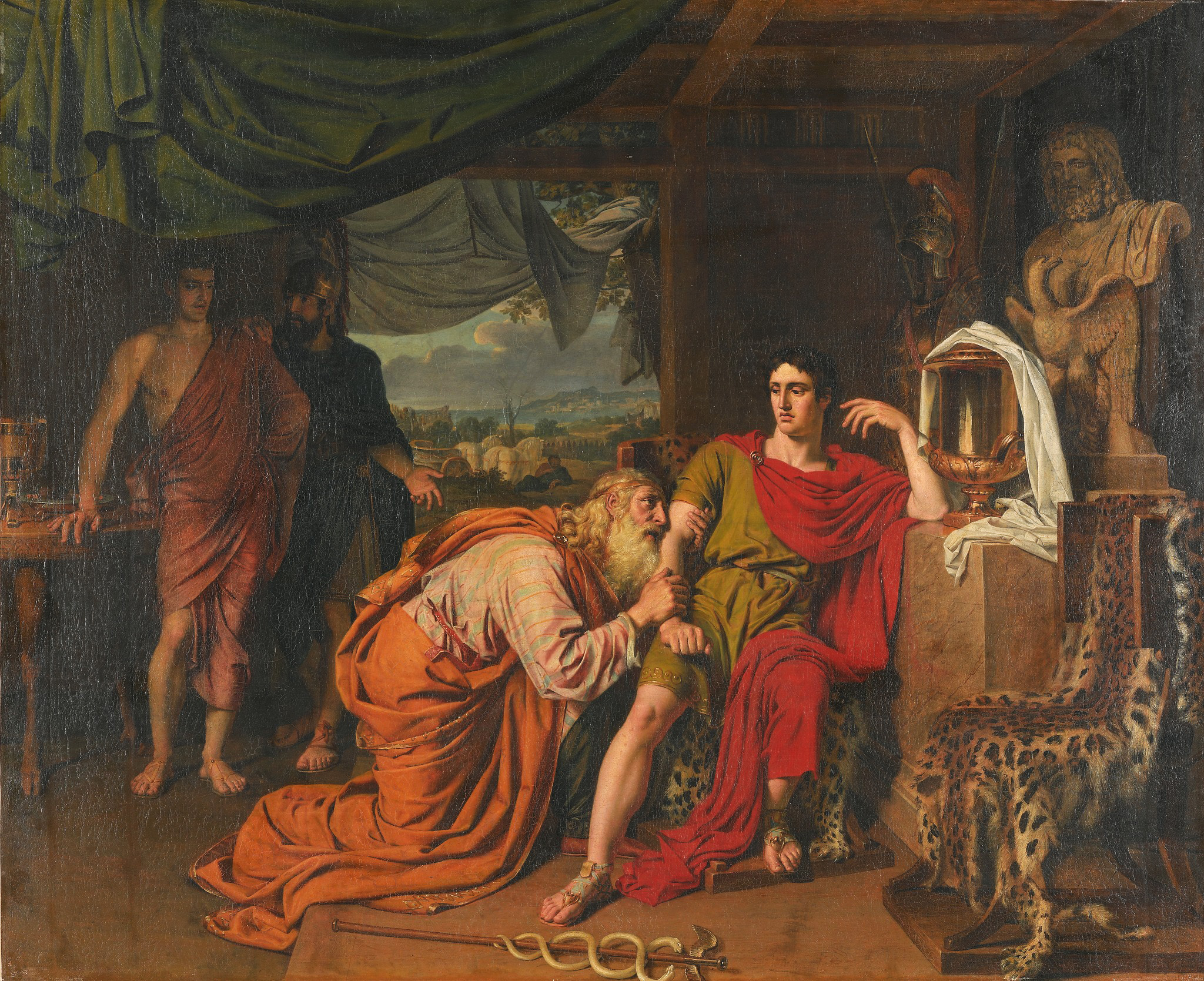
Priam Asking Achilles to Return Hector's Body, 1824

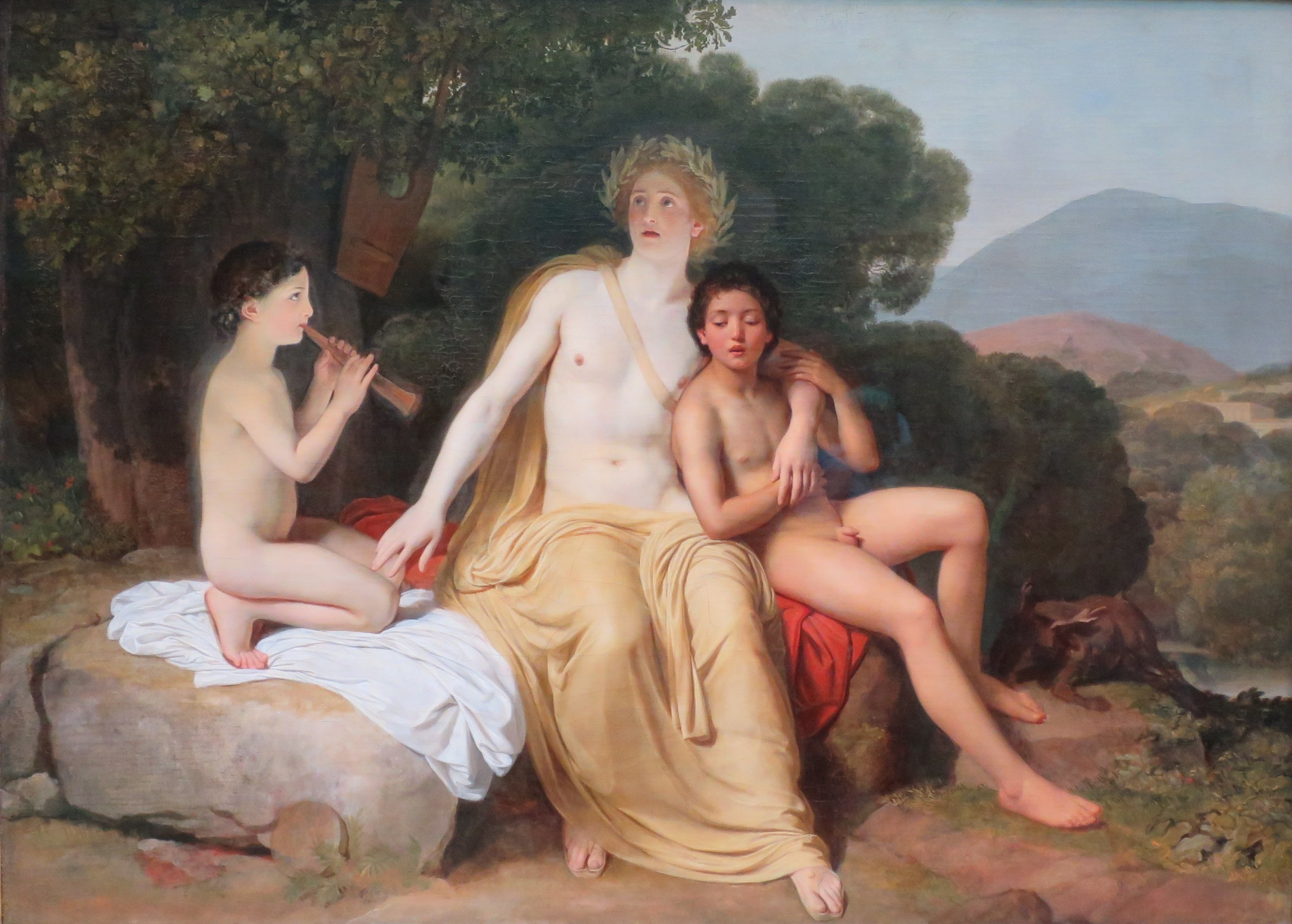
Apollo, Hyacinthus and Cyparis singing and playing, 1831–1834

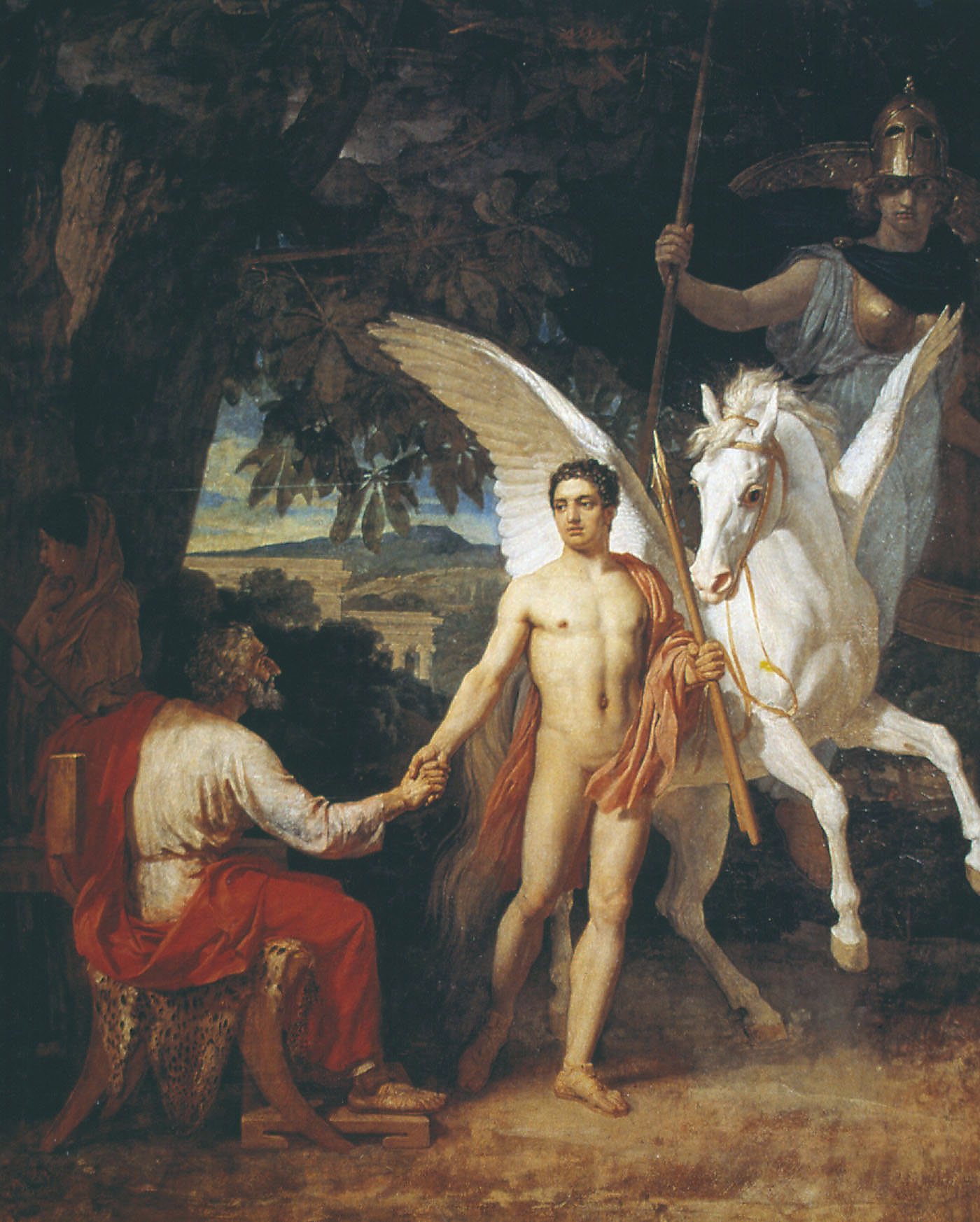
Bellerophon sent to a campaign against the Chimera, 1829

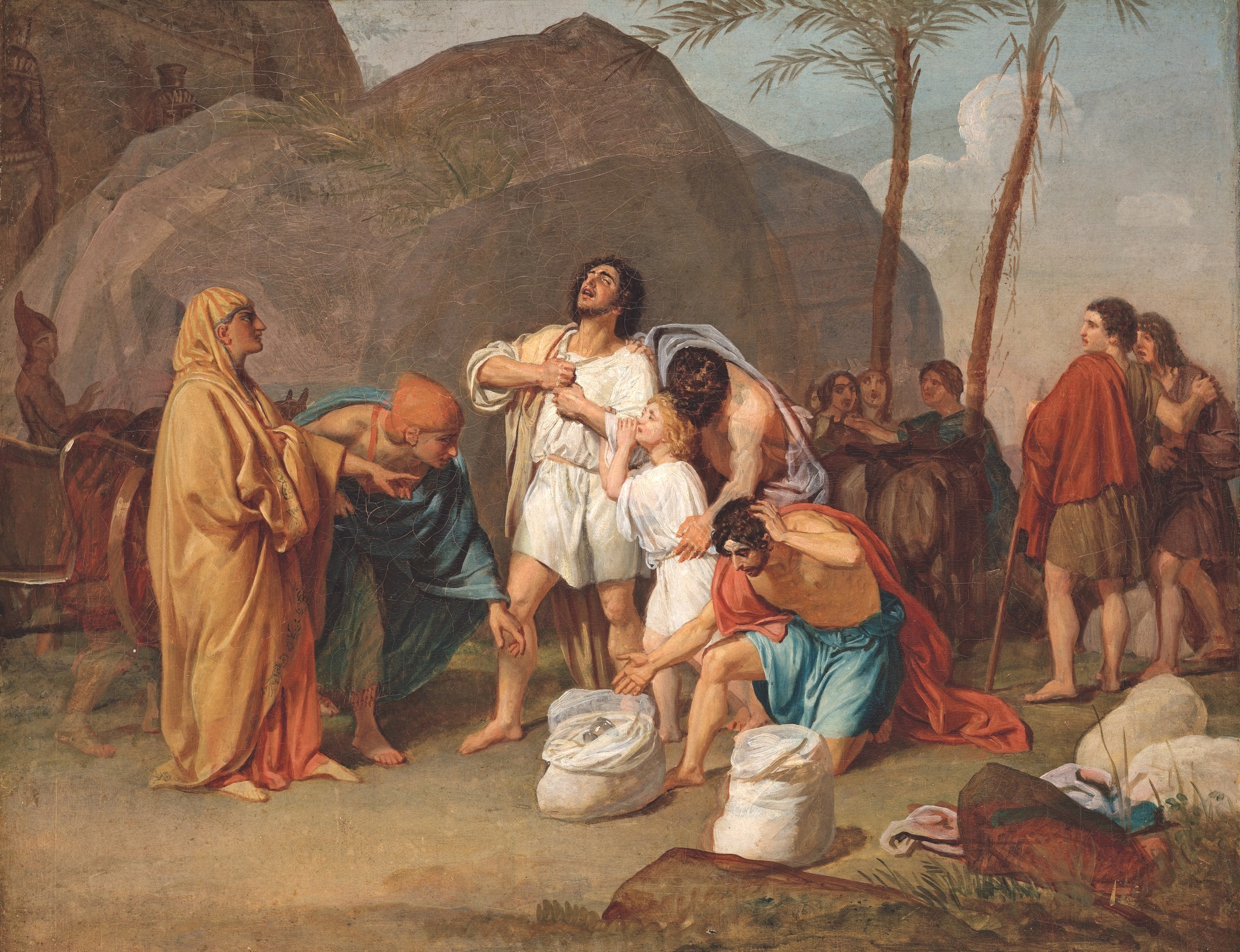
Joseph's Brothers Find the Silver Goblet in Benjamin's Pack, 1831–1833

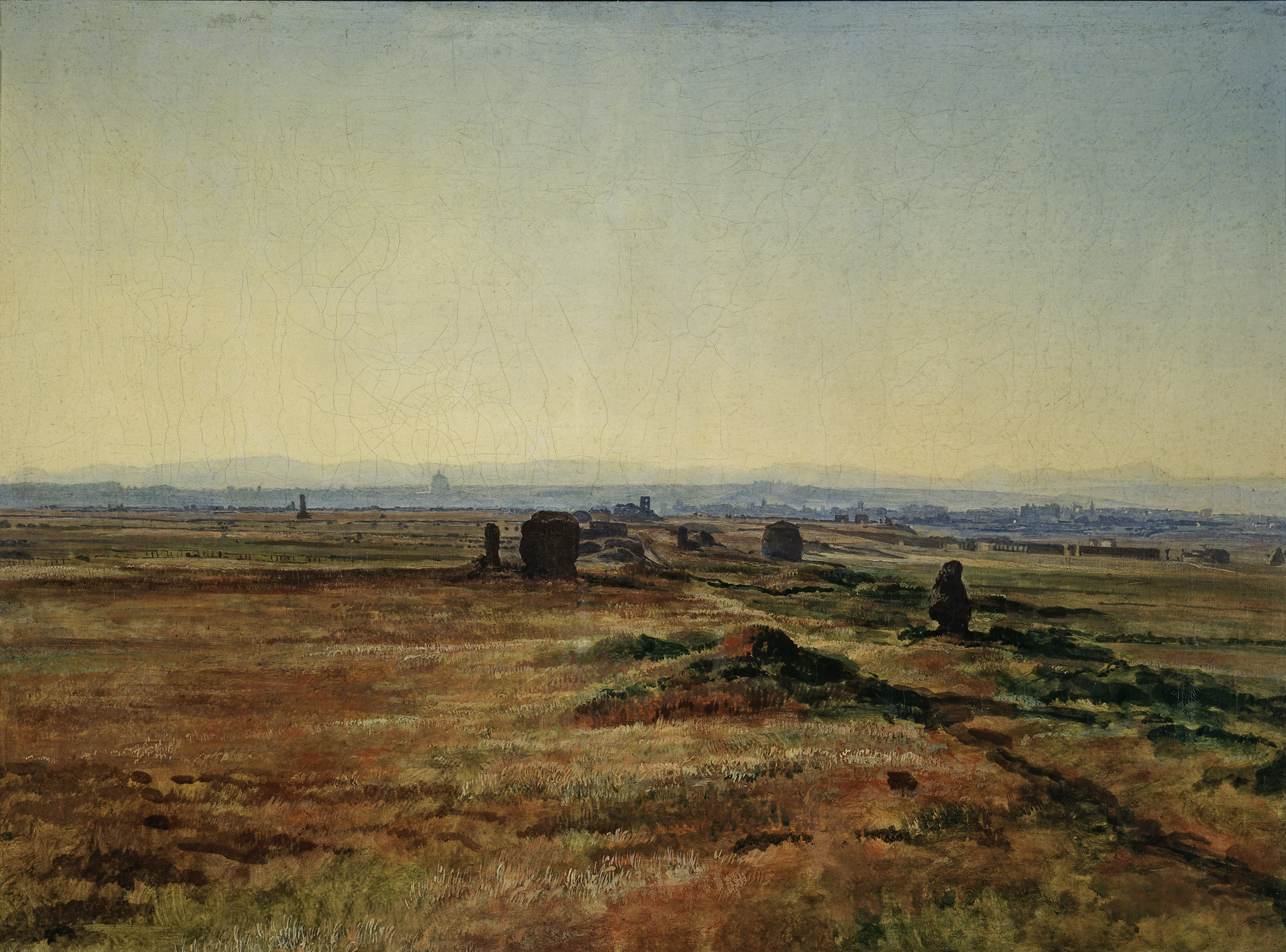
Appian Way at Sunset, 1845

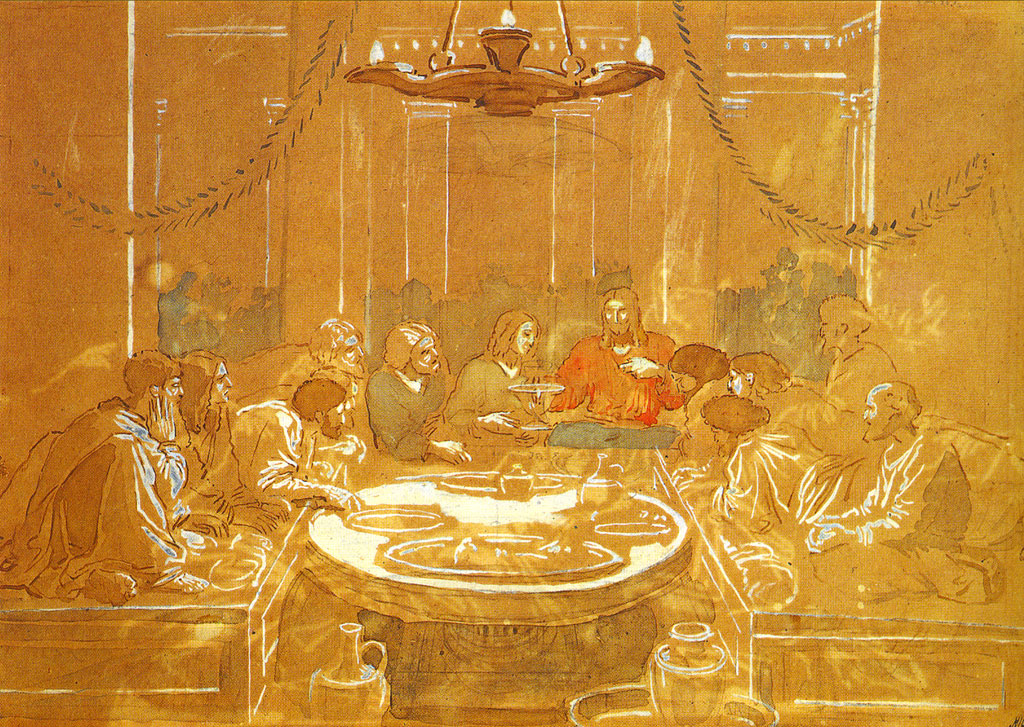
Last supper, 1850

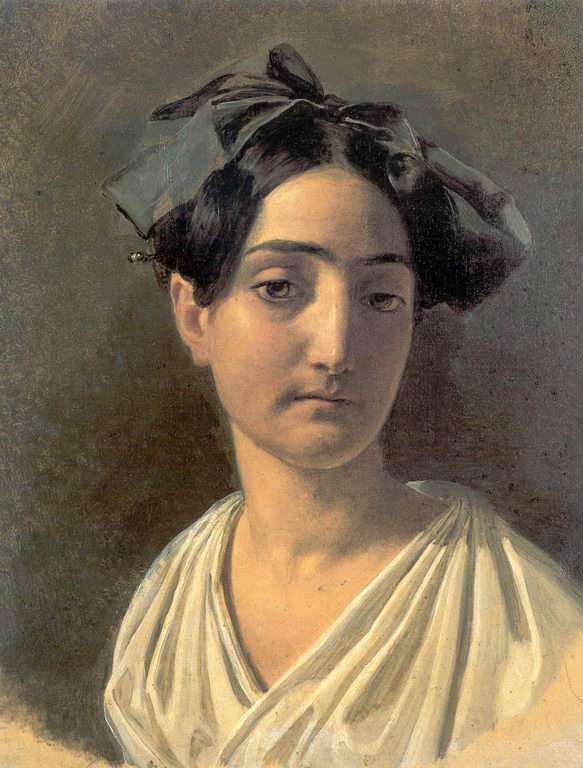
Vittoria Caldoni, 1834

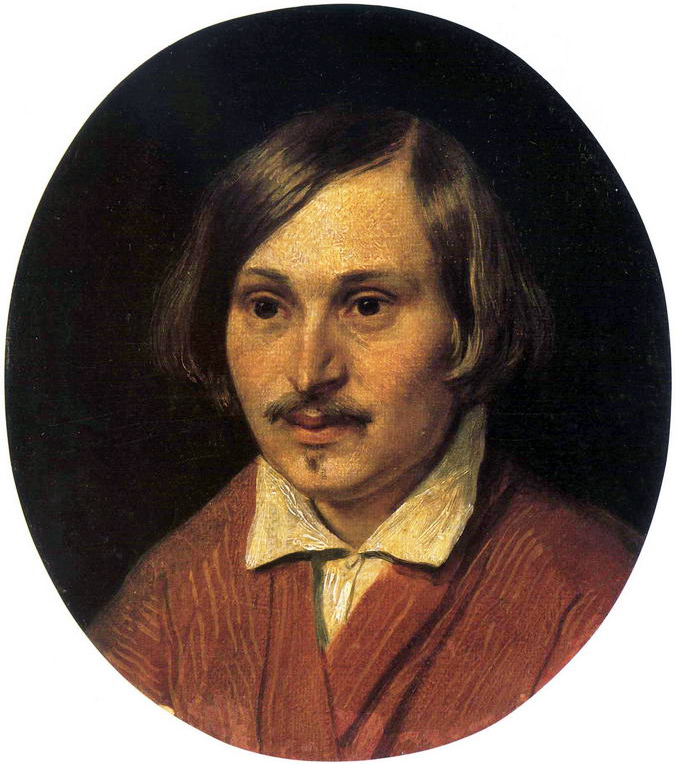
Nikolai Gogol, 1841

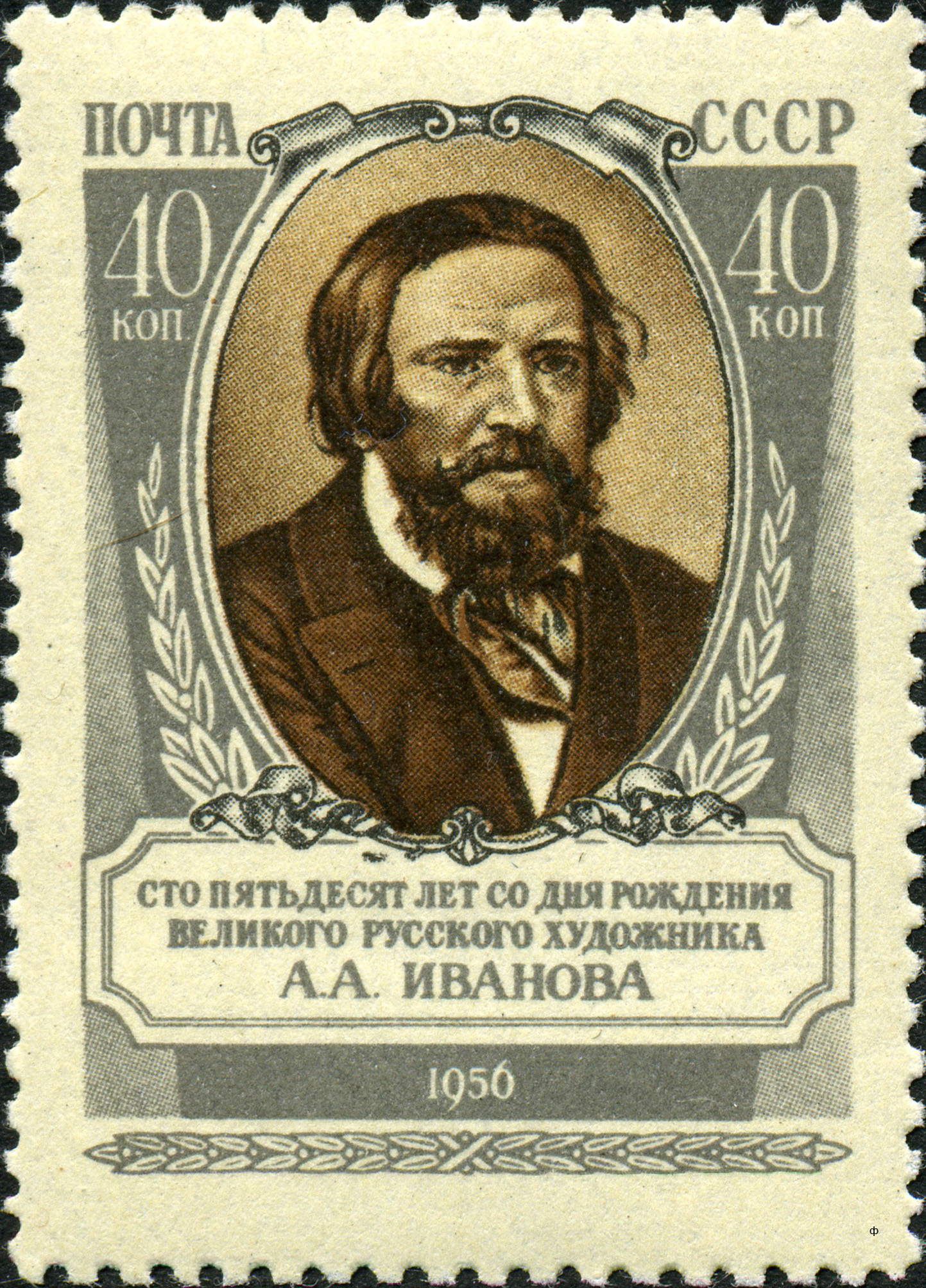
A. A. Ivanov 1956 commemorative postage stamp of the Union of Soviet Socialist Republics.

== Publications ==
- Ivanov, Alexander A.; et al. (1880). Botkin, Mikhail P. (ed.). Александр Андреевич Иванов: Его жизнь и переписка, 1806–1858 гг (in Russian). St. Petersburg: Mikhail Botkin. OCLC 27355439.
- Ivanov, Alexander A.; et al. (2001). Vinogradov, Igor A. [in Russian] (ed.). Александр Иванов в письмах, документах, воспоминаниях (in Russian). Moscow: XXI Vek — Soglasiye. ISBN 5-293-00034-9. OCLC 47271547.
