= Vyaznikovsky Uyezd =

Vyaznikovsky Uyezd (Вязниковский уезд ) was one of the subdivisions of the Vladimir Governorate of the Russian Empire. It was situated in the northeastern part of the governorate. Its administrative centre was Vyazniki.

== Demographics ==
At the time of the Russian Empire Census of 1897, Vyaznikovsky Uyezd had a population of 86,352. Of these, 99.9% spoke Russian as their native language.
