= Palekh miniature =

Russian folk handicraft

Palekh miniature (Russian: Палехская миниатюра) is a Russian folk handicraft of a miniature painting, which is done with tempera paints on varnished articles made of papier-mâché (including the creation of small boxes, cigarette cases, and powder cases).

== History ==
Palekh Russian lacquer art first appeared in 1923 in the town of Palekh, located in the Palekhsky District (Ivanovo Oblast). It emerged from a long local history of icon painting which was threatened at the Bolshevik revolution in 1917. To preserve their heritage, skilled icon artists applied their traditional techniques like tempera and gilding techniques to a new secular art form inspired by Fedoskino lacquer art. Instead of religious imagery, the first Palekh boxes depicted fairytales and folklore scenes.

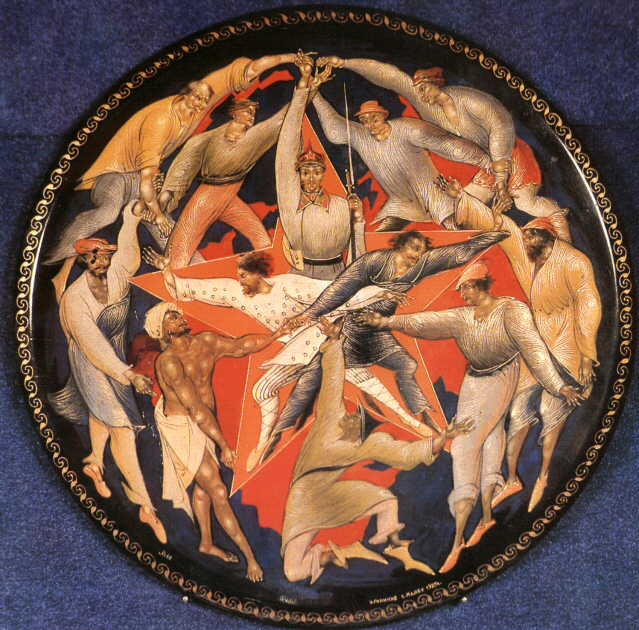
An allegorical representation of the Third International in a 1927 Palekh miniature by Ivan Golikov.

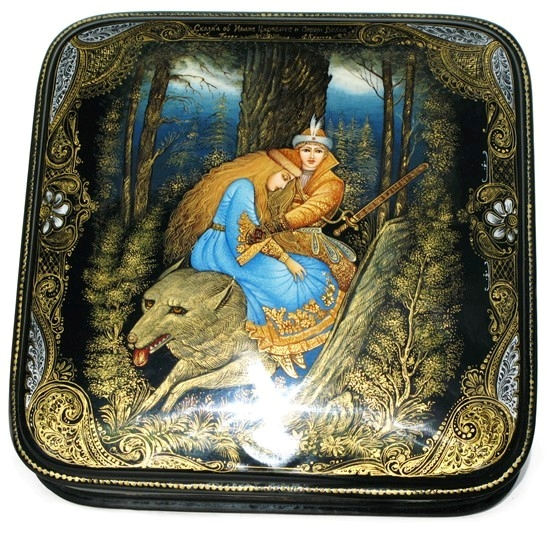
A scene from the fairy tale Tsarevitch Ivan, the Fire Bird and the Gray Wolf

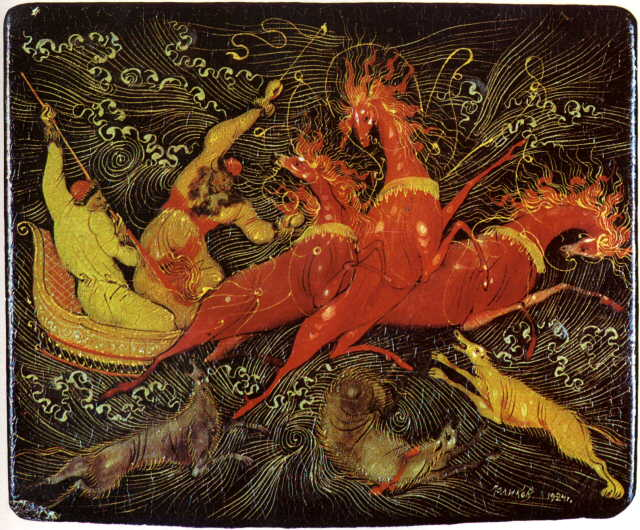
Palekh miniature. Troika with wolves.

== Palekh on Soviet postage stamps ==
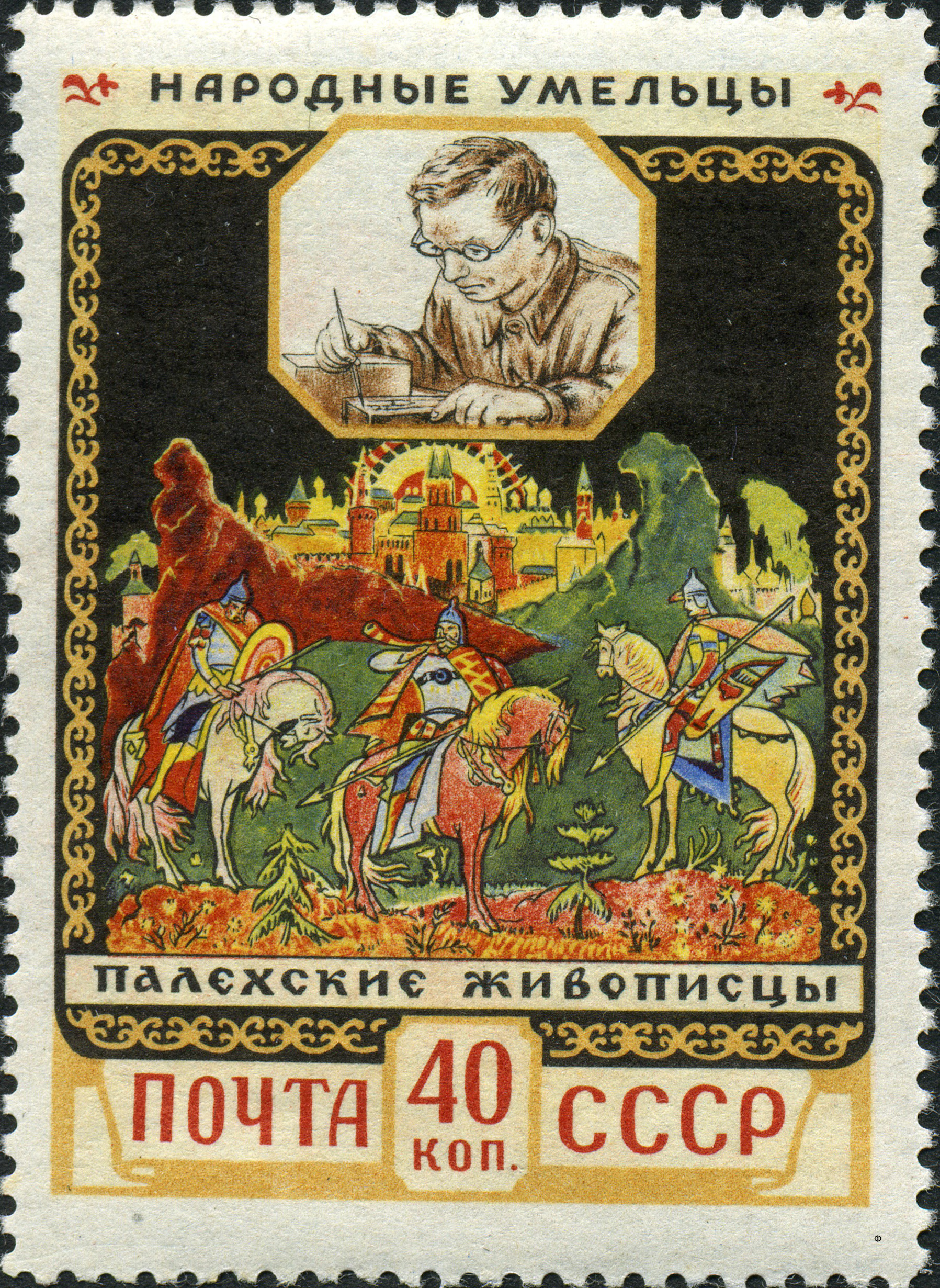
1958 stamp

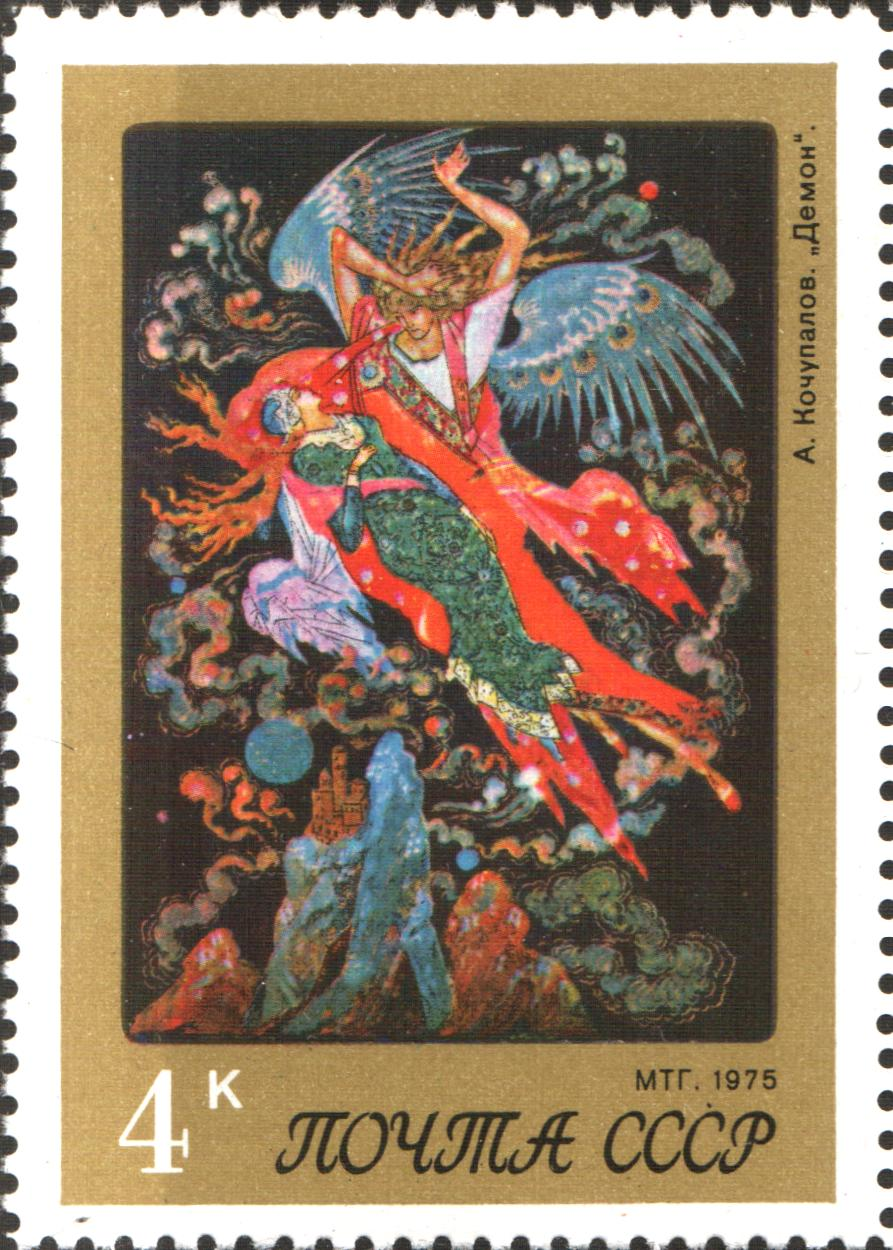
Demon by A. Kochupalov.

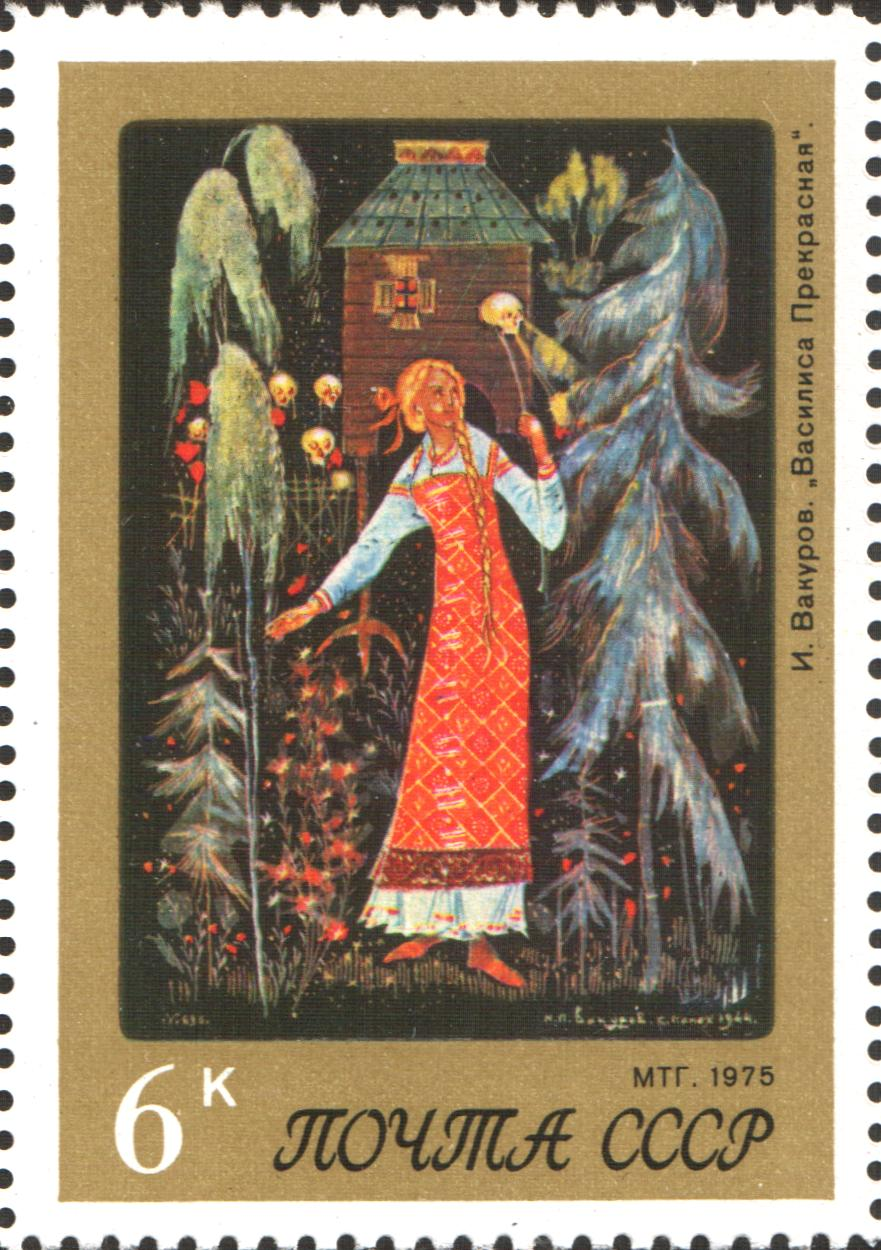
Vasilisa the Beautiful by I. Vakurov.

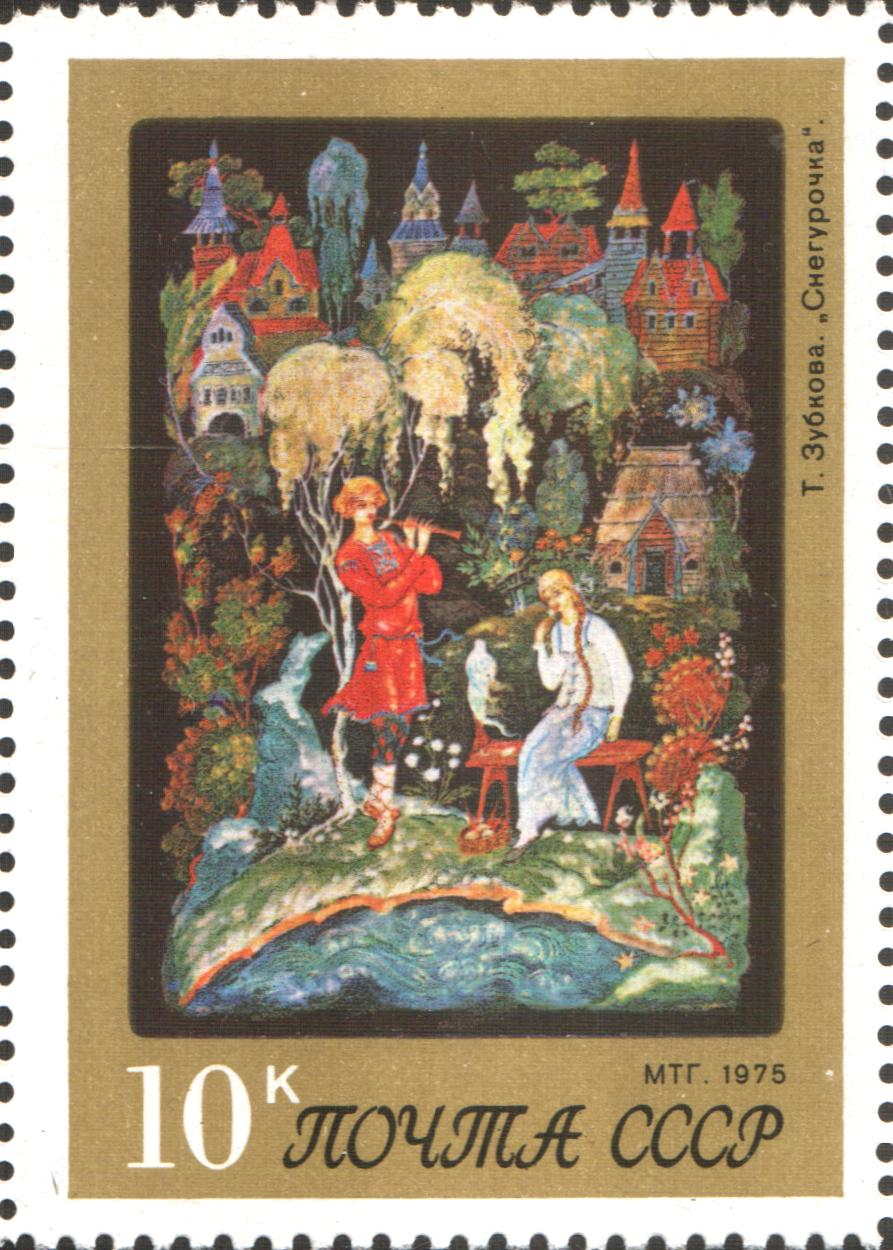
Snegurochka by T. Zubkova.

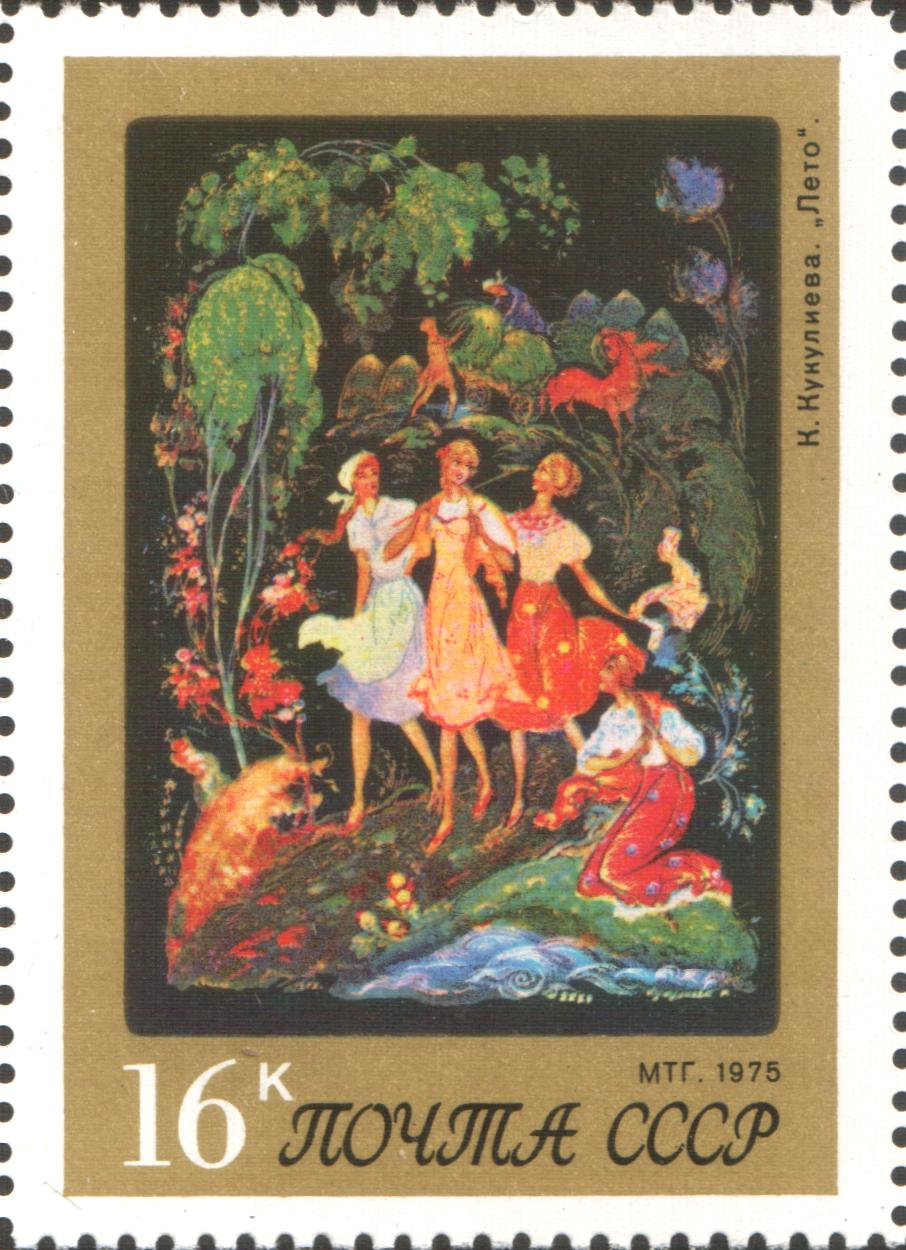
Summer by K. Kukuliyeva.
