= Testing the strength of Jan Usmar =

1796/1797 painting by Grigory Ugryumov

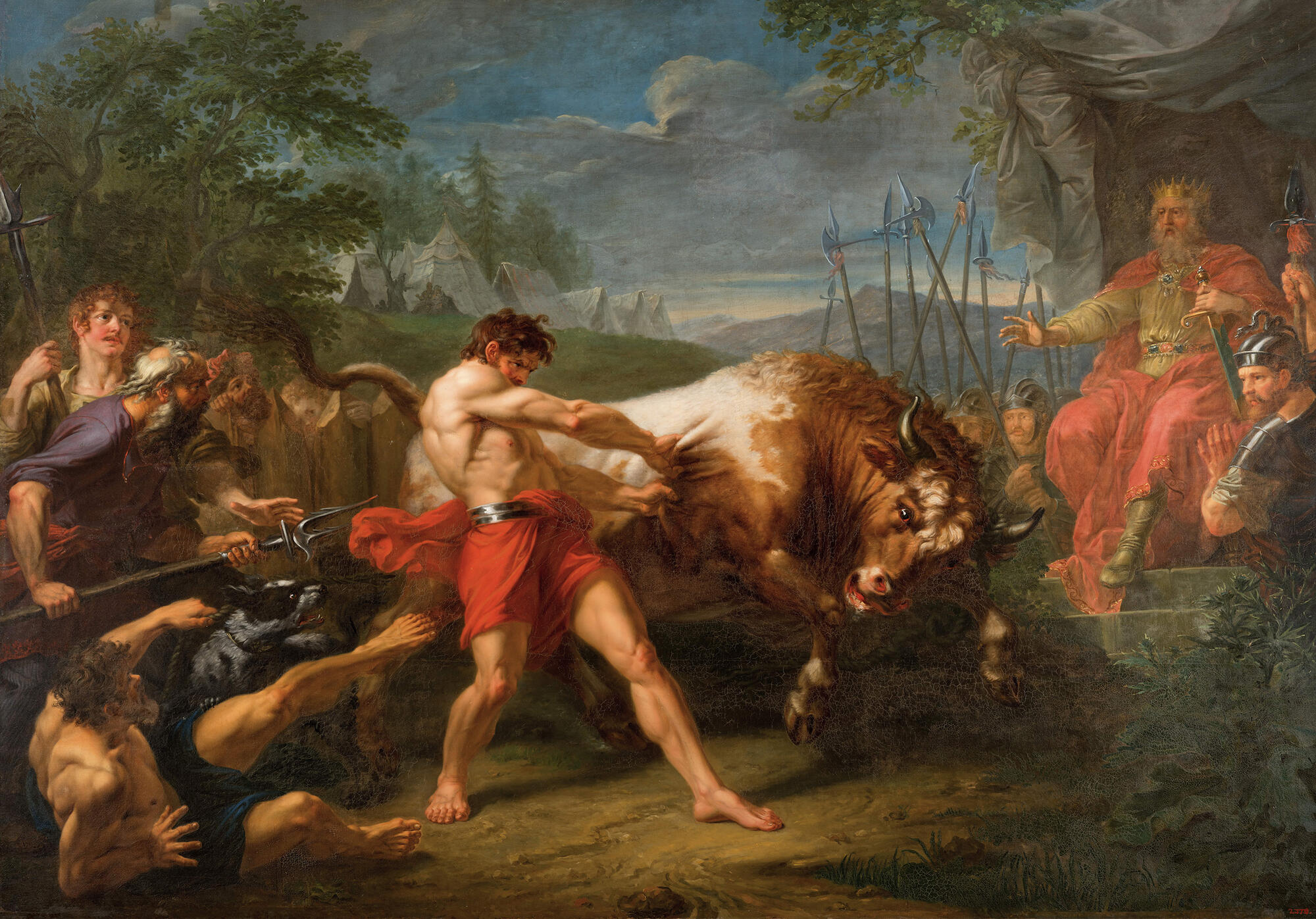
- Artist: Grigory Ugryumov
- Year: 1796 (1797?)
- Medium: Oil on canvas
- Dimensions: 283 cm × 404 cm (111 in × 159 in)
- Location: State Russian Museum, Saint Petersburg

Testing the strength of Jan Usmar is a painting by the Russian artist Grigory Ugryumov (1764–1823), completed in 1796 (or 1797). It is held in the State Russian Museum in St Petersburg (inventory Zh-5052). The dimensions of the painting are 283 × 404 cm. The longer title of the painting is also used, namely, "Prince Vladimir's testing of the strength of the Russian bogatyr Jan Usmar before his duel with the Pechenegian bogatyr."

The plot of the film is based on a chronicle story of the Battle of 992, in which the Old Russian army of Prince Vladimir Svyatoslavich emerged victorious against the Pechenegs. Before the battle began, it was necessary to find a warrior who would be capable of matching the Pechenegian bogatyr in combat. He turned out to be the son of a Kiev leatherworker, Jan Usmar, who with honour passed the test set for him - with his hands he stopped the running bull by tearing off a piece of leather.

In July 1797, following the completion of the painting by Ugryumov, it was approved by the extraordinary meeting of the Imperial Academy of Arts, and the artist was awarded the title of Academician. The canvas remained in the collection of the Academy of Arts for a considerable period, and in 1923 it was transferred to the State Russian Museum.

In the estimation of art historian Alla Vereshchagina, Testing the strength of Jan Usmar represents the pinnacle of Ugryumov's oeuvre, despite the fact that this painting is comparatively deficient in historical and ethnographic detail in comparison to some of the artist's other works. Art historian Alexei Savinov noted the effective composition of the canvas, which combines a dynamic group of warriors on the left, Prince Vladimir on the right, and Jan Usmar with an enraged bull in the centre. According to art historian Nonna Yakovleva, "mature mastery and inspired impulse not only distinguish 'Jan Usmar' among Ugryumov's works, but also give it a special place in the history of Russian art".

== History ==
=== Background and creation ===
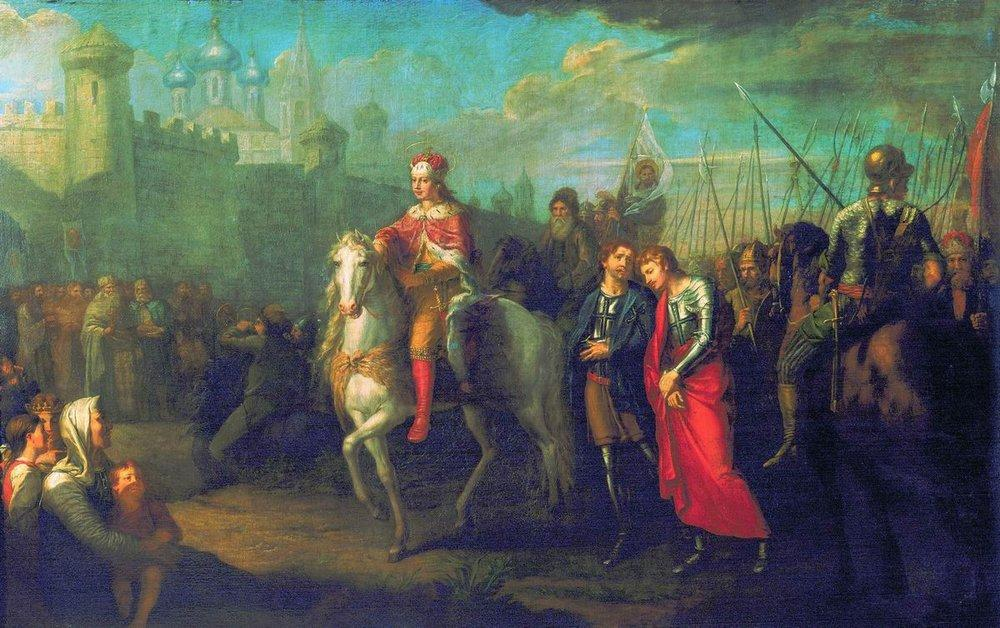
Grigory Ugryumov. Alexander Nevsky's Ceremonial Entry into the Town of Pskov after his Victory over the Germans (1793-1794, State Russian Museum)

Grigory Ugryumov studied at the Imperial Academy of Arts between 1770 and 1785. He was admitted to the Imperial Academy of Arts' educational school at the age of six. His tutors in the historical painting class were Gavriil Kozlov and Pyotr Sokolov; he also studied under Ivan Akimov. In 1785, Ugryumov was awarded the Small Gold Medal of the Academy of Arts for his painting, Hagar and Ishmael in the Desert (now housed in the State Russian Museum). In addition to the Medal, he received a certificate of the 1st degree and the privilege of a pensioner's trip abroad. As a pensioner of the Academy of Arts, Ugryumov worked in Italy between 1785 and 1790. Following his return to St Petersburg in 1791, he was appointed as a teacher in the historical painting class of the Academy of Arts. Between 1793 and 1794, he was commissioned by Empress Catherine II to create a large canvas, Alexander Nevsky's Ceremonial Entry into the Town of Pskov after his Victory over the Germans (now in the State Russian Museum).

In 1794 the Academy of Arts recognised Ugryumov as "appointed to the Academy." On 5 October 1795, (Note: The Julian calendar ('old style') is used to date events that took place in the Russian Empire.) the Academy Council presented him with a programme for the title of academician, the nature of which was defined as follows: "On the battlefield, in the presence of Grand Prince Vladimir, the youngest son of the Russian warrior demonstrates his unusual strength by grabbing a raging bull at full gallop by its side with his hand, tearing away skin and flesh as much as he could grasp." The term "youngest son" is understood to refer to the hero of the chronicle tale, Jan Usmar. The precise date on which the artist completed the painting is uncertain; it may have been in either 1796 or 1797. In the catalogue guide of the State Russian Museum, published in 1948, the creation date was indicated as "circa 1797". In subsequent catalogues and on the website of the Russian Museum, the creation date is listed as "1796 (1797?)." The painting was completed during a complex period in Russian history, as Catherine II died on 6 November 1796, and her son Pavel Petrovich, known as Paul I, became emperor.

=== Subsequent events ===
On 15 July 1797, the painting Testing the strength of Jan Usmar was approved by the extraordinary meeting of the Imperial Academy of Arts, and Grigory Ugryumov was awarded the title of Academician of the Academy for it. Subsequently, the painting was housed within the Academy of Arts. In the 1818 catalogue of the Academy, it was catalogued under number 370 as "Testing the strength of Pereyaslavl". In 1798, Ugryumov was awarded the title of adjunct professor, and in 1800, he was appointed professor of the Academy of Arts. During this period, he created two large-scale historical paintings: Invitation of Mikhail Fyodorovich Romanov to Tsardom and Capture of Kazan by Ivan the Terrible (both completed by 1800, now in the State Russian Museum).

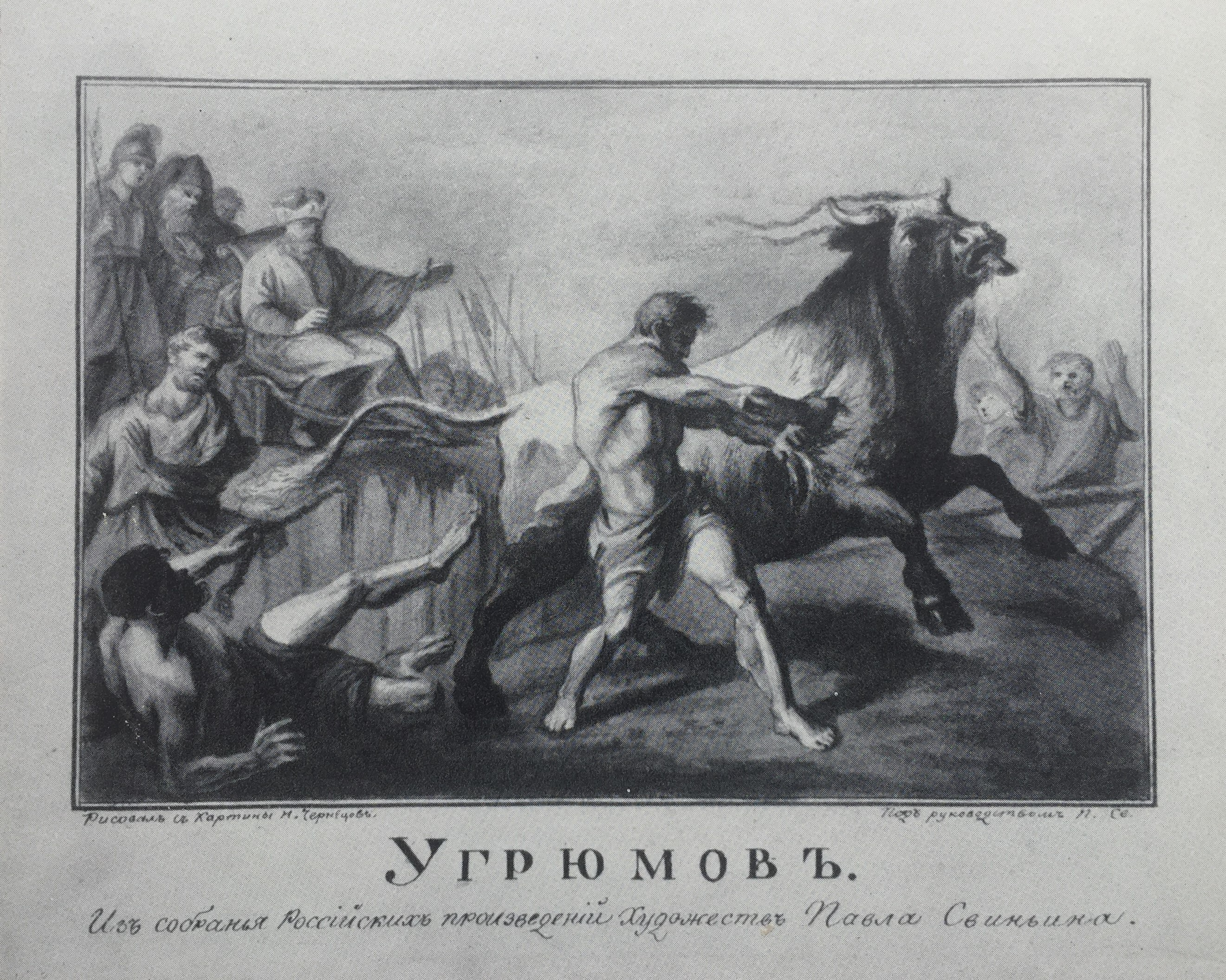
Nikanor Chernetsov. Jan Usmar (drawing from a sketch (?) by Grigory Ugryumov, 1820s)

A number of sources indicate that for a period of time, the painting Testing the strength of Jan Usmar was in the collection of the writer Pavel Svinyin. In particular, it was one of the exhibits of the 'Russian Museum' opened by him in 1819, which existed until 1834. On the other hand, art historian Zinaida Zonova believes that Svinyin had another iteration of this painting (potentially a sketch) bearing the same title. This version was utilized by the artist Nikanor Chernetsov in the 1820s as a reference for a drawing, which is catalogued under number 78 in the album of sketches of exhibits from the 'Russian Museum'. Regarding Chernetsov's drawing, Zonova wrote: "This drawing provides an opportunity to get acquainted with the initial sketch for the composition, where Ugryumov outlined and later transferred to the painting only two figures in the foreground and the depiction of the bull. The other figures have been regrouped and altered. The images of both the warriors and Vladimir in the painting bear no resemblance to the rough, bearded men in simple shirts in Chernetsov's drawing. Here, Vladimir is less prominent among the people, he is a squat old man with a cap pulled down to his eyes and wearing wide, simple clothing. There is none of the grandeur, characteristic of Vladimir's figure in Ugryumov's interpretation, here."

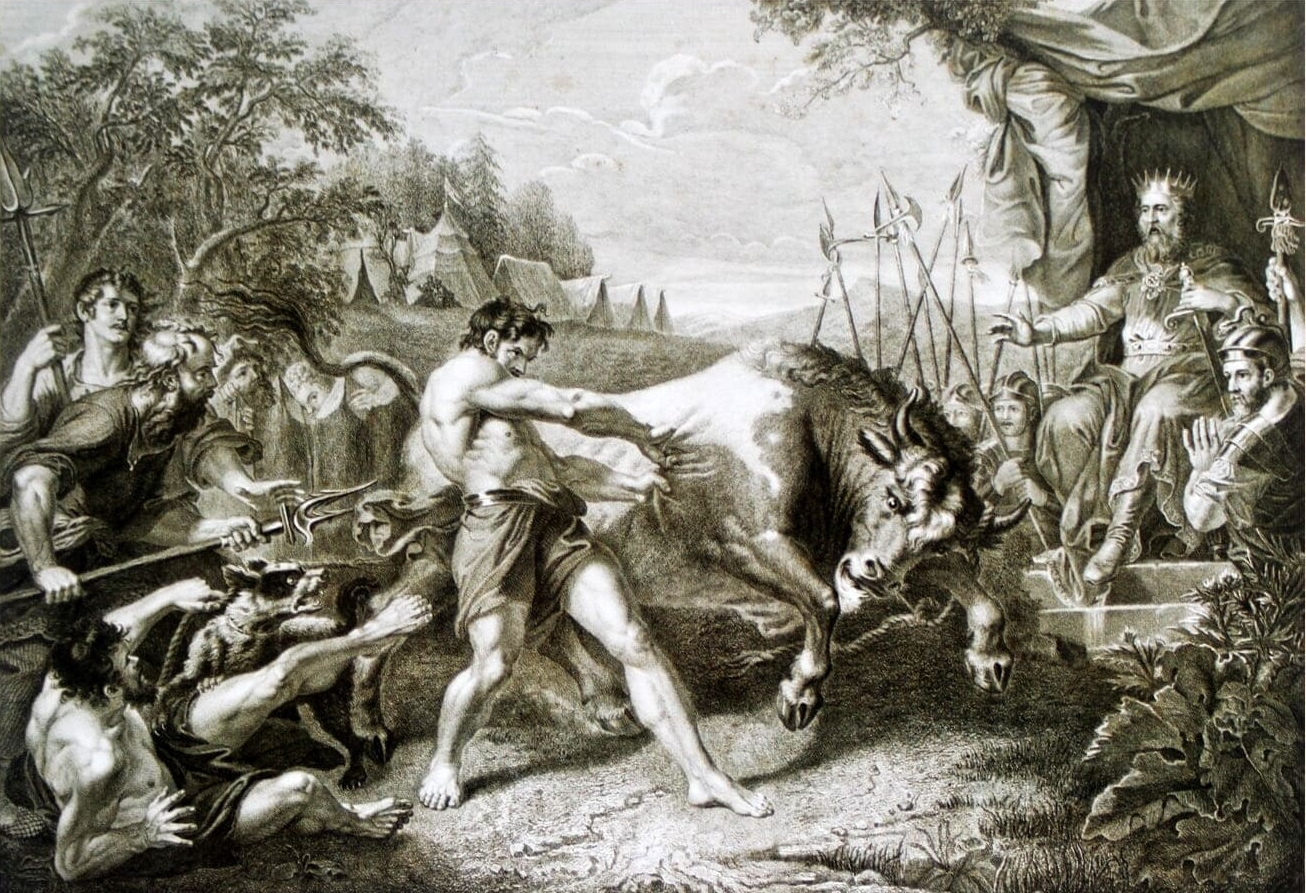
Ivan Pozhalostin. Testing the strength of Jan Usmar (engraving from a painting by Grigory Ugryumov, 1880)

In the early 1840s, the painting was once more listed as part of the Academy of Arts' collection, appearing as item number 59 in the Index of Works in the Academy of Arts (St Petersburg, Fischer Publishing House, 1842). In the catalogue of Russian paintings in the Museum of the Imperial Academy of Arts, published in 1915, the painting Testing the strength of Jan Usmar was listed at number 36. This was the only work by Ugryumov mentioned in the catalogue.

In 1850, the draughtsman and engraver Fyodor Iordan created three drawings from the painting Testing the strength of Jan Usmar. He later also produced an engraving based on this painting. In 1880, the engraver Ivan Poglostin created an engraving of the same name based on Ugryumov's painting. This work was recognised with the title of Honorary Free Member of the Academy of Arts.

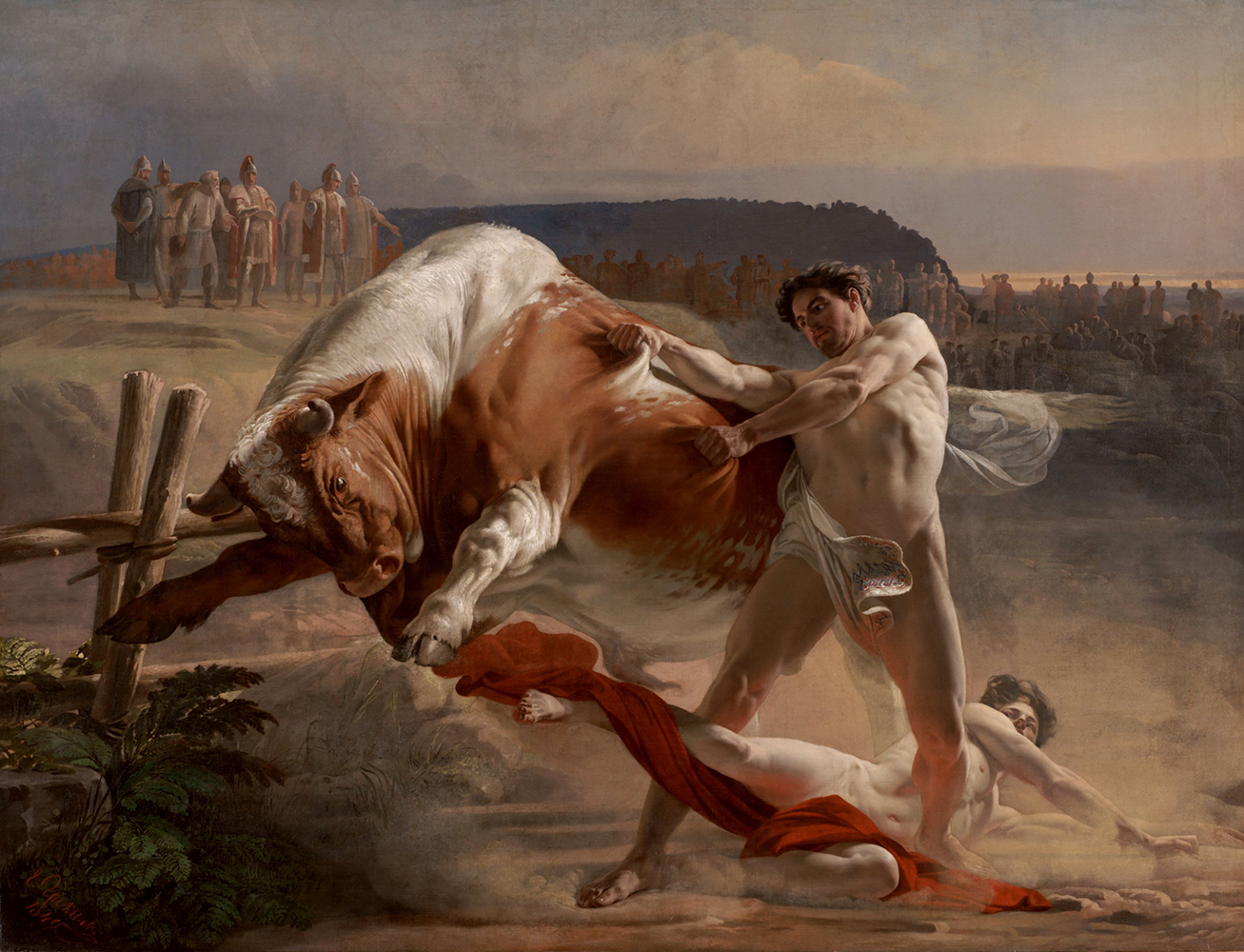
Evgraf Sorokin. Jan Usmovets Stopping an Angry Bull (1849, Far Eastern Art Museum)

The figure of Usmar in Ugryumov's interpretation had a great influence on the students of the Academy of Arts. It is known about the existence of a drawing by Sylvester Shchedrin (early 19th century, State Russian Museum), which replicates the image of Usmar in minute detail. The image of one of the priests in Orest Kiprensky's drawing, entitled Pagan Priests Killing Christians in the Temple of Perun (circa 1803, State Tretyakov Gallery), also bears a striking resemblance to the figure of Usmar. According to art historian Vladislav Zimenko, in this sketch by Kiprensky "the influence of Ugryumov is evident, for example, in the powerful athletic figure of the pagan on the far left, vividly reminiscent of Jan Usmar." The sculptor Boris Orlovsky employed the central group of Ugryumov's painting, comprising Usmar and the bull, in his 1831 sculpture, entitled 'Jan Usmar'. Furthermore, as part of an academic competition in 1849, a painting on the same theme was created by the artist Evgraf Sorokin. He was awarded a substantial gold medal and the privilege of an overseas pensioner excursion for this painting, entitled Jan Usmovets Holding the Bull (also known as Jan Usmovets Stopping an Angry Bull, canvas, oil, 207 × 266 cm, now in the Far Eastern Art Museum, inv. Zh-609).

In 1923, the painting Testing the strength of Jan Usmar was transferred from the Academy of Arts to the State Russian Museum. In the period 2013-2014, a comprehensive restoration of the painting was undertaken. The objective was to reinforce the canvas, paint layer and ground, as well as to clean the yellowed varnish layer. The work on the painting Testing the strength of Jan Usmar was carried out by a team from the State Russian Museum's Restoration Department, including Marat Dashkin, Alexander Minin and Natalia Romanova. Following the restoration, which was completed at the end of 2014, the renovated painting was displayed at an exhibition held to mark the 250th anniversary of Grigory Ugryumov's birth. The painting Testing the strength of Jan Usmar is included in the permanent collection of the Russian Museum. It is exhibited in Hall 15 of the Mikhailovsky Palace, where it is displayed alongside other notable works, including Andrey Ivanov's The Young Hero from Kiev, Fyodor Bruni's The Brazen Serpent, Alexander Ivanov's Christ's Appearance to Mary Magdalene after the Resurrection, as well as his sketches and studies for the painting The Appearance of Christ Before the People.

== Subject, characters and composition ==
The plot is based on a chronicle story about the Battle of Trubizh in 992, in which the Old Russian army, led by Prince Vladimir Svyatoslavich, defeated the Pechenegs. Before the battle, the Pechenegs had offered for someone from the Old Russian army to fight with their bogatyr. Prince Vladimir "sent out heralds to announce: 'Is there no man who will fight the Pecheneg?'" And the Kiev leatherworker came to him and told him about his youngest son - Jan Usmar (other spellings include Usmoshvets, Usmovich or Ushmovets), who was not distinguished by great height, but was so strong that he could tear the skin with his hands. When Jan Usmar was brought before Prince Vladimir, he was given a trial involving a bull (ox), which he honorably passed: "and the bull ran past him, and he grabbed it by the side with his hand, tearing away skin and flesh as much as his hand could grasp." After this, Jan Usmar entered into combat with a Pecheneg warrior: "and they grappled, and the man strangled the Pecheneg to death with his hands." This led to the victory of the Old Russian army: "and the Russians cheered, and the Pechenegs fled, and the Russians pursued them, striking them down and driving them away." In honor of this victory, Prince Vladimir founded the city of Pereiaslav on the site of the battle.

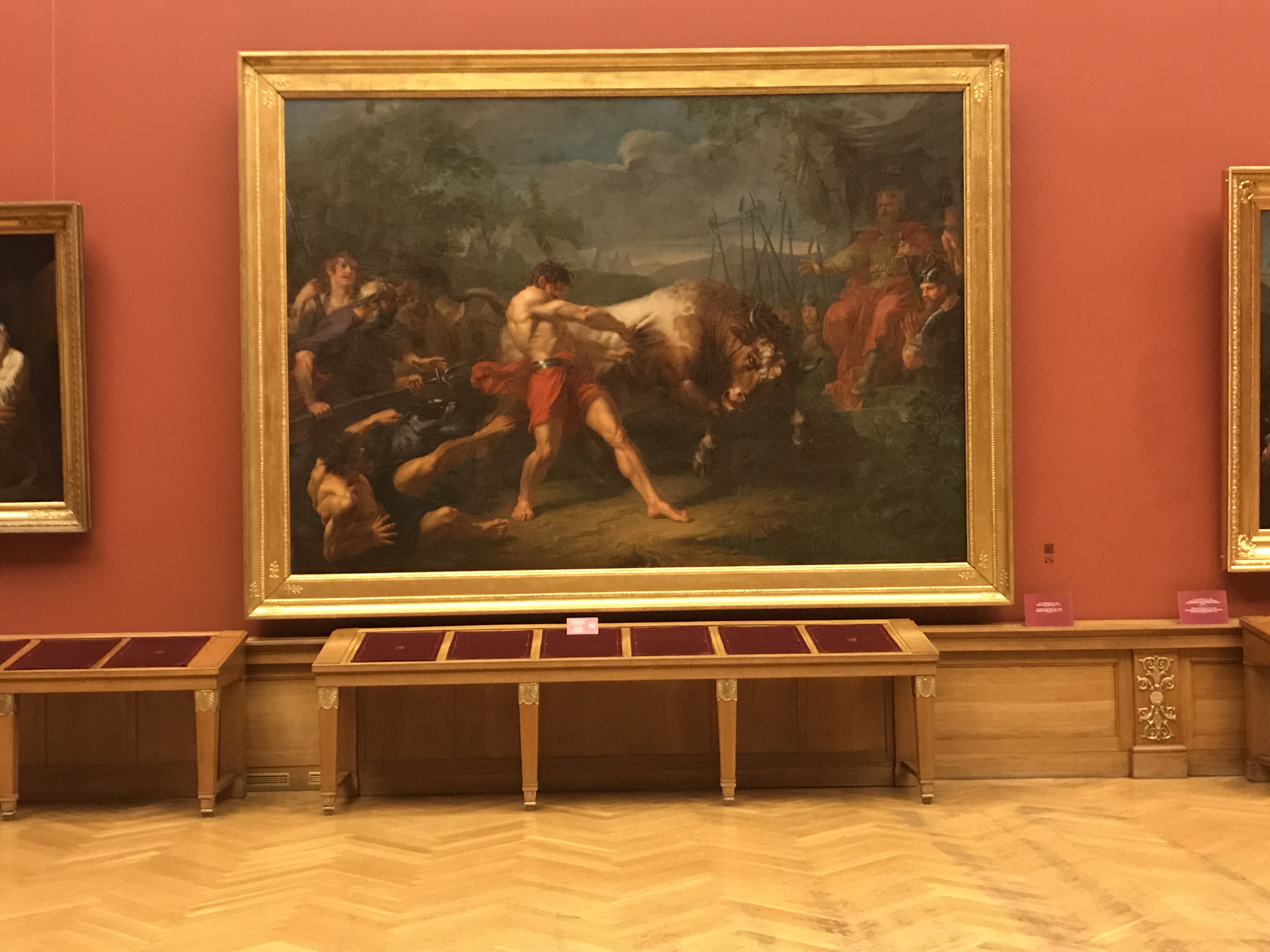
The painting Testing the strength of Jan Usmar in the State Russian Museum

The composition is centred on a close-up of the figure of Jan Usmar, who is depicted as stopping a white and red bull. The bull appears to have been annoyed by the jabs of tridents and the barking of dogs. The bull moves from the left to the right, towards Prince Vladimir, who is seated on a throne placed on an elevated platform at the right edge of the canvas. The painting depicts the dynamic moment when Jan Usmar, extending his left leg forward for balance, grasps the bull's hide firmly with both hands. According to art historian Nonna Yakovleva, "the movement is halted at that natural yet nearly imperceptible moment to the eye, when, just before a decisive tug, the man's muscles, filling with stone-like tension, freeze for a moment."

The heroic figure of Usmar, as if rooted to the ground, serves as the central axis of the composition. Usmar is semi-nude, wearing only a red-brick colored hip drapery, tucked under the band of a gold belt. Shown in profile by the artist, the hero is entirely absorbed in his struggle with the bull; his face, with eyes flashing in anger, is half-covered by his hand. Usmar's left leg is positioned nearly at the center of the canvas, emphasizing the primary meaning conveyed by his stance—"a halt, resistance to motion." Art historian Alla Vereshchagina wrote that Ugryumov's Jan Usmar is "a man with the muscles of Heracles, a wrestler, a warrior, the embodiment of physical power." As he stops the bull, Jan Usmar leans back, and the tension in his back muscles underscores the resistance he exerts against the animal's movement. The fallen warrior's figure lies in a position similar to where Usmar himself might have ended up if he had failed to subdue the bull—this technique aligns with the "method of simultaneous depiction of movement stages" often used in painting.

Prince Vladimir is attired in a yellow robe adorned with a red mantle, and upon his head is a golden crenellated crown. With his left hand, he holds the hilt of his sword. The throne of the prince, to which three stone steps lead, is covered with a white baldachin. Vladimir personifies the quality of wise unhurriedness, and he and the soldiers around him unflinchingly observe the proceedings. "With a slight wave of his hand," the prince seems to direct Usmar's actions—thus, in Ugryumov's interpretation, this episode from ancient Russian history "transforms almost into an allegory of the ideal relationship between supreme power and the people, capable of creating wonders together." In line with the artist's view of a military leader, the prince maintains a calmness that, according to historian and art historian Nina Moleva, "appears forced and insufficiently justified." However, another interpretation suggests that Vladimir's raised right hand could signify "restrained fear," and the movement of the warrior in a helmet topped with a serpent might be seen as an attempt to protect the prince from a potential attack by the enraged bull.

The bull is chased from behind by an old man with a pitchfork and a dog held by a fallen warrior. It is possible that the two men depicted near the palisade on the left side of the painting are Jan Usmar's father and brother. Art historian Alexei Savinov observed the "spirituality and attractiveness" of the face of the young man positioned on the left and posited that it foreshadows the imagery of Vasily Tropinin's subsequent works. In the background on the left is a camp situated on a hillside, with a mountain visible on the right. The sky, covered with blue clouds, shows the pinkish-lilac glow of dawn.

Fragments of the painting Testing the strength of Jan Usmar

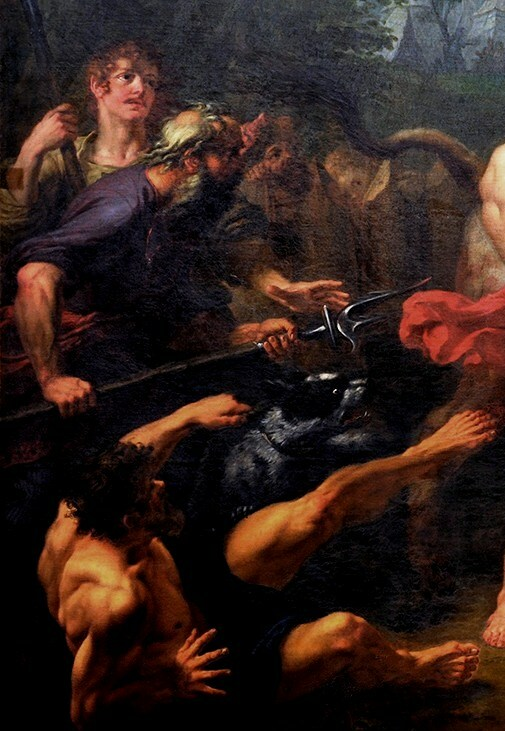
The group of warriors on the left

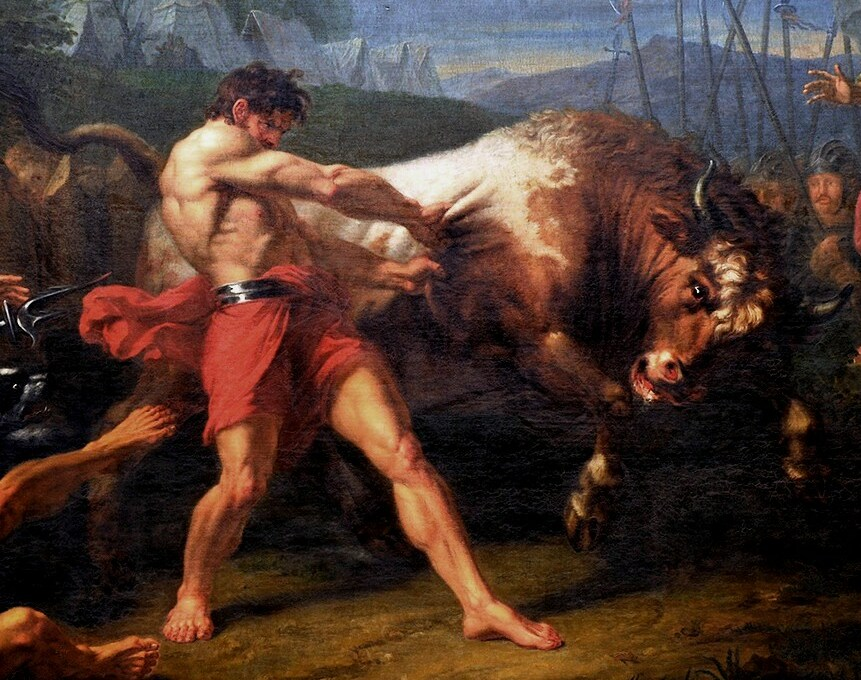
Jan Usmar with the bull

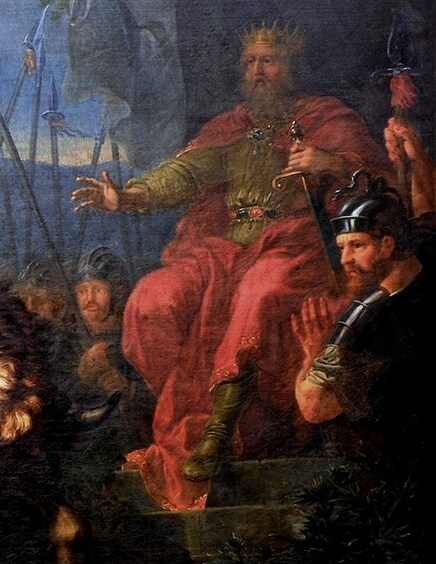
Prince Vladimir and the warriors

The model for painting Jan Usmar was a Tatar man named Yuzey (Yusuf). Ugryumov personally found this man, who stood out due to his athletic physique and "remarkable musculature." Following this, Yuzey became a regular model at the Academy of Arts. According to Alexey Olenin (president of the Academy of Arts from 1817 to 1843), the Yuzey worked as a model at the Academy for over twenty years—"he had quite a well-built body, particularly in the torso and arms, and therefore, in our academic school of that time, the torso was excellently depicted."

== Reviews and criticism ==
In his analysis of the painting Testing the strength of Jan Usmar, the art critic Fyodor Bulgakov observed that the work contains numerous anachronisms. This is due to the fact that, in the late 18th century, it was challenging to obtain reliable information about the customs and cultural nuances of the period. Consequently, it was necessary to draw upon works of classical art. As a result, according to Bulgakov, Prince Vladimir, with his crown and sword "turned into a Roman emperor" and "a Russian worrior into a gladiator." Nonetheless, Bulgakov conceded that "one cannot but recognise significant merits in Ugryumov's painting" - "it has a lot of life, a lot of movement, the colouring shows taste and is harmonious."

Art historian Vladislav Zimenko noted the energetic and emotional tone of Ugryumov's painting Testing the strength of Jan Usmar, in which "a hero is depicted tearing a piece of hide from the side of a raging, charging bull to demonstrate his immense strength." He further wrote: "It is notable that the artist approached his work with considerable boldness for his time—not only did he carefully study the pose and body of Usmar's figure from life, but he also spent a long time searching for a suitable prototype of a powerful athletic hero to depict more truthfully and convincingly the legendary Russian hero, whose fantastic strength terrified the Pechenegs."

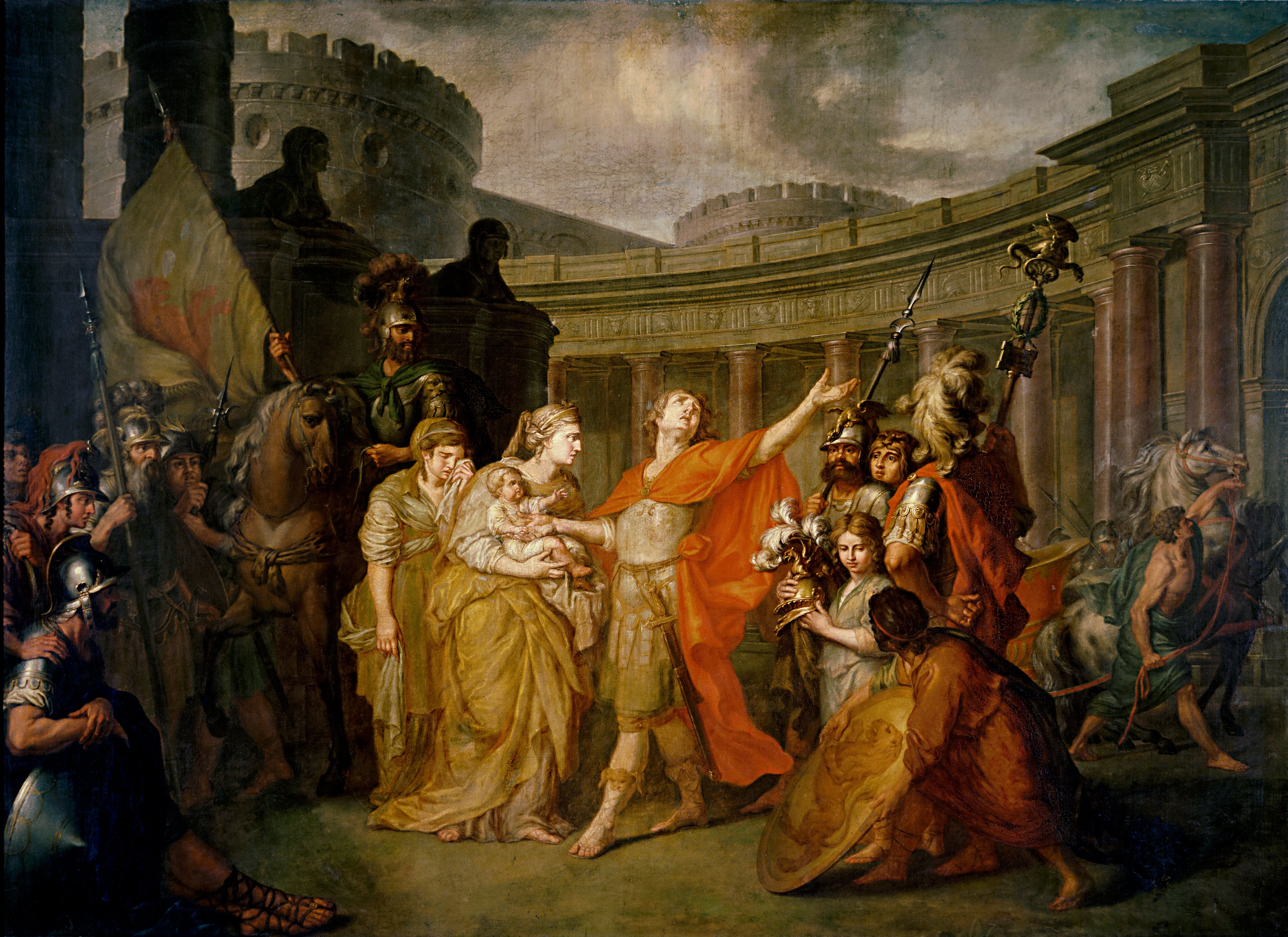
Anton Losenko. Farewell of Hector and Andromache (1773, State Tretyakov Gallery)

Art historian Alexei Savinov wrote that, among other works of Russian historical painting from the second half of the 18th century, Testing the strength of Jan Usmar "stands out for its masterful execution," continuing the tradition begun by Anton Losenko, particularly with his painting Farewell of Hector and Andromache (1773, now in the State Tretyakov Gallery). Savinov highlighted Ugryumov's successful compositional structure, combining the dynamic group of warriors on the left, Prince Vladimir on the right, and Jan Usmar with the enraged bull in the center. According to Savinov, in this work, the artist "was still far from realistically recreating the environment and appearance of a folk hero from a specific historical era," and in portraying Usmar's athletic physique, he relied significantly on examples from ancient sculpture, which was a common technique in academic painting of that time. Overall, Savinov believed that this painting demonstrated that its creator was a "talented and well-trained master."

Art historian Natalia Kovalenkaya wrote that, compared to the artist's first easel painting, Alexander Nevsky's Entry into Pskov, "Ugryumov's second painting, 'Jan Usmar' (1797, State Russian Museum), on a subject from the history of ancient Kiev, was much more successful." She noted that "for the artist, it was significant that the subject allowed him to show the strength of an ordinary warrior, which earned him the right to an honorable duel—in this was reflected an echo of the democratic currents associated with Russian Enlightenment."

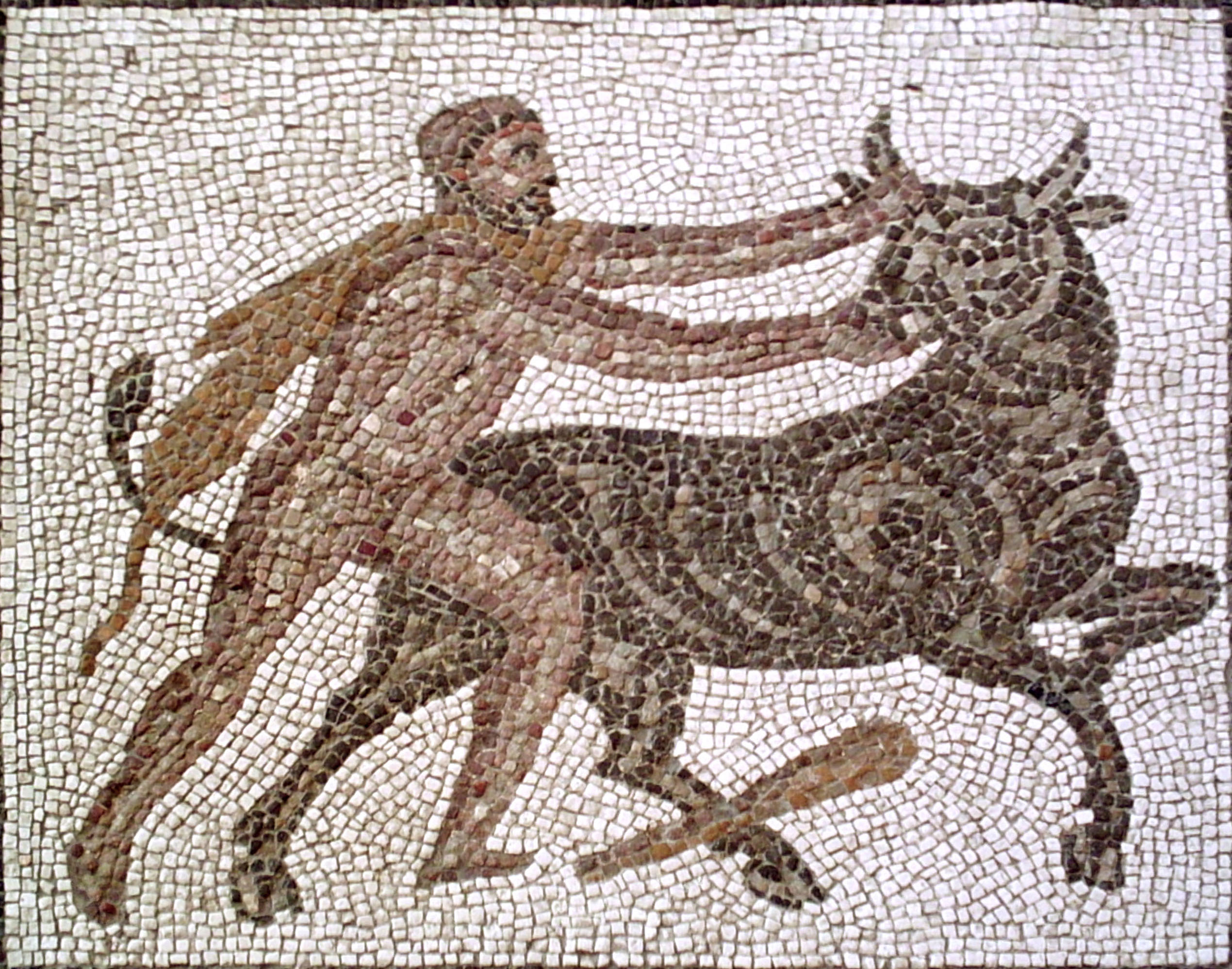
The Taming of the Cretan Bull by Heracles (fragment of a Roman mosaic from Llíria, first half of the 3rd century, National Archaeological Museum, Madrid)

In her monograph on Ugryumov, art historian Zinaida Zonova discussed the painting Testing the strength of Jan Usmar, writing that "the painting's high pathos is enhanced by its overall richness of color, vibrant painterliness, and play of light and shadow." She believed this was related to "the artist's fascination with the 'hot colors' of Rubens." Overall, according to Zonova, although Ugryumov was unable to depict the past with a sufficient degree of accuracy, he successfully used the academic framework to create a "vivid patriotic painting, instructive and exciting."

Philologist Era Kuznetsova noted that in the painting Testing the strength of Jan Usmar, in accordance with academic painting traditions, the artist placed the main event at the center of the canvas, highlighting it with both light and color. According to Kuznetsova, "'Yan Usmar' is one of Ugryumov's most expressive paintings," and "the high drama inherent in this canvas is enhanced by its rich colors, play of light and shadow, and the masterful modeling of the figures."

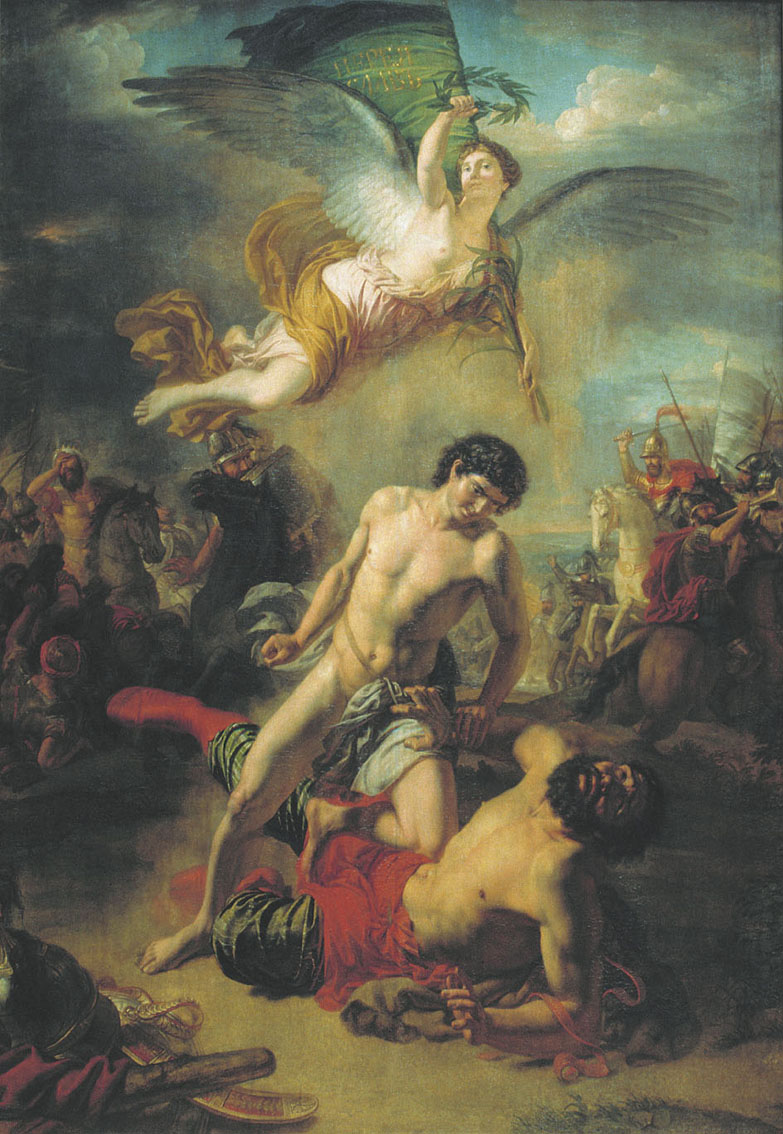
Andrey Ivanov. The Monomachy of Prince Mstislav the Daring and Prince Rededia of the Adyghes (completed by 1812, State Russian Museum).

Art historian Alla Vereshchagina considered Testing the strength of Jan Usmar to be Ugryumov's best work, despite the fact that this painting includes fewer historical and ethnographic details than some of the artist's other works. According to Vereshchagina, "the artist's evident intention to elevate the image of the main character to the level of world-renowned heroes of antiquity is noticeable"—performing a feat worthy of Heracles or Antaeus, Jan Usmar even resembles them in appearance.

In her book on Ugryumov, art historian Nonna Yakovleva wrote, "Mature skill and inspired passion distinguish 'Jan Usmar' not only among Ugryumov's works, but also place it in a special position in the history of Russian art. For perhaps the first time in Russian painting, the main character of a historical painting became a folk hero, a simple warrior-tanner." According to Yakovleva, the theme of single combat, depicted by Ugryumov through an example from national history, reappeared about a decade and a half later in the work of his student Andrey Ivanov, The Monomachy of Prince Mstislav the Daring and Prince Rededia of the Adyghes (completed by 1812, State Russian Museum).

Discussing Ugryumov's work, art historian Andrey Karev wrote that "to the greatest extent the possibilities of his skill and features of temperament were embodied in the painting 'Testing the strength of Jan Usmar'". According to Karev, "victory over the bull is a kind of symbol of victory over all enemies of Russia" and, in addition, represents "the triumph of civilisation over savagery and, ultimately, of reason over dark passions." Moreover, Karev argues that an analogy can be drawn between Usmar's test of strength and one of Heracles' labours - the taming of the Cretan Bull - since both events involved a struggle with an enraged animal. Karev also noted that Ugryumov's painting reflects the influence of the Baroque style, likely tied to the artist's aim to "find means of expression equivalent to the scene, referring both to the sphere of strong passions in general and to the circumstances of the turbulent, heroic period of domestic antiquity."

== Bibliography ==
- Bulgakov, Fyodor (1885). "Nashi zhivopistsy istoricheskiye i bytovye" Наши живописцы исторические и бытовые [Our historical and domestic painters]. Nov (in Russian). III (9): 40–65.
- Velyashev, Vl. (2007). "Surov i zhyostk stalnoy rezets..." Суров и жёстк стальной резец... [The harshness and stiffness of a steel cutter.....]. Nashe Nasledie (in Russian) (82): 76–82. Archived from the original on 2016-03-04.
- Vereshchagina, A.G. (1973). Khudozhnik. Vremya. Istoriya. Ocherki russkoy istoricheskoy zhivopisi XVIII — nachala XX veka Художник. Время. История. Очерки русской исторической живописи XVIII — начала XX века [The Artist. Time. History. Essays on Russian Historical Painting of the 18th - Early 20th Century] (in Russian). Leningrad: Iskusstvo (Leningrad Division).
- Zimenko, V.M. (1988). Orest Adamovich Kiprenskiy Орест Адамович Кипренский [Orest Adamovich Kiprensky] (in Russian). Moscow: Iskusstvo. pp. 17–18.
- Zonova, Z.T. (1952). "Grigory Ivanovich Ugryumov" Григорий Иванович Угрюмов [Grigory Ivanovich Ugryumov]. Russkoye Iskusstvo: Ocherki O Zhizni I Tvorchestve Khudozhnikov. Vosemnadtsaty Vek (in Russian). A. I. Leonov. Moscow: Iskusstvo: 373–388.
- Zonova, Z.T. (1966). Grigory Ivanovich Ugryumov, 1764—1823 Григорий Иванович Угрюмов, 1764—1823 [Grigory Ivanovich Ugryumov, 1764-1823]. Zhivopis. Skulptura. Grafika (in Russian). Moscow: Iskusstvo.
- Karev, A.A. (2003). Klassitsizm v russkoy zhivopisi Классицизм в русской живописи [Classicism in Russian Painting]. Entsiklopediya mirovogo iskusstva (in Russian). Moscow: Bely Gorod. ISBN 5-7793-0688-5.
- Kovalenskaya, N.N. (1962). Istoriya russkogo iskusstva XVIII veka История русского искусства XVIII века [History of Russian Art of the 18th Century] (in Russian). Moscow: Izdatelstvo Moskovskogo universiteta.
- Kovalenskaya, N.N. (1964). Russky klassitsizm Русский классицизм [Russian Classicism] (in Russian). Moscow: Iskusstvo.
- Kornilova, A.V.; Kornilova, V.V. (2000). "P. P. Svinyin i yego Russky muzeum" П. П. Свиньин и его Русский музеум [P.P. Svinyin and His Russian Museum]. Kraevedcheskiye Zapiski: Issledovaniya I Materialy (in Russian) (7): 61–108. ISBN 5-86585-060-1. Archived from the original on 2015-09-29.
- Kuznetsova, E.V. (1972). Besedy o russkom iskusstve XVIII — nachala XIX veka Беседы о русском искусстве XVIII — начала XIX века [Conversations about Russian Art of the 18th and Early 19th Centuries] (in Russian). Moscow: Prosveshchenie.
- Moleva, N.M. (1991). Vydayushchiesya russkie khudozhniki-pedagogi Выдающиеся русские художники-педагоги [Outstanding Russian Artist-Educators]. Biblioteka uchitelya izobrazitelnogo iskusstva (in Russian). Moscow: Prosveshcheniye.
- Olenin, Alexey (2010). Izbrannye trudy po istorii i deyatelnosti Imperatorskoy akademii khudozhestv Избранные труды по истории и деятельности Императорской академии художеств [Selected Works on the History and Activities of the Imperial Academy of Arts] (in Russian). N.S. Belyaev. Saint Petersburg: Library of the Russian Academy of Sciences. ISBN 978-5-336-00108-2.
- Petinova, E.F. (2001). Russkie khudozhniki XVIII — nachala XX veka Русские художники XVIII — начала XX века [Russian Artists of the 18th to Early 20th Centuries] (in Russian). Saint Petersburg: Aurora. ISBN 978-5-7300-0714-7.
- Petrova, E.N. (1999). "Pavel Svinyin i yego «Russky muzeum»" Павел Свиньин и его «Русский музеум» [Pavel Svinyin and His "Russian Museum"]. Stranitsy istorii otechestvennogo iskusstva. XVIII — pervaya polovina XIX veka (in Russian) (IV). Saint Petersburg: Palace Editions: 183–199.
- Romanovskiy, A.S. (2005). Akademizm v russkoy zhivopisi Академизм в русской живописи [Academism in Russian Painting]. Entsiklopediya mirovogo iskusstva (in Russian). Moscow: Bely Gorod. ISBN 5-7793-0904-3.
- Savinov, A.N. (1961). "Istoricheskaya zhivopis" Историческая живопись [Historical painting]. Istoriya russkogo iskusstva История русского искусства [History of Russian Art] (in Russian). Vol. 7. Igor Grabar, Vladimir Kemenov, Viktor Lazarev. Moscow: Nauka. pp. 162–192.
- Telyashov, R.H. (2003). Tatarskaya obshchina Sankt-Peterburga. K 300-letiyu goroda Татарская община Санкт-Петербурга. К 300-летию города [Tatar Community of Saint Petersburg: For the 300th Anniversary of the City] (in Russian). Saint Petersburg: Limbus Press. p. 394. ISBN 9785859910601.
- Yakovleva, N.A. (1982). Grigory Ivanovich Ugryumov Григорий Иванович Угрюмов [Grigory Ivanovich Ugryumov]. Massovaya biblioteka po iskusstvu (in Russian). Leningrad: Khudozhnik RSFSR.
- Yakovleva, N.A. (2005). Istoricheskaya kartina v russkoy zhivopisi Историческая картина в русской живописи [Historical Painting in Russian Art]. Entsiklopediya mirovogo iskusstva (in Russian). Moscow: Bely Gorod. ISBN 5-7793-0898-5.
- Gosudarstvennaya Tretyakovskaya galereya — katalog sobraniya Государственная Третьяковская галерея — каталог собрания [State Tretyakov Gallery — catalog of the collection] (in Russian). Vol. 2: Zhivopis XVIII veka. Y. V. Brook, L. I. Iovleva. Moscow. 2015. ISBN 978-5-89580-070-6.
- Gosudarstvennaya Tretyakovskaya galereya — katalog sobraniya Государственная Третьяковская галерея — каталог собрания [State Tretyakov Gallery - catalogue of the collection] (in Russian). Vol. 3: Zhivopis pervoy poloviny XIX veka. Y.V. Brooke, L.I. Iovleva. Moscow: SkanRus. 2005. ISBN 5-93221-081-8.
- Gosudarstvenny Russky muzey. Katalog-putevoditel. Russkaya zhivopis XVIII—XIX vekov Государственный Русский музей. Каталог-путеводитель. Русская живопись XVIII—XIX веков [State Russian Museum. Catalogue-guide. Russian painting of the 18th-19th centuries] (in Russian). А.N. Savinov, G.V. Smirnov, V.N. Petrov, G.E. Lebedev. Leningrad: State Russian Museum. 1948.
- Gosudarstvenny Russky muzey — Zhivopis, XVIII — nachalo XX veka (katalog) Государственный Русский музей — Живопись, XVIII — начало XX века (каталог) [State Russian Museum - Painting, 18th - early 20th century (catalogue)] (in Russian). А.V. Gubarev, N.N. Novouspensky, V.A. Pushkaryov, G.V. Smirnov. Leningrad: Aurora, Iskusstvo. 1980.
- Gosudarstvenny Russky muzey — katalog sobraniya Государственный Русский музей — каталог собрания [State Russian Museum - catalogue of the collection] (in Russian). Vol. 1: Zhivopis XVIII veka. G.N. Goldovsky. Saint Petersburg: Palace Editions. 1998.
- Gosudarstvenny Russky muzey — katalog sobraniya Государственный Русский музей — каталог собрания [State Russian Museum - catalogue of the collection] (in Russian). Vol. 2: Zhivopis pervoy poloviny XIX veka (A—I). G.N. Goldovsky. Saint Peterburg: Palace Editions. 2002.
- Imperatorskaya Akademiya khudozhestv. Muzey. Russkaya zhivopis Императорская Академия художеств. Музей. Русская живопись [The Imperial Academy of Arts. Museum. Russian painting] (in Russian). S.K. Isakov. Petrograd: Union. 1915.
- Povest vremennykh let Повесть временных лет [Tale of Bygone Years] (in Russian). Moscow: Institut russkoy tsivilizatsii. 1993. pp. 143–144.
