= Gabriel François Doyen =

French painter (1726–1806)

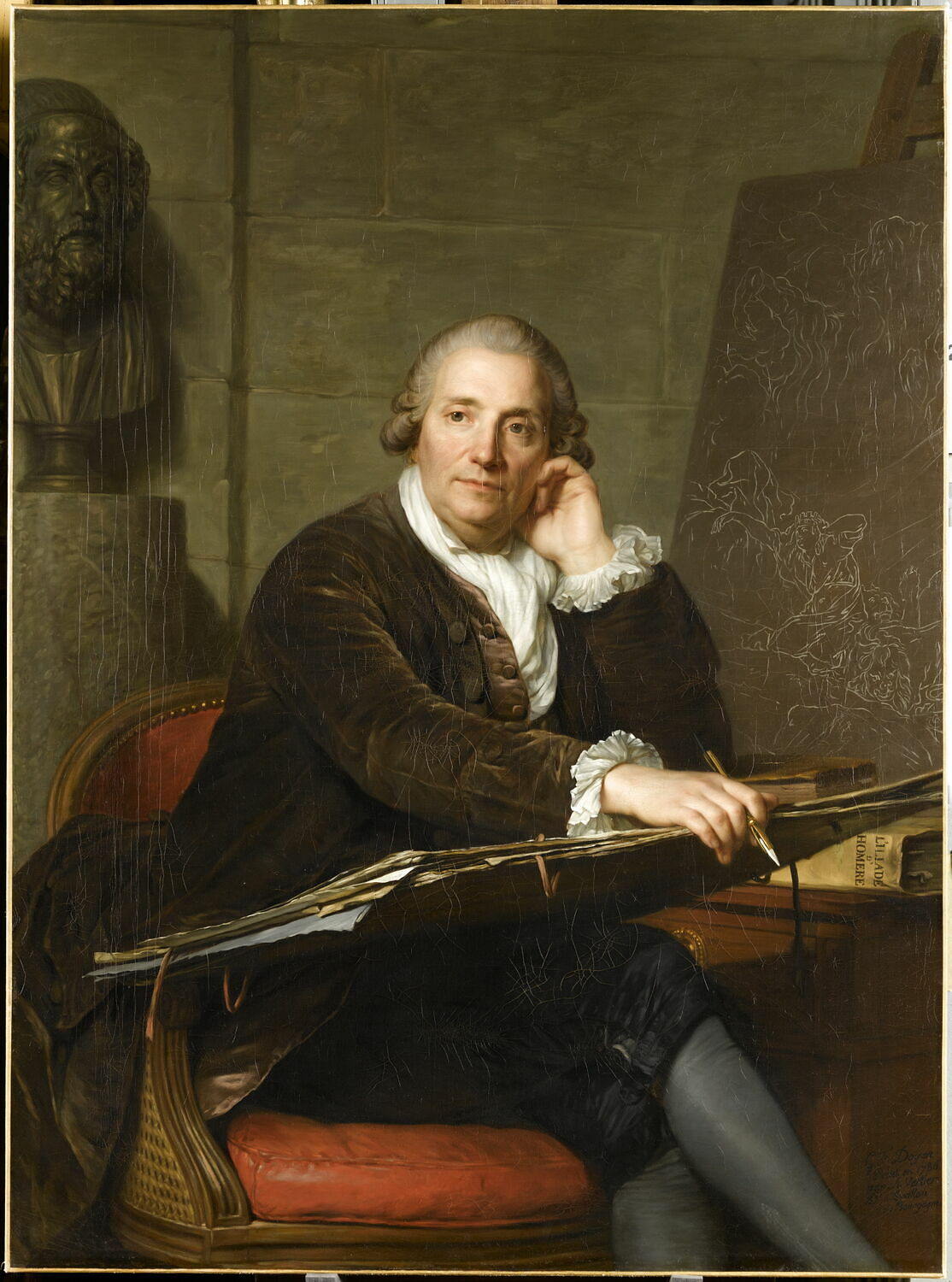
Gabriel François Doyen; portrait by Antoine Vestier (1786)

Gabriel François Doyen (French: [gabʁjɛl fʁɑ̃swa dwajɑ̃]; 20 May 1726 – 13 March 1806) was a French painter of historical and mythological scenes.

== Biography ==
Doyen was born in Paris. His father, a royal upholsterer, initially opposed his wishes to become an artist but, at the age of twelve, he began taking lessons from Charles-André van Loo. Making rapid progress, he obtained the Grand Prix de Rome at the age of twenty. In 1748, he set out for Italy and, in 1752, became associated with the Academy of France in Rome. Later, he travelled throughout Italy, studying the works of Domenichino, Annibale Carracci, Pietro Berrettini da Cortona, Giulio Romano and Michelangelo. While in Venice, he was greatly influenced by the work of the famous colourists, such as Titian.

In 1755 returned to Paris and, at first unappreciated and disparaged, he resolved by one grand effort to achieve a reputation, and in 1758 he exhibited his Death of Virginia. It was completely successful and, in 1761, it procured him admission to the Académie Royale de Peinture et de Sculpture.

Doyen was also influenced by Peter Paul Rubens, after a visit to Antwerp. This influence is, perhaps, best displayed in his Le Miracle des ardents, painted for the Church of St. Roch (1767). This painting was exhibited in the Salon of 1767, which was recorded by Saint-Aubin in his "View of the salon of 1767'". Art historian Michael Levey described this painting as the 'high point' in the artist's career, suggesting the drama of the piece may be a precursor to that which characterises the French Romantic painting of the 19th century. He notes how the writhing figures of the foreground are similar to those found in The Raft of the Medusa by Théodore Géricault.

In 1773 Doyen painted his The Last Communion of St Louis for the high altar of the chapel at the École Militaire; it is strongly reminiscent of The Last Communion of St Jerome by Domenichino and displays a sharp clarity of message, required by its position far above the high altar. Another notable work of this period in Doyen's life is the Triumph of Thetis for the chapel of the Invalides. In 1776 he was appointed professor at the academy. By the middle of the 1780s, his style was going out of fashion.

During the initial stages of the French Revolution he became active in the national museum project and created an art depository at the Petit Augustin. In 1792, however, he left France for Russia on the invitation of Catherine II. He settled in St Petersburg, where he was admitted to the Imperial Academy of Arts and helped decorate several palaces. His students included Andrey Ivanov. He died there in 1806.

== Selected paintings ==
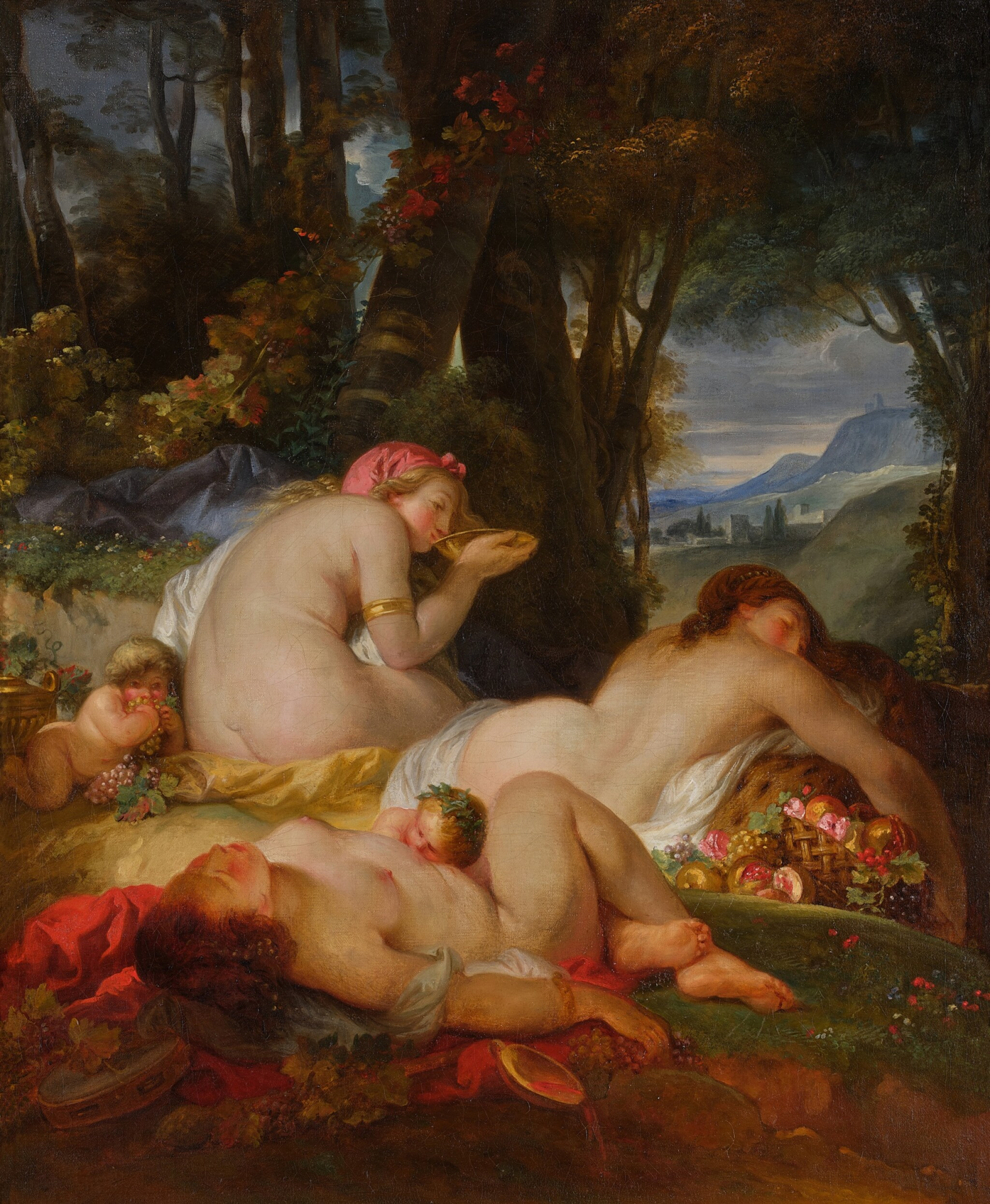
Sleeping Bacchantes (c.1782)

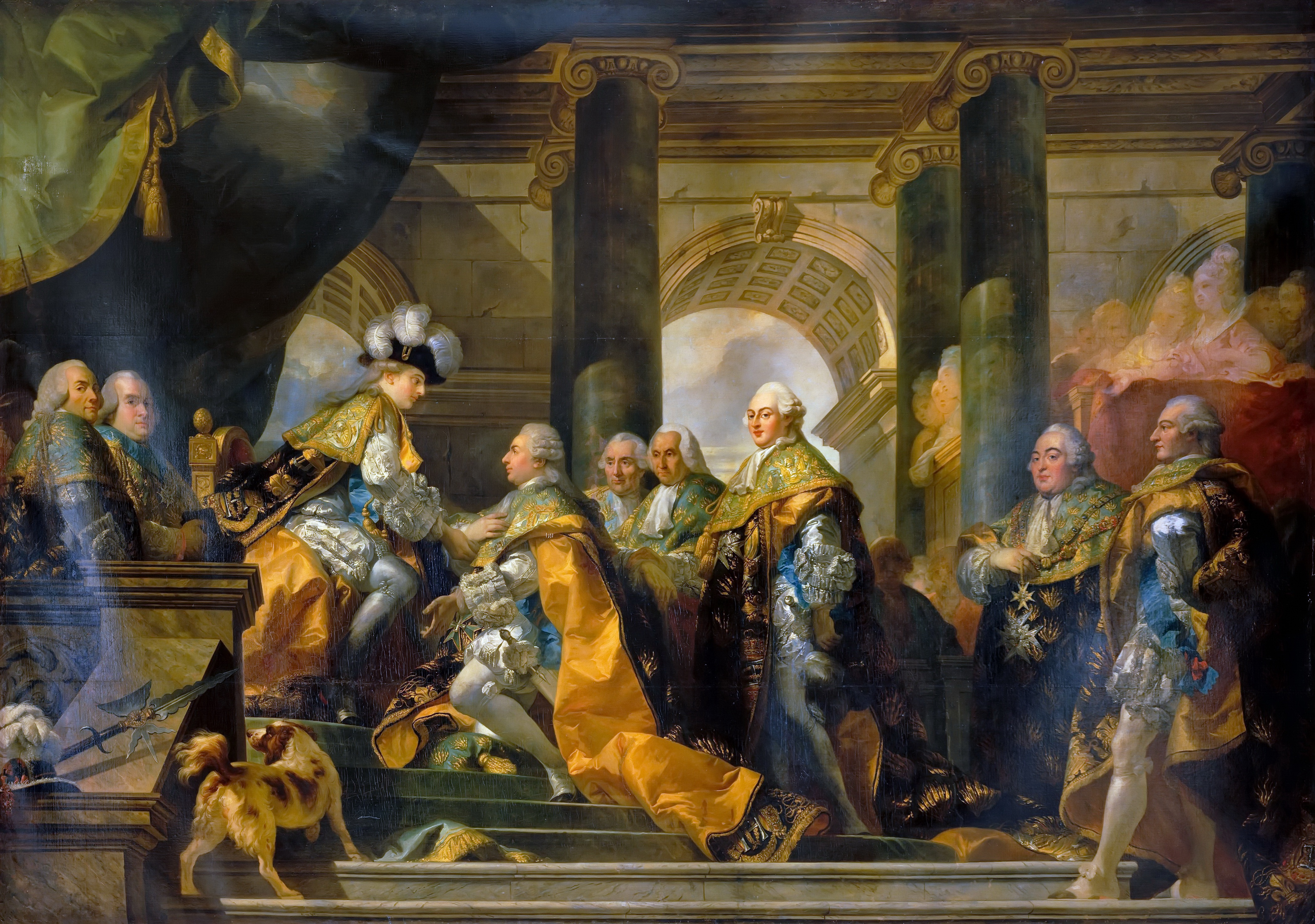
Louis XVI Receives Homage from the Knights of the Holy Spirit in Reims (c.1775)

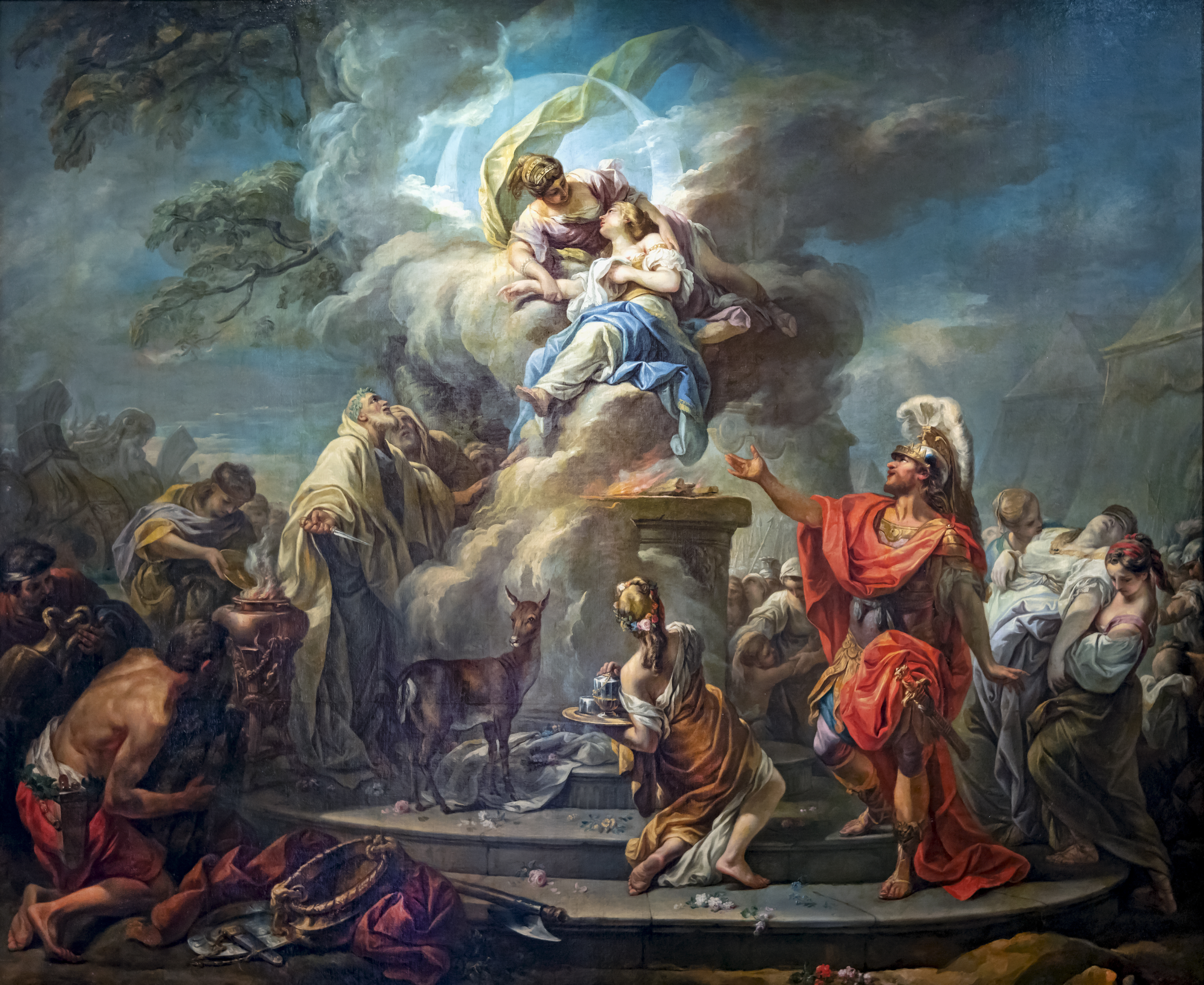
The Sacrifice of Iphigenia (1749)

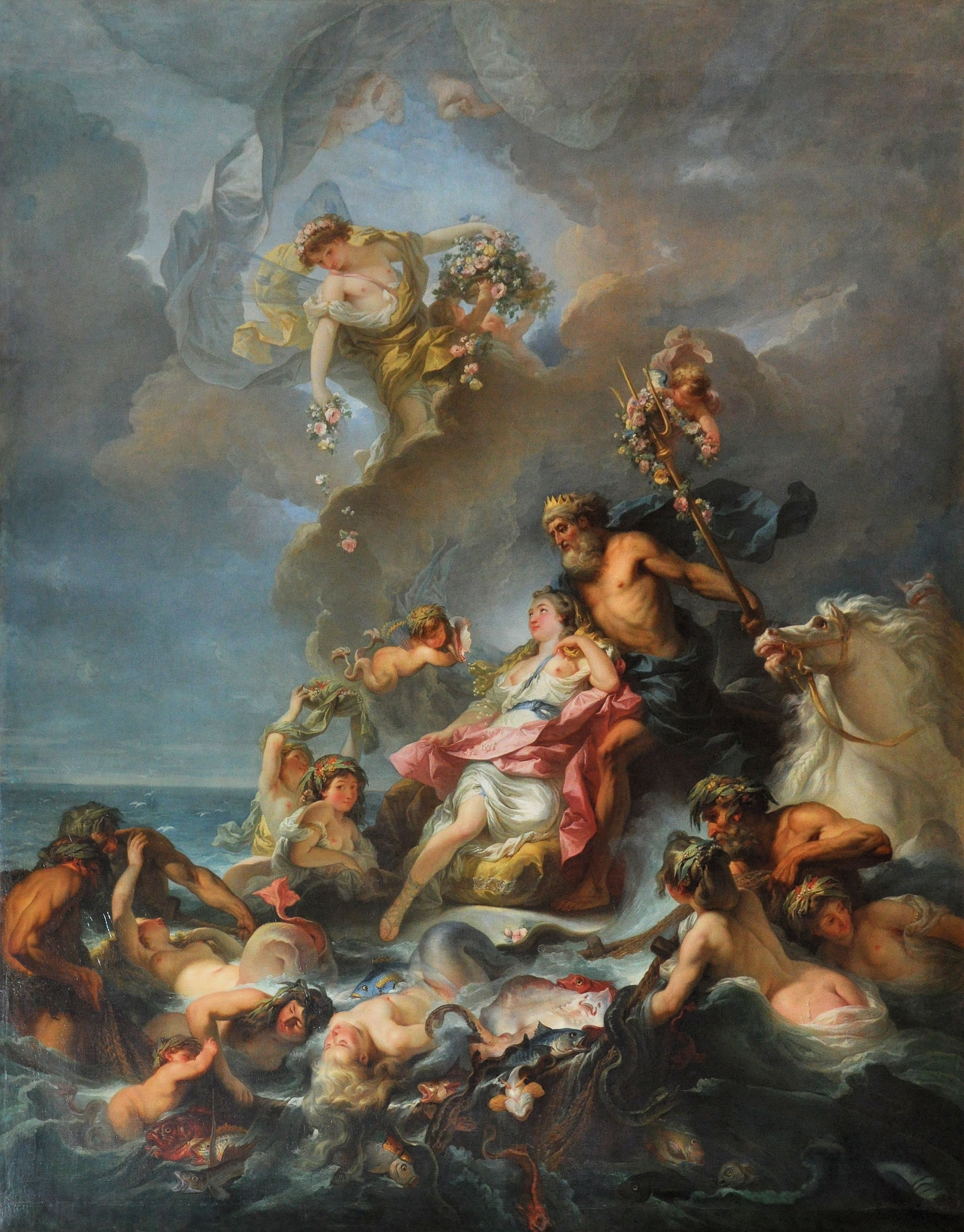
The Triumph of Amphitrite (1768)

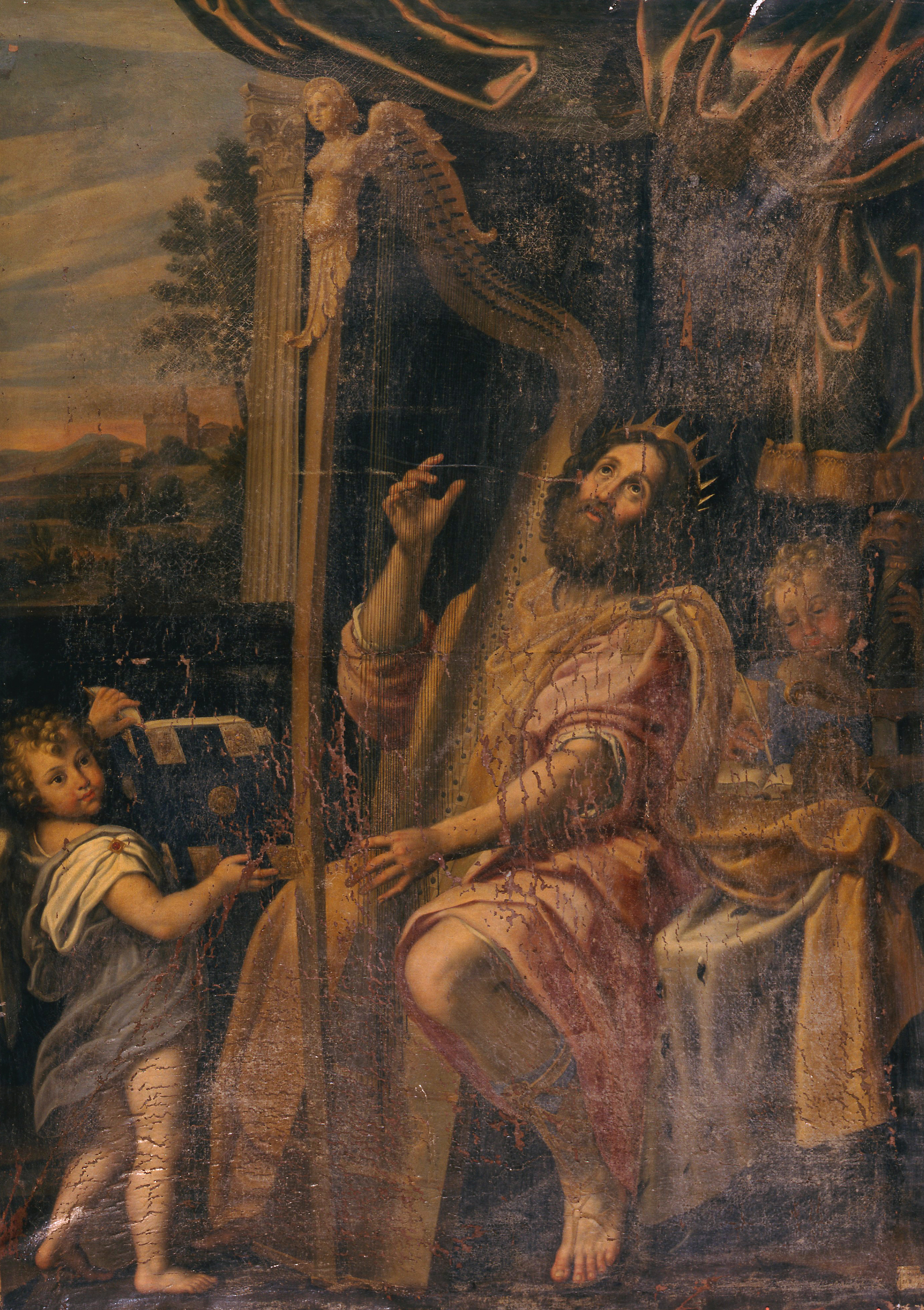
King David playing the harp
