= Grigory Ugryumov =

Russian painter (1764–1823)

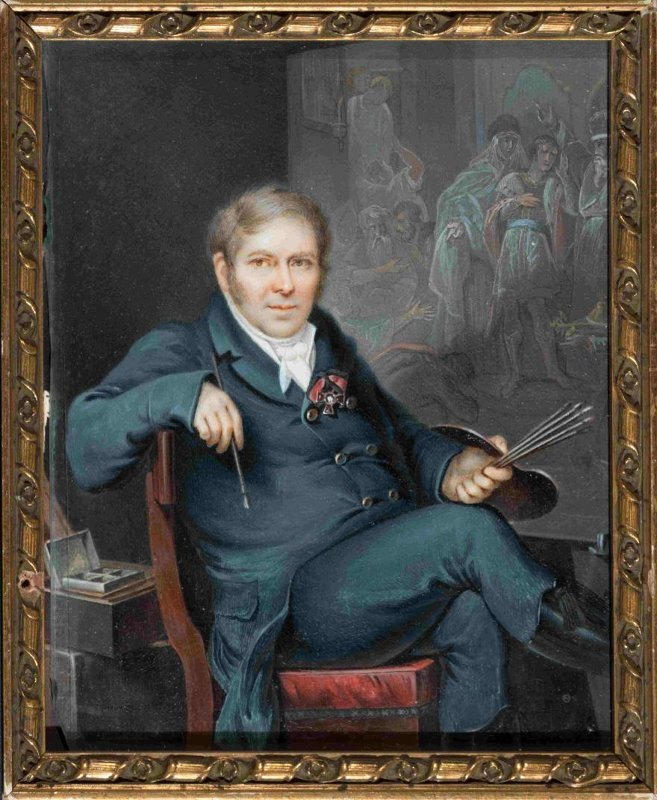
- Portrait miniature by Aleksandr Golovachevsky, 1814; Russian Museum, St. Petersburg
- Born: 30 April 1764; Moscow
- Died: 16 March 1823 (aged 58); Saint Petersburg
- Resting place: Smolensky Cemetery, St. Petersburg
- Education: Member Academy of Arts (1797)
- Alma mater: Imperial Academy of Arts (1785)
- Known for: Painting
- Style: Classicism

Grigory Ivanovich Ugryumov (Russian: Григорий Иванович Угрюмов; 11 May 1764 in Moscow – 28 March 1823 in Saint Petersburg) was a Russian portrait and history painter in the Classical style.

== Biography ==
He was born to merchant who was originally from Yaroslavl Oblast. In 1770, he was enrolled in the elementary classes at the Imperial Academy of Arts and later studied under Ivan Akimov. He graduated in 1785 and was awarded a gold medal for his painting of Hagar and Ishmael in the desert. In 1787, he received a fellowship to study in Italy, where he made drawings of the statues, especially those of Paolo Veronese and Guido Reni. Upon his return, he became a teacher of history painting at the academy.

In 1794, he became a Candidate Academician and was awarded the title in 1797 for his painting of the legendary 10th century hero Jan Usmar. By 1800, he was a Professor and sat on the board of the academy. In 1820, he became the Rector of History Painting.

He won the favor of Catherine the Great and her successors, executing large works at the Trinity Cathedral of Alexander Nevsky Monastery, Saint Michael's Castle, Kazan Cathedral and the church of the Finland Guard Regiment. He was also well known for his portraits of notable people outside of the nobility.

His students included many names that would become familiar, such as Andrey Ivanovich Ivanov, Vasily Shebuyev, Alexei Yegorov and Orest Kiprensky.

== Selected paintings ==
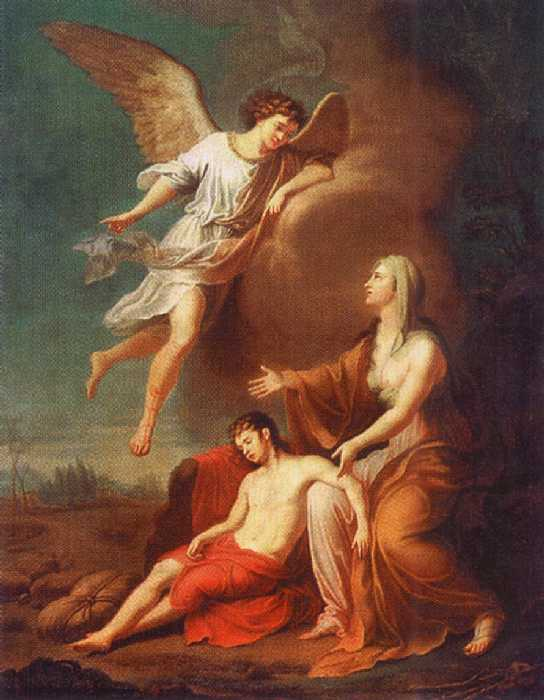
Hagar and Ishmael in the Desert (1785)

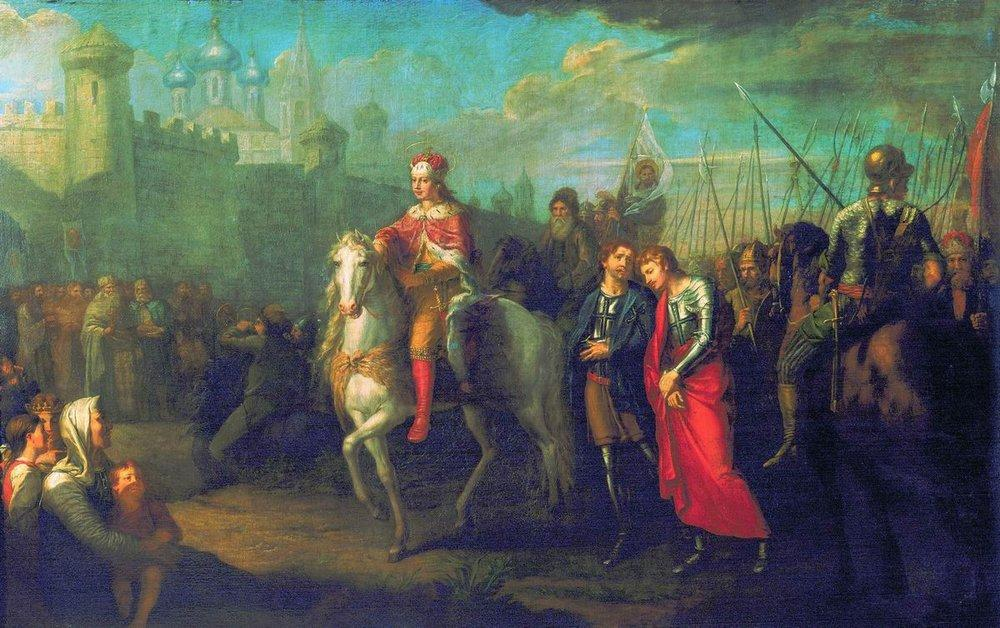
Alexander Nevsky in Pskov after his victory over the Germans (1793)

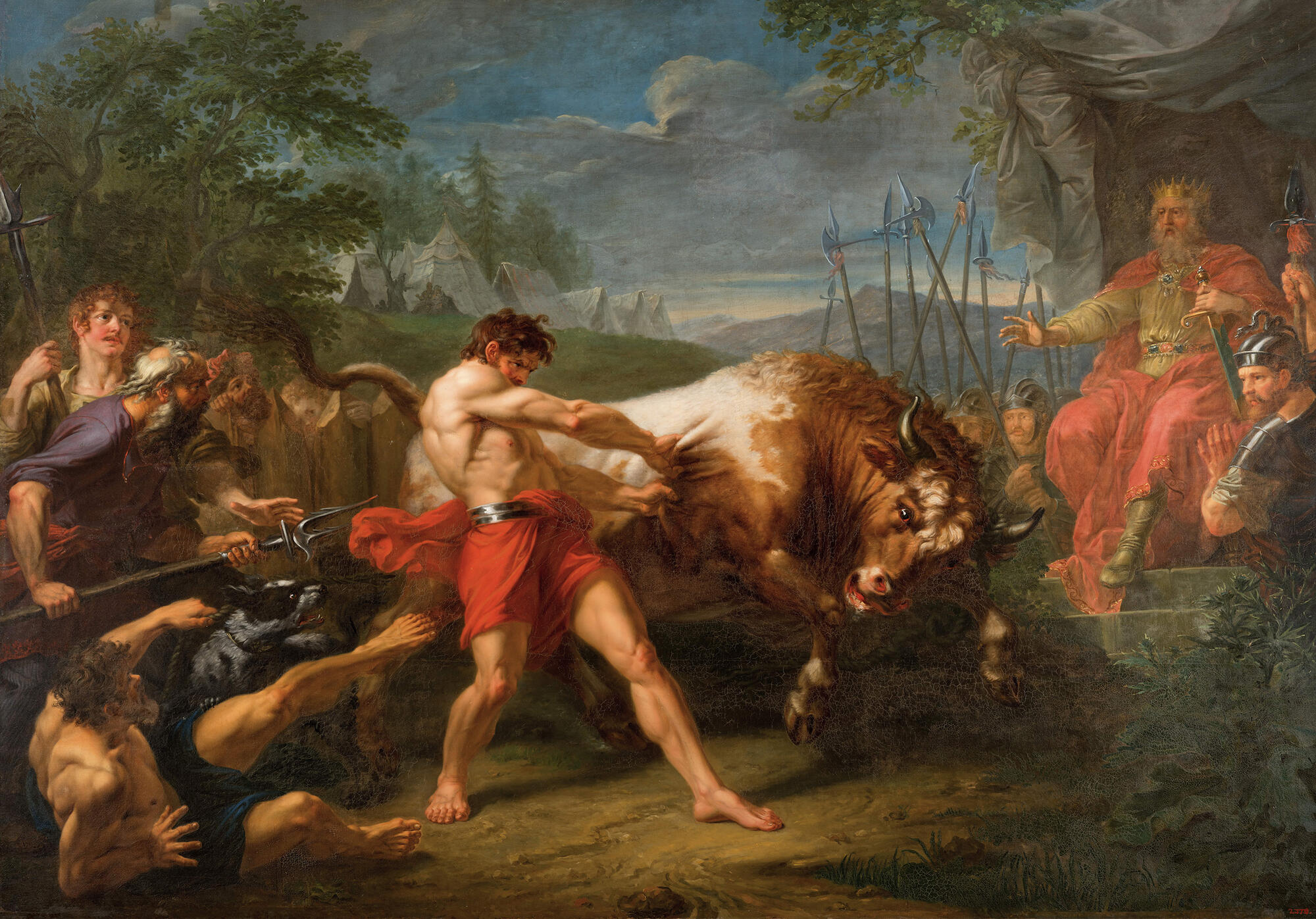
Testing the strength of Jan Usmar (1796–1797)

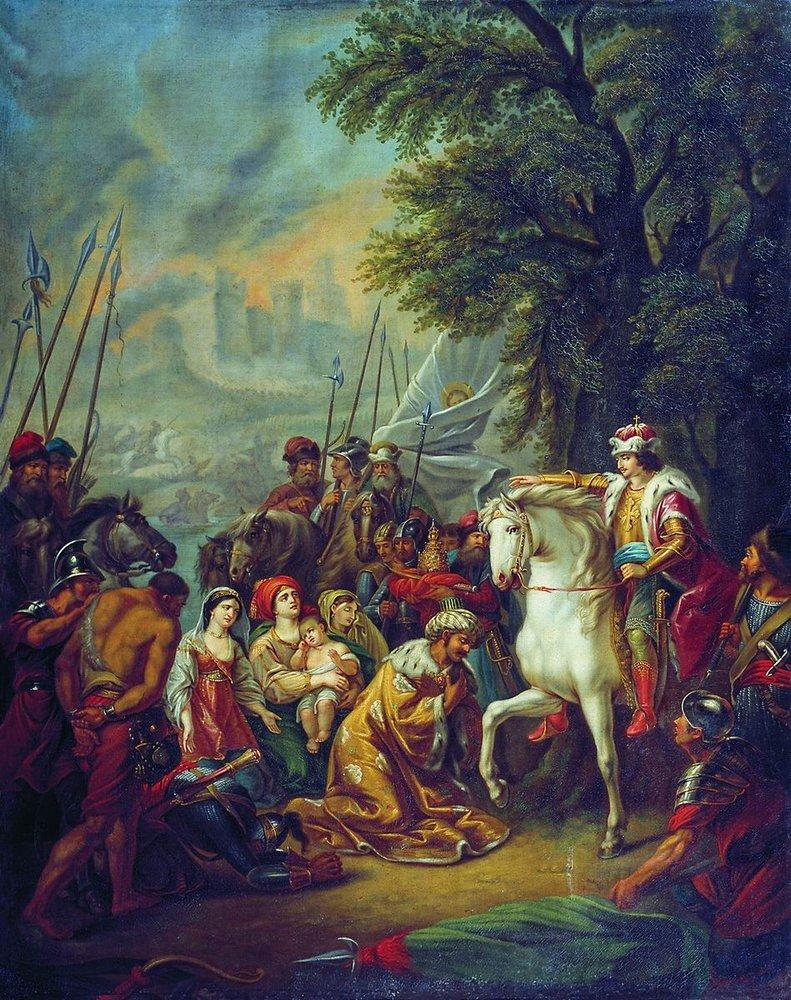
Capture of Kazan by Ivan the Terrible (c.1800)
