= Andrey Ivanov (painter) =

Russian painter (1775–1848)

- Андрей Иванович Ива́нов
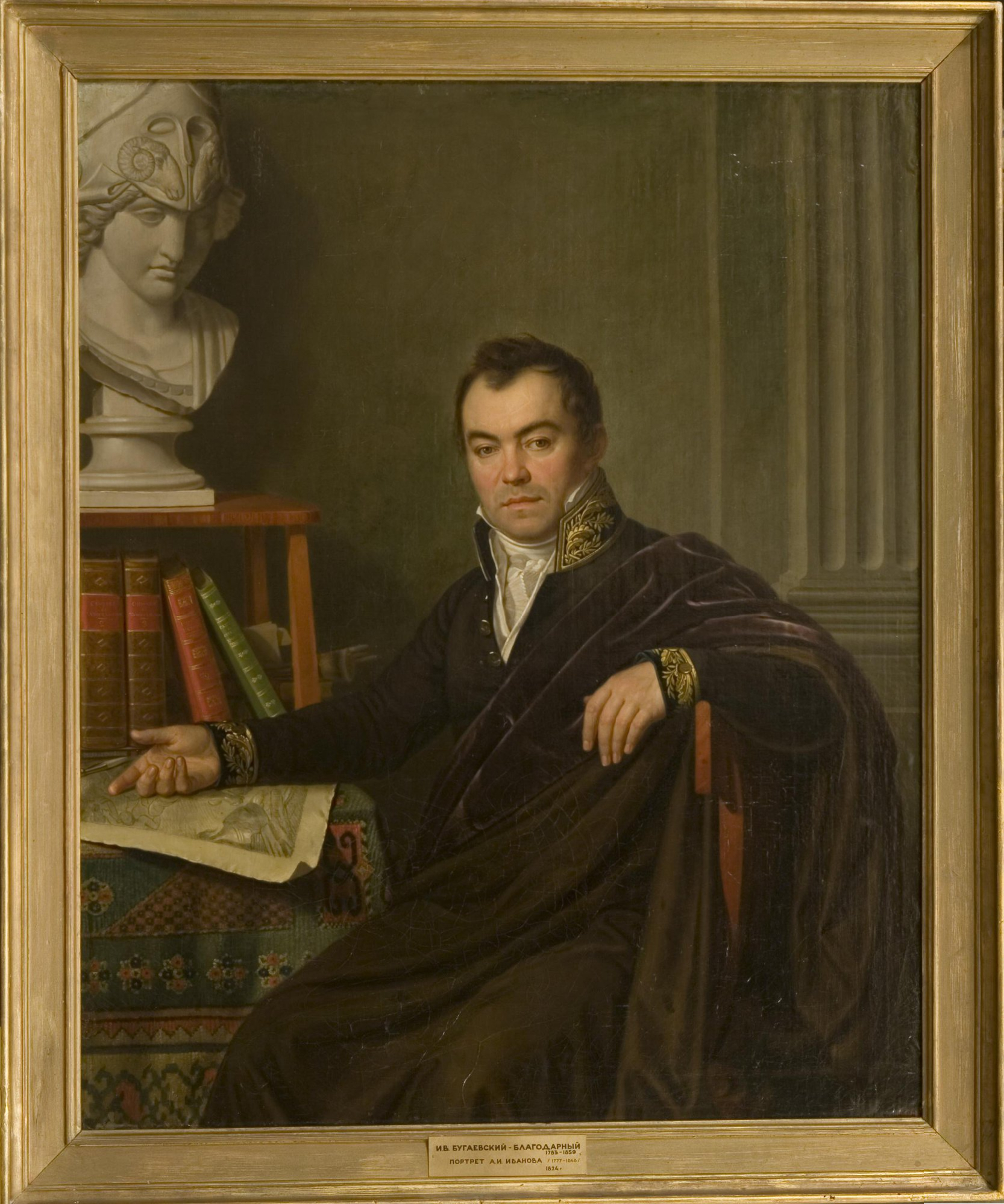
- Portrait by Ivan Bugayevsky-Blagodarny, 1824, oils; Museum of the Academy of Arts, St. Petersburg
- Born: 1775; Moscow
- Died: July 12, 1848 (aged 72–73); St. Petersburg
- Resting place: Smolensky Cemetery, St. Petersburg
- Education: Grigory Ugryumov; Gabriel François Doyen
- Known for: History painting
- Spouse: Yekaterina Dimmert (m. 1800; died 1843)
- Children: 10, including Alexander
- Awards: Big Gold Medal of the Imperial Academy of Arts (1797)
- Elected: Member Academy of Arts (1803); Professor by rank (1812)

Andrey Ivanovich Ivanov (Russian: Андре́й Ива́нович Ива́нов; 1775, Moscow - 24 July 1848, Saint Petersburg) was a Russian painter in the Neo-Classical style, active in St. Petersburg during Tsars Alexander I and Nicholas I's reigns, best known for his history pictures.

== Biography ==
He was abandoned by his parents and was raised at the Moscow Orphanage. He was enrolled in the elementary courses at the Imperial Academy of Arts in 1782, and later studied with Grigory Ugryumov and Gabriel François Doyen, graduating in 1797. He began teaching there in 1798 and became an Academician in 1803. During this time, he was engaged in copying the old Italian masters and painting icons. In 1812 he was appointed a Professor for his painting of Prince Mstislav the Brave and the defeat of Rededya. In 1820, he painted the fresco "Minerva Hovering in the Sky" for the iron staircase at the Academy.

His painting based on the episode from the Napoleonic Wars, The Death of General Kulnev, angered Tsar Nicholas I when it was exhibited in 1830, apparently because it portrayed a controversial (and almost certainly apocryphal) moment from the incident; Kulnev's order to his allied officers to remove their insignia so the enemy wouldn't know that the Russian army was without a commander. As a result, Ivanov was removed from the Academy, on the Tsar's insistence. A few years later, when Karl Bryullov returned to Russia and was presented with a laurel wreath, he took it off his head and placed it on Ivanov's instead, as a sign of respect and appreciation.

Despite his forced retirement, Ivanov remained active as a painter and member of several artistic societies. He died of cholera. The Ivanovs' burial, in the Smolensky Cemetery, seems to be lost by the 1850s. His son was the painter Alexander Andreyevich Ivanov.

== Selected works ==
Narrative paintings

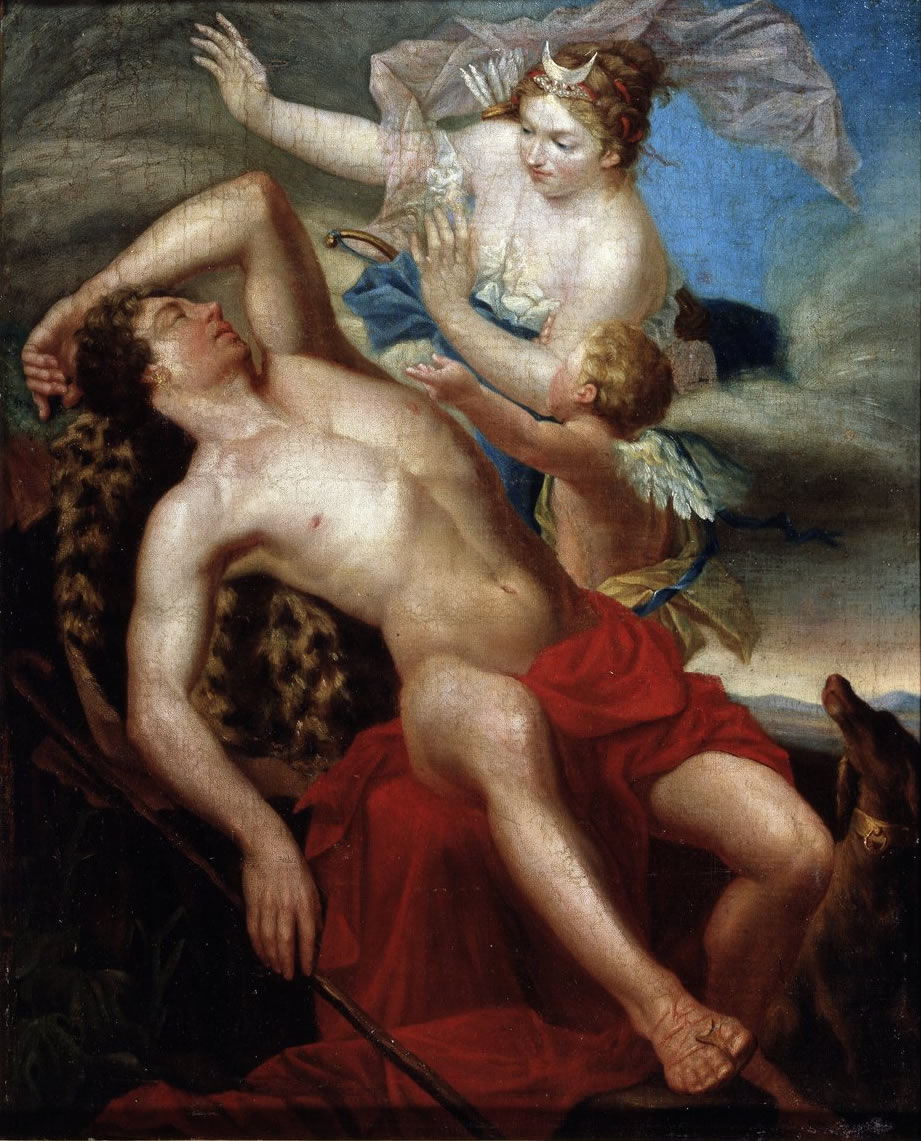
Selene and Endymion, 1797; Picture Gallery, Pskov

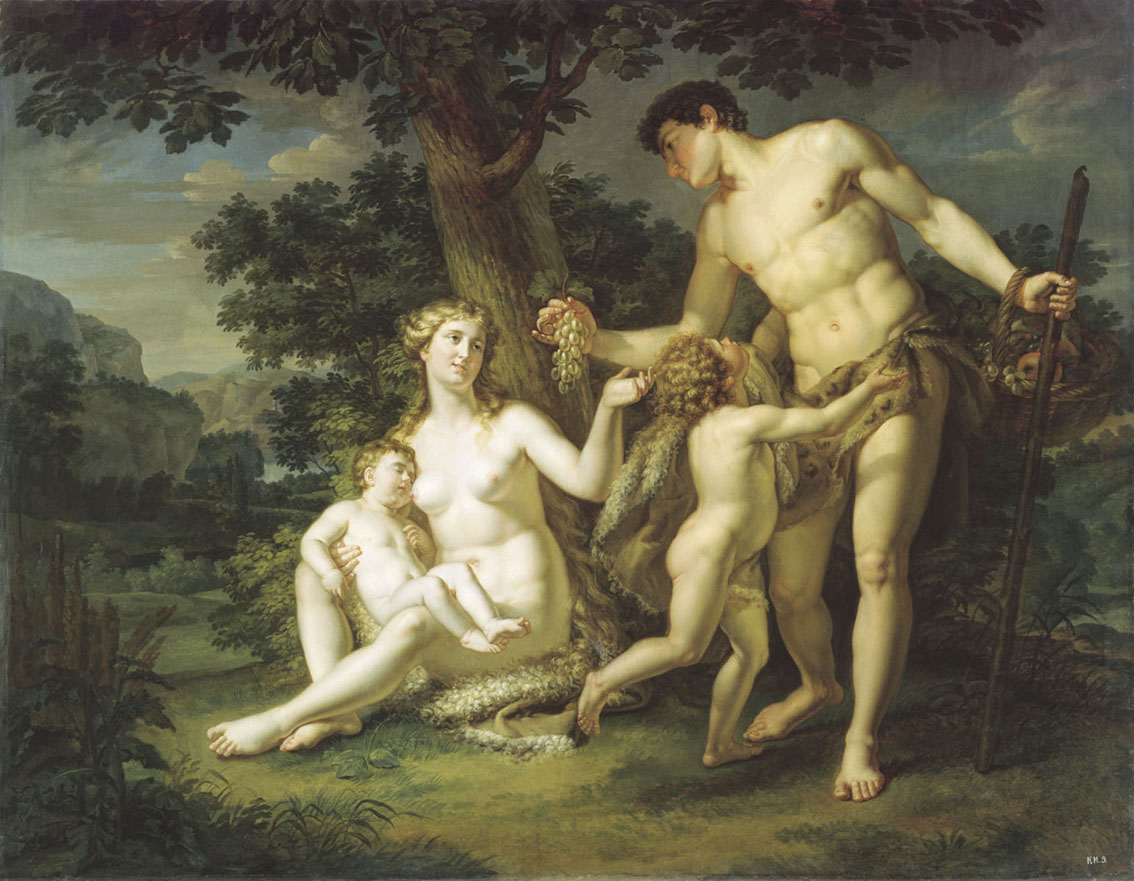
Adam and Eve with Their Children, 1803; Russian Museum

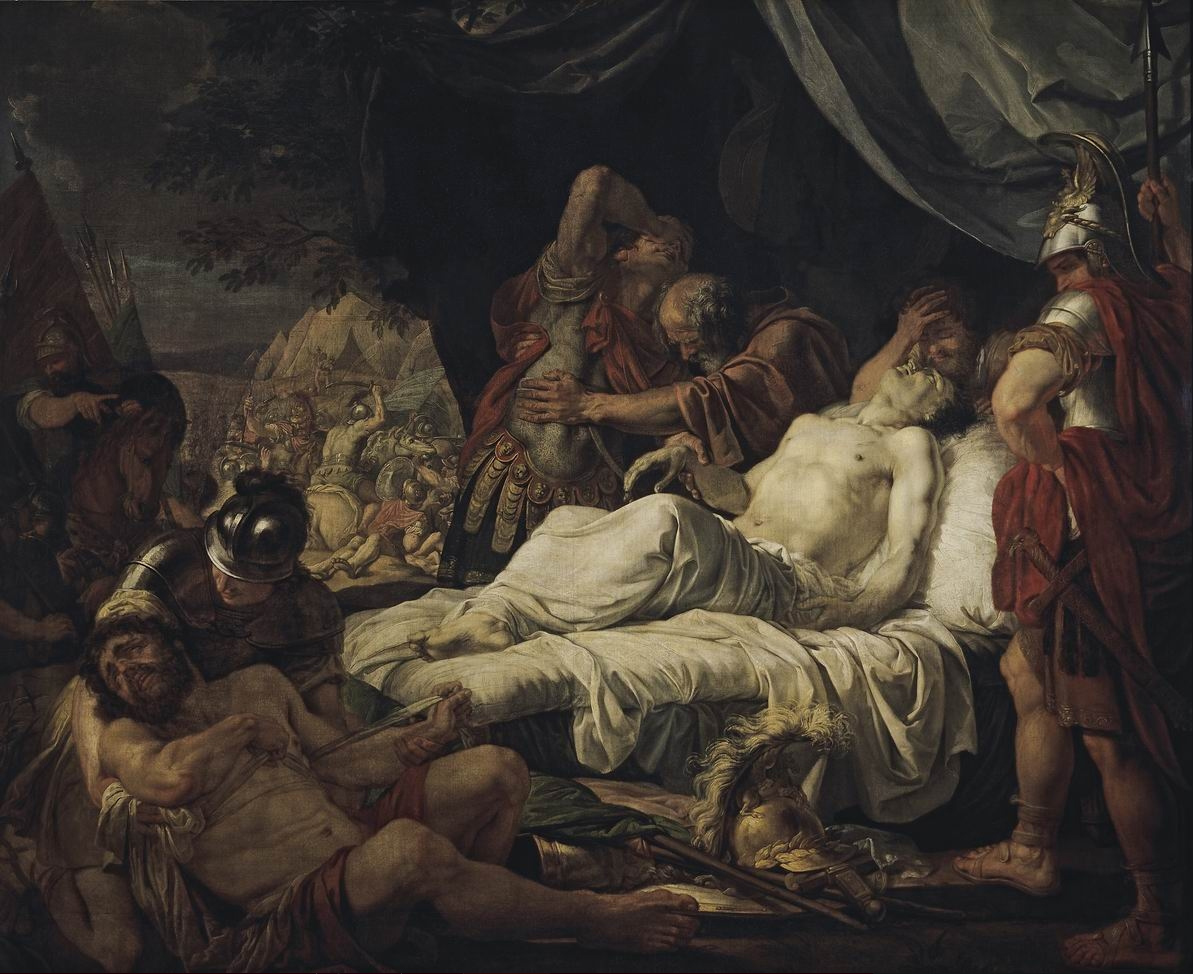
Death of Pelopidas, c. 1805–1806; Tretyakov Gallery

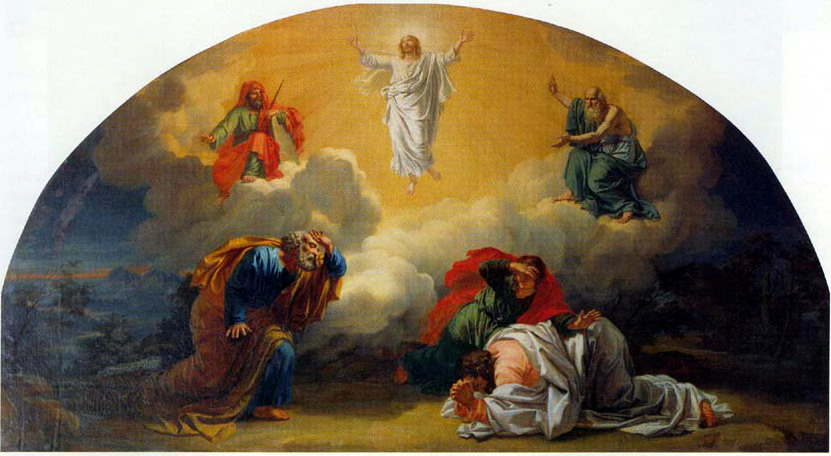
Transfiguration of Jesus, c. 1807–1809; Museum of the History of Religion, St. Petersburg, originally from Kazan Cathedral

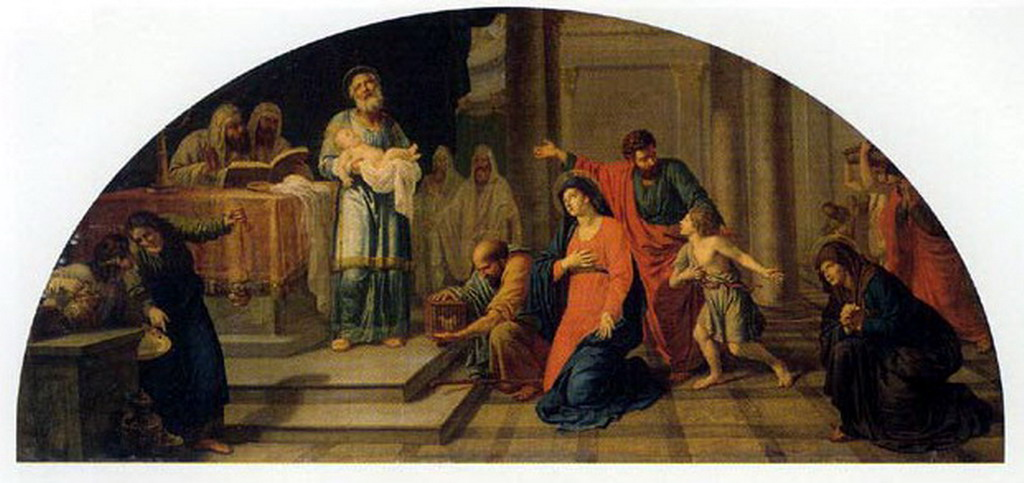
Presentation of Jesus, 1800s; Russian Museum, originally from Kazan Cathedral

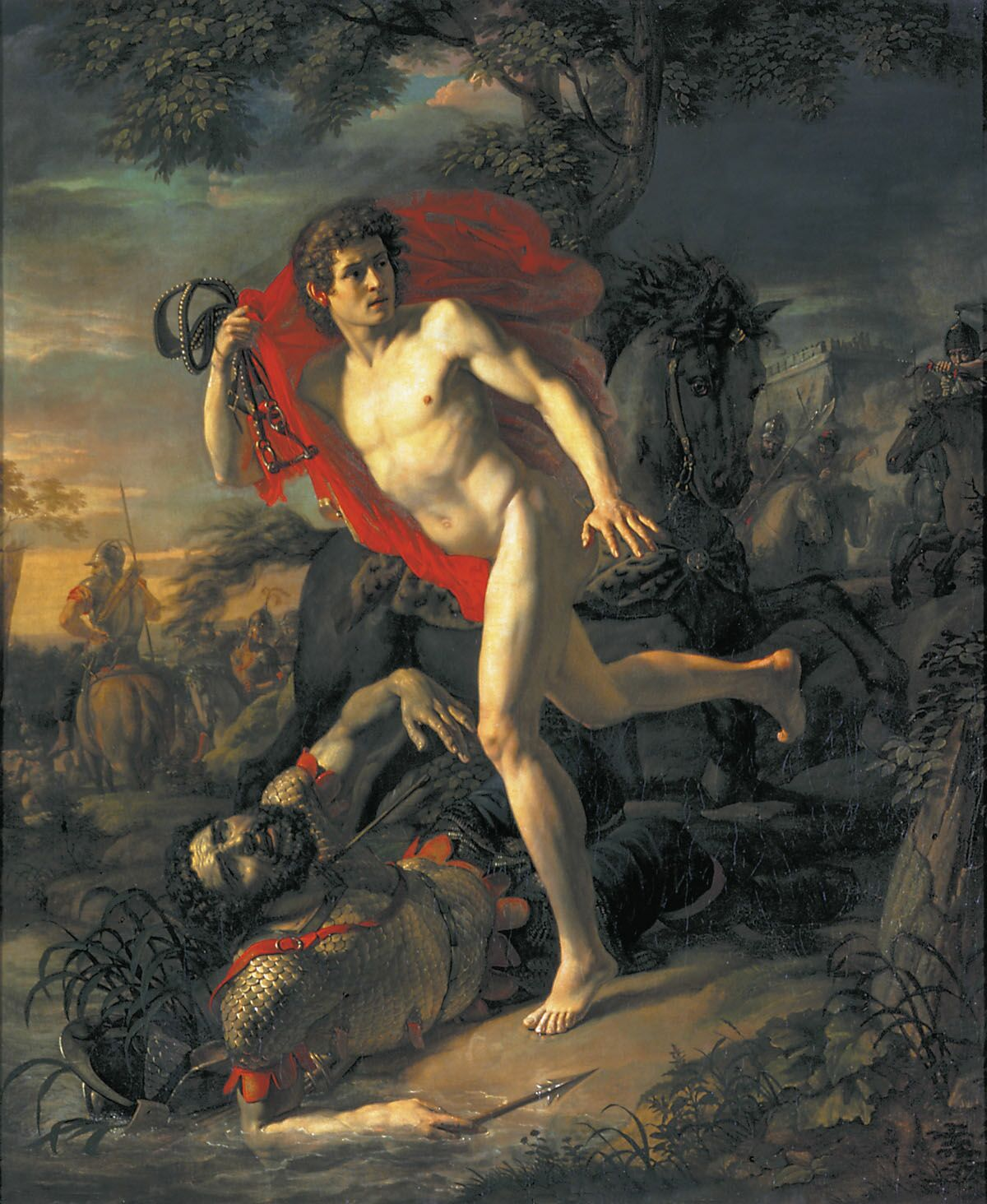
The Exploit of a Kievan Boy, 1810; Russian Museum

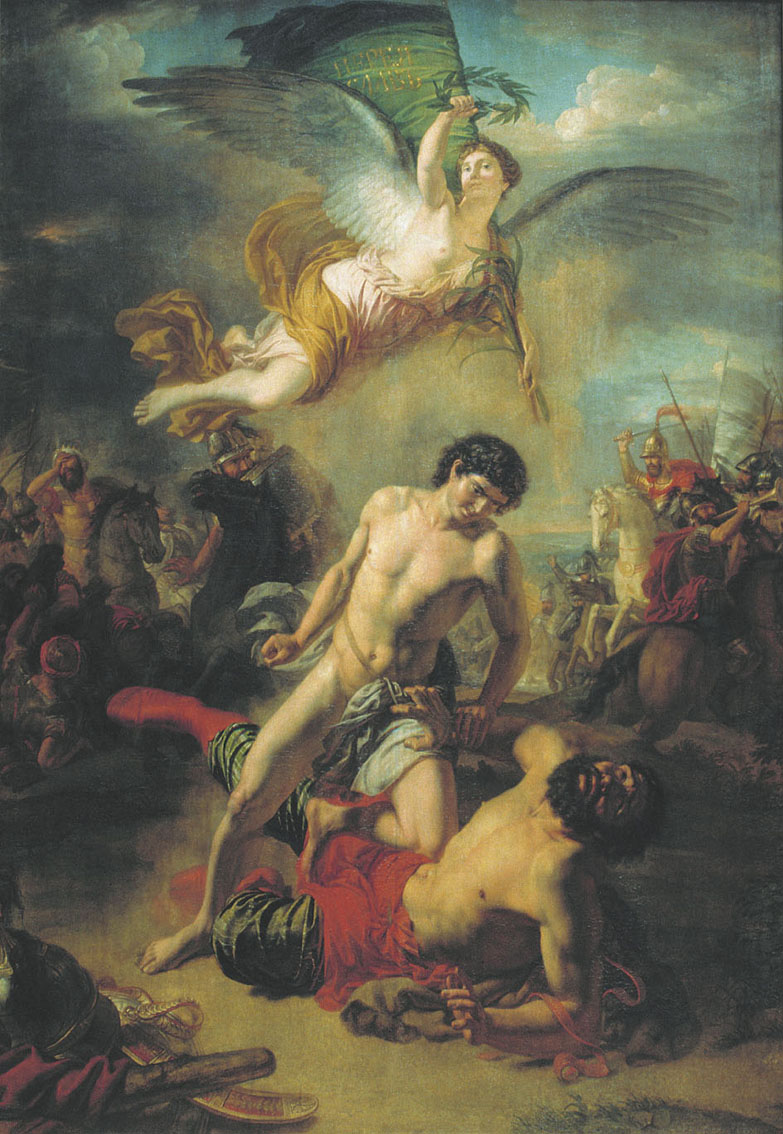
Prince Mstislav of Chernigov Defeats Prince Rededya, 1812; Russian Museum

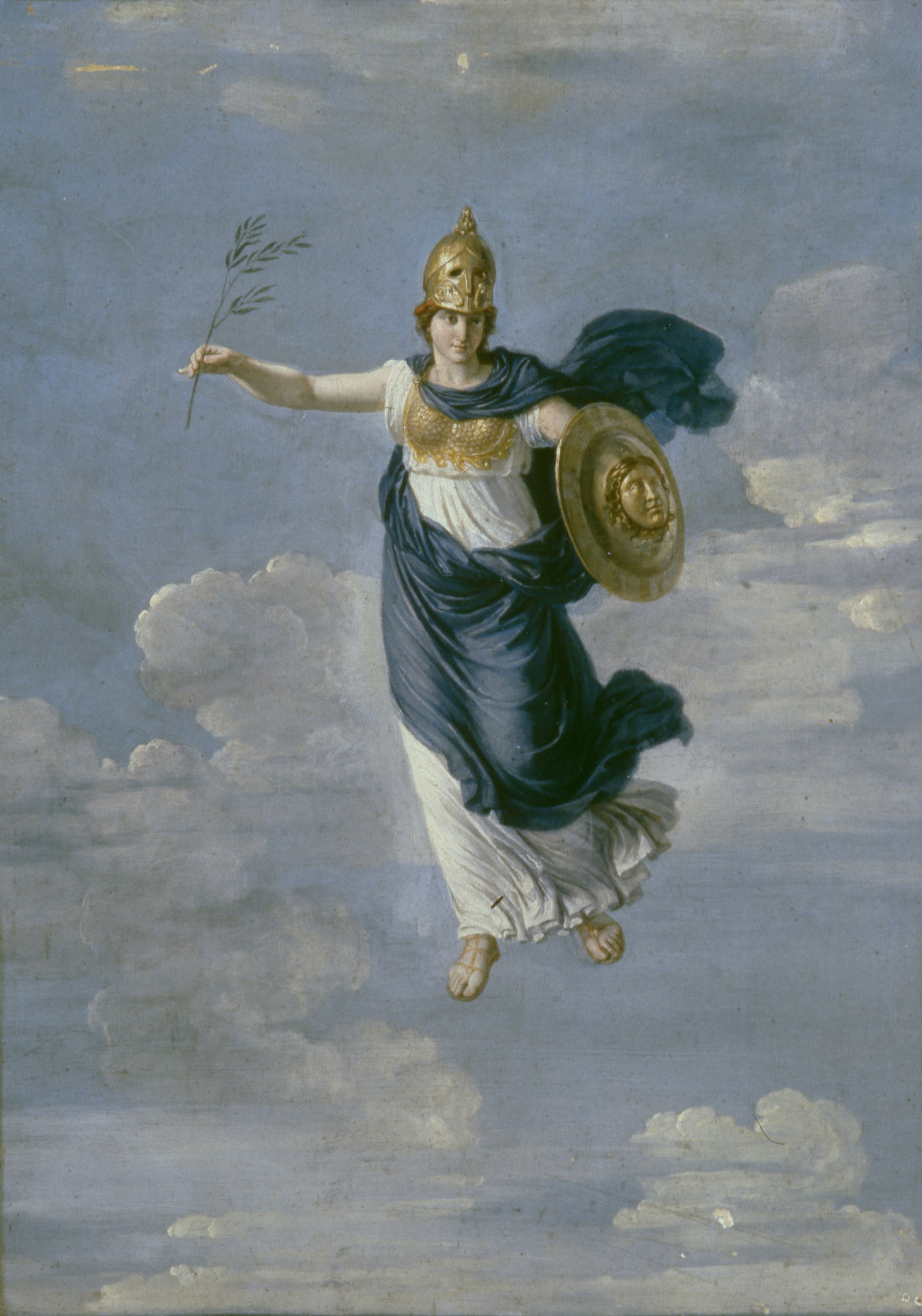
Minerva in the Heavens, sketch for a fresco in the Imperial Academy of Arts building, c. 1819–1820; Russian Museum

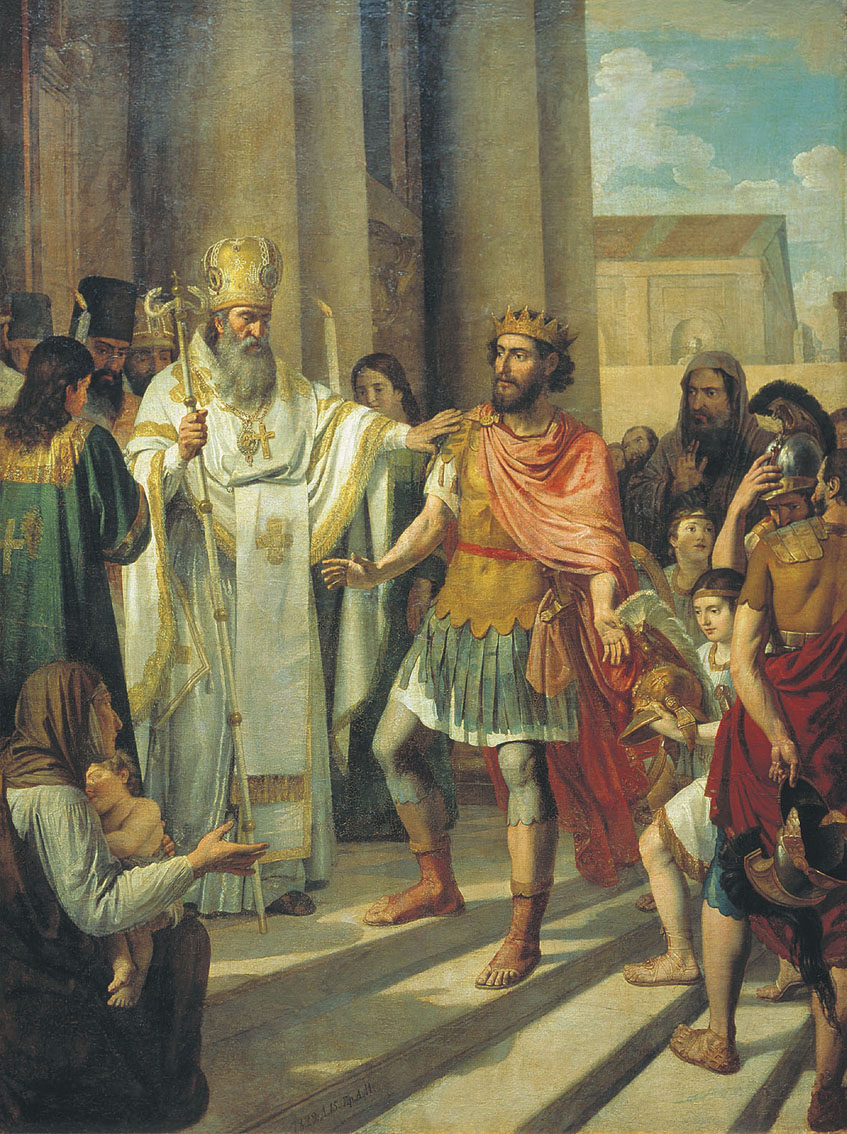
St. Ambrose Barring Theodosius from Milan Cathedral, 1829; Tretyakov Gallery, originally from the Sretenskaya Church in Beijing
Portrait paintings

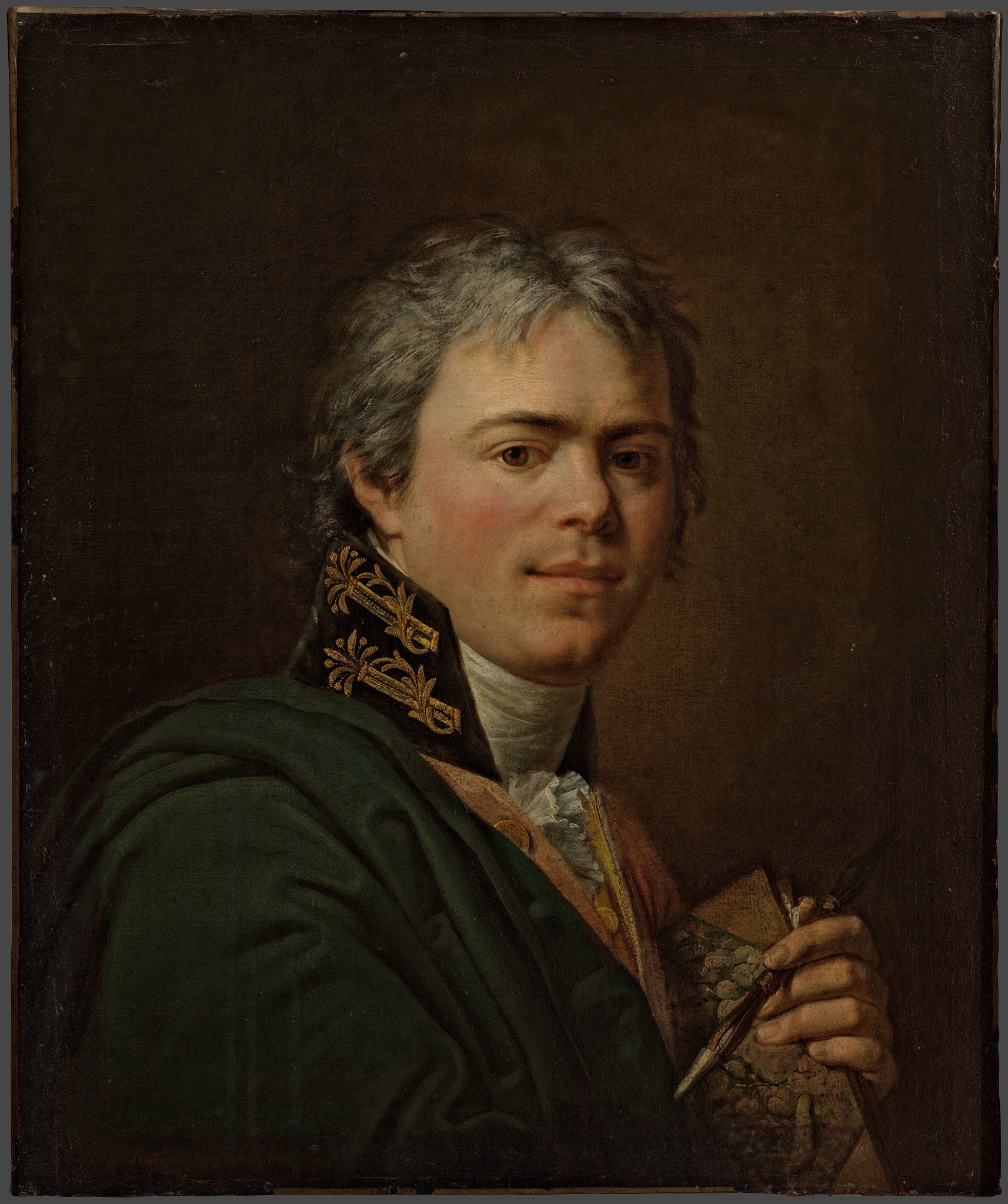
Self-Portrait, 1800; Tretyakov Gallery, formerly in the Rumyantsev Museum

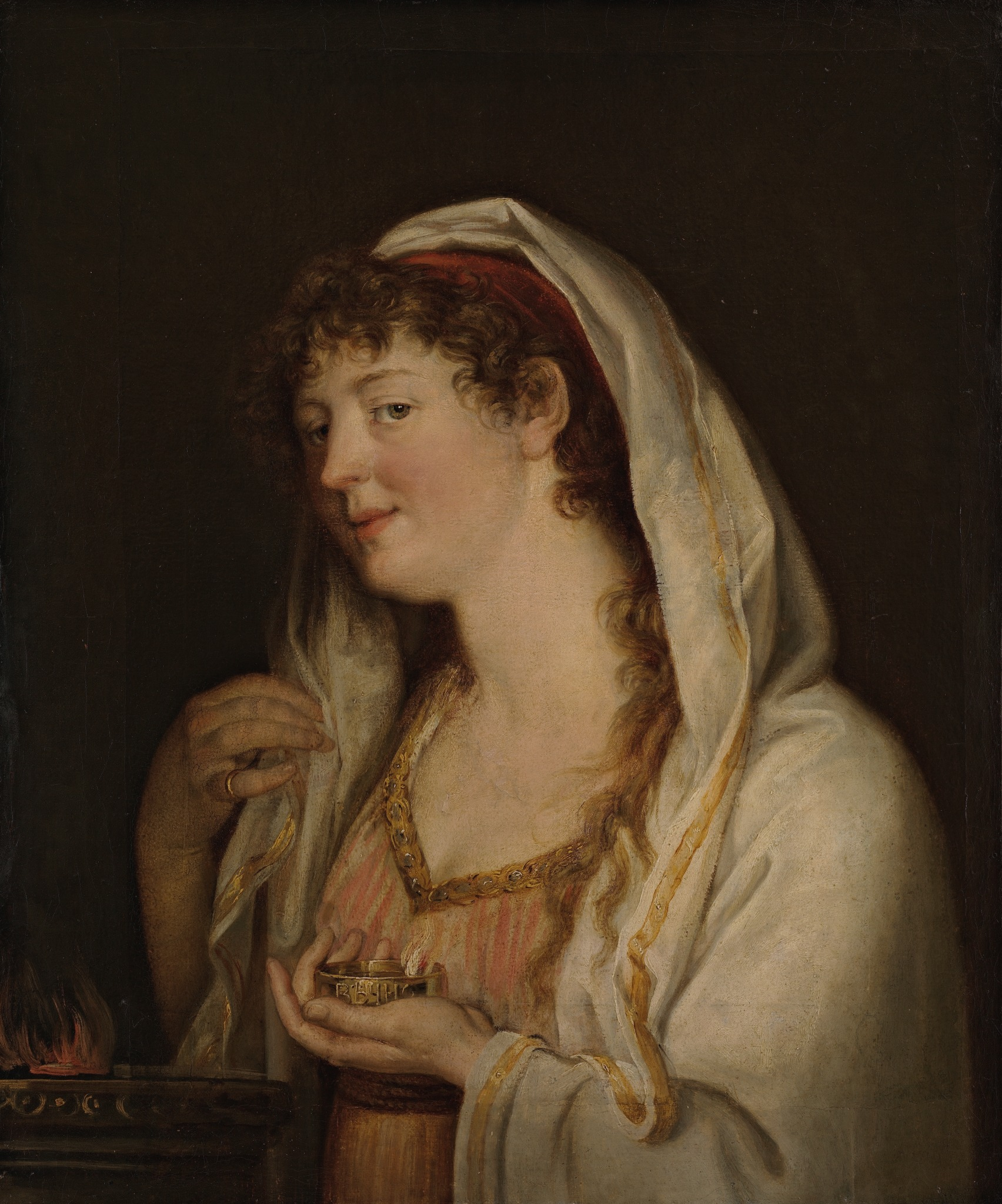
Yekaterina Ivavova (née Dimmert), the painter's spouse, 1800; Tretyakov Gallery, pendant to the prior
