= Christ's Appearance to Mary Magdalene after the Resurrection =

Painting by Russian artist Alexander Ivanov

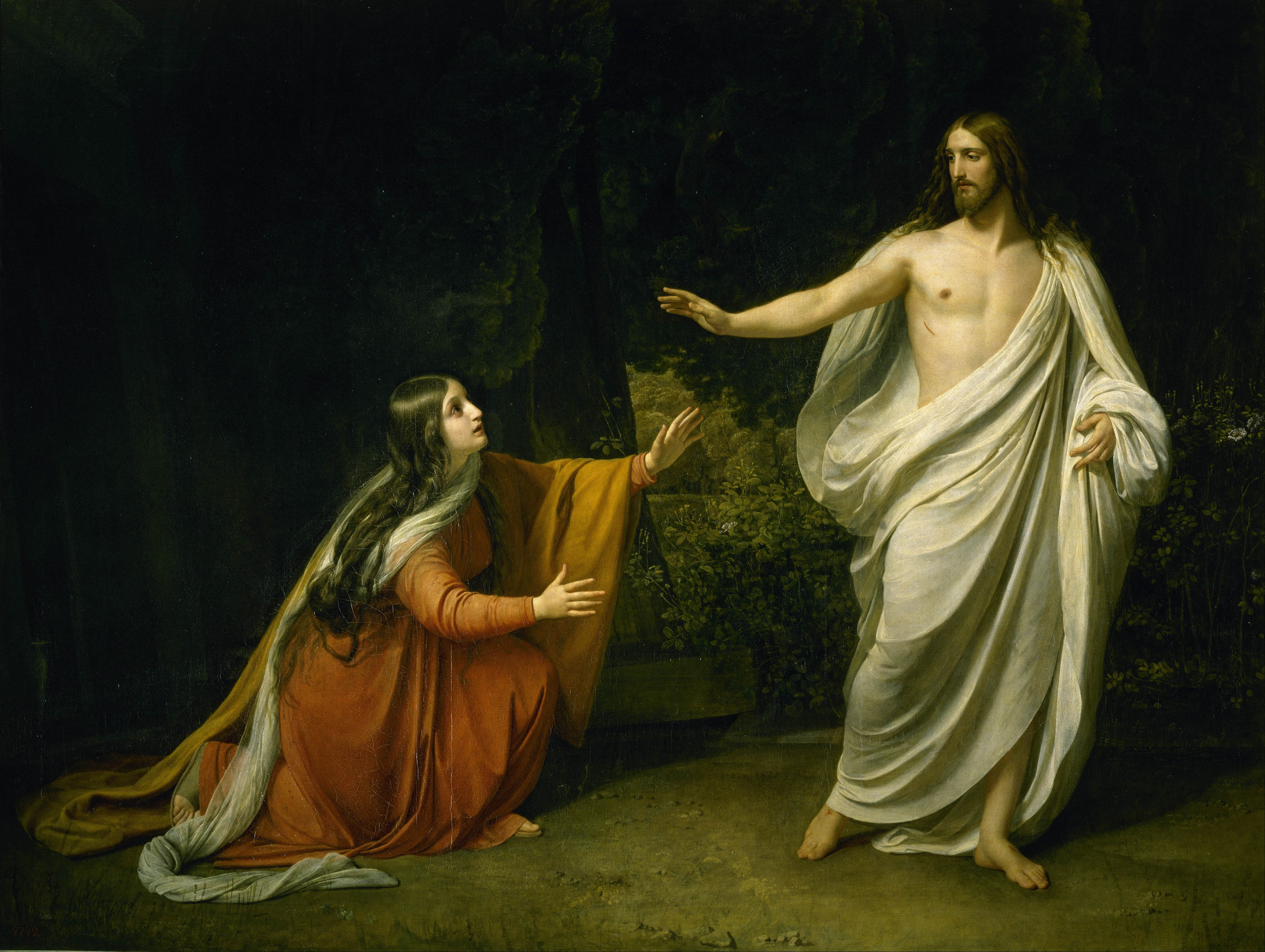
- Year: 1835
- Medium: Oil on canvas
- Dimensions: 242 cm × 321 cm (95 in × 126 in)
- Location: Russian Museum, Saint Petersburg

Christ's Appearance to Mary Magdalene after the Resurrection is a painting by Russian artist Alexander Ivanov (1806–1858), completed in 1835. The painting is housed in the State Russian Museum in St. Petersburg (inventory number Zh-5263). It measures 242 × 321 cm. The canvas depicts Mary Magdalene and Jesus Christ in a life-size two-figure composition. The painting depicts the moment in the Gospel story when Mary Magdalene recognises the risen Christ. However, he stops her impulse by telling her, "Do not cling to me, for I have not yet ascended to the Father".

The initial phase of the project, comprising the creation of sketches and studies, commenced in 1833. Ivanov completed the large canvas between 1834 and 1835 in his studio in Rome. Upon completion of the painting, it was successfully exhibited first in Rome and then, in mid-1836, in St Petersburg. The Imperial Academy of Arts awarded Ivanov the title of Academician for this painting. This allowed the artist to extend his stay in Italy and provided an important foundation for his magnum opus, the canvas The Appearance of Christ Before the People, which Ivanov worked on between 1837 and 1857.

The artist and critic Alexandre Benois wrote that the painting Christ's Appearance to the Magdalene showed "all of [Ivanov's] skill in nudity and drapery." At the same time, according to Benois, in the image of the Magdalene one can see "something that shows what understanding of tragedy Ivanov had already reached, what kind of heart reader he had become, how deeply he could feel, to the point of tears, the tender story of the Gospel". The art historian Mikhail Alpatov noted that the canvas was "a typical work of academic classicism", yet the artist simultaneously achieved "a grandeur that the academicians did not know". In both figures depicted by Ivanov "there is such a majestic dignity that is more characteristic of the heroes of classical tragedy than of the characters of the Gospel legend".

== History ==
=== Background and creation ===
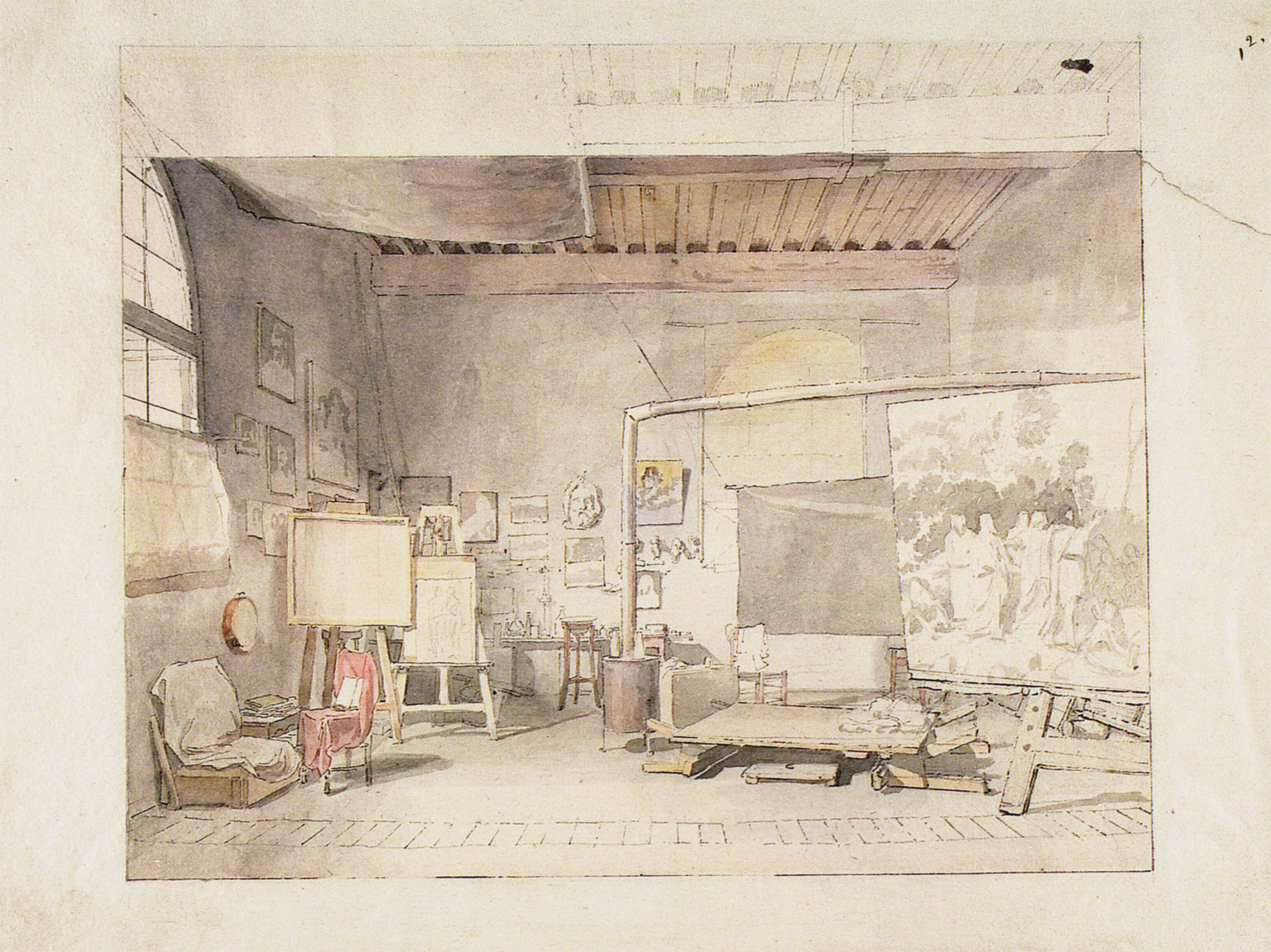
Alexander Ivanov. A. A. Ivanov's workshop in Rome (paper, watercolor, ink, brush, quill, mid 1830s, State Tretyakov Gallery)

As a pensioner of the Society for the Encouragement of Artists, Alexander Ivanov went to Italy in 1830, and began living and working in Rome in 1831. It is documented that in 1833 he had already conceived the idea of creating a monumental multi-figure canvas on the theme of the "Appearance of the Messiah to the People". This was reported in his letter to the Society for the Encouragement of Artists. Nonetheless, the artist initially elected to attempt a more simple, two-figure composition, commencing work on the painting Christ's Appearance to Mary Magdalene in early 1834. This served as an important preparatory phase on the path towards the eventual creation of the canvas The Appearance of Christ Before the People. In a letter to Count Vasily Musin-Pushkin-Bruce dated 28 February 1834, Ivanov reported: Having never tried myself in the production of more, I have now undertaken to write a picture in two figures, in natural size, representing “Jesus in the vertograd”, (Note: in the orchard or vineyard) which is already underpainted."

In the spring and summer of 1834, Alexander Ivanov travelled to northern Italy, "wishing to study all the schools of Italian painting". He went to Venice and Milan, visited Bologna, Ferrara, Padua, Vicenza, Verona, Bergamo, Brescia and other cities. During the journey, the artist carefully studied the works of the old Venetian masters, especially those of Titian. In the drawings of this period, Ivanov "pays particular attention to the development of the plasticity of descending draperies, achieving the impression of their weight and shimmering fabric." Later, the artist noted: "Careful consideration of the Venetian school, and especially copying Titian, helped me a lot to finish the above-mentioned painting 'Jesus, Revealing Himself to the Magdalene'."

In addition to preparing to paint the Apparition of the Messiah, the painting Christ's Appearance to Mary Magdalene was to be a report work for the Society for the Encouragement of Artists, on the funds of which Ivanov was sent to Italy, as well as, it was hoped, to assist in obtaining permission for his planned trip to Palestine. In a letter to the Society for the Encouragement of Artists committee dated 27 November 1834, Ivanov reported that he was still working on the painting Jesus, Revealing Himself to the Magdalene after the Resurrection, "three and a half arshin high, five long," and asked for his pension to be continued: "But, prompted by a lively zeal to prove to the most honourable Society my strength, and to justify myself before it – by the deed itself, I would pray him unceasingly to prolong my pension, promising to send in a short time my painting: ‘Jesus, Revealing Himself to the Magdalene’'"

=== After creation. Italy ===
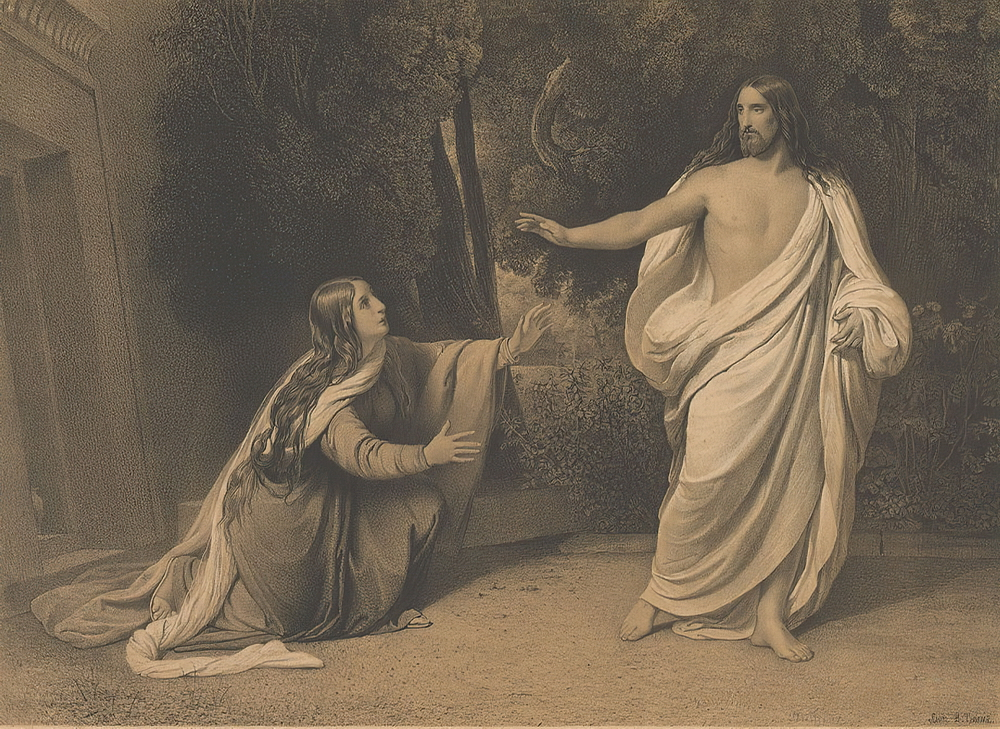
Georg Wilhelm Timm after Ivanov, Christ's Appearance to Mary Magdalene after the Resurrection, lithograph, 1862

The painting, entitled Christ's Appearance to Mary Magdalene, was completed in December 1835 and exhibited in the artist's studio. One of the visitors was the writer Alexei Timofeev, who offered the following commentary on the painting: "‘The Appearance of the Saviour, after the resurrection, to Mary Magdalene Vertograd’ – a subject on which many painters worked; but what is particularly good in this painting – the position of the Saviour. This is God! Greatness, meekness, confidence, goodness, holiness, mightiness. This painting is beautiful!" Other artists had also visited Ivanov's studio. In particular, the Danish painter and sculptor Bertel Thorvaldsen offered a highly complimentary assessment of the painting and the skill of its author. In a letter to his father, Andrey Ivanov, Alexander Ivanov wrote: "More artists looked at my painting: Thorvaldsen in particular announced to everyone his satisfaction with it. This is flattering! It is not easy to earn Thorvaldsen's praise. It can not be bought with neither money, nor meanness." The Italian artist Vincenzo Camuccini, who was not generally inclined to offer praise for Ivanov's work, also commended the painting.

It is likely that the background of Christ's Appearance to Mary Magdalene was less dark in the 19th century than it is today. This is indicated by a lithograph of the painting by Vasily Timm, published in the journal Russky Khudozhestvenniy Listok (No. 24 of 1862). The lithograph clearly illustrates the entrance to the tomb on the left and the trees of the garden in the background. In a letter to his father, Ivanov himself stated that he sought to "avoid blackness" and "convey the morning deepness."

In a letter to the committee of the Society for the Encouragement of Artists dated 28 December 1835, Alexander Ivanov expressed gratitude for the "generous patronage with a double production of pension" and wrote "Now, having finished my painting “The Saviour before the Magdalene in Vertograd”, I hurry to present it to the eyes and the court of my patrons." However, the canvas remained in Italy for some time. In early 1836, the painting was showcased at an exhibition at the Capitoline Museums. It was displayed alongside works by Russian painters Orest Kiprensky and Mikhail Lebedev, as well as German artists August Riedel and Franz Ludwig Catel. As Ivanov himself wrote, "I dared to exhibit it to the public, and here, as far as could be seen, my painting was not lost, standing in a row of bright colourful paintings of Tableaux de genre."

=== After creation. Russia ===
Finally, in May 1836, the painting was sent to St. Petersburg. Despite the favourable reviews it had garnered in Rome, Alexander Ivanov was deeply concerned about how it would be received in Russia. In particular, Ivanov requested that it be exhibited in a 'half-tonne' hall, lit from above, so that this light "would help the subject, that is, that it would resemble the depth of the morning, or appear like the earliest morning, at which hour the Saviour appeared to Magdalene at the tomb." He advised his father, Andrei Ivanov, to place the picture in a gold frame and to "drape [it] with coarse green cloth, by an arshin, on all sides of the frame, so that no pictures would disturb it."

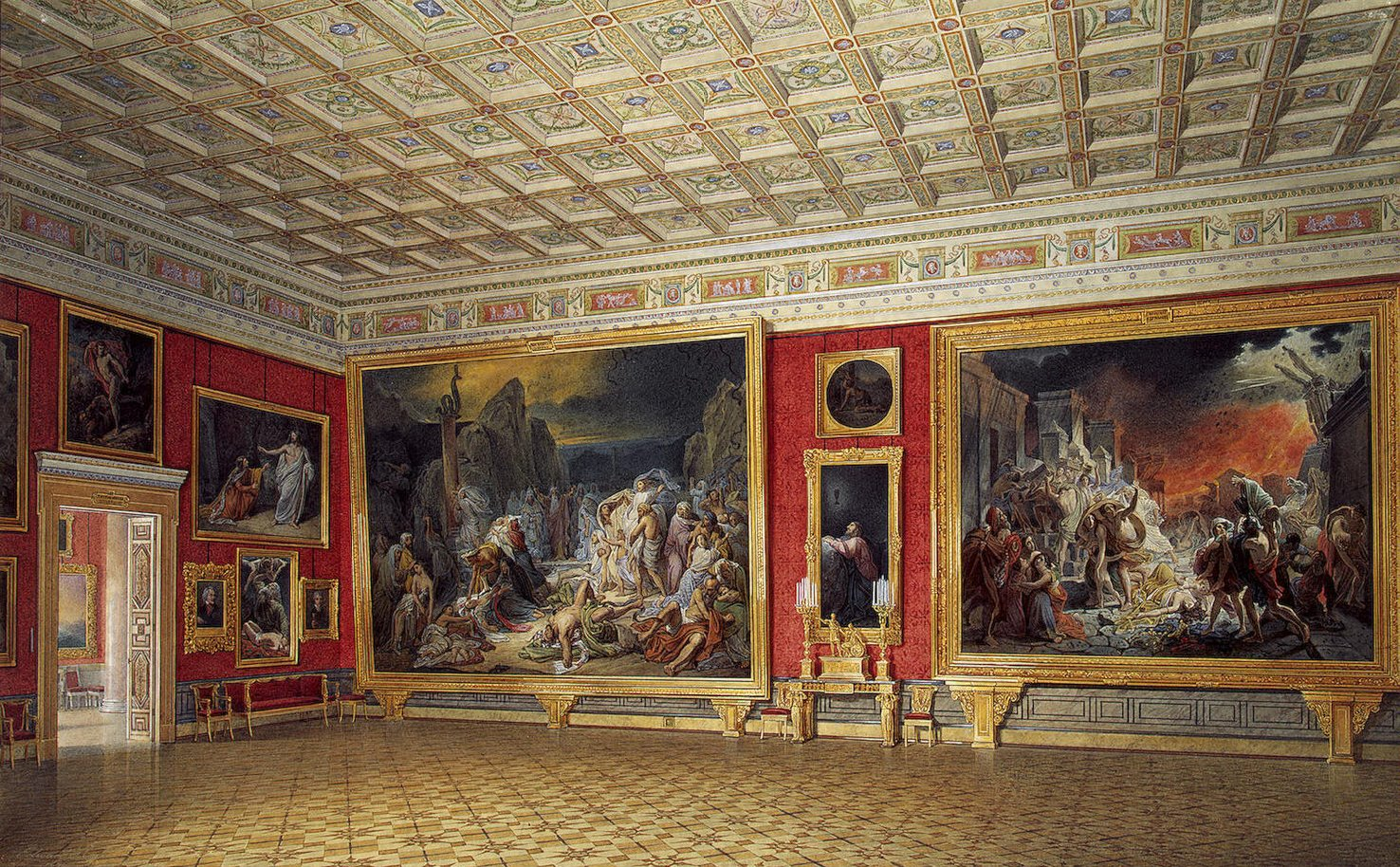
Eduard Hau. Views of the halls of the New Hermitage. Hall of the Russian School (1856, State Hermitage Museum)

The artist's concerns were misplaced; the painting was met with considerable acclaim in St Petersburg. His father wrote to him reassuring him that his concerns about the frame and other details were unwarranted, noting that such a painting "uses its own power, makes a strong impression on the soul of the viewer by the feelings depicted in it." The painter Alexei Yegorov, under whom Alexander Ivanov studied at the Academy, offered a brief yet concise appraisal of the work: "What a style!" The painting received negative reviews as well. For instance, the writer Nestor Kukolnik inquired of the artist Karl Bryullov, "What is this painting by Ivanov? Is it a hoax? Or have I become so outdated that I do not understand anything, or is the painting really bad? Excruciatingly bad, no composition, no colour."

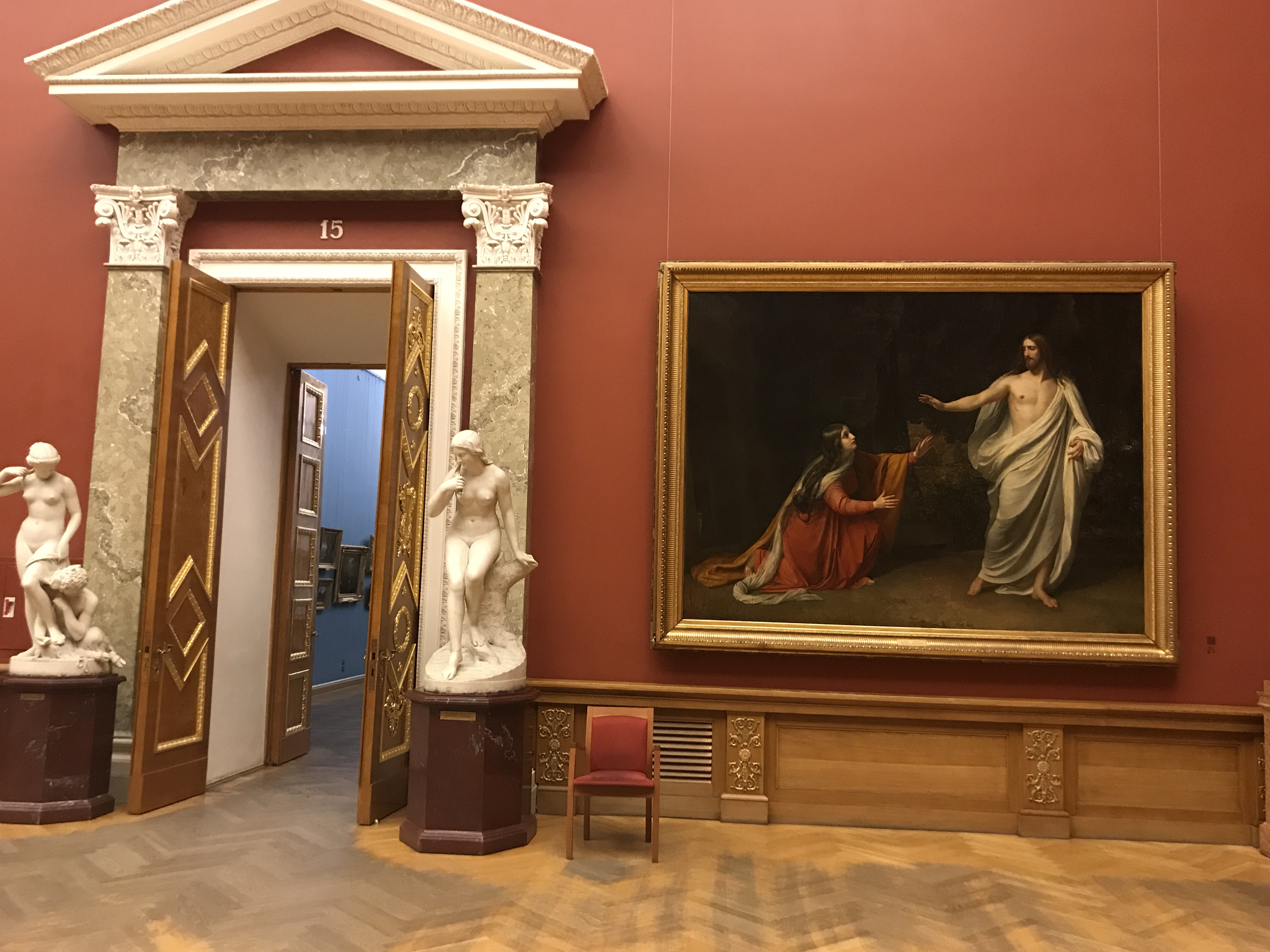
The painting Christ's Appearance to Mary Magdalene after the Resurrection in the State Russian Museum

On 24 September (6 October) 1836, the Imperial Academy of Arts bestowed upon Ivanov the title of Academician in recognition of his painting Christ's Appearance to Mary Magdalene after the Resurrection. The artist himself, who did not aspire to such titles, commented on the matter in a letter to his father, written in October 1836: "What a pity that I was made an Academician: my intention was never to have any rank, but what do I do, to refuse the honour – means to offend the honouring." In the same letter to his father, Alexander Ivanov wrote: "Who would have thought that my painting 'Jesus with the Magdalene' would produce such a thunder? For as long as I have known it, it is the beginning of a notion of something decent. But how pleased I am, how pleased I am that you are delighted, that both the Council and the President are delighted! You say that [they] want to continue [to offer me] pension, for the painting of ‘The Apparition of the Messiah’. That is the only wish I have."

The Society for the Encouragement of Artists presented the painting to Emperor Nicholas I, whereupon it was placed in the Russian Gallery of the Hermitage (the Hermitage inventory number 2550 is preserved on the back of the canvas). Ivanov was paid 1,500 roubles in silver for the canvas, a payment which he did not receive until 1843. In 1897, the painting was relocated from the Hermitage to the Russian Museum of Emperor Alexander III (subsequently renamed the State Russian Museum), where it remains. Following the inauguration of the museum in 1898, the painting Christ's Appearance to Mary Magdalene after the Resurrection was displayed at the Mikhailovsky Palace, situated in the same room as the works The Last Day of Pompeii and Siege of Pskov by Karl Bryullov, The Brazen Serpent and Death of Camilla, Sister of Horace by Fyodor Bruni, Christian Martyrs in the Colosseum by Konstantin Flavitsky, Last Supper by Nikolai Ge, and two or three other paintings by Ivan Aivazovsky.

== Subject and description ==
The painting is a two-figure composition of a life-size scale, with Mary Magdalene positioned on the left and Jesus Christ on the right. The painting depicts the moment when, according to the Gospel narrative, Mary Magdalene recognises the resurrected Christ. With a gesture of his right hand, Christ stops her impulse to touch him, saying, "Do not cling to me, for I have not yet ascended to the Father". The colouring of the canvas is largely based on the contrast between "the flaming colours of the Magdalene's dress, shaded by a white coverlet, and the cold whiteness of the drapery enveloping the Saviour's torso".

Alexander Ivanov selected the park of the Villa d'Este in Tivoli as the setting for his painting, a location situated in proximity to Rome. In a letter to his father, the painter Andrey Ivanov, he wrote: "I received your letter on my arrival from Tivoli, where I made studies of the hundred-year-old cypress trees that adorn the garden of the duke d'Este for my painting 'Jesus and Magdalene'; thus, I have now completed the periphery, and I am beginning to finish the figures."

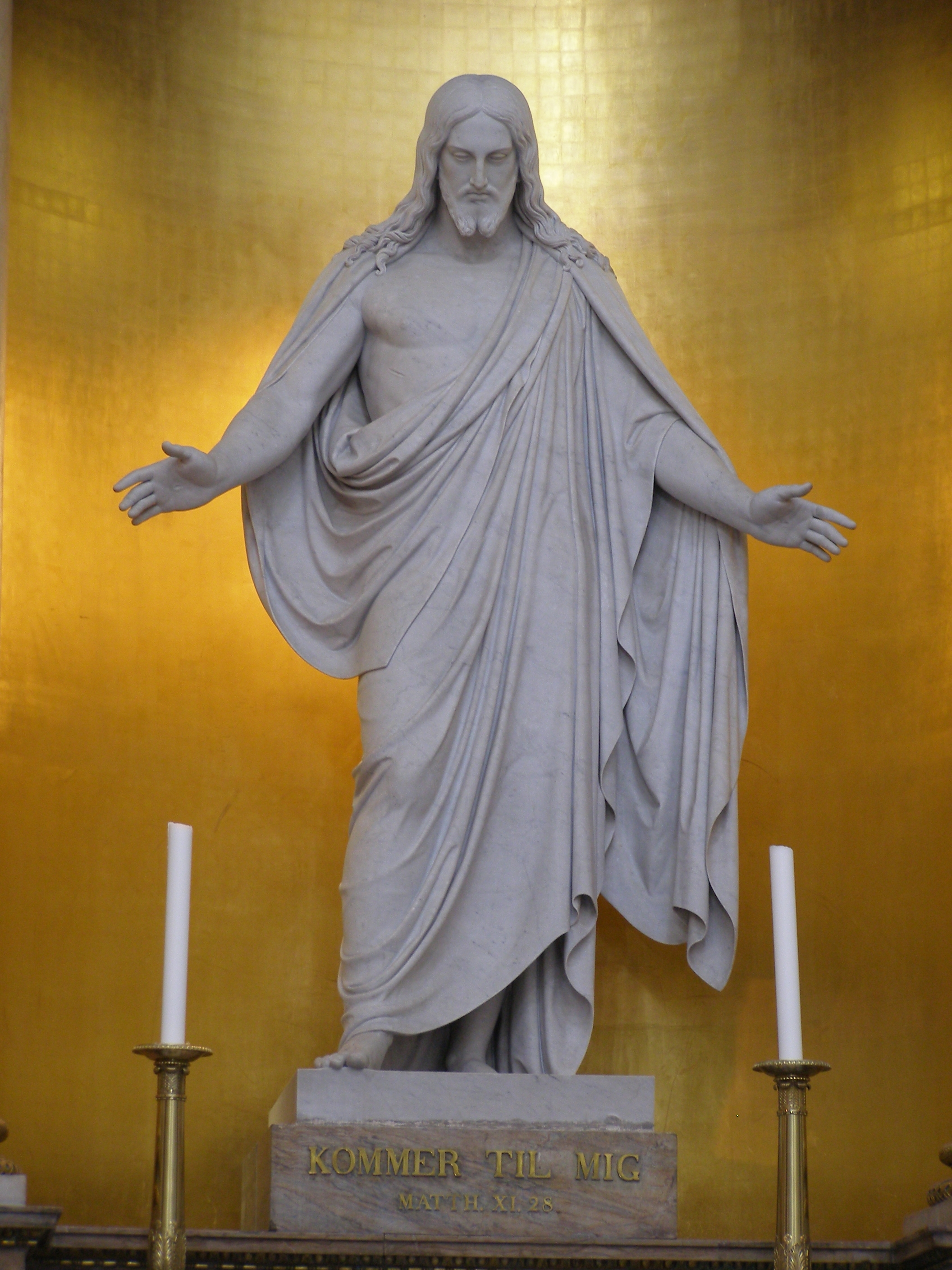
Bertel Thorvaldsen. Christ (Church of Our Lady, Copenhagen)

In preparation for the creation of the image of Christ, Ivanov was significantly influenced by two sculptural works. One such work was a depiction of Christ created by the Danish sculptor and artist Bertel Thorvaldsen, who was residing and working in Rome at the time. Another work is the Apollo Belvedere statue. Additionally, Ivanov created sketches of other antique sculptures, as well as works by renowned artists such as Giotto di Bondone, Fra Angelico, Leonardo da Vinci, Fra Bartolomeo and Raphael.

The State Tretyakov Gallery houses several drawings of Christ's head by Ivanov, painted from various points of view and based on a Thorvaldsen sculpture that the artist worked on during the 1820s and 1830s. It is thought that this formed the basis for the artist's subsequent decision to depict Christ's head in a future painting. Although Ivanov's Christ resembles Torvaldsen's in both face and figure, there are also significant differences: the Danish sculptor depicted Christ in a stable and motionless state, while the Russian artist "presented the figure in motion and managed to do it in such a way that the viewer really gets the illusion of movement."

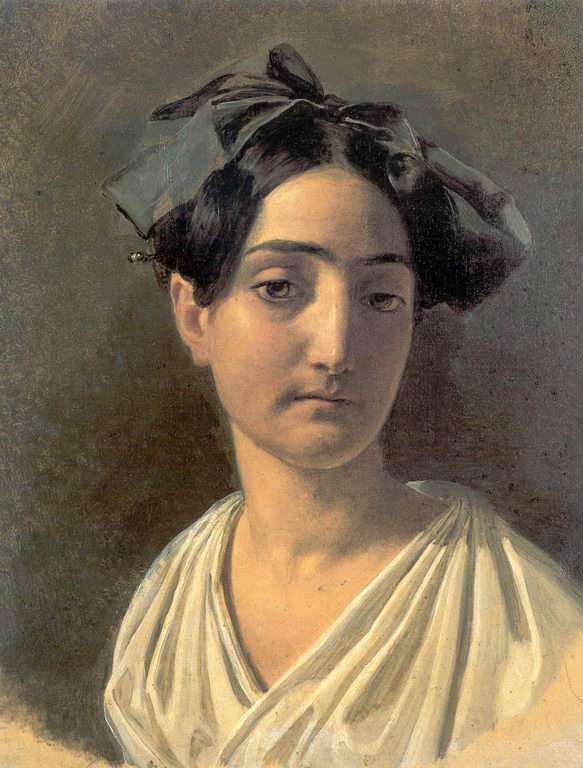
Ivanov, Vittoria Caldoni, 1834; Russian Museum

Alexander Ivanov discussed the composition of the canvas in detail in correspondence with his father, to whom he sent 'drawings' of the future painting in the summer of 1834. Andrey Ivanov wrote to him that "...it seems to me that the figure of Christ represents him hurrying too much...", and quoted the opinion of his daughters (Alexander's sisters), one of whom "found it in the figure of Christ that he was running away from M. Magdalene." Alexander Ivanov took some of these comments into account, and depicted Christ's movement at a slower pace in later versions of the painting.

Ivanov spent a great deal of time trying to understand how best to paint the white robes of Christ. The artist himself noted: "It is not easy to paint a truly colourful white dress that covers most of the figure in its natural size, as my Christ does; the great masters themselves seem to have avoided it. At least I have not found an example in all of Italy."

To create the image of Mary Magdalene, Ivanov posed two models. One of them was Vittoria Caldoni, who was at the time a well-known model and subsequently became the wife of the artist Grigory Lapchenko. The name of the other model remains unknown, but some details of her life have been preserved. It turned out that her husband had been drinking, beating her and demanding money. One day he drove her to such a state that she stabbed him twice. Her injured husband was taken to hospital and she was sent to prison. According to some reports, Ivanov wanted to buy her out with the money he was expecting from the Society for the Encouragement of Artists.

In accordance with the prevailing traditions at the Academy of Arts at the time, the painting was composed in a manner that evoked the style of a sculptural group. Nevertheless, the artist managed to give the characters expressiveness and to show their emotions – "a lyrical canvas that shines through the classical canonicity of the plot". The face of Mary Magdalene exemplifies a transition from sadness to joy, through surprise and consternation. To evoke this emotional state in the sitter, Ivanov prompted her to recall a sad memory and then made her laugh, inducing tears with a bulb. The artist himself described it in a letter to his sister: "Your praise of my ‘Magdalene’ cries out to me to help my sitter, with whom I worked [on] the head and the hands. She was so kind that, remembering all her troubles and crushing to pieces in front of his face the strongest bow, cried, and at the same minute I made her happy and laughed so that full of tears of her eyes with a smile on her lips gave me a perfect concept of Magdalene, who saw Jesus. I did not, however, work in cold blood at the time, my heart beating hard at the sight of the beautiful head smiling through her tears. I think my face was extraordinary, too."

== Sketches and studies ==
The State Russian Museum holds a sketch of the same name for the painting Christ's Appearance to Mary Magdalene after the Resurrection (canvas, oil, 29 × 37 cm, circa 1833, Inventory No. Zh-3857), which was previously in the possession of Koritsky, assistant curator of the Imperial Hermitage Picture Gallery, and subsequently to the artist and collector Mikhail Botkin. The sketch was acquired by the Russian Museum in 1917 from Botkin's collection. Mary Magdalene's face is not visible in the sketch; she has fallen down before Christ, and behind her is an angel seated on a stone slab at the entrance to the tomb. Previously, the sketch was dated "between 1833 and 1835". However, the 2002 catalogue argued that it should be dated to the initial stage of the painting, i.e. 1833. In particular, Alexander Ivanov's letter to his father, dated the end of 1833, in which he wrote that he had decided to limit himself to two figures, is mentioned in connection with the figure of an angel in the sketch: "...now I am preparing for a large painting, where I could show both nudity and my notion of draperies in two figures." An additional sketch of the same name, obtained by Pavel Tretyakov in 1877, is housed in the State Tretyakov Gallery (canvas, oil, 43.5 × 60.4 cm, 1834, Inventory No. 2510). Two studies for this painting, namely Christ's Head (oil on canvas, 55.4 × 44.8 cm, 1834, Inventory No. 7989) and Mary Magdalene's Head (oil on canvas, 65 × 56 cm, 1834, Inventory No. 7975), are also kept there. These studies were previously in the collection of Kozma Soldatyonkov. In accordance with his will, they were subsequently transferred to the Rumyantsev Museum in 1901 and then to the Tretyakov Gallery in 1925.

Christ's Appearance to Mary Magdalene after the Resurrection (sketch, circa 1833, Russian Museum)	Mary Magdalene's Head (1834, State Tretyakov Gallery)	Christ's Head (1834, State Tretyakov Gallery)	Christ's Appearance to Mary Magdalene after the Resurrection (sketch, 1834, State Tretyakov Gallery)

While working on the image of Mary Magdalene, Alexander Ivanov produced a series of graphic studies, the majority of which are dated between 1833 and 1835. Following the artist's death, these studies remained with his brother, the architect Sergei Ivanov (1822–1877). In 1877, a significant portion of the drawings were transferred to the collection of the Rumyantsev Museum. Subsequently, between 1927 and 1929, they were transferred again, this time to the collection of the Tretyakov Gallery. Among them were such studies as Mary Magdalene's head (three variant studies, brown paper, Italian pencil, graphite pencil, 59.7 × 45.6 cm, Inventory No. 8388), Kneeling Mary Magdalene (square-cut paper, Italian pencil, chalk, eraser, 43.7 × 57.6 cm, Inventory No. 8389), Kneeling model (brown paper, Italian pencil, graphite pencil, chalk, 45.8 × 60.6 cm, Inventory No. 8386), Kneeling Figure of Mary Magdalene. Drapery on the Lower Part of the Same Figure (tinted paper, Italian pencil, chalk, 43.8 × 58 cm, Inventory No. 8392), Kneeling Figure of Mary Magdalene (grey paper, Italian pencil, chalk, 40.8 × 46.8 cm, Inventory No. 8390), Half-Naked Model (a sheet from an album, paper, Italian pencil, 26.3 × 37.6 cm, 1830s, Inventory No. 13847) and others.

Graphic studies for the painting Christ's Appearance to Mary Magdalene after the Resurrection (1833–1835, State Tretyakov Gallery)

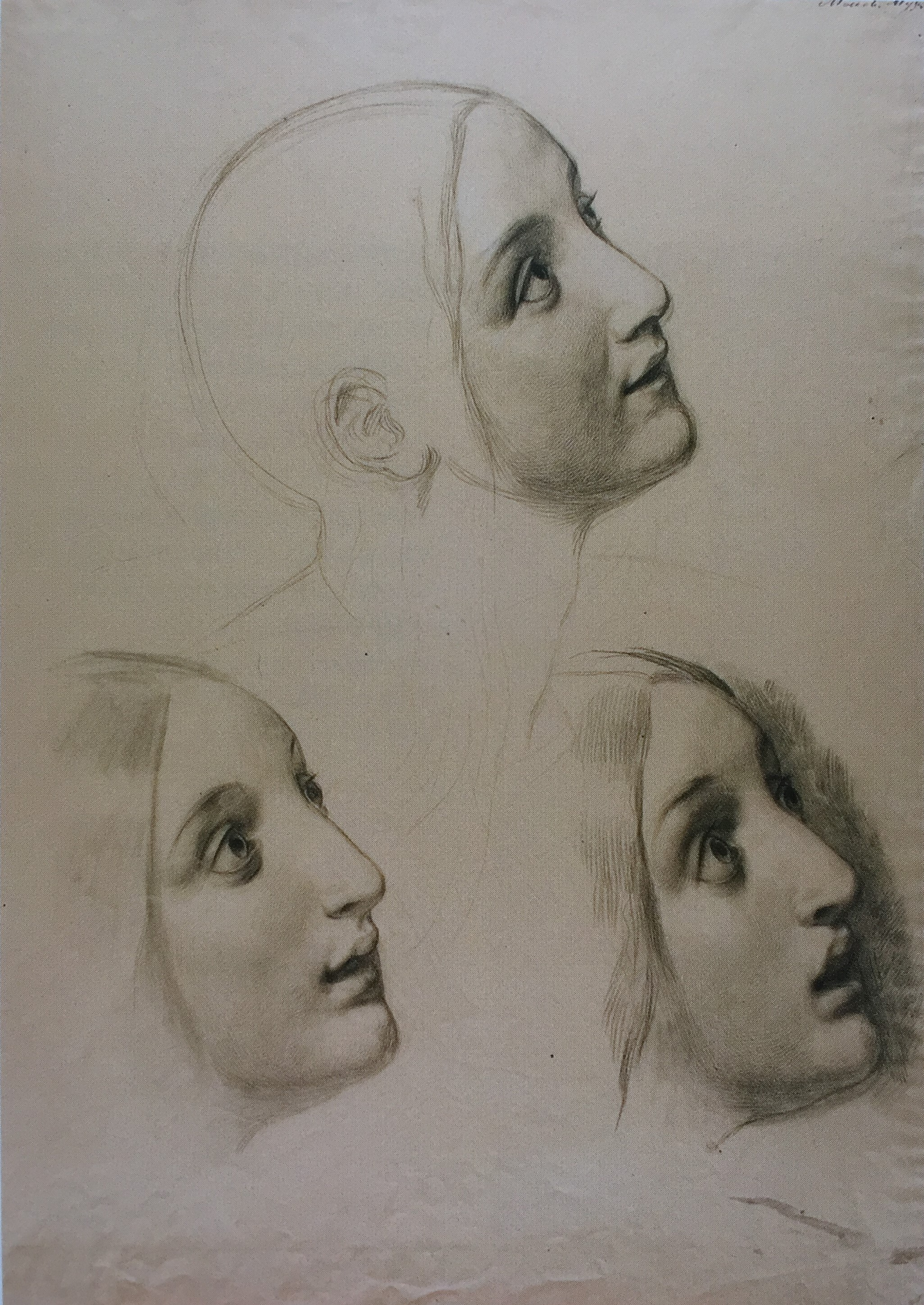
Mary Magdalene's head

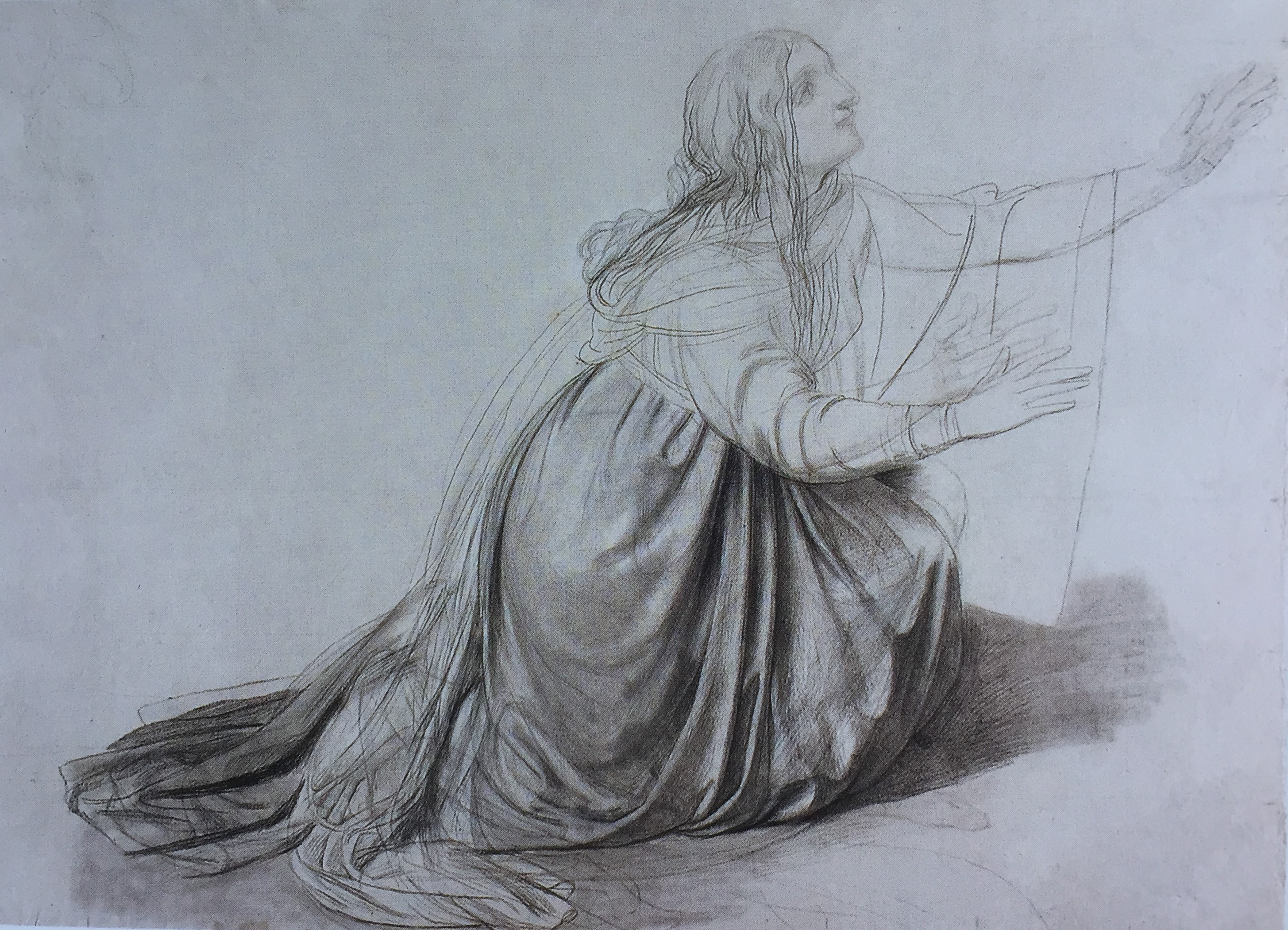
Kneeling Mary Magdalene

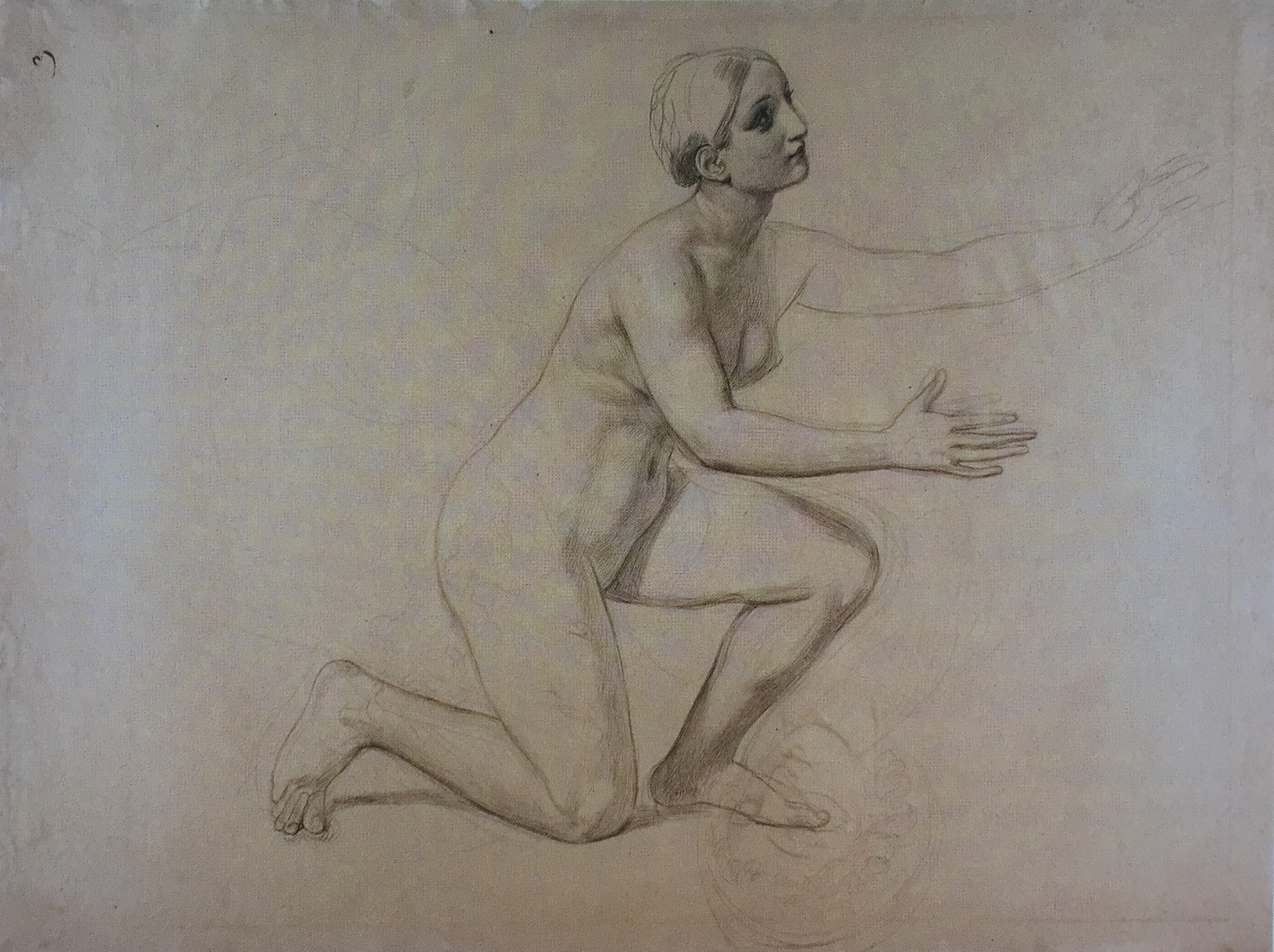
Kneeling model

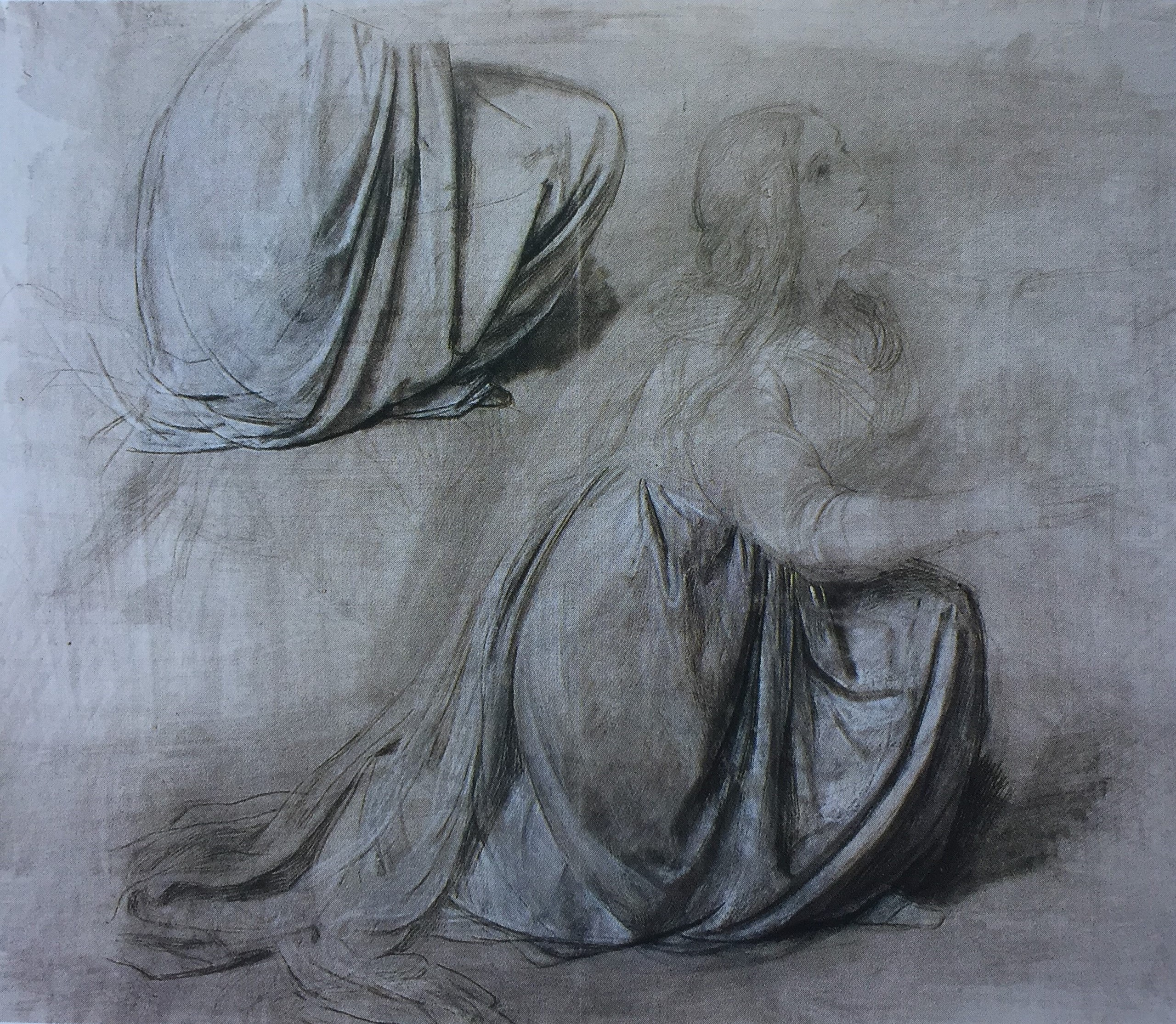
Kneeling Figure of Mary Magdalene. Drapery

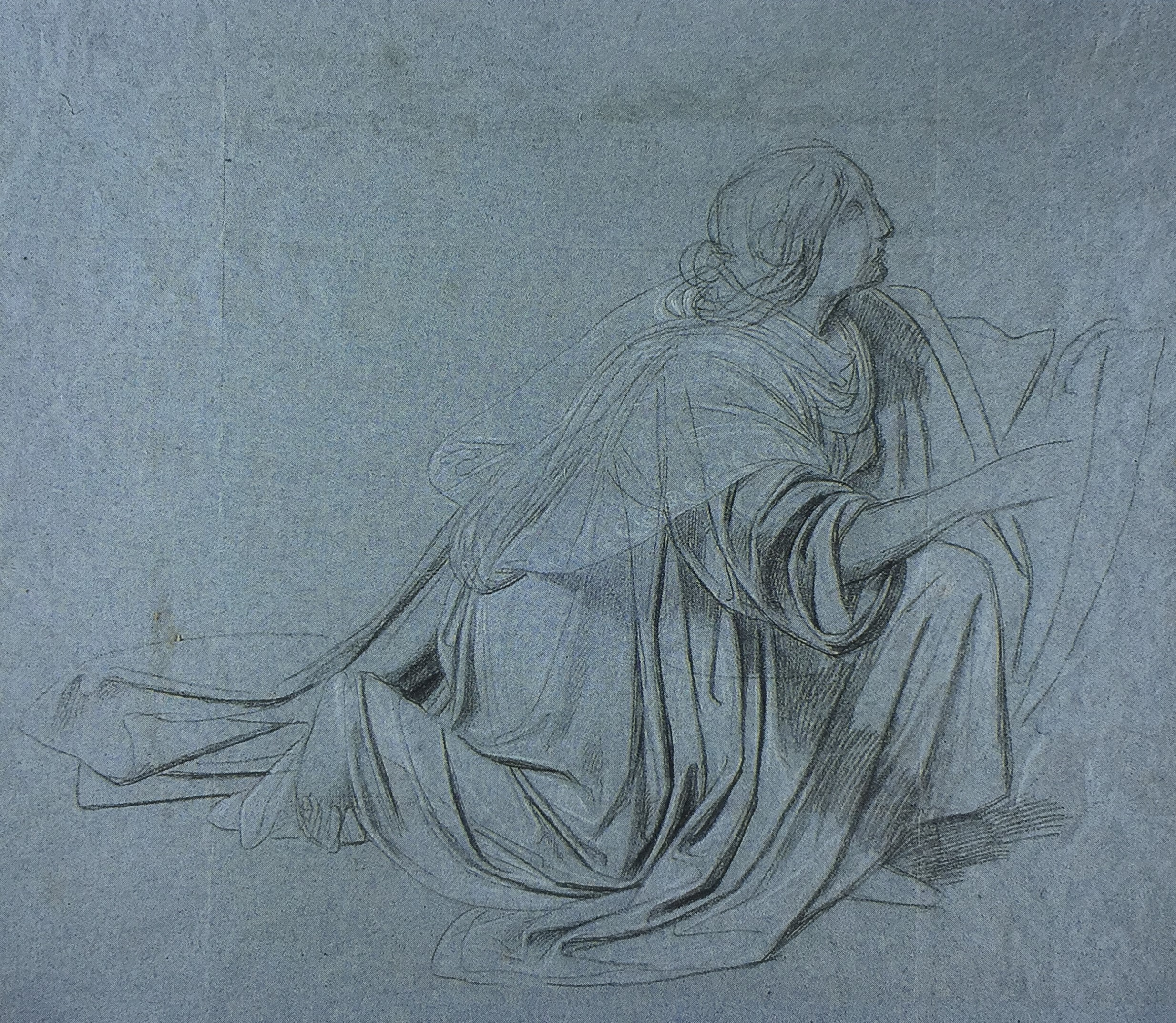
Kneeling figure of Mary Magdalene

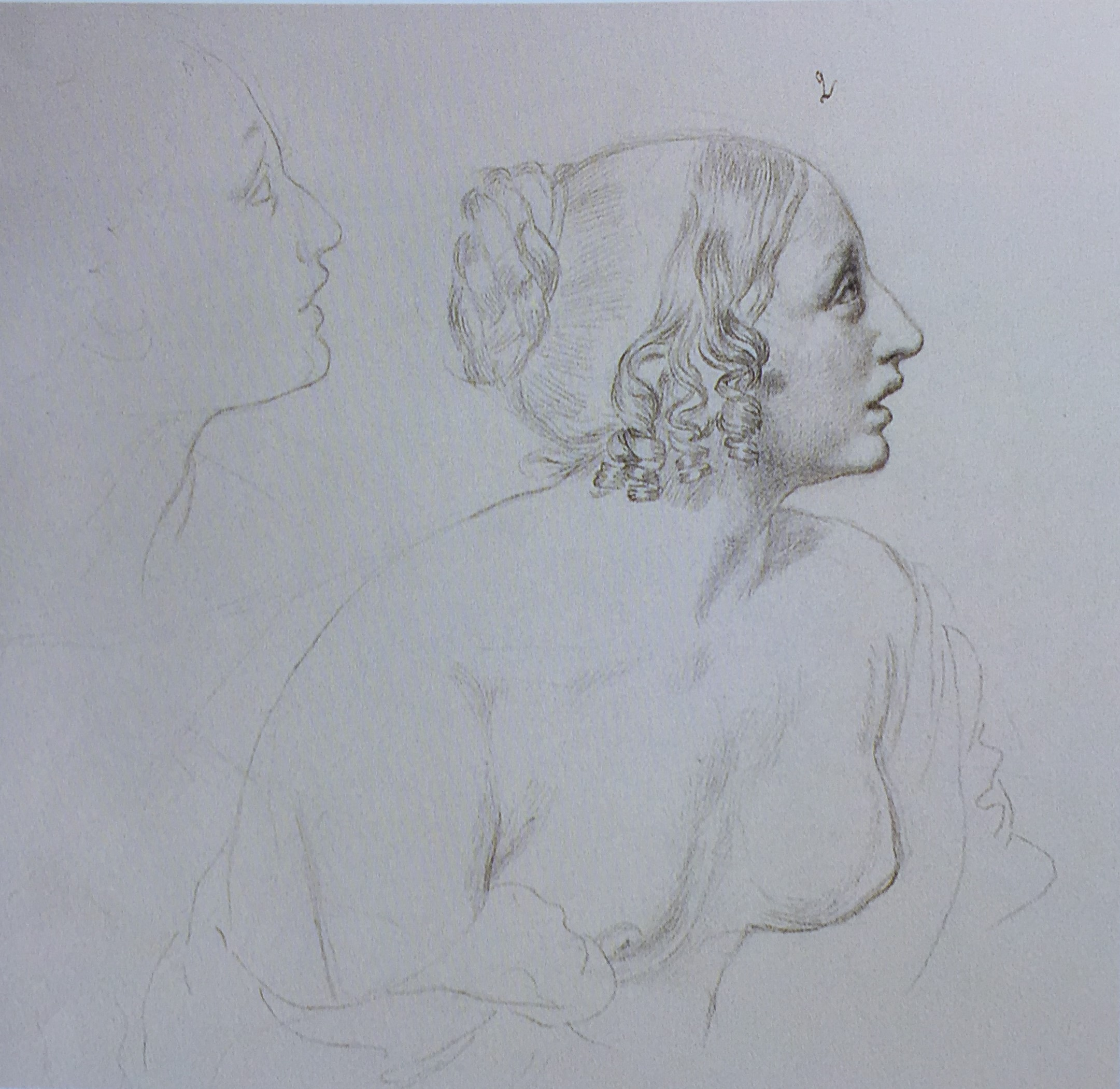
Half-naked model

In the late 1840s and 1850s, Alexander Ivanov produced a series of works entitled 'Biblical Sketches', in which he returned to the subject of the resurrection. This resulted in the creation of the sketch Christ's Appearance to Mary Magdalene at the Resurrection (brown paper, watercolour, whitewash, Italian pencil, 26.3 × 40 cm, State Tretyakov Gallery, Inventory No. 8600 ob.) In comparison to the 1835 painting, the subsequent sketch evinces a greater sense of impetus and movement in the figures of Christ and Mary Magdalene: "this impression is greatly aided by the character of the architectural space; huge steps going deep into the depths, and the edge of the balustrade crossing the composition."

== Reviews and criticism ==
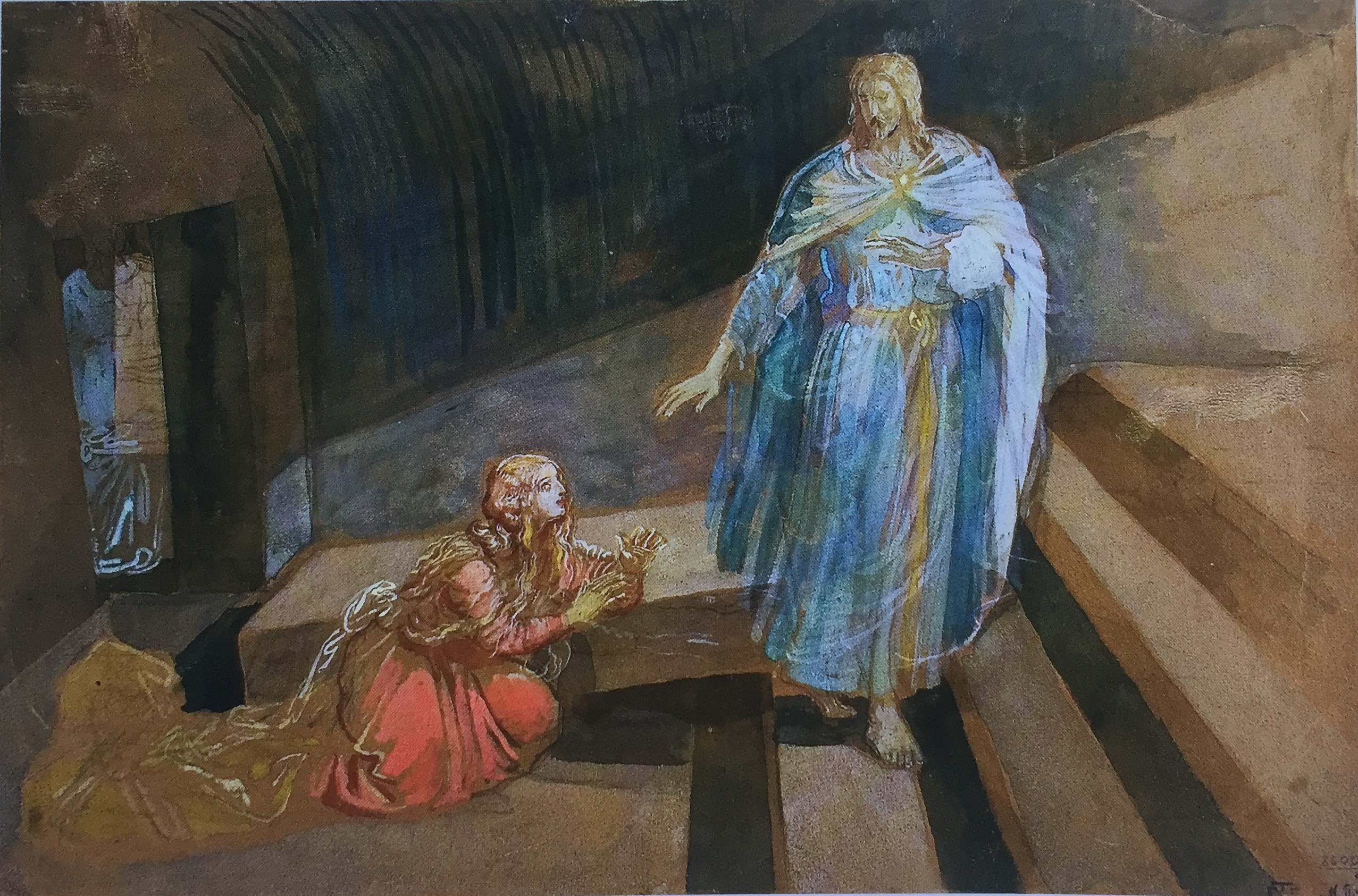
Ivanov, Christ's Appearance to Mary Magdalene after Resurrection, from the Biblical Sketches, the late 1840s to the 1850s; Tretyakov Gallery

While praising the artist's skill in depicting clothing and other details, critics noted the excessive stateliness of the figures, especially Christ, whose figure was compared to the works of the sculptor Bertel Thorvaldsen. In particular, the artist and critic Alexandre Benois wrote in his book 'History of Russian Painting in the 19th Century' that Ivanov's painting Christ's Appearance to Mary Magdalene "really showed all his [the artist's] skill in nudity and draperies, it emanates icy cold." In Benois's words, "the Torvaldsen Christ, pacing in a frozen theatrical pose, the desiccated, precisely engraved landscape, the timid painting, the enormous labour spent on minor things, like writing out folds, – these are the things that, firstly, first of all, what catches one's eye, and it is only by looking closely that one sees something in Magdalene's head that shows to what understanding of the tragic Ivanov had already reached at that time, what a heartbreaker he had become, how deeply he was able to feel to the point of tears the heart-warming story of the Gospel."

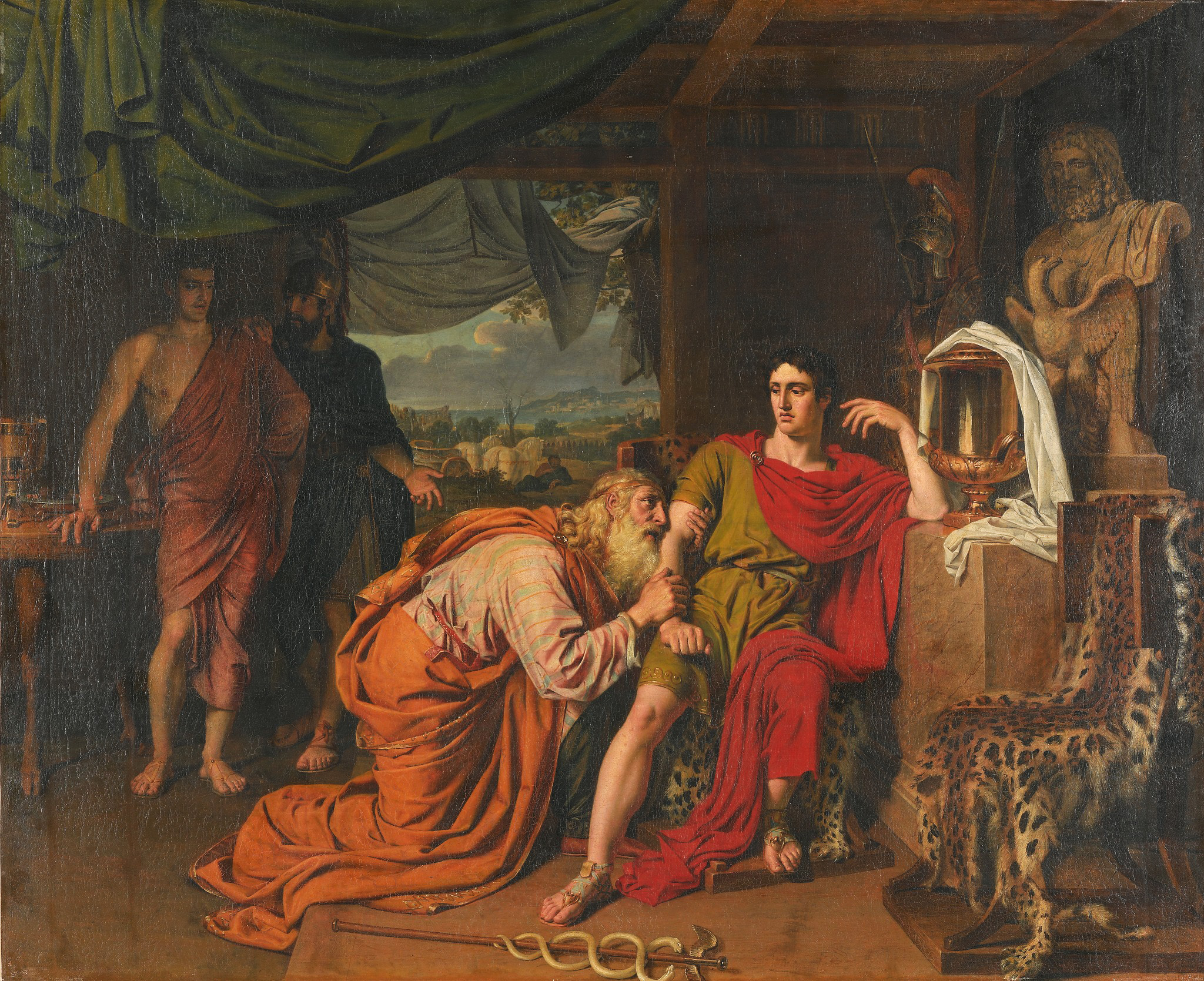
Alexander Ivanov. Priam asks Achilles to return Hector's body (canvas, oil, 1824, State Tretyakov Gallery)

Art historian Nina Dmitrieva, in her work "Biblical Sketches by Alexander Ivanov", also noted that "in the expression of Magdalene's face, who saw alive the one she thought dead, in her smile through her tears there was a theme of joyful shock, glittering hope, dominating in the psychological solution of the conceived big picture". Simultaneously, she continued, "the figure of Christ, posed in the pose of Apollo Belvedere, is treated too academically, and the face is insignificant."

In his writings, art historian Nikolai Mashkovtsev posited that the painting Christ's Appearance to Mary Magdalene after the Resurrection constituted one of the preparatory works undertaken in pursuit of Ivanov's ambitious project: the creation of the canvas Appearance of Christ before the People. Mashkovtsev noted that the painting Christ's Appearance to Mary Magdalene not only satisfied the artist's desire "to show his concept of nudity and draperies", but also contained "something much more." Nevertheless, according to Mashkovtsev, the canvas "in its general structure is still a picture of a purely classicist order": generally similar in its composition to Ivanov's academic work Priam asks Achilles to return Hector's body (1824, State Tretyakov Gallery), this later work reveals noble emotions even more clearly, in it "the staging of the figures and the folds of the robes are even more majestic."

According to the art historian Mikhail Alpatov, Christ's Appearance to Mary Magdalene after the Resurrection is "a typical work of academic classicism", as the scene of the meeting between Christ and Mary Magdalene is "intentional" and their movements and poses "have a significant element of theatricality". Nevertheless, in Alpatov's opinion, Ivanov managed to achieve "a grandeur that the academicians had never known", and "the very juxtaposition of the figures of Christ and Mary Magdalene falling to her knees is the artist's good fortune." Alpatov noted that in both of Ivanov's figures "there is such a majestic dignity that is more characteristic of the heroes of classical tragedy than of the characters of the Gospel legend."

== Bibliography ==
- Alpatov, Mikhail V. (1956). Александр Андреевич Иванов. Жизнь и творчество [Alexander Andreyevich Ivanov. Life and work] (in Russian). Vol. 1. Moscow: Iskusstvo.
- Alpatov, Mikhail V. (1956). Александр Андреевич Иванов. Жизнь и творчество [Alexander Andreyevich Ivanov. Life and work] (in Russian). Vol. 2. Moscow: Iskusstvo.
- Alpatov, Mikhail V. (1959). Александр Иванов [Alexander Ivanov]. The Lives of Remarkable People (in Russian). Moscow: Molodaya Gvardiya.
- Alpatov, Mikhail V. (1980). Александр Андреевич Иванов [Alexander Andreyevich Ivanov] (in Russian). Moscow: Изобразительное искусство.
- Alpatov, Mikhail V. (1983). Александр Андреевич Иванов [Alexander Andreyevich Ivanov]. Русские живописцы XIX века (in Russian). Leningrad: Художник РСФСР.
- Анисов, Л.М. (2004). Александр Иванов [Alexander Ivanov]. The Lives of Remarkable People (in Russian). Moscow: Molodaya Gvardiya. ISBN 5-235-02610-1.
- Benois, Alexandre (1995). История русской живописи в XIX веке [History of Russian painting in the 19th century] (in Russian). Moscow: Республика. ISBN 5-250-02524-2.
- Benois, Akexandre (1980). Мои воспоминания [My memories] (in Russian). Vol. 2 (books 4, 5). Moscow: Nauka. ISBN 978-5-517-95473-2.
- Виноградов, И.И. (2001). Александр Иванов в письмах, документах, воспоминаниях [Alexander Ivanov in letters, documents, memoirs] (in Russian). Moscow: XXI век — Согласие. ISBN 5-293-00034-9.
- Даниэль, С.М. (1994). Библейские сюжеты [Biblical stories]. Русские живописцы XIX века (in Russian). Saint Petersburg: Художник России. ISBN 5-7370-0312-4.
- Дмитриева, Н.А. (2009). В поисках гармонии. Искусствоведческие работы разных лет [In search of harmony. Art criticism works of different years] (in Russian). Moscow: Прогресс-Традиция. ISBN 978-5-89826-290-7.
- Зотов, А.И. (1945). Александр Андреевич Иванов [Alexander Andreyevich Ivanov]. Массовая библиотека (in Russian). Moscow: Iskusstvo.
- Маркина, Л.А. (2006). "Александр Иванов. Очерк творчества" [Alexander Ivanov. Outline of creative work]. Александр Андреевич Иванов. 1806—1858. К 150-летию Государственной Третьяковской галереи. К 200-летию со дня рождения художника [Alexander Andreyevich Ivanov. 1806–1858. To the 150th anniversary of the State Tretyakov Gallery. To the 200th anniversary of the birth of the artist] (in Russian). Moscow: СканРус. pp. 9–18. ISBN 5-93221-108-3.
- Маркина, Л.А. (2006). "Александр Иванов — К 200-летию со дня рождения" [Alexander Ivanov - To the 200th anniversary of his birth] (PDF). Tretyakov Gallery (in Russian) (6): 4–19.
- Машковцев, Н.Г. (1964). "А. А. Иванов". История русского искусства [History of Russian Art] (in Russian). Vol. 8, book 2. И. Э. Грабарь, В. С. Кеменов, В. Н. Лазарев. Moscow: Nauka. pp. 156–230.
- Перова, Д.А. (2010). Александр Андреевич Иванов [Alexander Andreyevich Ivanov]. Великие художники, vol. 39 (in Russian). Moscow: Directmedia Publishing and Komsomolskaya Pravda. ISBN 978-5-7475-0016-7.
- Петинова, Е.Ф. (2001). Русские художники XVIII — начала XX века [Russian artists of the 18th - early 20th century] (in Russian). Saint Petersburg: Аврора. ISBN 978-5-7300-0714-7.
- Плотникова, Е.Л. (2006). "Восхождение. От академических картонов до Библейских эскизов" [Ascent. From Academic Cartons to Biblical Sketches]. Александр Андреевич Иванов. 1806—1858. К 150-летию Государственной Третьяковской галереи. К 200-летию со дня рождения художника [Alexander Andreyevich Ivanov. 1806-1858. To the 150th anniversary of the State Tretyakov Gallery. To the 200th anniversary of the birth of the artist]. Moscow: СканРус. pp. 120–135. ISBN 5-93221-108-3.
- Собко, Н.П. (1895). "Иванов Александр Андреевич" [Ivanov Alexander Andreyevich]. Словарь русских художников с древнейших времён до наших дней (XI—XIX вв.) [Dictionary of Russian artists from the most ancient times to the present day (11th-19th cc.).]. Vol. II, iss. 1 (И, I). Saint Petersburg: Типография М. М. Стасюлевича. Columns 5—297.
- Степанова, С.С. (2006). "Хроника жизни и творчества Александра Андреевича Иванова" [Chronicle of the life and work of Alexander Andreyevich Ivanov]. Александр Андреевич Иванов. 1806—1858. К 150-летию Государственной Третьяковской галереи. К 200-летию со дня рождения художника [Alexander Andreyevich Ivanov. 1806–1858. To the 150th anniversary of the State Tretyakov Gallery. To the 200th anniversary of the birth of the artist] (in Russian). Moscow: СканРус. pp. 225–247. ISBN 5-93221-108-3.
- Степанова, С.С. (2011). Русская живопись эпохи Карла Брюллова и Александра Иванова. Личность и художественный процесс [Russian painting of the epoch of Karl Bryullov and Alexander Ivanov. Personality and artistic process] (in Russian). Saint Petersburg: Искусство-СПб. ISBN 978-5-210-01638-6.
- Ульянинская, А.И. (1956). "История создания картины А. А. Иванова «Явление Христа Марии Магдалине»" [History of the creation of A. A. Ivanov's painting "Christ's Appearance to Mary Magdalene"]. Государственная Третьяковская галерея. Материалы и исследования. I. Moscow: Советский художник: 97–110.
- Цомакион, А.И. (2014). Александр Иванов. Его жизнь и художественная деятельность [Alexander Ivanov. His life and artistic work] (in Russian). Moscow: Проспект. ISBN 978-5-3921-6930-6.
- Яковлева, Н.А. (2005). Историческая картина в русской живописи [Historical painting in Russian painting]. Энциклопедия мирового искусства (in Russian). Moscow: Белый город. ISBN 5-7793-0898-5.
- Александр Андреевич Иванов: его жизнь и переписка. 1806—1858 гг [Alexander Andreyevich Ivanov: his life and correspondence. 1806–1858.] (in Russian). М. П. Боткин. Saint Petersburg: Типография М. М. Стасюлевича. 1880.
- Государственная Третьяковская галерея — каталог собрания [State Tretyakov Gallery – catalogue of the collection] (in Russian). Vol. 3: Живопись первой половины XIX века. Я.В. Брук, Л.И. Иовлева. Moscow: СканРус. 2005. ISBN 5-93221-081-8.
- Государственная Третьяковская галерея — каталог собрания [State Tretyakov Gallery - catalogue of the collection] (in Russian). Vol. 2, кн. 3: Рисунок XVIII—XX веков. А. А. Иванов. Я.В. Брук, Л.И. Иовлева. Moscow: СканРус. 2014. ISBN 978-5-89580-053-9.
- Государственный Русский музей — Живопись, XVIII — начало XX века (каталог) [State Russian Museum - Painting, 18th - early 20th century (catalogue)] (in Russian). Leningrad: Аврора и Искусство. 1980.
- Государственный Русский музей — каталог собрания [State Russian Museum – catalogue of the collection] (in Russian). Vol. 2: Живопись первой половины XIX века (А—И). Г.Н. Голдовский. Saint Petersburg: Palace Editions. 2002.
- "Рисунок и акварель из собрания Государственной Третьяковской галереи" [Drawing and watercolour from the collection of the State Tretyakov Gallery]. Александр Андреевич Иванов. 1806—1858. К 150-летию Государственной Третьяковской галереи. К 200-летию со дня рождения художника [Alexander Andreyevich Ivanov. 1806-1858. To the 150th anniversary of the State Tretyakov Gallery. To the 200th anniversary of the birth of the artist] (in Russian). Moscow: СканРус. 2006. pp. 136–207. ISBN 5-93221-108-3.
