= The Brazen Serpent (Bruni) =

1841 painting by Fyodor Bruni

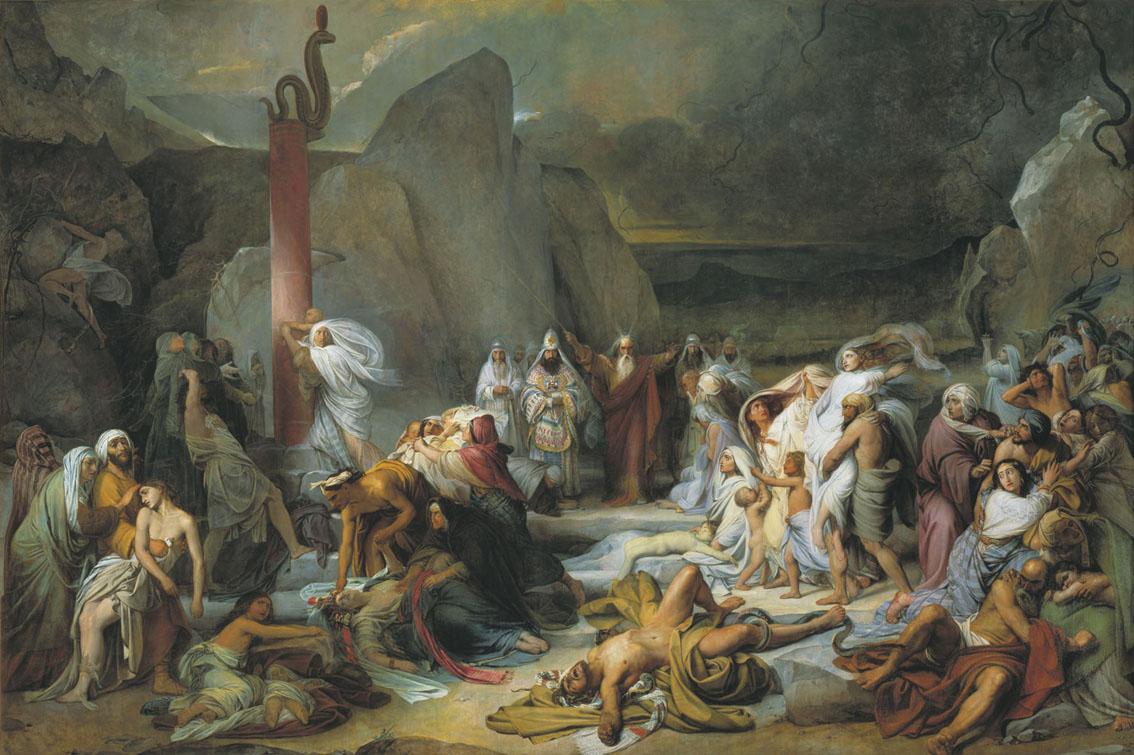
- Artist: Fyodor Bruni
- Year: 1841
- Medium: Oil on canvas
- Dimensions: 565 cm × 852 cm (222 in × 335 in)
- Location: Russian Museum, St. Petersburg

The Brazen Serpent is a giant painting by the Russian artist of Italian origin Fyodor Bruni (1799-1875), completed in 1841. It is part of the collection of the State Russian Museum in St. Petersburg (inventory number Zh-5070). The size of the painting is 565×852 cm.

Bruni's inspiration for the painting was a story described in the Old Testament about how the Jewish people, led out of Egypt by the prophet Moses, began to lose faith and murmur after years of wandering in the stony desert. This led to God's punishment — a rain of poisonous snakes to save them from the deadly bites of a brazen serpent.

Bruni worked on this painting for about fifteen years: he informed the Imperial Society for the Encouragement of the Arts that he had begun work on the large painting in February 1827, and completed it in 1841. In 1833-1836 he worked in Italy, then he was called back to Saint Petersburg to teach at the Imperial Academy of Arts, and in 1838 he returned to Rome, where he completed the painting.

The painting was sent to Russia in the summer of 1841, after a successful exhibition in Rome. It was exhibited in the Winter Palace and after a while it was transferred to the Academy of Arts. From the very beginning, "The Brazen Serpent" was often compared with Karl Bryullov's large-format painting "The Last Day of Pompeii", which appeared seven years earlier - later, both paintings were exhibited side by side in the Hermitage and the Russian Museum; they were called "colossi of Russian painting".

The surface of the canvas is about 48 m^{2}, the weight of the canvas is about 70 kg. It is considered to be the largest Russian history painting, the largest painting in the collection of the State Russian Museum, and the largest among easel paintings of the first half of the 19th century.

== Plot and description ==
The plot of The Brazen Serpent is based on a story described in the Old Testament, in the Book of Numbers, the fourth book of the Torah. After years of wandering in the waterless, stony desert through which Moses led the people of Judah out of Egyptian captivity, the people began to murmur because they doubted the prophet's ability to lead them. Then the Lord's punishment came upon them-the rain of poisonous serpents. They repented and began to ask for forgiveness, and then Moses set up the brazen serpent, as the Lord had commanded him, so that those who looked at it with true faith would live and be healed of the serpent's bites:

"Then the Lord said to Moses, ‘Make a snake image and mount it on a pole. When anyone who is bitten looks at it, he will recover.’ So Moses made a bronze snake and mounted it on a pole. Whenever someone was bitten, and he looked at the bronze snake, he recovered’”. (Numbers 21:8-9)

Bruni himself, discussing the idea of the painting, wrote: "I tried to make it so that at first glance it would evoke the pathetic pathos of this terrible scene and bear the stamp of God's punishment. The final version of the painting is a huge multi-figure composition, in which it is difficult to distinguish any main character. Some people seek salvation in the bronze snake, while others panic and try to avoid the rain of live snakes. Some are shocked by the death of their loved ones, some pray to God for forgiveness, and some curse him and Moses. The painting is full of depictions of grief, pain, horror, and death.

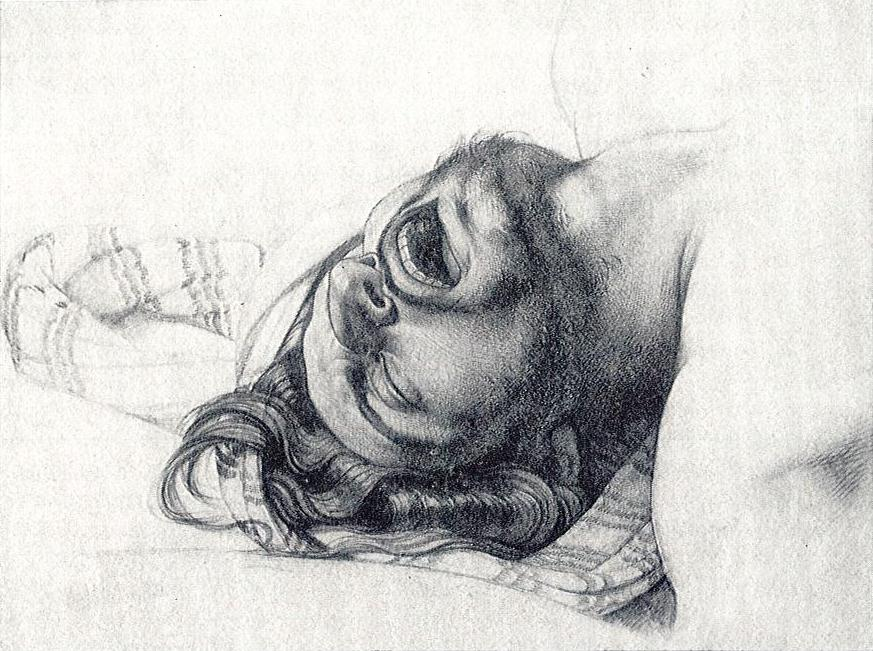
Bruni, Head of a Screaming Man, preparatory drawing for The Brazen Serpent, c. 1840

In the center of the painting, in the background, is the prophet Moses, pointing with his staff at the brass serpent and signaling with his other hand to approach it. His gaze is stern as he looks over the heads of the suffering people. Next to him stands the high priest Eleazar, son of Aaron, Moses' brother, and behind them a group of Levites. Moses and Eleazar are placed in the geometric center of the canvas, symbolizing supernatural power — on the one hand, to punish (Eleazar), and on the other, to show the way to salvation (Moses).

But it is not Moses and Eleazar, but the people in the larger foreground of the painting who first attract the viewer's attention. They are frightened and desperate, not even thinking of seeking salvation or looking at the bronze snake: it is as if they do not hear Moses or are simply incapable of heeding his advice. In the centre of the painting is a young man of athletic build, writhing in agony from snakebites. His leg is coiled with a snake, and his mouth is wide open: apparently cursing everyone "in fury and blasphemy". His figure is sometimes compared to Lanae. Sometimes his figure is compared to Laocoon, the priest of the god Apollo in Troy, who according to legend was strangled by snakes with his sons ("Laocoon and his sons").

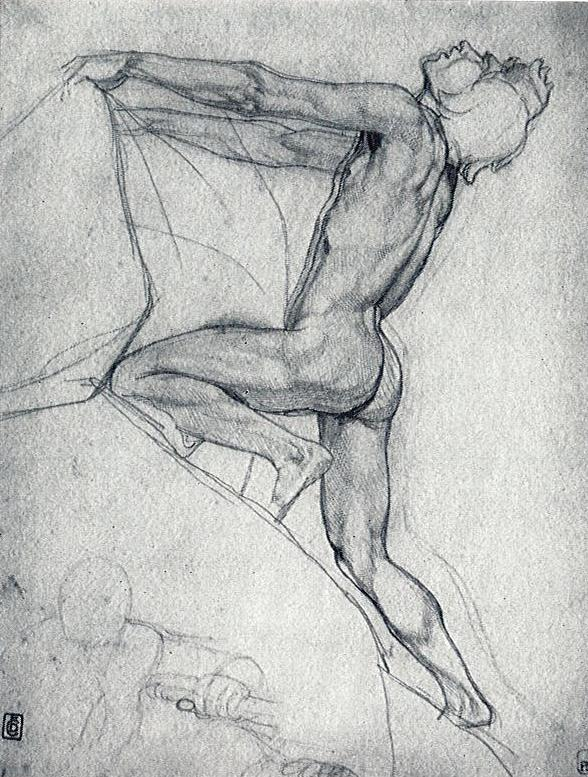
Fyodor Bruni. Young Man Climbing a Rock (drawing for painting The Bronze Serpent)

In the right foreground of the painting, a woman rushes towards her husband in fear and despair. The woman's face bears a resemblance to that of Angelica, Bruni's wife. Such an introduction of the artist's native image into the painting can be seen as a manifestation of romanticism in history painting. This woman is the local centre of the right-hand side of the painting: everyone around her is also gripped by terror. The fact that many people seek protection from their relatives and friends does not quite fit in with the biblical description, according to which it was enough to look at a bronze snake to heal people.

The foreground of the left side of the canvas underwent significant changes during the course of the painting. In early sketches and in the first version (underpainting) of the painting, Bruni depicted a group of four people reaching for the bronze snake — a man carrying an old father, his wife and his son. In the final version of the painting, the group is very different — the son, his leg bandaged from the fatal bite, dying in the arms of his father and mother. Despite the depth of their grief, they do not try to reach the bronze snake: apparently having lost all hope of saving their son.

To her right, a girl bent over the stone. Bruni himself described her as follows: "She is an orphan, robbed of everything on earth. She embraces, half kneeling, a stone. This stone is the only refuge for the wretched. She embraces it, weeping, and waters it with her tears". And the artist continued: "One of her brothers, still an infant, lies beside this stone — grief. I painted him dead of hunger".

To the right of the girl, in the background, the artist has depicted a man leaning over a dying young woman (a bride, according to Bruni). He tries in vain to open her eyes in the hope that she will see the bronze snake. Nearby, leaning over her and putting her hand to the dying woman's heart, is an older woman, her mother.

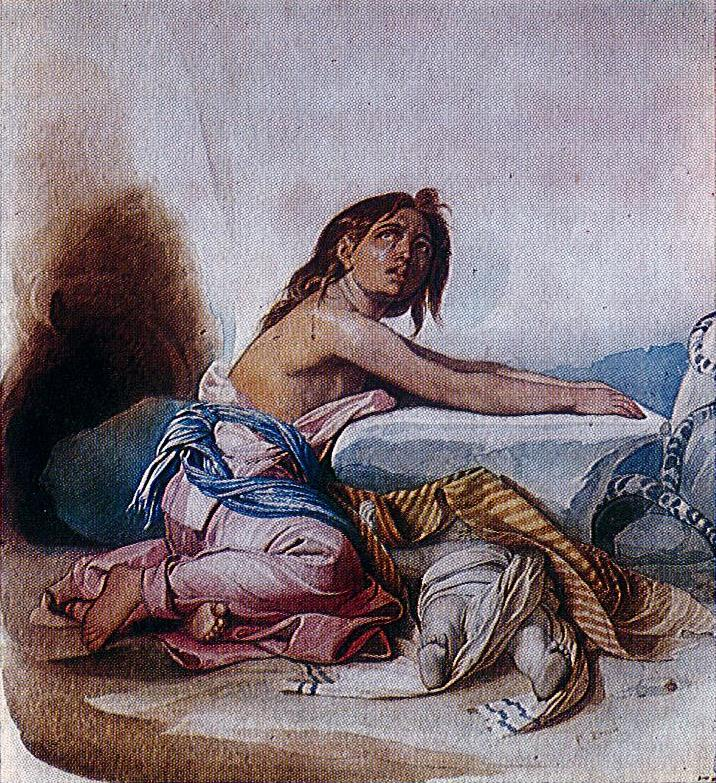
Fyodor Bruni. Girl at the Stone (sketch for the painting "Bronze Serpent")

At the same time, some of the people in the background of the painting are approaching the serpent, searching for salvation. Among them is a mother with an infant, standing at the foot of a column, holding the baby's hands to it. On the right of the painting, a man carries his exhausted wife in his arms, looking hopefully towards the "Brazen Serpent" — dressed in white, she most clearly symbolises religious insight and faith in healing, with Bruni himself characterising her state as "ecstasy".

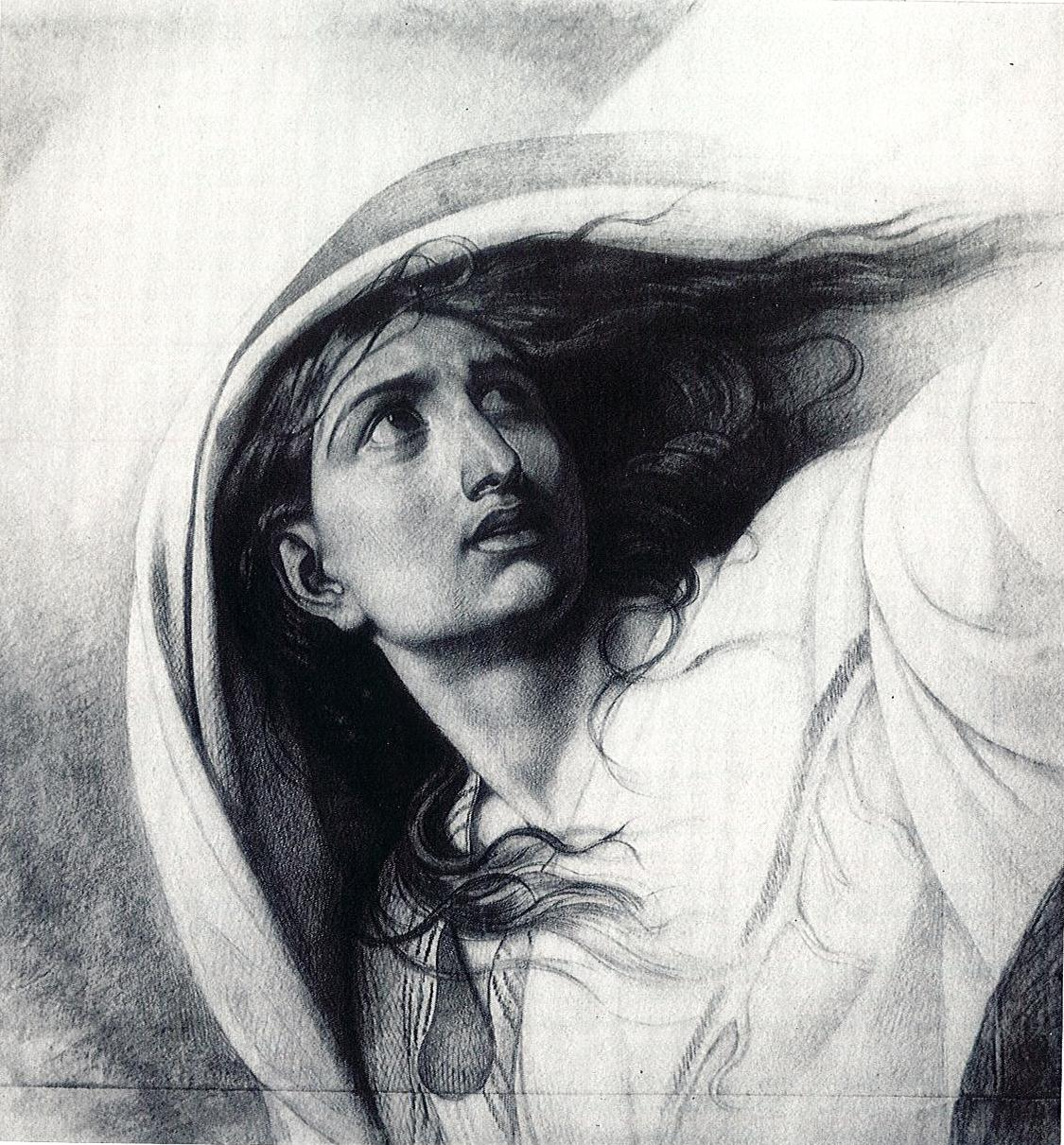
Fyodor Bruni. Woman's Head (sketch for painting "Bronze Serpent")

The mother of two children to her left seems to be looking at this woman. But she is not: in fact she is looking up at the sky from which snakes are falling and, according to Bruni, 'fearing for her children, she wants to cover them with the hollow of her clothes'. Still to the left is a kneeling woman with a dead child in front of her. Although she is facing the bronze snake, there is no faith in redemption in her gaze, only maternal grief and resignation to fate.

As a landscape, Bruni depicted, in his own words, a place 'in the middle of the stony Arabian desert near the Red Sea, where high, steep cliffs rise, the foothills of Mount Or[en]'. As the artist had never been there himself, the whole landscape was painted by his imagination: the rocks and mountains, the earth and the sky. The dark landscape, with storm clouds from which poisonous snakes fall, emphasises the ruthlessness of the punishment and the horror that engulfed the people. In this sense, the landscape plays the role of an actor in the painting. Together with the effects of light and colour, this can be seen as a manifestation of Romanticism in Bruni's classicism painting.

As for the lighting of the painting, it is conditional, since it is impossible to identify a specific source of light. Most of the sky is covered with clouds, with only a small gap visible in the distance, but clearly not enough to illuminate the entire space of the painting. The groups of people in the foreground and background are relatively evenly lit. Nevertheless, some figures seem to be emitting light of their own, such as the woman dressed in white and carried by her husband.

== History ==
Fyodor Bruni worked on the painting for about fifteen years, with the earliest sketch on the subject dating from 1824. In February 1827, Bruni reported to the Society for the Encouragement of Artists (SEA) that he was beginning to work on a large painting based on an Old Testament story. He noted that among his sketches, he had "stopped on one in particular, which I would like to produce in a large painting... it represents the erection of a bronze snake in the desert". The SEA's committee, which generally approved of the artist's idea, tried in the same year to warn him of the difficulties involved in creating a large multi-figure composition, to which Bruni replied that "the figures in the above picture will be life-size... and therefore the whole picture will be quite large, but since it has already begun, I do not want to leave it".

Fyodor Bruni began to work on the final version of the painting "Brazen Serpent" in Italy in 1833-1834. In 1833 he had underpainted a general sketch (cardboard), and in early 1834 he reported that his "painting 'Moses' will soon be finisged" and that "everyone is horrified by its enormity, especially the Germans", but he did not really care: "as soon as we have money, everything would be fine".

In 1835 it became known that Emperor Nicholas I had ordered Fyodor Bruni and Karl Bryullov to return to St. Petersburg "to take up professorships at the Academy of Arts". Since Bruni was still working on the painting "The Brazen Serpent", he tried to postpone the date of his departure from Italy, and the diplomat Nikolai Guriev, who was an envoy to Rome at that time, interceded for him. As a result, Bruni's departure was postponed until the beginning of 1836, but he did not finish the painting.

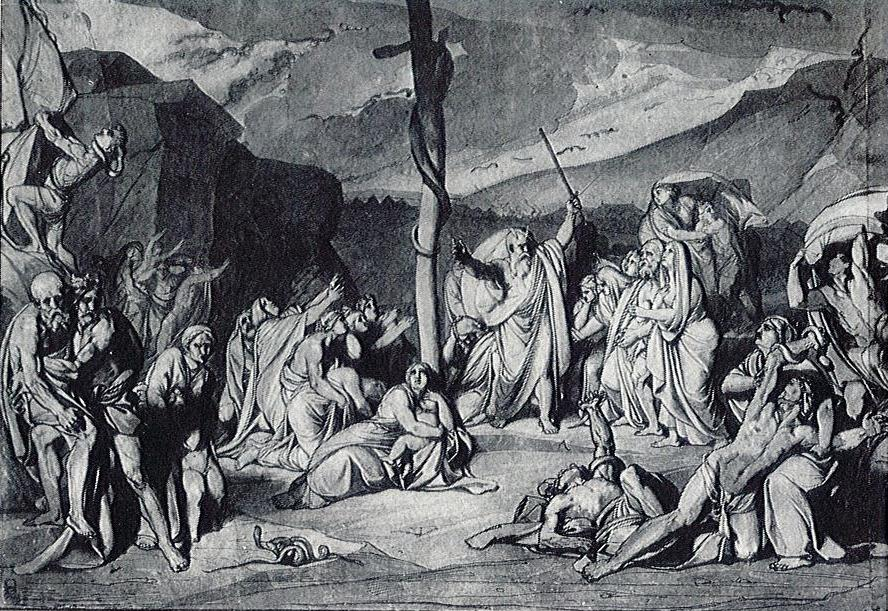
Fyodor Bruni. Brazen Serpent. Sketch (about 1828, State Russian Museum of Fine Arts)

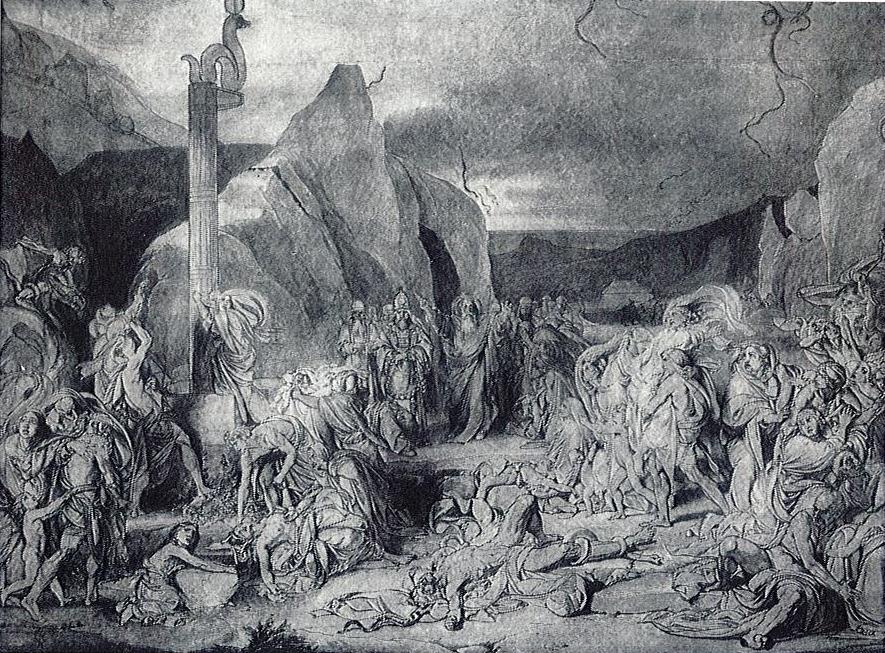
Fyodor Bruni. Brazen Serpent.. Sketch (before spring 1836, State Russian Museum)

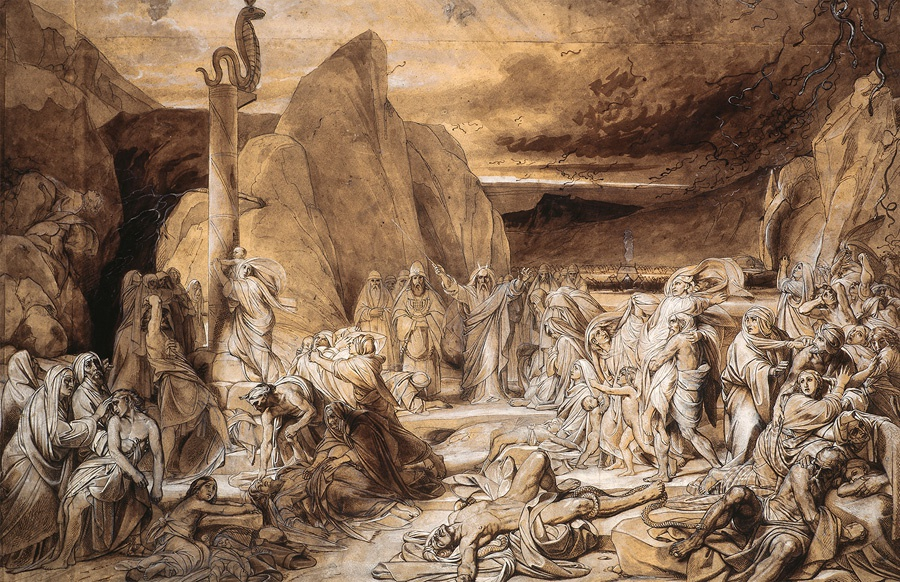
Fyodor Bruni. Brazen Serpent. Final Sketch (1839, State Tretyakov Gallery)

In the summer of 1836, Fyodor Bruni returned to Russia, where he was appointed professor at the Academy of Arts. At the Academic Exhibition in the fall of 1836, he exhibited his sketches for "Brazen Serpent", which aroused great interest and were noted in the press. In 1837–1838, Bruni continued to work at the Academy, but spoke of his desire to return to Italy to complete a major painting. In the end, the highest permission was obtained, the documents were drawn up, and in September 1838 Bruni went to Rome with his wife Angelica and his one-and-a-half-year-old daughter Teresa.

From 1838, Fyodor Bruni continued to work on the painting in Rome. In 1839, he wrote a letter to the Minister of the Imperial Court, Peter Volkonsky, complaining about the difficult financial situation due to the fact that he had stopped paying his salary. By that time his family had grown — his son Alexander was born. However, Nicholas I initially refused, ordering that payments be suspended until Bruni returned to Russia. In the fall of 1839, Bruni wrote a second petition, pointing out that he was working continuously and "with all his energy" on a large painting "Moses", but the situation was such that "in this situation I must no longer think about my great painting — the only purpose of my trip to Italy, and the daily livelihood of my family, to which I must devote all my work. After this, the emperor changed his mind and ordered the resumption of the payment of salaries, "but in order that next year himself to bring here next year to complete his painting".

Nevertheless, by the fall of 1840, the painting was not ready, and Bruni again had to ask for a postponement, this time until the following spring. Finally, April 15, 1841, he reported that "a large, depicting Moses painting, the execution of which necessitated my trip to Rome, is completely finished". At first the canvas was exhibited in Rome. Being there, Alexander Ivanov wrote that "here everyone was pleased, especially the Italians, but the Germans destroyed it in his journal" — Ivanov meant a Nazarene movement led by Johann Friedrich Overbeck. Bruni wrote: "As for me, I am delighted at the universal success my work has had".

At the end of June 1841, the painting “Brazen Serpent” was sent to Russia. In September of the same year it was exhibited in the Winter Palace, and some time later it was moved to the Academy of Arts. There in the fall of 1842 began its public exhibition. Emperor Nicholas I liked the painting and purchased it for 30,000 rubles in assignments (according to other reports, it was purchased for 70,000 rubles), and the artist himself was awarded the Order of St. Vladimir of the 4th level.

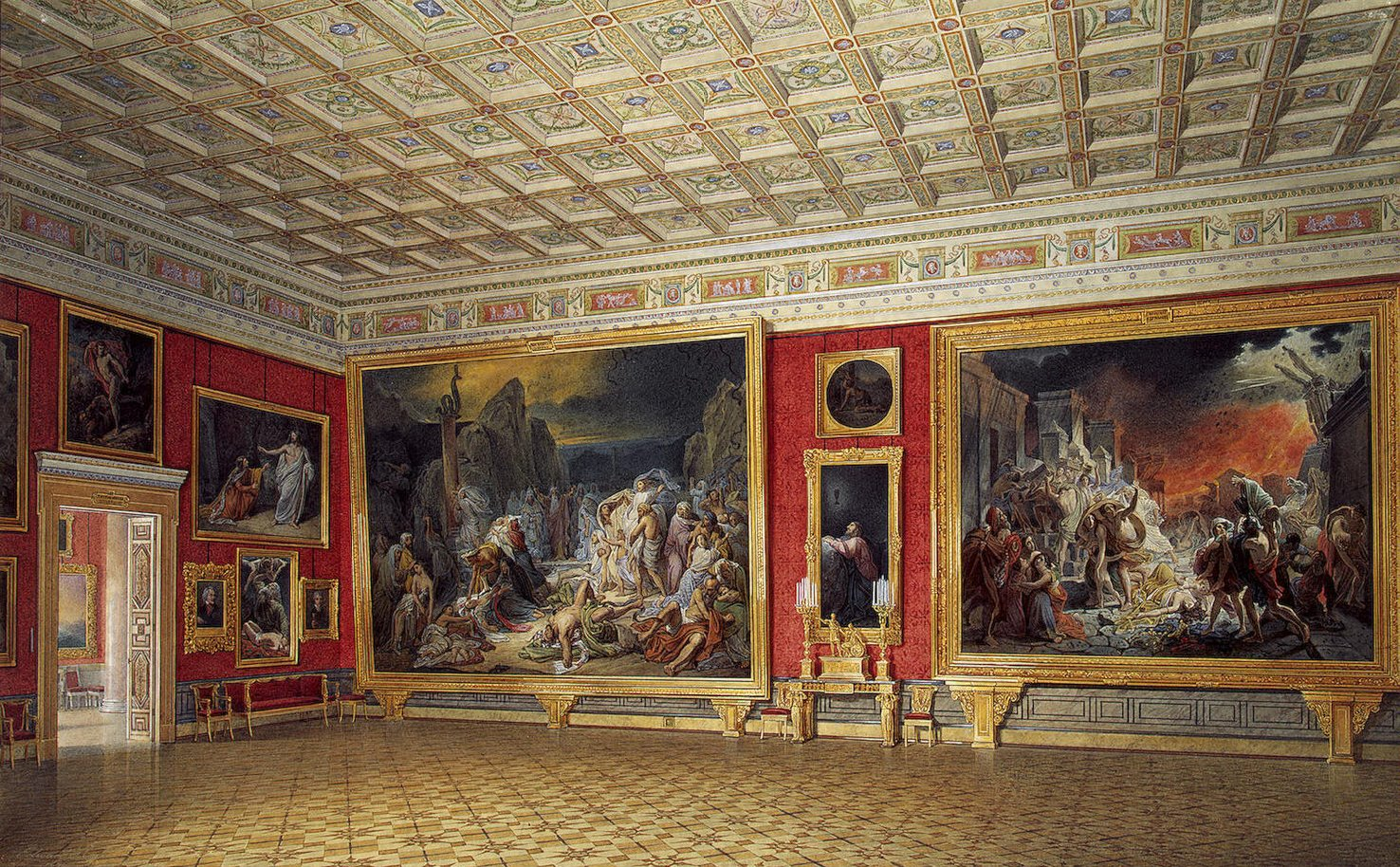
Eduard Gau, Hall of the Russian School in the New Hermitage, modern-day Snyder's Hall (room 245), 1856; Hermitage Museum

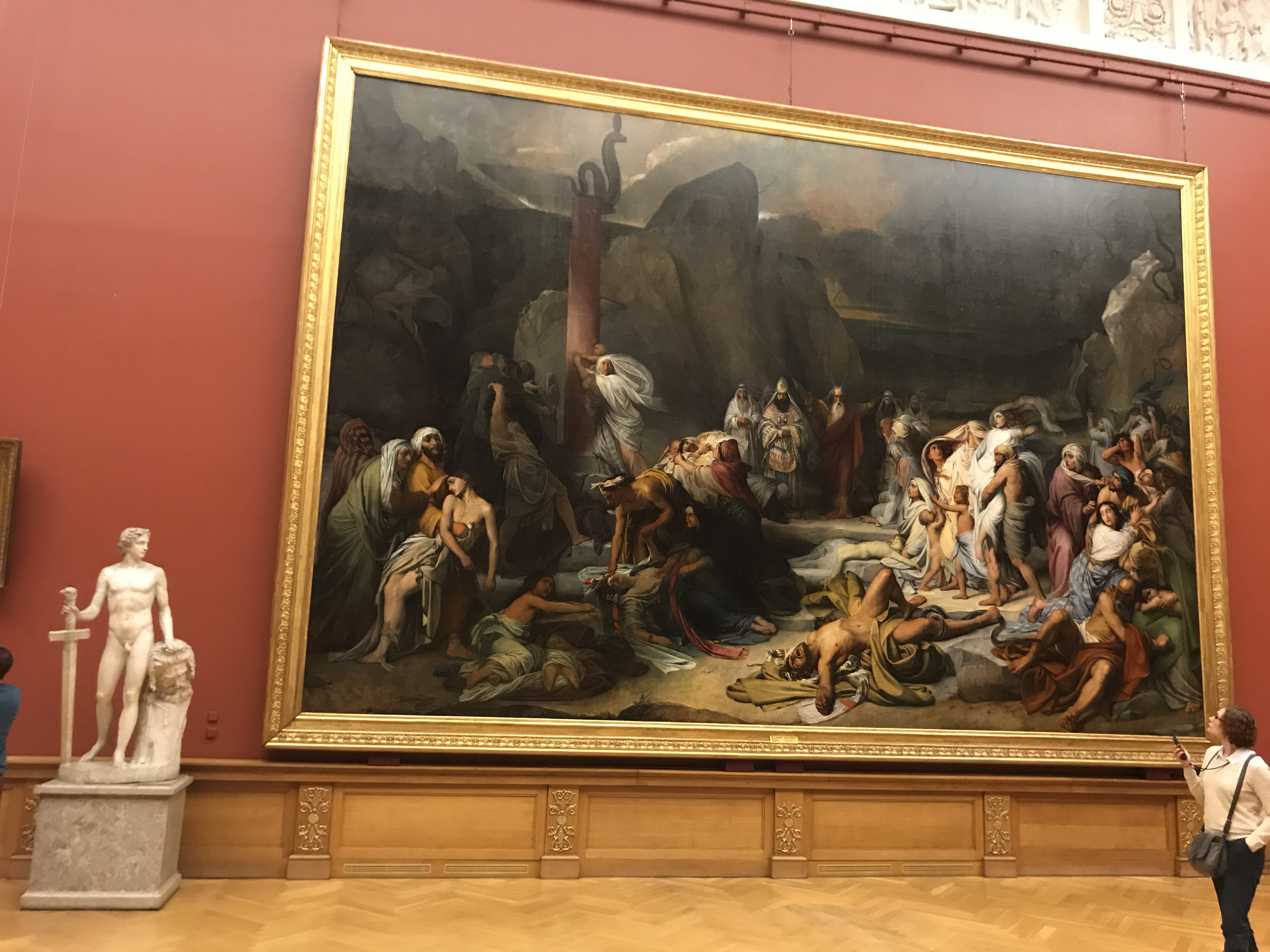
The Brazen Serpent on display in the Russian Museum

After that, the painting was in the Russian School Hall of the Hermitage. In 1897, it was transferred to the then emerging Russian Museum of Emperor Alexander III (now the State Russian Museum), where it is still located. After the opening of the museum in 1898, it was exhibited in the Mikhailovsky Palace, in the same room with another painting by Bruni, "The Death of Camilla, Sister of Horace". According to the recollections of Alexander Benois, in the same room were "The Last Day of Pompeii" and "The Siege of Pskov" by Bryullov, "Christian Martyrs in the Colosseum" by Flavitsky, "Christ's Appearance to Mary Magdalene after the Resurrection" by Ivanov, "Last Supper" by Ge, and two or three other paintings by Aivazovsky. Referring to the fact that both in the Hermitage and after its transfer to the Russian Museum, "Brazen Serpent" was placed next to "The Last Day of Pompeii", Alexander Benois wrote: "Both colossi of Russian painting found a place on the same wall <...>, as if these giants were actually paired works".

During the II World War some paintings from the collections of the State Russian Museum were evacuated to Molotov (Perm). For such large-format paintings as "Brazen Serpent", wooden shafts up to 10 meters long and 60 to 120 cm in diameter were specially made, on which they were wound. These shafts were made of plywood on a wooden frame covered with artificial chamois.

From February 2000 to December 2002, a large-scale restoration of the painting was carried out, aimed at strengthening the canvas, the paint layer and the ground, as well as cleaning the darkened varnish layer. The work on the painting "Brazen Serpent" was carried out by a specially created team of the Russian Museum's Restoration Department, which included Andrei Bogomolov, Anton Makarov and Alexander Minin. As a result, the appearance of the painting was brought as close as possible to the coloristic intentions of its author. After the restoration was completed, an exhibition was held in early 2003, which, in addition to the updated "Brazen Serpent", included the cardboards used by Bruni in preparation for the painting.

Nowadays, The Brazen Serpent is exhibited in the Hall 15 of the Mikhailovsky Palace, where, in addition to it, are exhibited "The Heroism of the Young Kiev" by Andrey Ivanov, "Testing the strength of Jan Usmar" by Grigory Ugryumov, "Christ's Appearance to Mary Magdalene after the Resurrection" by Alexander Ivanov, as well as his sketches and studies for the painting "The Appearance of Christ to the People".

== Reviews and critics ==
In the early 1900s, the Silver Age painter and writer Alexandre Benois wrote that "influenced by the grandiose success of Brullov" (meaning the success of the painting "The Last Day of Pompeii"), Bruni "took on a picture of equally colossal size: for his "Brazen Serpent", which was completed in 1840 and had the same success in Rome as "Pompeii", but a little less in St. Petersburg". In another book by Benois, "The Russian School of Painting", a whole chapter is devoted to a comparative characterization of Bruni and Brullov, mainly on the example of the paintings in question. In particular, he noted that "Bruni, in the splendor of his seasoned and almost flawless skill, leaves far behind him the uneven and often tasteless Brullov," but the reason for Bruni's less popularity is that he is inferior to Brullov in temperament. And further Benois explained: "his [Bruni's] art quite satisfied the requirements of the state, won the admiration of connoisseurs, but did not possess the means to impress the masses — something that Brullov's work undoubtedly possessed".

The literary historian and censor Alexander Nikitenko wrote in his diary on 27 October 1841: "I went to the palace and saw Bruni's painting 'Brazen Serpent'. I expected much more. It is a picture of various deaths, and where is the poetic idea of Moses with his miracle? Moses glimmers in the distance with a vague shadow, and all you see are heaps of dying people, depicted with horrifying truth. The artist was obviously concerned not with the artistic but with the anatomical truth of the figures".

The literary critic Stepan Shevyryov said that Bruni's painting inseparably combined two thoughts: religious and pictorial. The religious thought was connected with the depiction of what miracle true faith can perform to save suffering people, and the pictorial thought was aimed at "depicting the physical suffering of the distressed people". On this basis, Shevyryov believed that "the main action of the painting" was connected with the image of the woman being carried by her husband: on her face "a ray of healing has already shone". At the same time, according to Shevyryov, by depicting a man lying in agony in the centre of the painting, the artist "wanted to present us with a gloomy picture of unbelief".

Another literary critic, Vasily Botkin, noted that "opinions about this painting are divided: some see it as a deeply respectable work of the professor, others — the creation of a high talent. He himself believed that "the reason for such a difference of opinion lies in the fact that the artist did not give himself a thorough account of the idea of his painting, and the lack of internal, lively content was replaced by a dramatic variety of details", while emphasising that "art first of all requires a definite and itself clear idea".

The poet and pedagogue Alexander Balasoglo wrote: "The raising of the brass snake in the desert by Moses" is a huge work, the first painting in the Academy of Arts in terms of size. Effect, movement, fire, scenes, feelings, reflections, talent, expression: there is an abyss, the work is colossal. It can be appreciated only by long study of parts; there are treasures in them, but the general thought of the composition and the main execution: they are obvious. The soul is saddened by the general suffering and longs for a miracle".

Art historian Alla Vereshchagina, Bruni's biographer during the Soviet era, wrote that he 'proved himself an artist sensitive to the tragic worldview of the Russian people of that time' (the 1820s, when the painting was conceived, and the 1830s, when Bruni worked on it). She continued: 'He found an artistic image that fully expressed his idea... He showed all his innate ability, gave all the strength of his soul, all his talent'.

== Bibliography ==
- Бенуа А. Н. История русской живописи в XIX веке. — М.: Республика, 1995. — 448 p. — ISBN 5-250-02524-2.
- Бенуа А. Н. Русская школа живописи / Н. Н. Дубовицкая. — М.: Арт-Родник, 1997. — 334 p. — ISBN 978-5-88896-019-6.
- Боткин В. П. Литературная критика, публицистика, письма. — М.: Советская Россия, 1984. — 317 p. — (Библиотека русской критики).
- Верещагина А. Г. Федор Антонович Бруни. — Л.: Художник РСФСР, 1985. — 256 p.
- Петинова Е. Ф. Русские художники XVIII — начала XX века. — СПб.: Аврора, 2001. — 345 p. — ISBN 978-5-7300-0714-7.
- Степанова С. С. Русская живопись эпохи Карла Брюллова и Александра Иванова: Личность и художественный процесс. — СПб.: Искусство-СПб, 2011. — 288 p. — ISBN 978-5-210-01638-6.
- Яковлева Н. А. Русская историческая живопись. — М.: Белый город, 2005. — 656 p. — (Энциклопедия мирового искусства). — ISBN 5-7793-0898-5.
- Государственная Третьяковская галерея — каталог собрания / Я. В. Брук, Л. И. Иовлева. — М.: СканРус, 2005. — V. 3: Живопись первой половины XIX века. — 484 p. — ISBN 5-93221-081-8.
- каталог (1980). Государственный Русский музей — Живопись, XVIII — начало XX века. Аврора; Искусство.
