= Zeno.org =

German-language digital library

Zeno.org (German pronunciation: [ˈtseno dɔt ˈɔʀɡ]) is a digital library with German texts and other content such as pictures, facsimile, etc., which has been started by the Zenodot Verlagsgesellschaft mbH, a German publishing house and sister enterprise of Directmedia Publishing GmbH. The content is based on the digital libraries from the CDs and DVDs published by Directmedia, The Yorck Projekt and Zenodot. It uses a stable mirror of the German Wikipedia, purchasable as German language Wikipedia DVD-ROM. Since its official start in September 2007, it is the largest fulltext online digital library in the German language.

Since 2008, Zeno.org does not belong anymore to Zenodot; it is meanwhile owned by Contumax. The content of Zenodot and its sister company DirectMedia Publishing remains nonetheless available.

The text content of Zeno.org is given partly with facsimiles. All the literature and encyclopedias are citable since text sources, page numbers and permanent links to the single pages are quoted.

== See also ==
- Similar or comparable projects:
  - Google Book Search
  - Open Library
  - Project Gutenberg
  - Projekt Gutenberg-DE
  - Wikisource

== Sources ==
- Agon S. Buchholz: „Die Digitale Bibliothek macht Ernst mit Open Access“. In: kefk.org, 12 July 2007 (German).
