= Mikhail Alpatov =

Soviet historian and art theorist

- Born: Mikhail Vladimirovich Alpatov; 10 December 1902; Moscow, Russian Empire
- Died: 9 May 1986 (aged 83); Moscow, Soviet Union
- Education: Moscow State University (1921)
- Occupation: Historian

Mikhail Vladimirovich Alpatov (Russian: Михаи́л Влади́мирович Алпа́тов; 10 December 1902 – 9 May 1986) was a Soviet historian and art theorist, notable for his contribution to the history of the culture of ancient Rus.

== Biography ==
Alpatov graduated from Moscow State University, where he studied the history of arts from 1919 and 1921. Subsequently, he worked at the Museum of Fine Arts in Moscow, and, from 1923 to 1930, in the Institute of Archeology and Art History of the Academy of Sciences. In 1943 he became a professor at the Surikov State Institute of Arts, also in Moscow. In 1954, he became a member of the USSR Academy of Art. He died in 1986.

== Work ==
Beginning in the 1920s, Alpatov was primarily engaged in researching the culture and art of the Byzantine Empire and of ancient Rus. Later, he also turned to the Renaissance, and to the general theory of culture. He advocated that art history is a reflection of history itself, a kind of "applied history". He discovered deep connections between old Russian art, in particular, Andrei Rublev, and Byzantine and Greek art.
