= Directmedia Publishing =

German publishing house

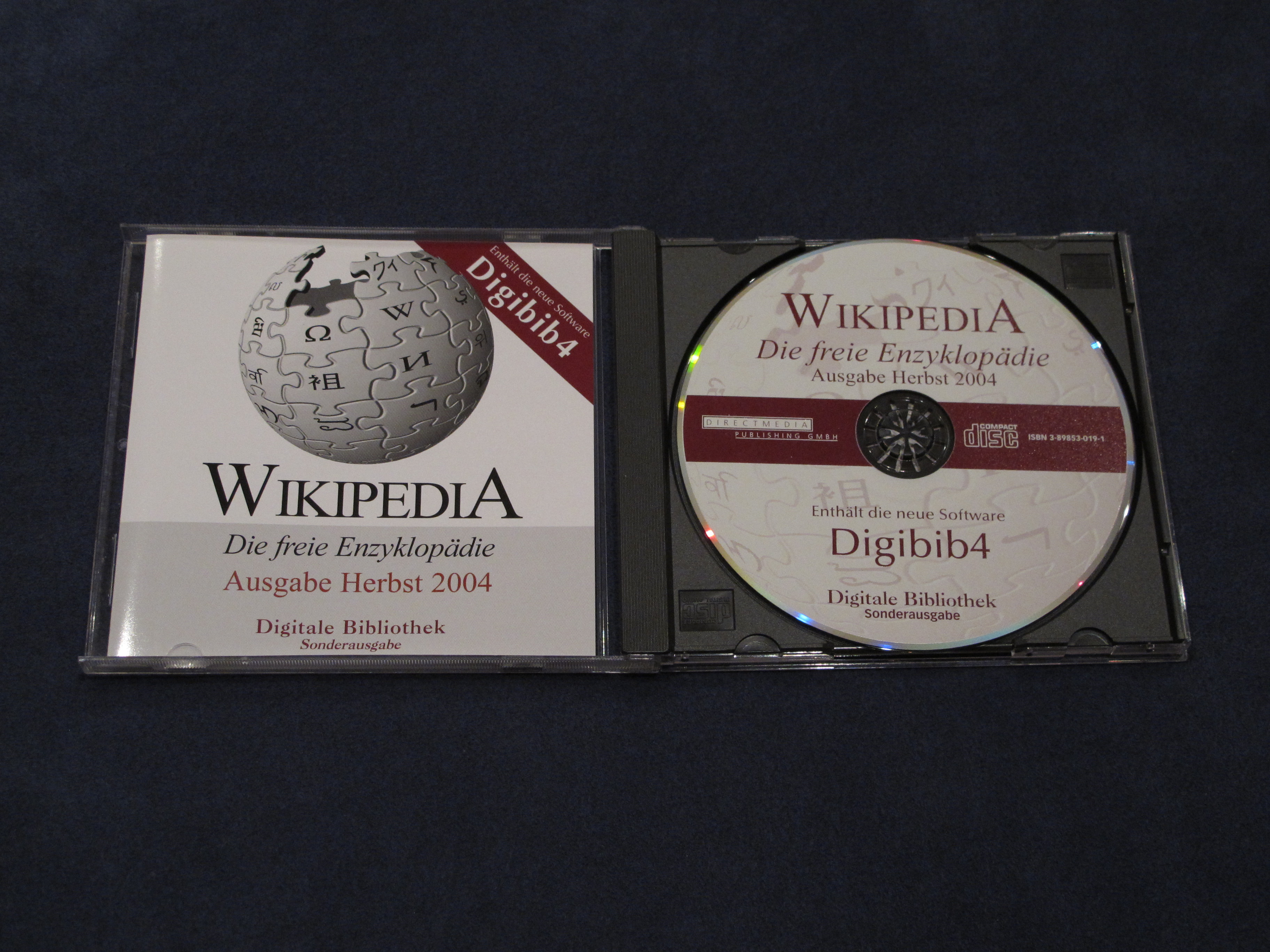
German Wikipedia CD

Directmedia Publishing is a German publishing house created in January 1995 by Ralf Szymanski and Erwin Jurschitza as a publisher of digital media. The emphasis of the publishing house's content lies within the field of digital libraries, particularly scientific collections of texts, and encyclopaedias.

In co-operation with the Reclam publishing house in Stuttgart, Directmedia Publishing published the series Reclam Klassiker auf CD-ROM (Reclam classical authors on CD-ROM), which presents individual works of the German language literary canon. The first German Wikipedia CD was published by Directmedia Publishing in October 2004, and was followed by a DVD-ROM (and CD-ROM) in April 2005. In the first ten days the second edition was presold, 10,000 copies were purchased, 8,000 on Amazon.de.

Directmedia's sister enterprise, The Yorck Project (based in Yorck road, Berlin), specialises in the publication of CDs or DVDs with extensive picture collections including art, photography and historical illustrations. The software used to display content runs under Microsoft Windows and Mac OS X, with a beta version for Linux also available. In April 2005, Directmedia contributed scans of 10,000 public domain paintings to the Wikimedia Commons project. In 2007 The Yorck Project was renamed to Zenodot Verlagsgesellschaft mbH and started the online digital library Zeno.org in October 2007.

In 2008 Directmedia Publishing and its sister Zenodot were sold and transferred to Brașov (Romania), led by Claudia Maria Buflea. Zeno.org is meanwhile owned by a non-related company named Contumax. The content of Zenodot and DirectMedia Publishing remains nonetheless available.
