= Last Supper (Ge) =

1863 painting by Nikolai Ge

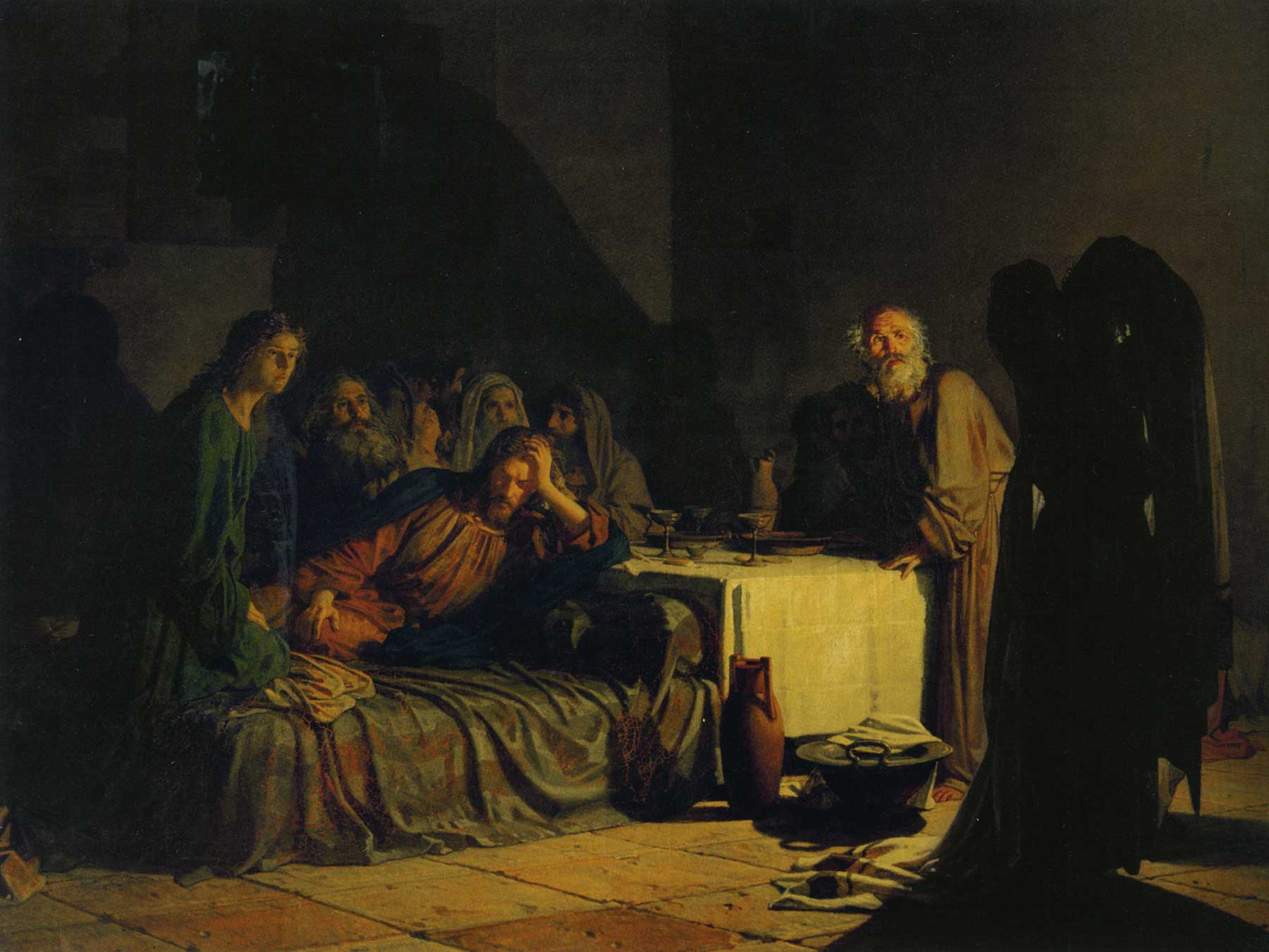
- Artist: Nikolai Ge
- Year: 1863
- Location: Russian Museum, Saint Petersburg

The Last Supper (Russian: Тайная вечеря) is a painting by the Russian painter Nikolai Ge (1831–1894), completed in 1863. It is part of the collection of the State Russian Museum in Saint Petersburg (inv. Zh-4141). The size of the picture is 283 × 382 cm.

Ge worked on the painting from 1861 to 1863 in Florence during his artistic trip abroad. After Ge brought the painting to Saint Petersburg, it was exhibited at the Academic Exhibition in 1863. The Council of the Imperial Academy of Arts praised the artist's skill in painting, and awarded him the title of professor of history painting, and the work was purchased by Emperor Alexander II for the Museum of the Academy of Arts.

The painting depicts the Last Supper, described in the New Testament, the last meal of Jesus Christ with his twelve apostles, during which he predicted that one of them—Judas Iscariot—would betray him. This subject was popular among artists in the field of Christian art; renditions this scene were created by, among others, Leonardo da Vinci, Salvador Dalí, Domenico Ghirlandaio, Andrea del Castagno.

The painting was a success, though it was much debated and critics differed. Some approved of its innovative interpretation of the Gospel story, while others believed that the images of Christ and the apostles had strayed too far from traditional understanding, and were not depicted convincingly enough.

Nikolai Ge created at least two smaller author's replicas of the painting, one of which belongs to the collection of the State Tretyakov Gallery, and the other is in the Radishchev Art Museum in Saratov.

== Prerequisites ==
The Last Supper of Jesus and the Twelve Apostles has always been a popular theme in Christian art, often in the life cycle of Christ. The first images of the Last Supper date back to early Christianity, examples of which can be found in Roman catacombs.

Images of the Last Supper of Jesus Christ were created in both the Eastern and Western churches. As a result, the plot of the Last Supper became extremely popular with artists of the Italian Renaissance. Later, it was one of the main subjects of Lutheran altarpieces for several decades after the Reformation.

During the Quattrocento, many artists created several compositions of the Last Supper. Among the significant examples is a composition created by Andrea del Castagno (c. 1421 - † 1457). He worked hard and checked the location of the characters in the picture for a long time, took care of the decorativeness of the work as if he were an extraordinary decorator. Domenico di Bigordi created his own composition on the same subject.

There is a real library of materials about the creation of the composition "The Last Supper" by the artist Leonardo da Vinci. Contemplating the forthcoming Last Supper, Leonardo not only performed essays, but also recorded his thoughts on the actions of individual participants in this scene: hands and with frowning eyebrows looks at his friend, the other shows the palms of his hands, raises his shoulders to his ears and expresses surprise with his mouth… »

Salvador Dali's painting combines typical Christian themes with modern surrealist approaches and contains geometric elements of symmetry and polygonal proportions.
