= List of Scottish Americans =

This is a list of notable Scottish Americans, including both immigrants who obtained U.S. citizenship and their American descendants.

To be included in this list, the person must have a Wikipedia article showing they are Scottish American or must have references showing they are Scottish American and are notable.

== Artists ==
- Alexander Anderson, illustrator
- Earl W. Bascom, cowboy artist and sculptor
- Alexander Calder, sculptor
- Herbert A. Collins, landscape and portrait painter
- John M. Donaldson, artist and architect
- Leslie Erganian, artist and author
- John Mackie Falconer, etcher, painter, and watercolorist
- Joseph Glasco, abstract expressionist painter, draftsman and sculptor
- Tim Gunn, author, academic, and television personality who served on the faculty of Parsons School of Design
- Tommy Hilfiger, fashion designer
- Jackson Pollock, artist
- Christopher Ross, sculptor, designer and collector
- Arthur Fitzwilliam Tait, artist

== Business and philanthropy ==
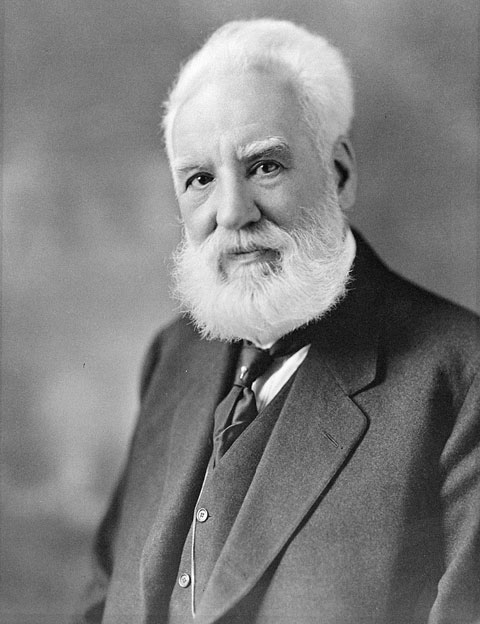
Alexander Graham Bell

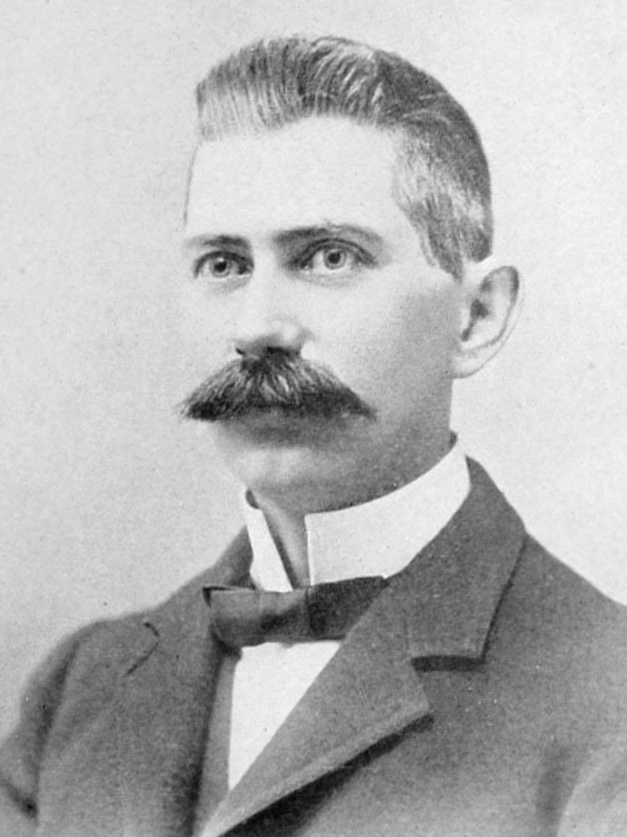
David Dunbar Buick

- Alexander Graham Bell, founder of AT&T
- Philip Danforth Armour, founder of Armour and Company, a meatpacking firm
- William M. Blair, financier
- Glen Bell, founder of Taco Bell
- David Dunbar Buick, founder of the Buick Motor Company
- William Wallace Cargill, businessman and founder of Cargill Incorporated
- Andrew Carnegie, philanthropist and steel
- Jasper Newton "Jack" Daniel, founder of Jack Daniel's Tennessee whiskey distillery
- David Eccles, Utah's first millionaire
- John Malcolm Forbes, businessman and sportsman
- John Murray Forbes, railroad magnate, merchant, philanthropist and abolitionist
- William Cameron Forbes, investment banker and diplomat
- Jay Gould, railroad developer
- Archibald Gracie, shipping magnate
- W.K. Kellogg, industrialist, founder of the Kellogg Company
- James Lenox, philanthropist, bibliophile whose books became part of the founding collection of the New York Public Library
- Malco(l)m McLean, 'Father of Containerization'
- Cyrus McCormick, International Harvester
- Harold Fowler McCormick, businessman
- Ira O. McDaniel, cotton merchant, farmer and newspaper man
- Rupert Murdoch, Australian-born chairman and director of NewsCorp
- Allan Pinkerton, detective and director of a security business
- Ross Perot, entrepreneur, founder of Electronic Data Systems and Perot Systems
- Alexander Turney Stewart, dry goods entrepreneur
- Arch West, executive; developer of Doritos

== Entertainment ==
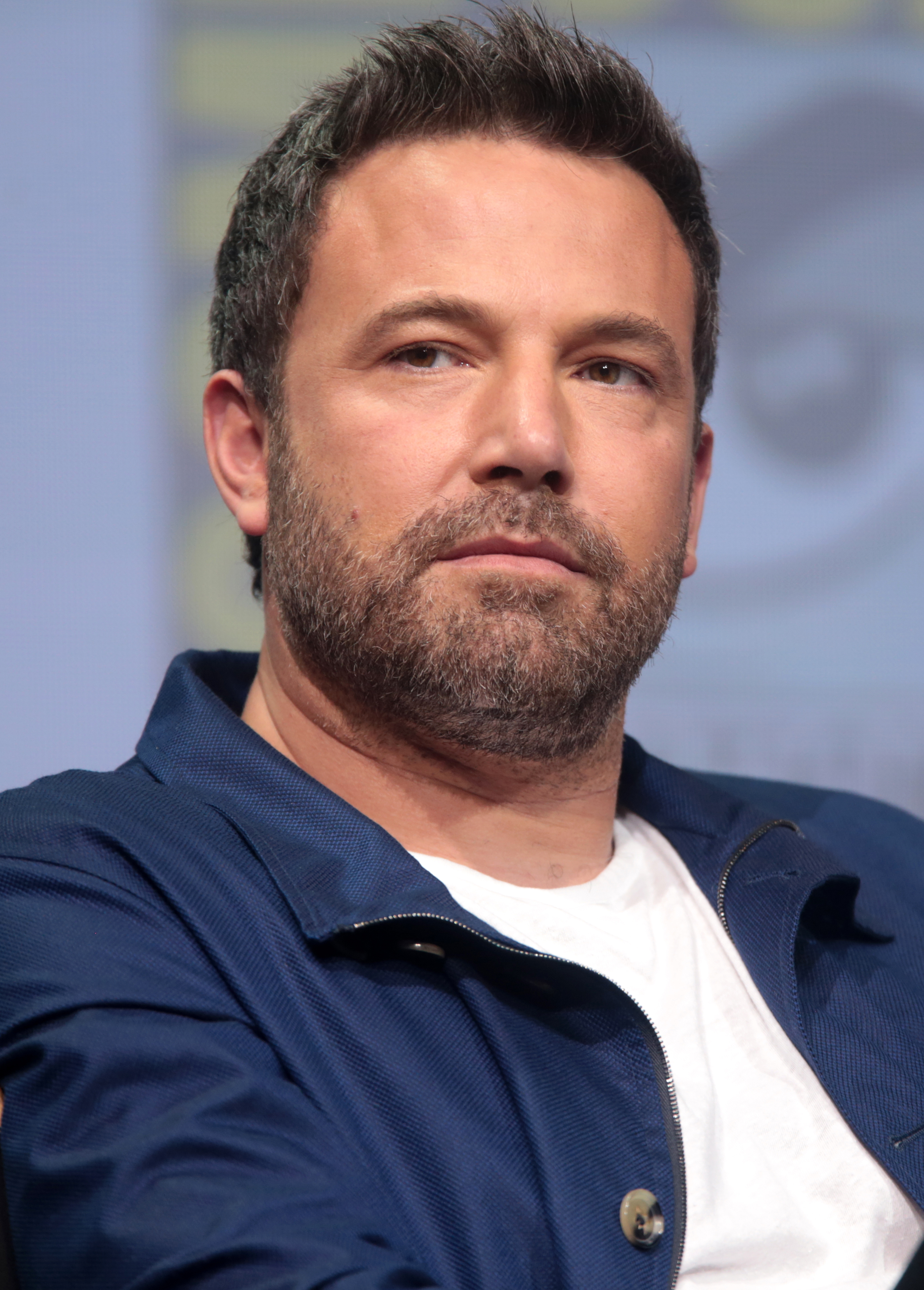
Ben Affleck

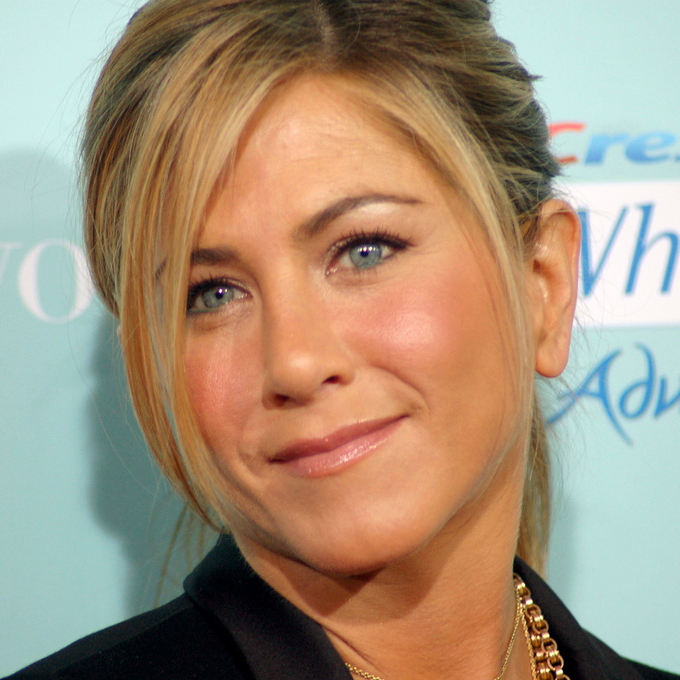
Jennifer Aniston

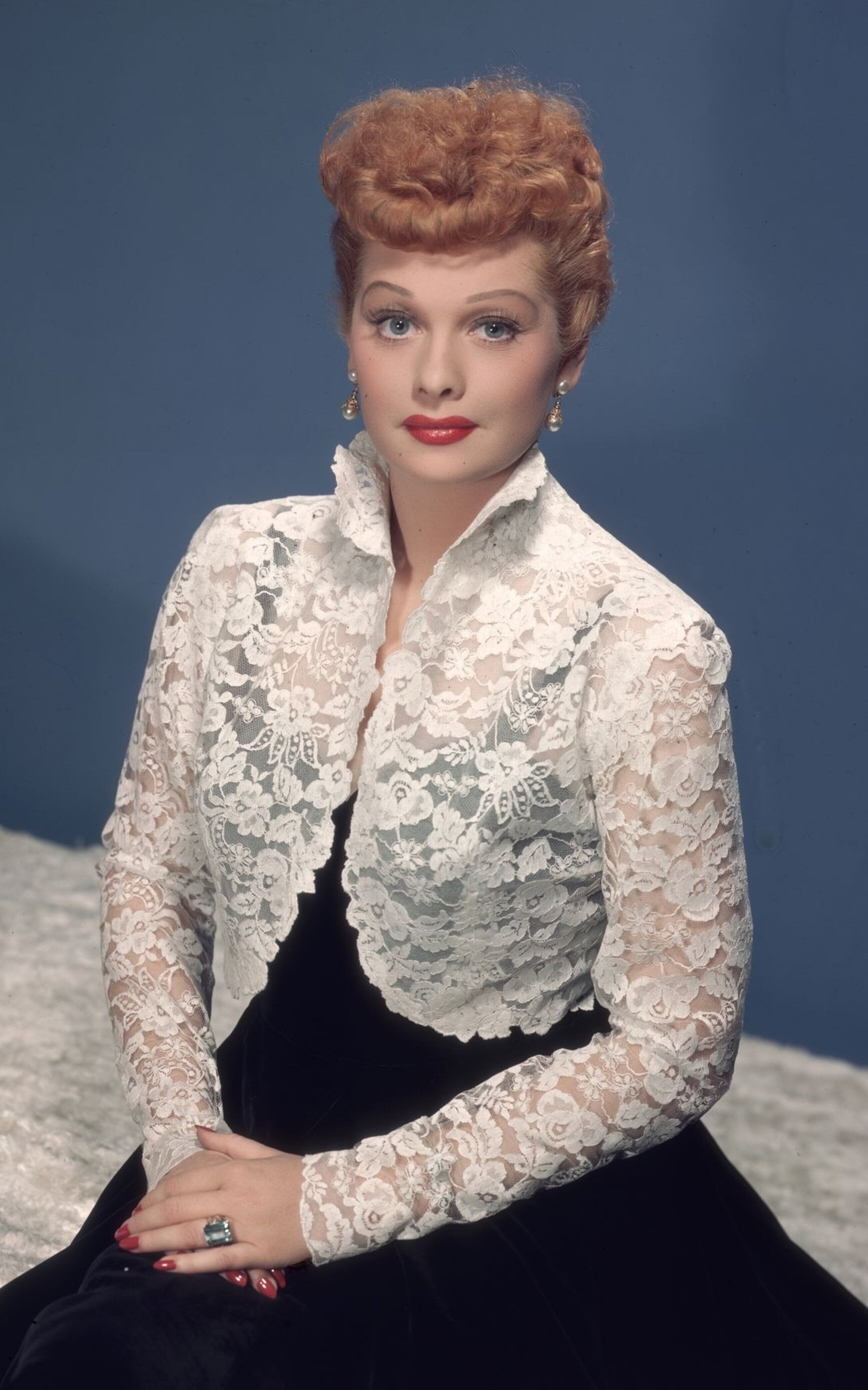
Lucille Ball

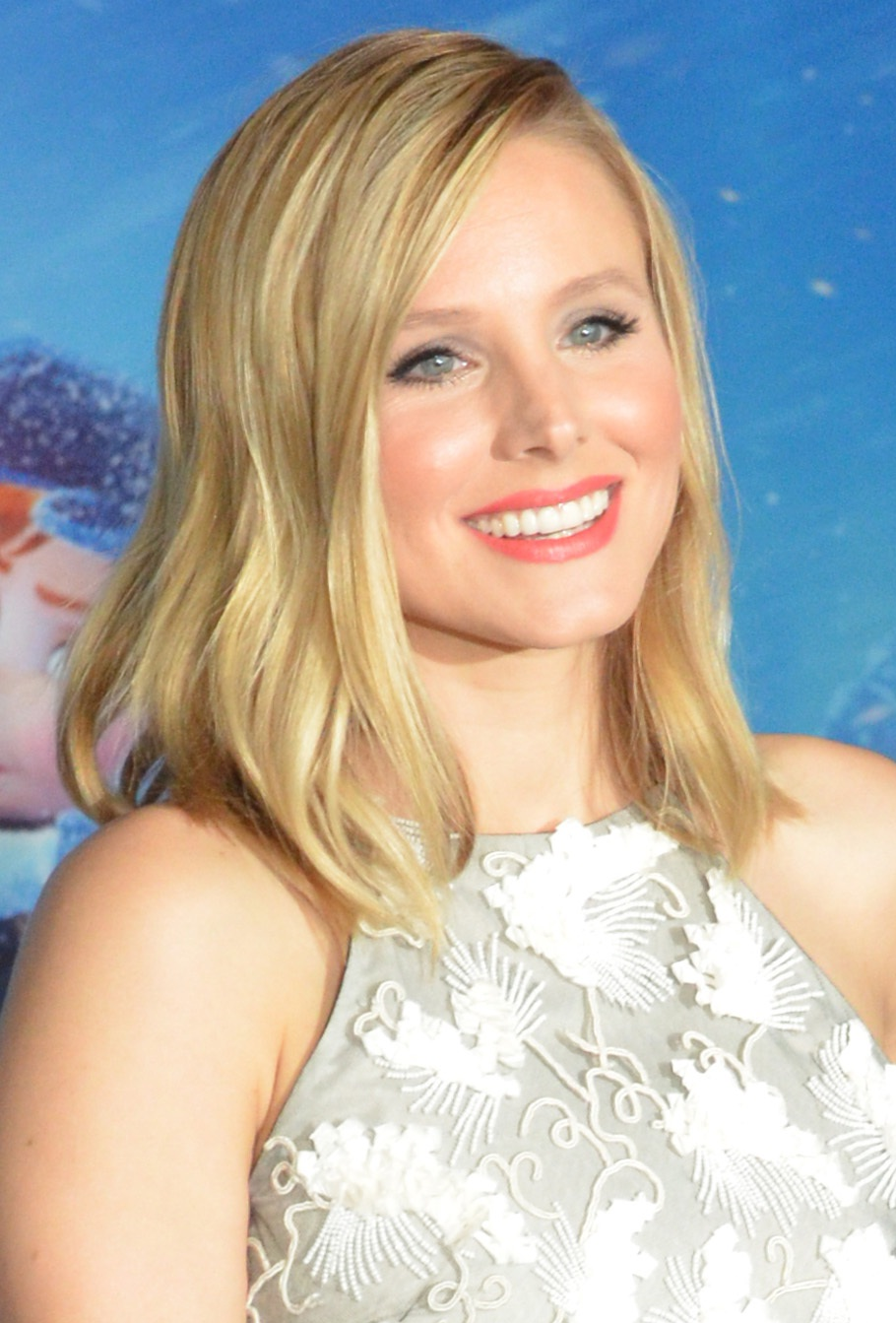
Kristen Bell

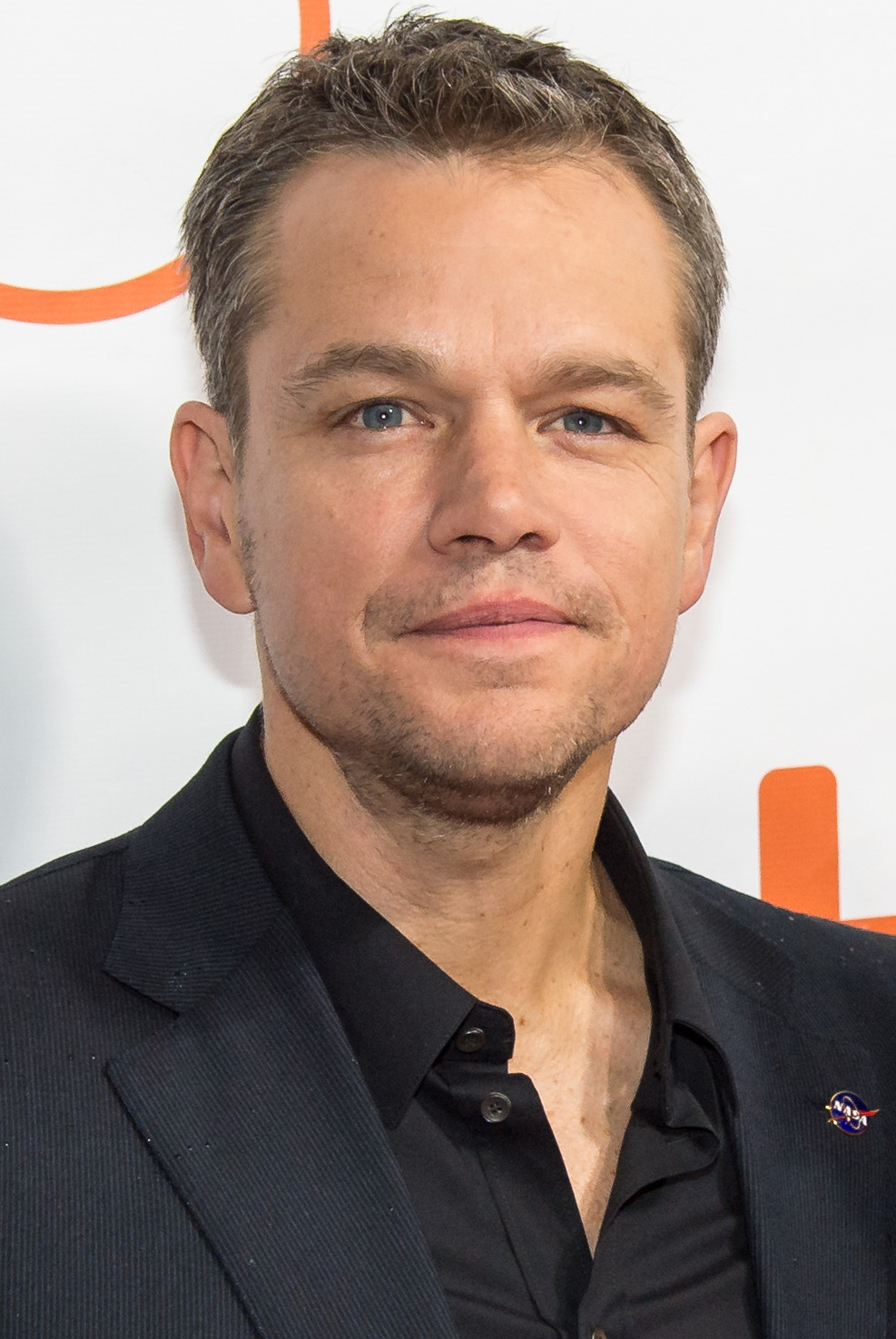
Matt Damon

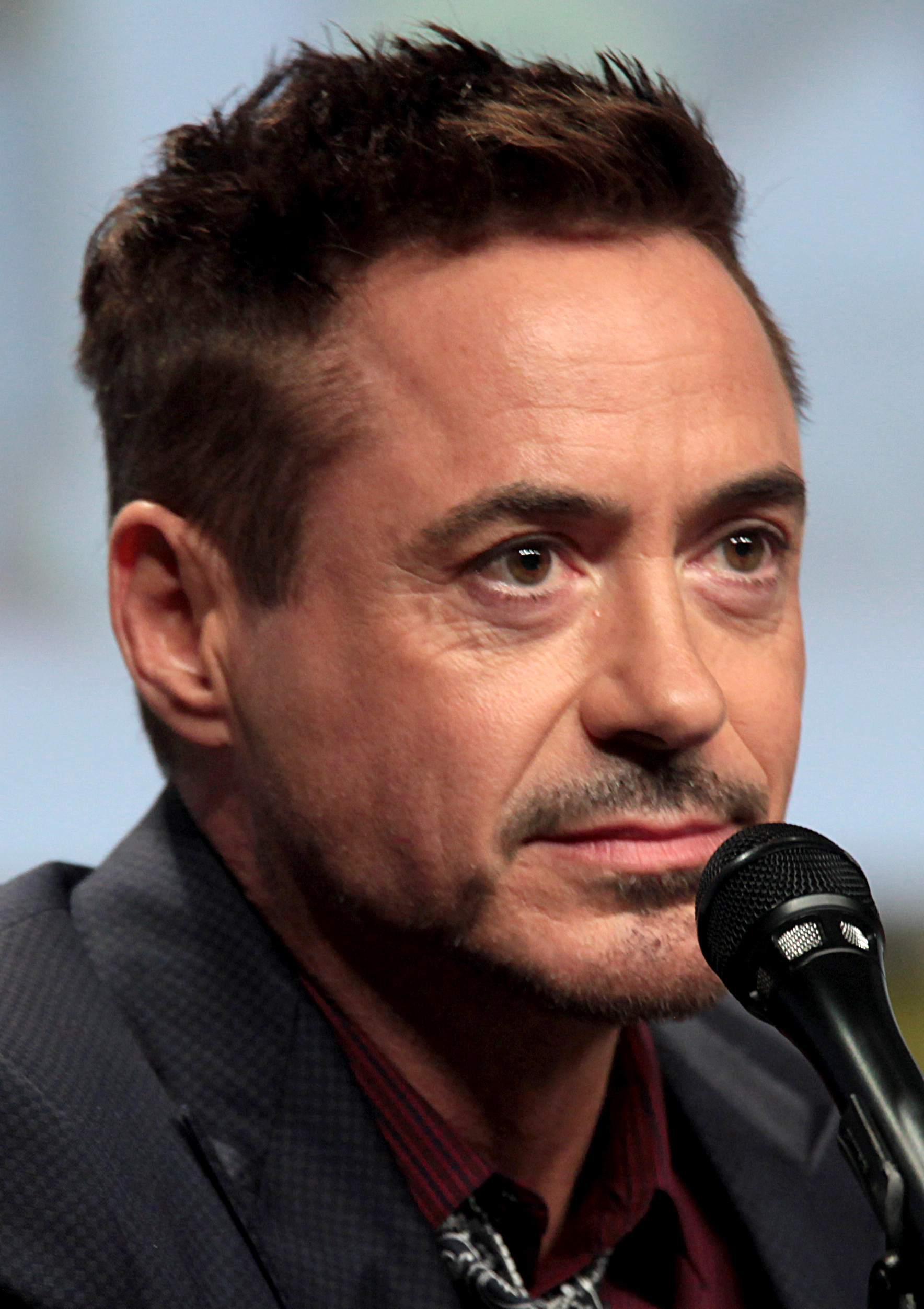
Robert Downey Jr.

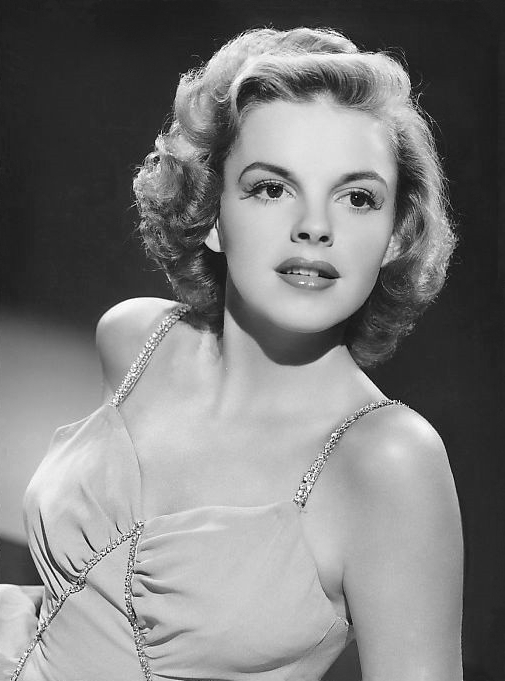
Judy Garland

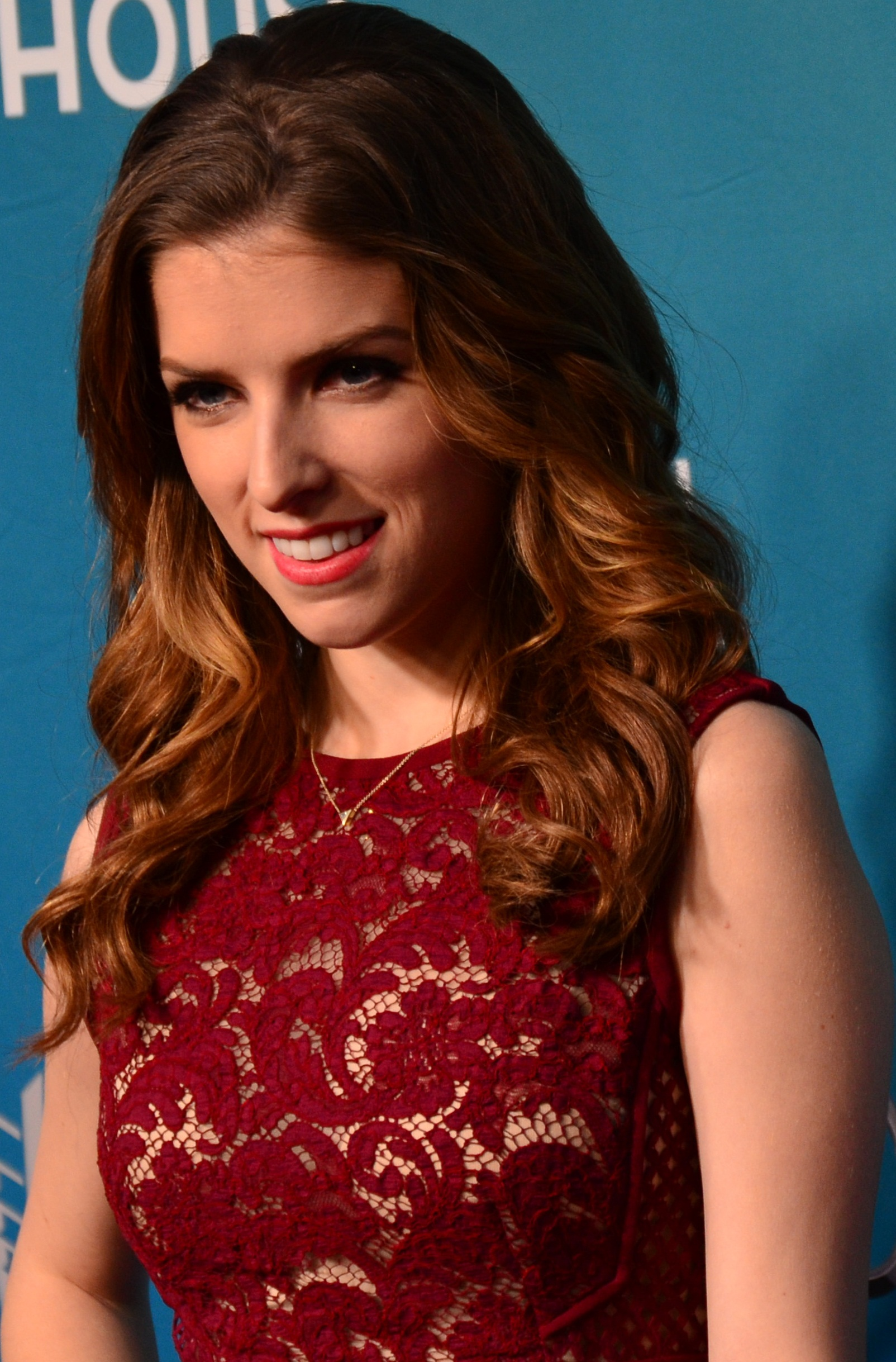
Anna Kendrick

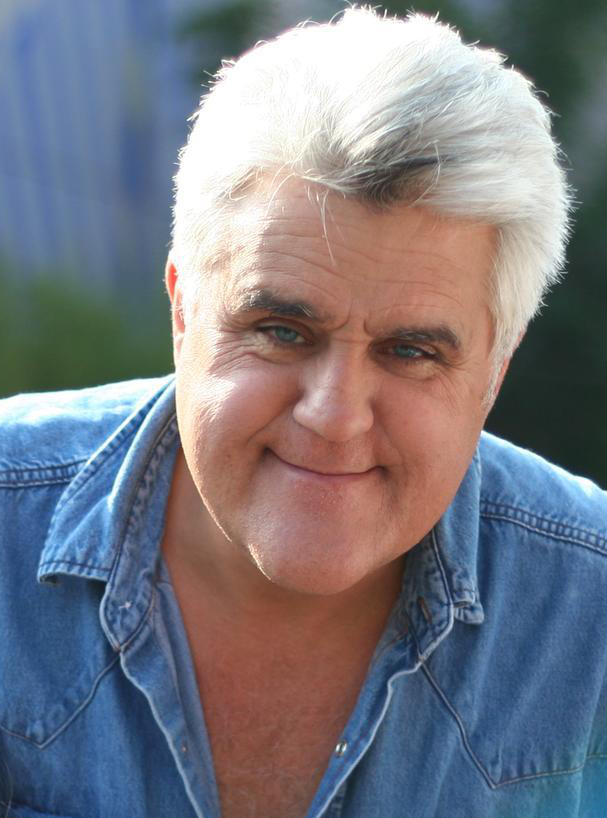
Jay Leno

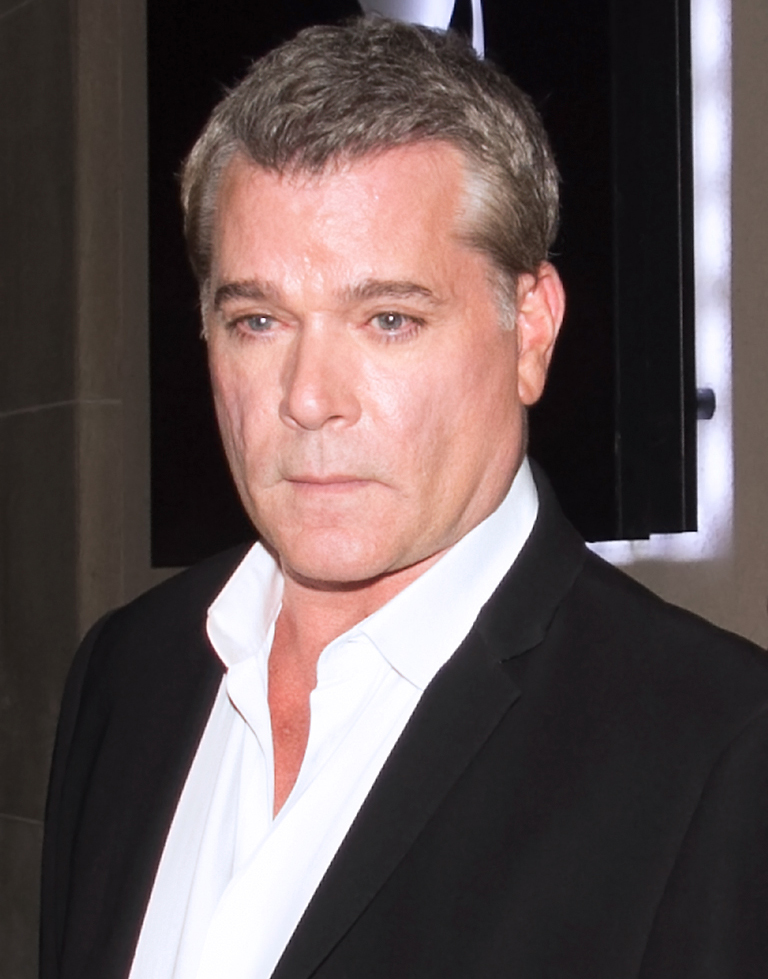
Ray Liotta

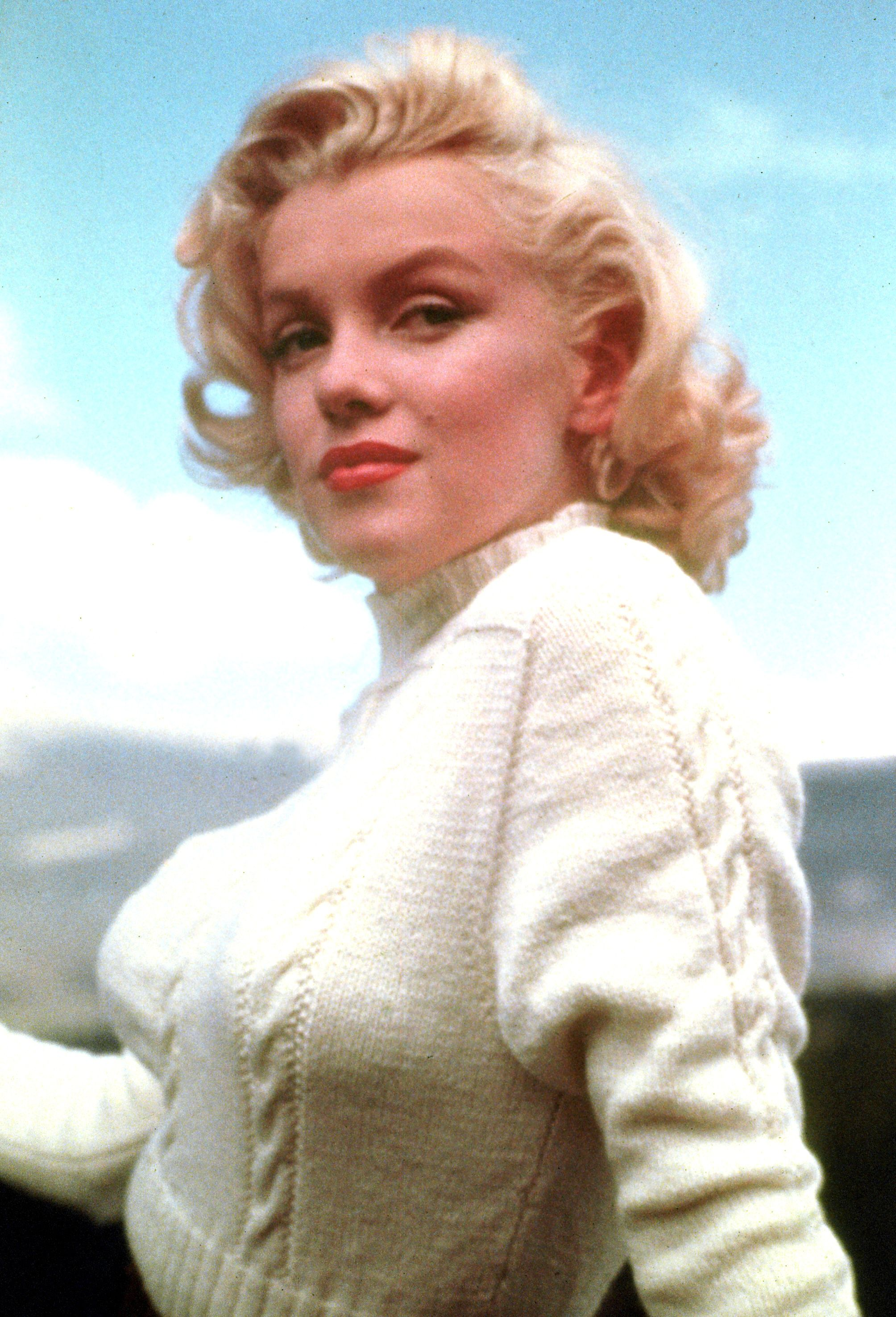
Marilyn Monroe

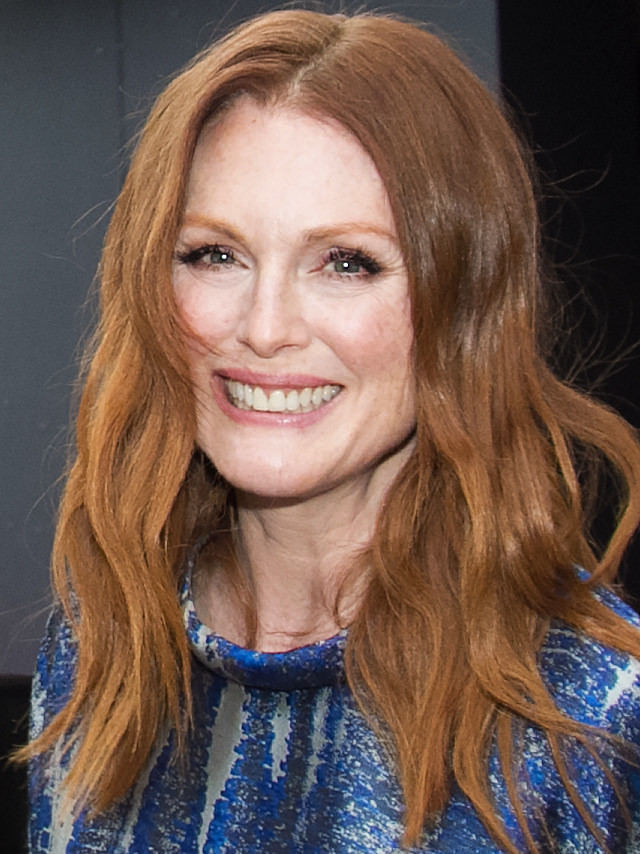
Julianne Moore

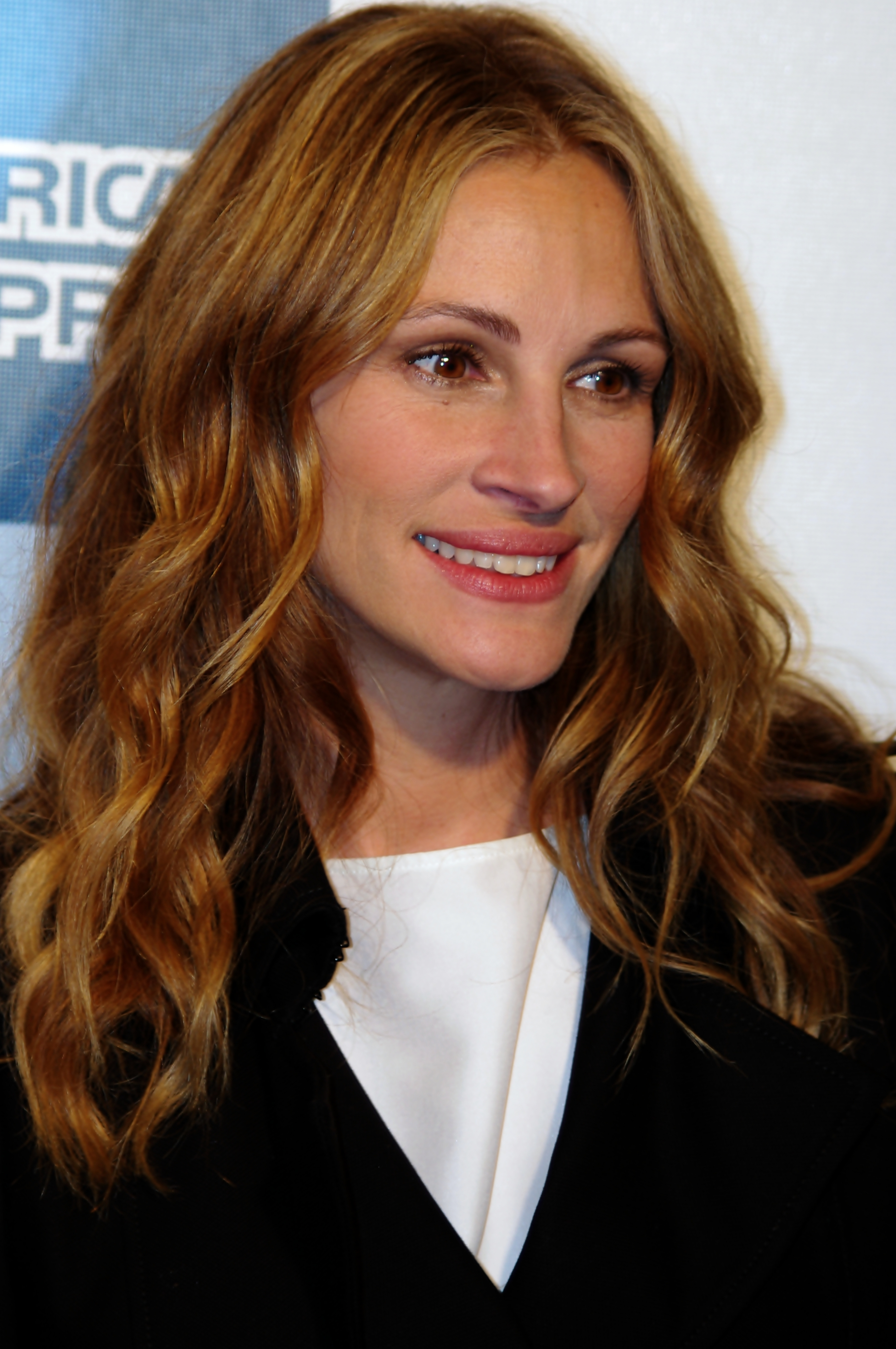
Julia Roberts

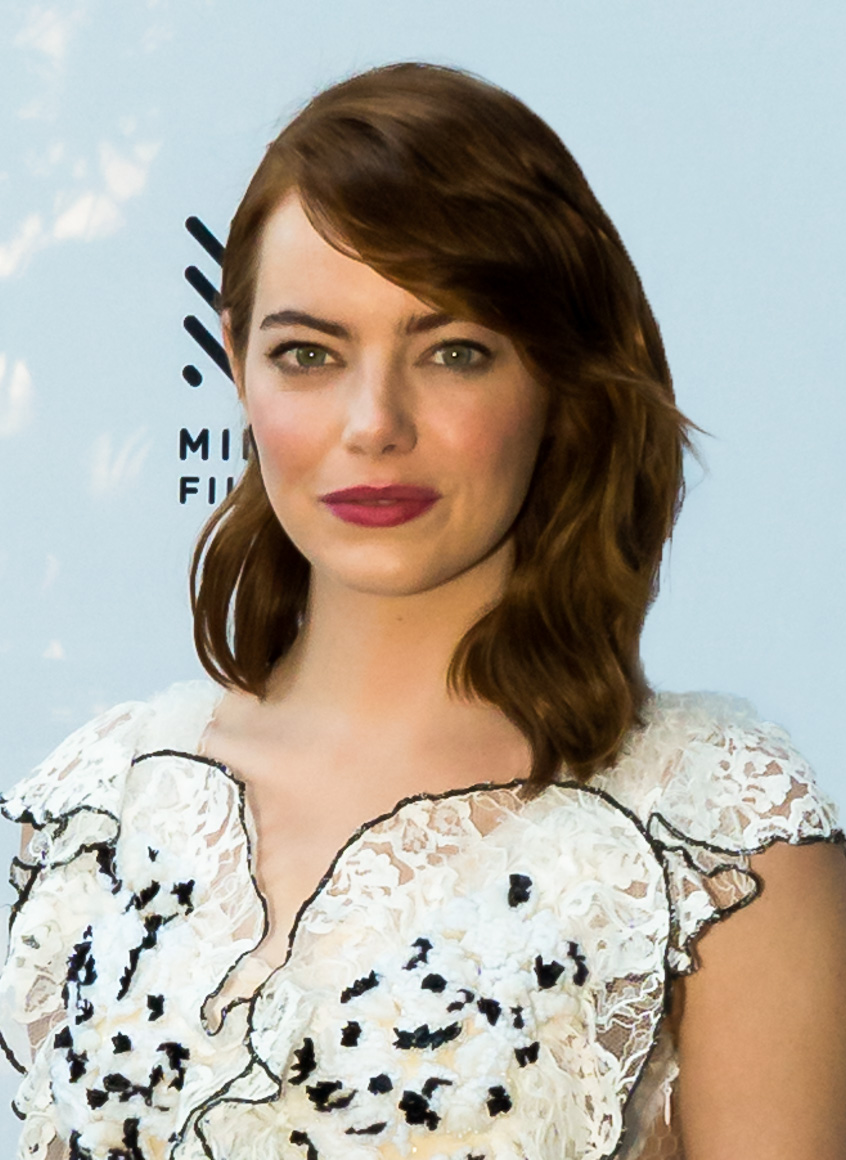
Emma Stone

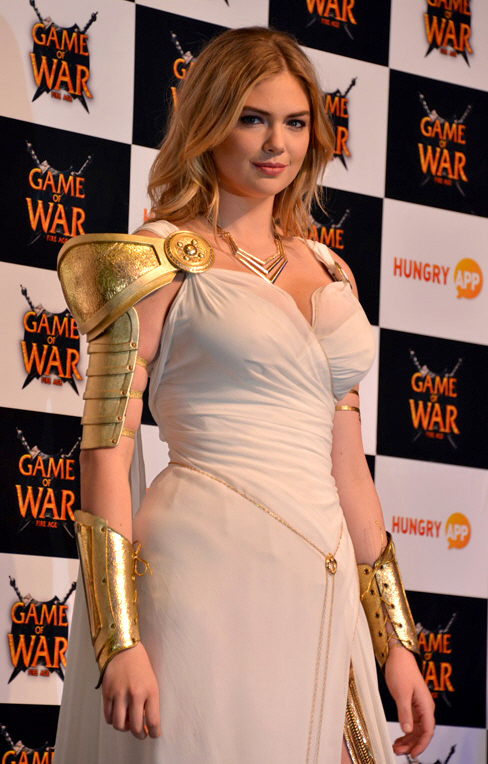
Kate Upton

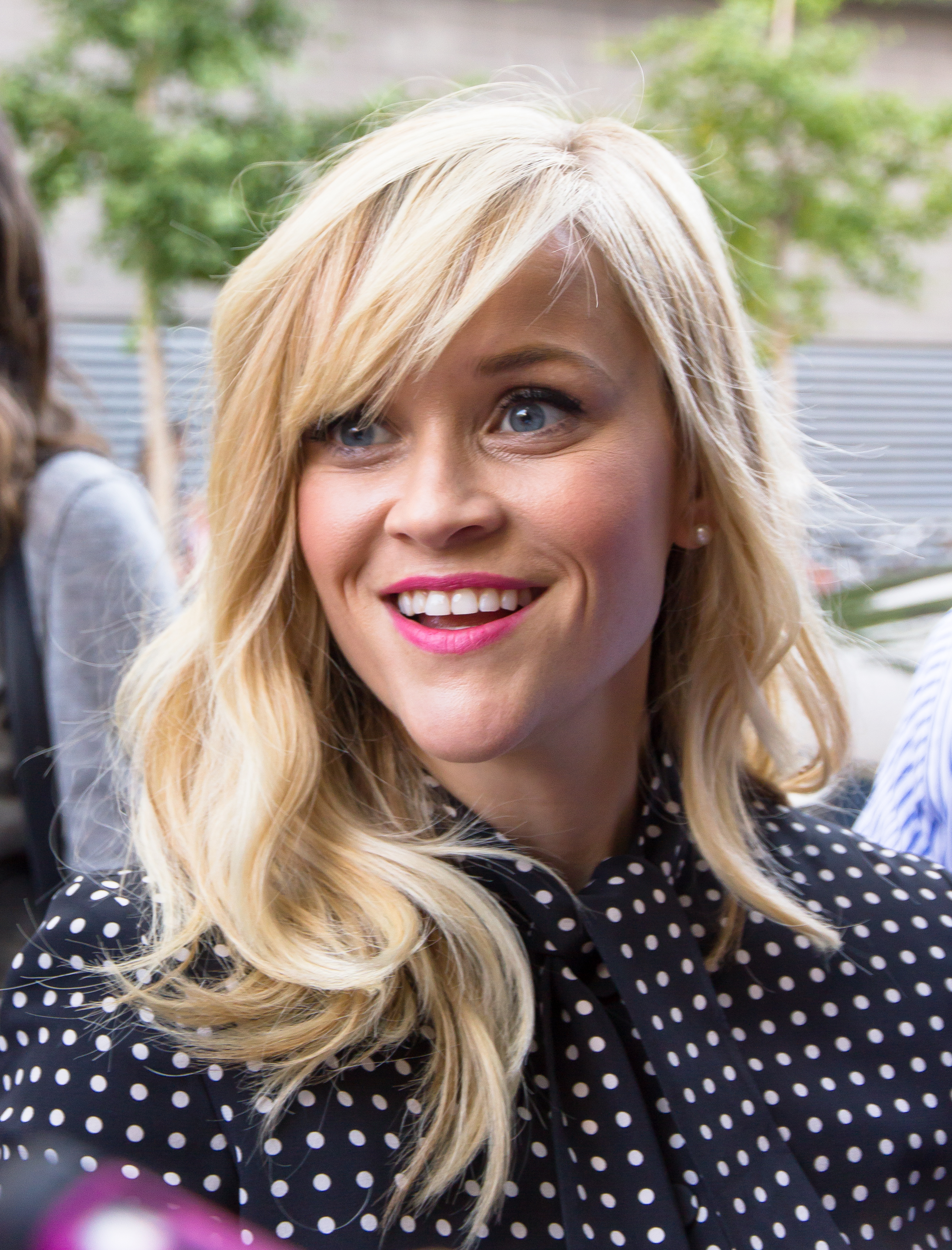
Reese Witherspoon

- Jensen Ackles, actor
- Ben Affleck, actor, writer, director
- Casey Affleck, actor
- Richard Dean Anderson, actor
- Muriel Angelus, actor
- Jennifer Aniston, actor
- Karen Allen, film and stage actress
- Andrew Arbuckle, actor
- Macklyn Arbuckle, actor
- Roscoe Arbuckle, actor, director, screenwriter
- Robert Armstrong, actor
- Samaire Armstrong, actress best known for her roles in The O.C. and Dirty Sexy Money
- Mary Astor, actor
- Clara Bow, actress
- Harry Belafonte, actor, singer
- Lucille Ball, actress and comedian
- Hailey Baldwin, model, television personality
- Alison Brie, actress
- Tallulah Bankhead, actor
- Al Barr, musician
- Luna Blaise, actress
- Cate Blanchett, actress
- Patricia Breslin, actress
- Haley Bennett, actress, singer
- John Barrowman, actor
- Earl W. Bascom, painter, printmaker, sculptor, cowboy, rodeo performer, inventor, and actor
- Catherine Bell, actress and model
- Scott Clifton, actor, musician
- Kristen Bell, actress
- Alexis Bledel, actress
- Jordana Brewster, actress
- James Brolin, actor
- Samantha Brown, television host on the Travel Channel
- James D. Brubaker, film producer, production manager and actor
- Gina Carano, actor and mixed martial artist
- Jim Carrey, actor
- Myra Carter, actor
- Lacey Chabert, actress
- Charles Coburn, producer
- Chris Connelly, musician
- Miriam Cooper, silent film actress
- Stewart Copeland, drummer in the band The Police
- Laird Cregar, actor
- Matt Damon, actor
- Ted Danson, actor
- Mona Darkfeather, actor
- Yvonne De Carlo, actor
- James Dean, actor
- Laura Dern, actress
- Vin Diesel, actor
- Matt Dillon, actor
- Joanie Dodds, fashion model
- Shannen Doherty, actress
- Helen Douglas, actress and politician
- Michael Douglas, actor and film producer
- Gary Dourdan, actor (CSI: Crime Scene Investigation)
- Nancy Dow, actress
- Robert Downey Jr., actor
- Hilary Duff, actress and singer
- Minnie Driver, actor
- David Duchovny, actor
- Daniel Ducovny, director
- Robert Duvall, actor
- Leslie Easterbrook, actor
- Clint Eastwood, actor and instructor
- Aaron Eckhart, actor
- George Eldredge, actor
- Craig Ferguson, actor and comedian
- George Ferguson, stage and silent film actor
- Jane Fonda, actress, writer, producer
- Jimmy Finlayson, born in Larbert, Stirlingshire; actor
- Scott Foley, actor
- China Forbes, lead singer of Pink Martini
- Glenn Ford, actor
- Edwin Forrest, Shakespearean actor
- Laura Fraser, born in Glasgow; actress
- Drew Fuller, actor and former model
- Judy Garland, actress and singer
- Lauren Graham, actress
- Gloria Grahame, actress
- Greer Garson, actress
- Ashlyn Gere, actress
- Paul Giamatti, actor
- Isabel Gillies, author and actor
- Karen Gillan, born in Inverness; actress
- Michelle Gomez, born in Glasgow; actress
- Brian Austin Green, actor
- Andy Griffith, comedian, actor and singer best known for The Andy Griffith Show
- Rebecca Hall, actress
- Oliver Hardy, comedic actor, best known for Laurel and Hardy
- Roy Ellsworth Harris, classical composer
- Colton Haynes, actor
- Katharine Hepburn, actor
- Charlton Heston, actor
- Paris Hilton, actress, model
- Edward Everett Horton, actor
- Ron Howard, actor and director
- Steve Howey, actor
- Felicity Huffman, actress
- Anjelica Huston, actor
- Ashley Jensen, born in Annan, Dumfriesshire; actress
- Caitlyn Jenner, media personality and former athlete
- Kendall Jenner, model and businesswoman
- Kris Jenner, media personality and businesswoman
- Kylie Jenner, media personality and businesswoman
- Spike Jonze, director, producer, screenwriter and actor, small amount of Scottish ancestry
- Khloé Kardashian, media personality and businesswoman
- Kim Kardashian, media personality and businesswoman
- Kourtney Kardashian, media personality and businesswoman
- Rob Kardashian, media personality
- Cody Kasch, television actor (Desperate Housewives)
- Max Kasch, television and film actor
- Michael Keaton, actor
- Riley Keough, actress
- David Keith, actor
- Anna Kendrick, actress
- Deborah Kerr, actress
- Nicole Kidman, actress
- Val Kilmer, actor
- Nancy Kwan, actress
- Sunny Lane, porn star
- Brie Larson, actress, filmmaker
- Eva LaRue, actress, model
- Jennifer Lawrence, actress
- Jay Leno, comedian, former actor, host of The Tonight Show
- Hamish Linklater, best known for his role in the series The New Adventures of Old Christine
- Ray Liotta, actor
- Marion Lorne, actress best known for her recurring role as Aunt Clara in the series Bewitched
- Chad Lowe, actor
- Myrna Loy, actor
- Chloé Lukasiak, actress and dancer
- Kate McKinnon, actress, comedian
- Karen McDougal, model, actress
- Jeanette MacDonald, actress and singer
- Andie MacDowell, actor
- Seth MacFarlane, writer of Family Guy
- Ali MacGraw, actor
- Alexander Mackendrick, director and professor
- Kyle MacLachlan, actor (Twin Peaks)
- Patrick Macnee, actor
- Michael Madsen, actor
- Virginia Madsen, actress
- John Malkovich, actor
- Ross McCorkell, drag queen known as Rosé
- Gates McFadden, actress
- Danica McKellar, actress
- Benjamin McKenzie, actor and author
- Kevin McKidd, actor and director
- Zoe McLellan, actor
- Wendi McLendon-Covey, actress
- Steve McQueen, actor
- Steven R. McQueen, actor
- Caroline McWilliams, actor
- Donald Meek, actor
- Marian Mercer, actress
- Andy Milligan, playwright, screenwriter, actor, and filmmaker
- Cameron Mitchell, actor
- John Cameron Mitchell, actor, playwright, screenwriter, singer, songwriter, producer and director
- Demi Moore, actress
- Julianne Moore, actress
- Agnes Moorehead, actress
- Marilyn Monroe, actress
- Elizabeth Montgomery, actress
- Robert Montgomery, film and television actor, director and producer
- Jennifer Morrison, actress, director, producer, and former child model
- Jim Morrison, singer/songwriter of The Doors
- Sean Murray, actor
- Timothy Olyphant, actor
- Mary-Louise Parker, actress
- Aaron Paul, actor and producer
- Sara Paxton, actress and singer
- Nia Peeples, actress and singer
- Lou Diamond Phillips, actor
- Ryan Potter, actor
- Freddie Prinze Jr., actor
- Margaret Qualley, actress
- Rachael Ray, television personality, chef
- Burt Reynolds, actor
- Jason Ritter, actor
- AnnaSophia Robb, actress, model, and singer
- Amber Rose, model, actress
- Emma Roberts, actor
- Julia Roberts, actor
- Sarah Roemer, actor
- Ginger Rogers, actress; born Virginia Katherine McMath
- Mickey Rooney, actor
- Brandon Routh, actor
- Christina Ricci, actress
- Jane Russell, actor
- George C. Scott, actor
- Seann William Scott, actor, Steve Stifler of American Pie,
- Brooke Shields, actor
- Kiernan Shipka, actress
- Alicia Silverstone, actress
- Barbara Stanwyck, actor
- Jimmy Stewart, actor, Brigadier General (USAFR)
- John Stewart, musician
- Emma Stone, actress
- David Strathairn, actor, The River Wild
- Donald Sutherland, actor
- Kiefer Sutherland, actor
- Michael Tait, musician
- Elizabeth Tulloch, actress
- Kate Upton, actress, model
- Casper Van Dien, actor
- Milo Ventimiglia, actor
- Jurgen Vsych, film director, screenwriter and author
- Christopher Walken, actor
- Kerry Washington, actress
- John Wayne, actor
- Sigourney Weaver, actress
- Kristen Wiig, actress
- Olivia Wilde, actress
- Michelle Williams, actress
- Patrick Wilson, actor
- Katherine Waterston, actress
- Tuesday Weld, actress
- Reese Witherspoon, actress
- Steven Wright, comedian, actor and writer
- Alan Young, actor
- Joe Yule, comedian, burlesque and motion pictures
- Cyma Zarghami, current president of Nickelodeon and MTV's Kids and Family Group
- Zendaya, actress, singer

== Government and military ==
George W. Bush, 43rd President of the U.S.

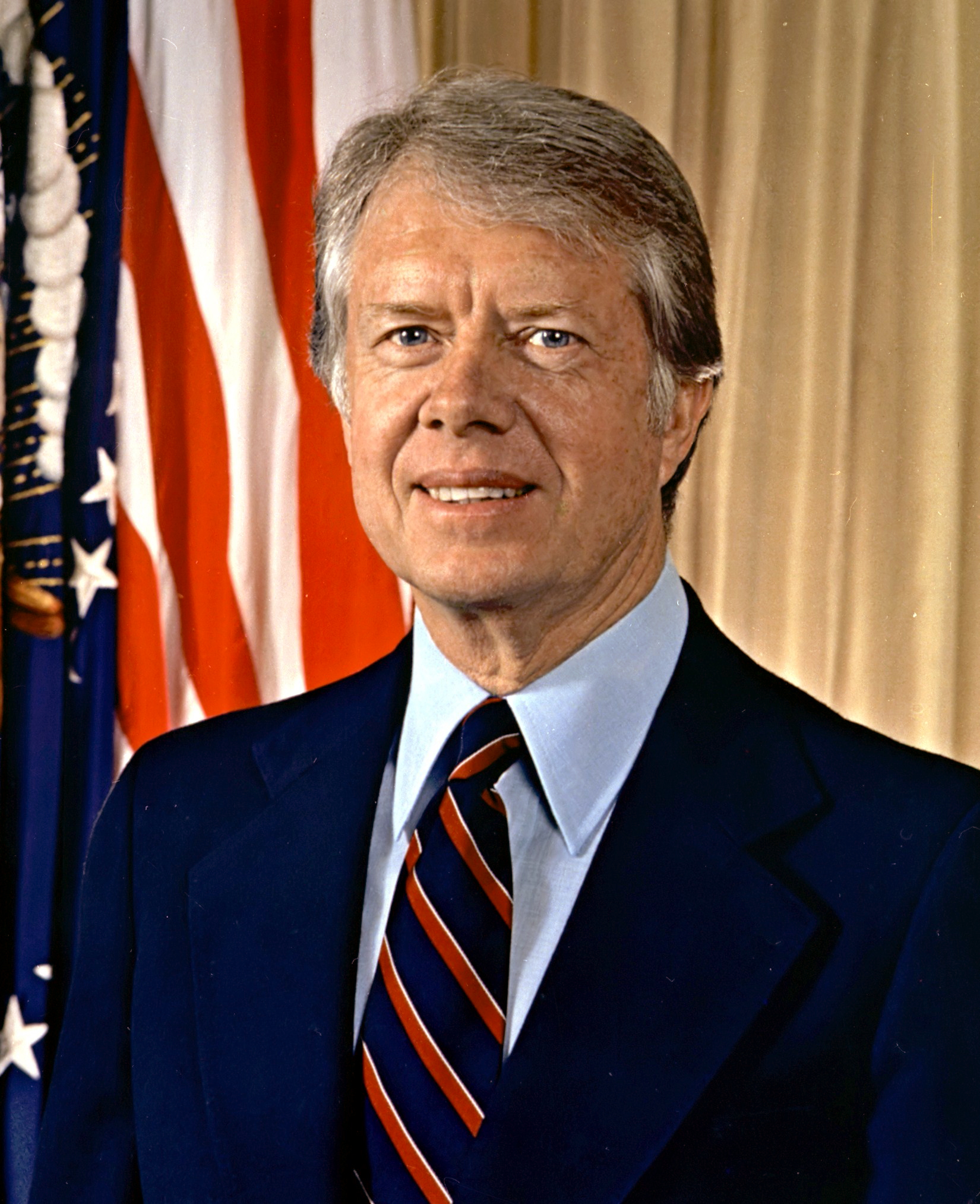
Jimmy Carter, 39th President of the U.S.

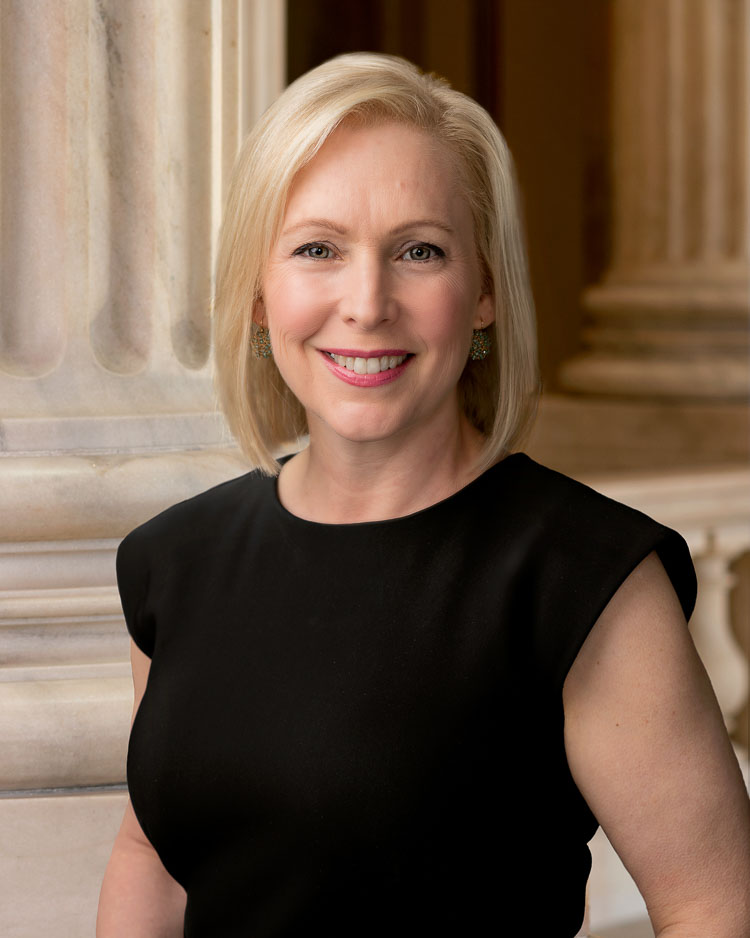
Kirsten Gillibrand, U.S. Senator from New York

Barack Obama, 44th President of the U.S.

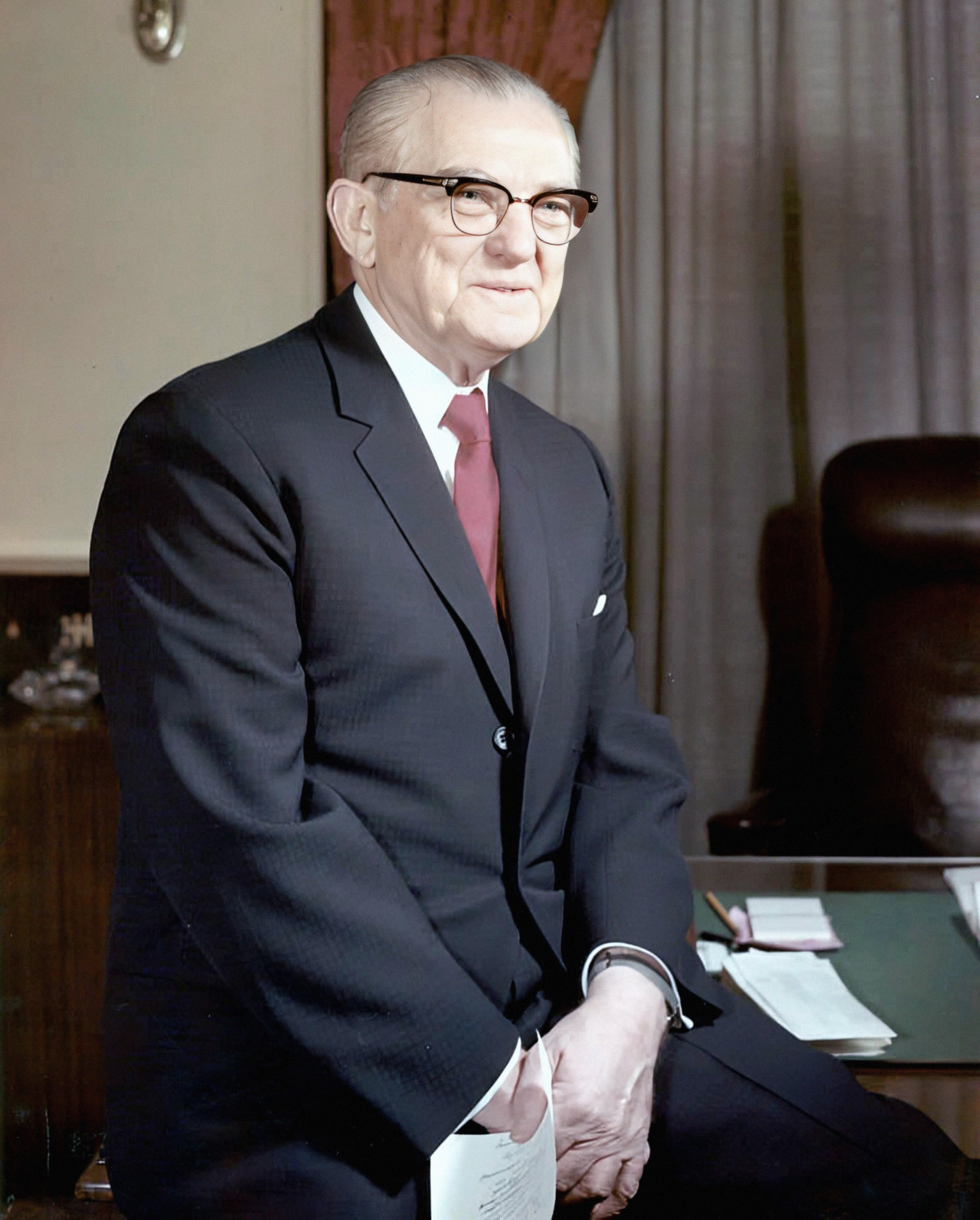
John C. Stennis, U.S. Senator from Mississippi

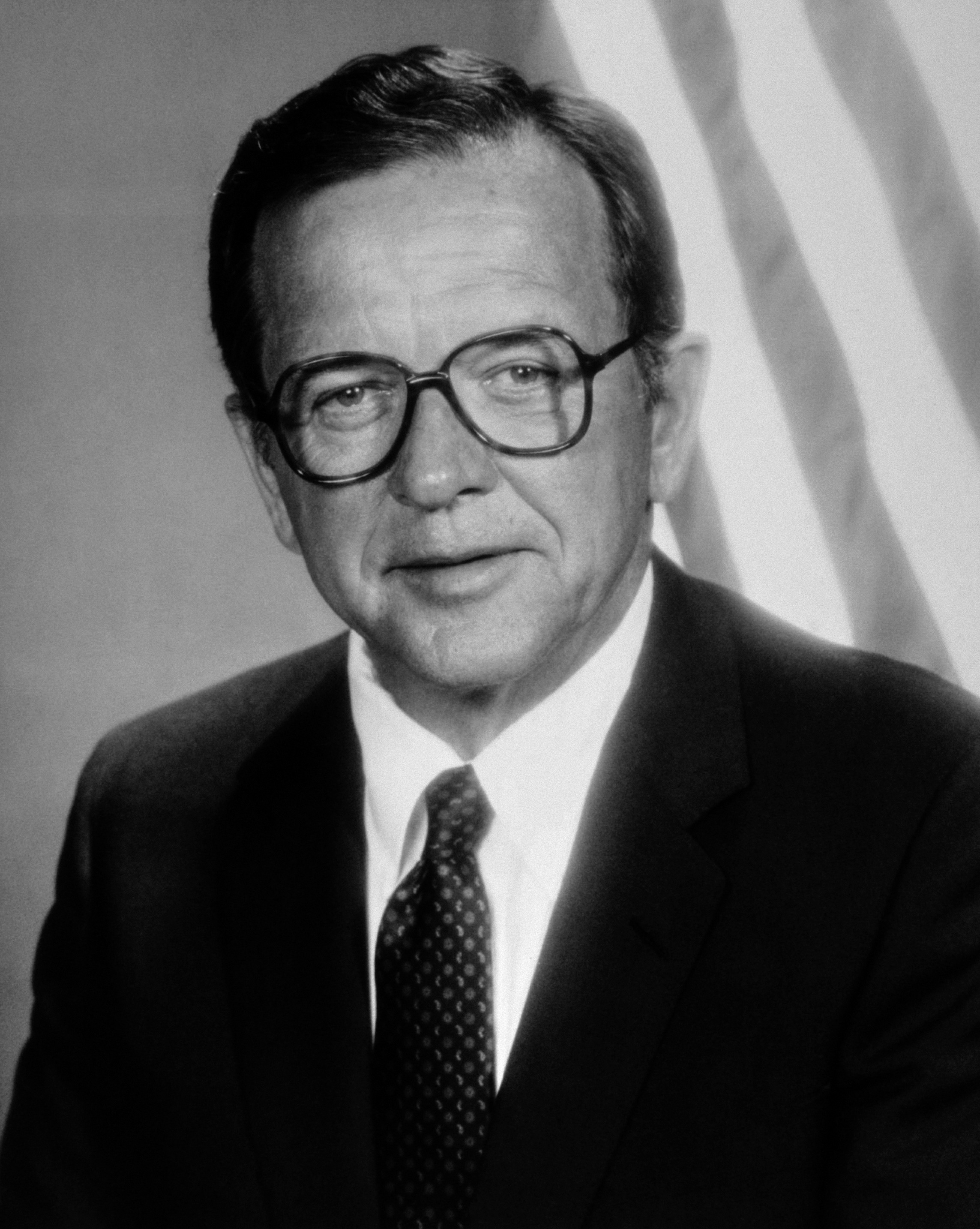
Ted Stevens, U.S. Senator from Alaska

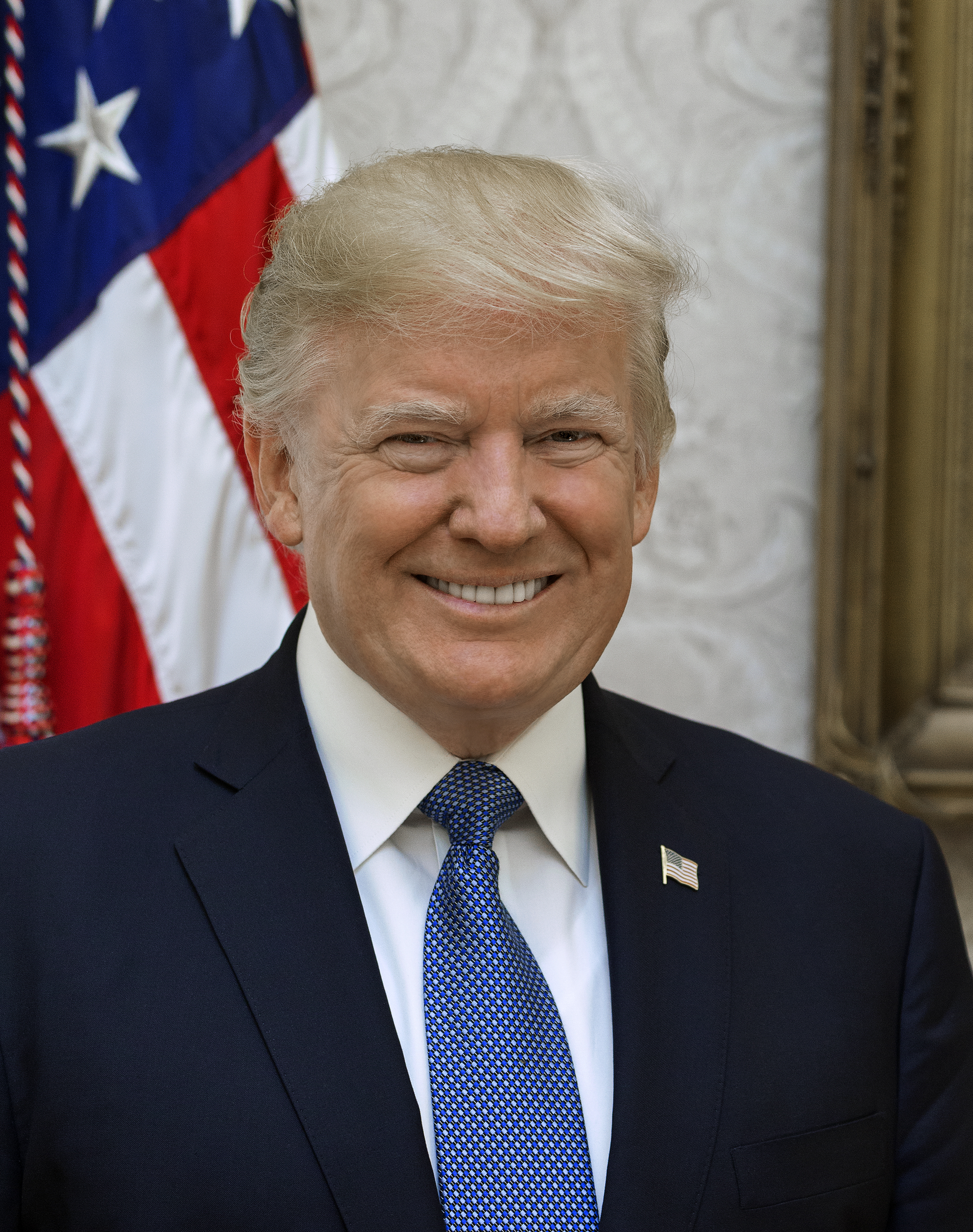
Donald Trump, 45th President of the United States

- Creighton Abrams, U.S. Army general, commanded military operations in Vietnam from 1968 to 1972
- John Adair, eighth governor of Kentucky
- Edwin "Buzz" Aldrin, U.S. Air Force pilot and astronaut, second man to walk on the Moon in 1969 on Apollo 11. First mission into space was Gemini 12 in 1966.
- William Alexander, major-general during the American Revolutionary War
- John Anderson, colonial governor of New Jersey in 1736
- Matthew Arbuckle, general, closely identified with the Indian Territory (Oklahoma) for the last thirty years of his life; commanded Fort Smith near Indian Territory; established Forts Gibson and Towson in Indian Territory
- Neil Armstrong, Naval aviator and astronaut, first man to walk on the Moon in 1969 on Apollo 11. First mission into space was Gemini 8 in 1966.
- Chester A. Arthur, American president
- John S. Barbour Jr., politician from Virginia
- Maryanne Trump Barry, judge
- Alan Bean, astronaut and fourth person to walk on the Moon in 1969 on Apollo 12
- James B. Beck, politician from Kentucky
- Austin Blair, politician from Michigan
- Sherrod Brown, senator from Ohio
- Jim Bowie, frontiersman and a defender of the Alamo
- Omar N. Bradley, general
- John Breathitt, 11th governor of Kentucky
- Robert G. Bremner, U.S. congressman from New Jersey
- John W. Brown, New York Supreme Court Justice and U.S. congressman from New York
- George A. Bruce, politician from New Hampshire and Massachusetts
- Albert Bryant Jr., U.S. Army brigadier general
- Bay Buchanan, Treasurer of the United States (1981–1983)
- Hugh Buchanan, U.S. congressman from Georgia
- Pat Buchanan, author, political commentator, and politician
- Irvine Bulloch, officer in the Confederate Navy
- Ambrose Burnside, U.S. Army officer and politician
- Joseph R. Burton, politician from Kansas
- George H. W. Bush, 41st president of the United States
- George W. Bush, 43rd president of the United States
- Jeb Bush, former Republican governor of Florida
- John C. Caldwell, teacher, a Union general in the American Civil War, and an American diplomat
- Archibald Campbell, politician from New York
- Bill Campbell, politician from California
- George W. Campbell, politician, Tennessee Supreme Court Justice, U.S. Ambassador to Russia and the 5th United States Secretary of the Treasury
- John Campbell, politician from California
- John G. Campbell, U.S. delegate from the Arizona Territory
- Thomas Mitchell Campbell, 12th governor of Texas
- William Joseph Campbell, district judge in Illinois
- Isabella Cannon, 32nd Mayor of Raleigh, North Carolina
- Wooda Nicholas Carr, politician from Pennsylvania
- Kit Carson, frontiersman and Union Army officer
- Richard Caswell, 1st and 5th governor of North Carolina
- William B. Charles, U.S. congressman from New York and New York state assemblyman
- Chris Christie, former governor of New Jersey
- William Claflin, governor of Massachusetts
- George Rogers Clark, surveyor and military officer during the American Revolutionary War
- Grover Cleveland, 22nd and 24th president of the United States
- Hillary Clinton, former U.S. Senator and First Lady of the United States, mother is of Scottish ancestry
- Jack Coghill, 6th lieutenant governor of Alaska
- Merian C. Cooper, pilot and officer in Army Air Service, filmmaker, actor, and producer
- Hector Craig, U.S. congressman from New York
- Samuel W. Crawford, U.S. Army surgeon and Union general in the American Civil War
- William Crawford, U.S. congressman from Pennsylvania
- Davy Crockett, frontiersman, U.S. congressman and a defender of the Alamo
- Robert Crosser, U.S. congressman from Ohio, Ohio state representative
- Marcus Henderson Cruikshank, Confederate States of America politician
- Alexander J. Dallas, U. S. Navy officer
- George M. Dallas, vice president of the United States, US senator from Pennsylvania, mayor of Philadelphia, Secretary of the Treasury, US Minister to Court of St. James and Russia
- Howard Dean, governor of Vermont
- John Edwards, lawyer and politician from North Carolina
- James E. Ferguson, 26th governor of Texas
- Millard Fillmore, 13th president of the United States
- William Fleming, physician, soldier, politician, and planter; briefly governor of Virginia during the American Revolutionary War
- James Florio, governor of New Jersey
- John B. Frazier, U. S. Navy officer
- John Kenneth Galbraith, economist
- Alexander Garden, American Revolutionary War soldier
- James Lorraine Geddes, brigade commander in the Western Theater of the American Civil War
- James Gilfillan, 13th Treasurer of the United States
- Henry Bell Gilkeson, lawyer, politician, school administrator, and banker in West Virginia
- Kirsten Gillibrand, U.S. senator from New York
- George W. Gillie, U.S. congressman from Indiana
- Newt Gingrich, former U.S. congressman and Speaker of the House.
- John Glenn, former U.S. senator from Ohio, Marine Corps aviator and astronaut; first American to orbit the Earth, Mercury/Friendship 7
- John B. Gordon, Confederate general
- Arthur F. Gorham, World War II paratrooper and hero during the invasion of Sicily
- Archibald Gracie III, U.S. Army officer and Confederate brigadier general
- Ulysses S. Grant, 18th President of the United States, Union Army General, 1864 promoted to Lieutenant General and Commander of all the Union armies in American Civil War.
- Charles McNeill Gray, mayor of Chicago
- Robert Gray, sea captain and explorer
- John Greig, U.S. congressman from New York
- William Halsey Jr., Fleet Admiral during World War II in the Pacific theater
- Alexander Hamilton, first Secretary of the Treasury
- John Hancock, president of the Second Continental Congress and was the first and third governor of the Commonwealth of Massachusetts and first signatory of the United States Declaration of Independence, known for his large signature
- Steny Hoyer, Democratic House Majority leader in the 116th Congress, and a U.S. representative from Maryland's 5th congressional district
- Warren G. Harding, 29th president of the United States
- Rutherford B. Hayes, 19th president of the United States and major general during the Civil War
- George Hairston, politician
- Robert Hairston, politician, military officer
- John Hardy, U.S. congressman from New York, New York state assemblyman
- John Hay, statesman and diplomat, private secretary to Abraham Lincoln, served under William McKinley and Theodore Roosevelt
- Patrick Henry, Revolutionary War officer, colonel of the 1st Virginia Infantry, known for the "give me liberty, or give me death!" speech
- Harold G. Hoffman, governor of New Jersey
- William Hooper, Founding Father, lawyer, and politician from North Carolina
- Sam Houston, 1st and 3rd president of Texas and later 7th governor of Texas, 6th governor of Tennessee 1827–1829, US congressman from Tennessee and US senator from Texas. Major general in the Texas Revolution. Defeated Santa Anna at Battle of San Jacinto. Opposed secession and remained loyal to the Union during the Civil War.
- John Houstoun, lawyer and politician from Georgia
- Rufus Ingalls, 16th Quartermaster General of the United States Army
- James Iredell Jr., governor of North Carolina
- Thomas Jefferson, 3rd president of the United States
- Samuel Johnston, 6th governor of North Carolina and U.S. Senator from North Carolina
- John Paul Jones, Scottish-born, American Revolutionary War naval officer, American admiral, and rear admiral in the Imperial Russian Navy
- Tim Kaine, US senator from Virginia
- John L. Kennedy, U.S. congressman from Nebraska
- John Kerry, former US senator from Massachusetts, 2004 Democratic presidential nominee, US Secretary of State in Obama administration
- Daniel S. Lamont, United States Secretary of War during Grover Cleveland's second term
- Henry Latimer, physician and politician from Delaware
- Roberta Lawson, head of the Women's Division of the Oklahoma Council of Defense during World War I
- Hugh Swinton Legaré, lawyer and politician of Huguenot and Scottish ancestry
- Robert B. Lindsay, former governor of Alabama
- Edward Livingston, jurist, politician from Louisiana and New York; minister to France from 1833 to 1835; 46th mayor of New York City
- Matthew B. Lowrie, mayor of Pittsburgh, Pennsylvania
- Walter Lowrie, 3rd Secretary of the Senate, U.S. Senator from Pennsylvania
- Dan Lungren, lawyer and politician from California
- Nathaniel Lyon, American general, first Union general killed in the Civil War in 1861 at the Battle of Wilson's Creek
- Arthur MacArthur Sr., Associate Justice of the United States Supreme Court, Judge of the Wisconsin Circuit Court, former governor of Wisconsin, former lieutenant governor of Wisconsin,
- Arthur MacArthur Jr., Union officer during the Civil War, American general, father of General Douglas MacArthur
- Douglas MacArthur, five-star American Army General in the Pacific theater during World War II and commander of American forces in Korean War
- John Lewis MacDonald, politician from Minnesota
- Clark MacGregor, politician from Minnesota
- Archibald T. MacIntyre, politician
- George MacKinnon, politician from Minnesota
- Franklin MacVeagh, U.S. Secretary of the Treasury (1909–1913)
- Duncan McArthur, military officer and politician from Ohio
- Archibald McBryde, U.S. congressman from North Carolina
- Tom McClintock, politician from California
- Henry Dickerson McDaniel, governor of Georgia
- James McDivitt, USAF brigadier general, former astronaut, test pilot and aeronautical engineer who flew in the Gemini 4 and Apollo 9 missions
- Irvin McDowell, general, commanded Union forces at the First Battle of Bull Run (First Manassas)
- Samuel McDowell, soldier in three wars and political leader in Virginia and Kentucky
- George B. McClellan, Union major general during the American Civil War; Democratic presidential nominee in 1864; later governor of New Jersey; organized the Army of the Potomac; served briefly (November 1861 to March 1862) as the general-in-chief of the Union Army
- Robert Mueller, lawyer and government official
- Scott McClellan, former White House press secretary
- John J. McCloy, lawyer, diplomat, banker, and presidential advisor
- Lachlan McIntosh, military and political leader during the American Revolution and the early United States
- Mike McIntyre, politician from North Carolina
- Kenneth McKellar, politician from Tennessee
- Alexander McKenzie, U.S. Navy Medal of Honor recipient
- William McKinley, 25th president of the United States, 3rd US president to be assassinated
- James McLachlan, U.S. congressman from California
- John McLane, 50th governor of New Hampshire
- Mack McLarty, White House Chief of Staff (1993–1994)
- James C. McLaughlin, politician from Michigan
- Robert McNamara, U.S. Defense Secretary and president of the World Bank
- Dan K. McNeill, American general
- David Brydie Mitchell, governor of Georgia
- Hugh Moffat, 36th Mayor of Detroit
- Walter Mondale, U.S. senator from Minnesota, 1984 Democratic presidential nominee
- James Monroe, 4th president of the United States
- George Stephen Morrison, United States Navy rear admiral (upper half) and naval aviator, father of Jim Morrison, the lead singer of the rock band The Doors
- Thomas Z. Morrow, colonel of the 32nd Kentucky Infantry during the American Civil War
- William Moultrie, general in American Revolutionary War
- Patty Murray, U.S. senator from Washington
- Hugh Nelson, politician from Virginia
- Francis G. Newlands, politician from Nevada
- Gavin Newsom, 40th governor of California
- Samuel D. Nicholson, politician from Colorado
- Barack Obama, 44th president of the United States, first Black president of the United States, elected in 2008
- Robert Dale Owen, U.S. Minister to the Kingdom of the Two Sicilies, U.S. congressman from Indiana, Indiana state representative
- David Paterson, politician from New York
- George S. Patton, American general, commanded troops in North Africa and in Europe during World War 2
- Thomas Baldwin Peddie, politician from New Jersey
- James K. Polk, 11th president of the United States
- Colin Powell, former U.S. general and Chairman of the Joint Chiefs of Staff, US Secretary of State
- Marilyn Quayle, lawyer, wife of former vice president of the United States Dan Quayle; former second Lady of the United States
- William Wilson Quinn, director of the Strategic Service Unit, American general
- Samuel Ralston, governor of Indiana and U.S. senator
- Ronald Reagan, 40th president of United States, governor of California
- Jim Risch, politician from Idaho
- Mitt Romney, governor of Massachusetts and 2012 Republican presidential nominee
- Theodore Roosevelt, 26th president of the United States, former vice president of the United States, governor of New York
- Robert Rutherford, U.S. congressman from Virginia, Virginia state senator
- Winfield Scott, general, veteran of War of 1812, commanded American Army of Occupation during the Mexican–American War
- Alan Shepard, naval aviator and astronaut; first American in space and fifth man to walk on the Moon, Apollo 14
- William E. Smith, 14th governor of Wisconsin, 5th state treasurer of Wisconsin, 21st speaker of the Wisconsin Assembly, Wisconsin state senator
- George Spalding, politician from Michigan
- John C. Stennis, U.S. senator from Mississippi
- Ted Stevens, U.S. senator from Alaska, U.S. Attorney and Solicitor of Interior
- Jeb Stuart, Confederate cavalry general; commanded the cavalry corps in Lee's Army of Northern Virginia; killed at Battle of Yellow Tavern
- George Sutherland, Associate Justice of the United States Supreme Court, U.S. senator from Utah, U.S. representative from Utah
- William Howard Taft, 27th president of the United States, Chief Justice of the United States, United States Secretary of War, 1st Provisional Governor of Cuba, Governor-General of the Philippines, Judge of the United States Court of Appeals for the Sixth Circuit, United States Solicitor General
- Edward Telfair, governor of Georgia
- David P. Thompson, governor of the Idaho Territory
- Jeffrey Trail, Navy LTJG and Gulf War veteran
- George Troup, governor of Georgia
- Donald Trump, 45th and 47th President of the United States
- JD Vance, Former U.S. senator from Ohio, 50th US Vice President
- James Webb, U. S. senator, author of Born Fighting: How the Scots-Irish Shaped America (2004)
- Alexander White, politician from Virginia
- Heather Wilson, 24th Secretary of the U.S. Air Force
- James Wilson, Associate Justice of the Supreme Court of the United States, signatory of the Declaration of Independence
- James Wilson, 4th U.S. Secretary of Agriculture, former representative from Iowa and Speaker of the Iowa House of Representatives
- Malcolm Wilson, 50th governor of New York
- William B. Wilson, 1st U.S. Secretary of Labor, former representative from Pennsylvania
- Woodrow Wilson, 28th president of the United States
- Henry A. Wise, Confederate brigadier general and governor of Virginia
- John Witherspoon, Scots Presbyterian minister and signatory of the United States Declaration of Independence
- John Yule, 16th Speaker of the California State Assembly, California state senator

== Inventors, engineers, and academics ==
- Thomas Addis, physician and scientist
- Sextus Barbour, physician and planter
- Earl W. Bascom, inventor of rodeo equipment
- Alexander Graham Bell, inventor of the telephone
- Alexander Melville Bell, teacher and researcher of physiological phonetics
- James Blair, founder of the College of William and Mary
- Walter Houser Brattain, inventor of the transistor
- George Harold Brown, research engineer
- James McGill Buchanan, economist
- Nicholas Murray Butler, philosopher, diplomat, and educator
- Joseph Campbell, professor of comparative mythology
- William Wallace Campbell, astronomer
- Allan McLeod Cormack, physicist
- Donald J. Cram, shared the 1987 Nobel Prize in chemistry with Jean-Marie Lehn and Charles J. Pedersen
- J. Presper Eckert, computer pioneer, co-designed the ENIAC
- Alexander Garden, botanist; namesake of gardenia flower; physician and zoologist
- William Harkness, astronomer
- Irving Langmuir, chemist, physicist, and engineer
- David MacAdam, physicist and color scientist
- James Ross MacDonald, physicist
- Kevin B. MacDonald, psychology professor at California State University
- Catharine MacKinnon, feminist legal scholar, activist, and author
- Colin Munro MacLeod, geneticist
- Katherine McAlpine, science journalist
- Richard Sears McCulloh, civil engineer
- Andrew Cunningham McLaughlin, historian
- Norman Ramsey Jr., Nobel Prize-winning physicist
- Robert Burns Woodward, Nobel Prize-winning chemist

== Musicians and singers ==
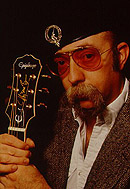
Jeff Baxter

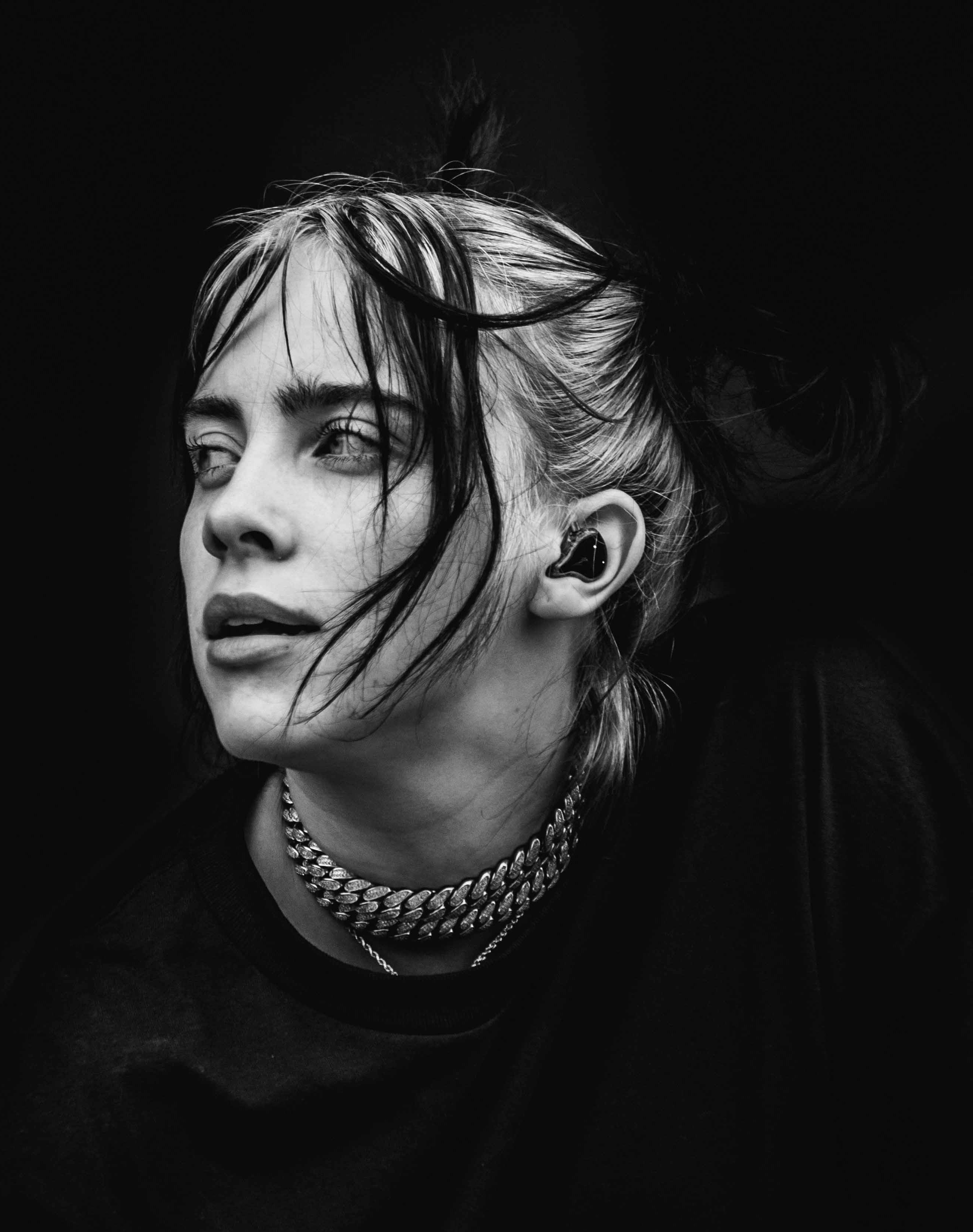
Billie Eilish

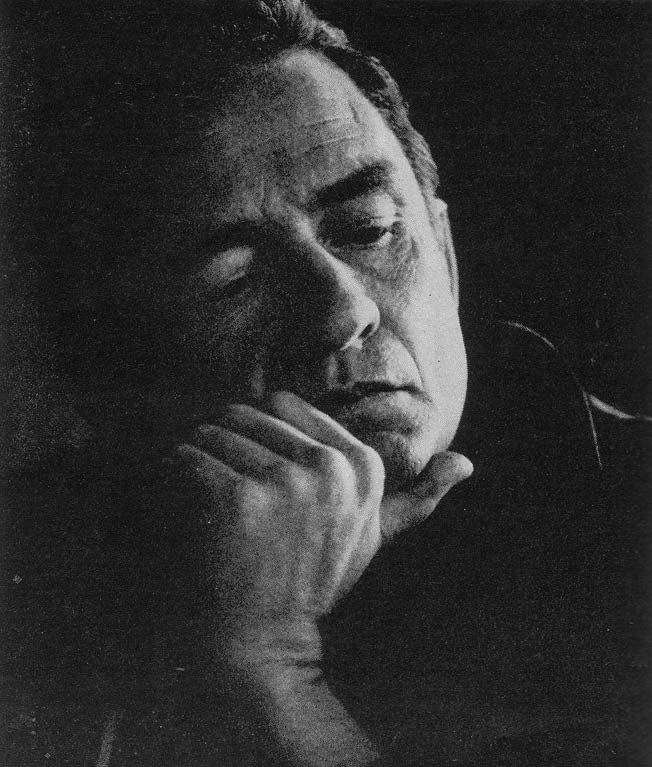
Johnny Cash

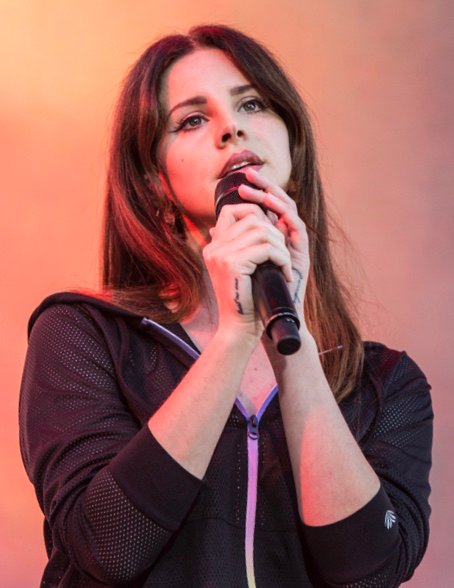
Lana Del Rey

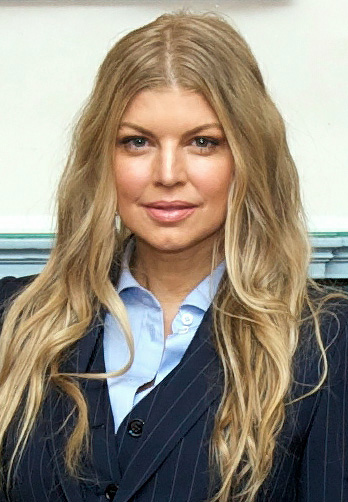
Fergie

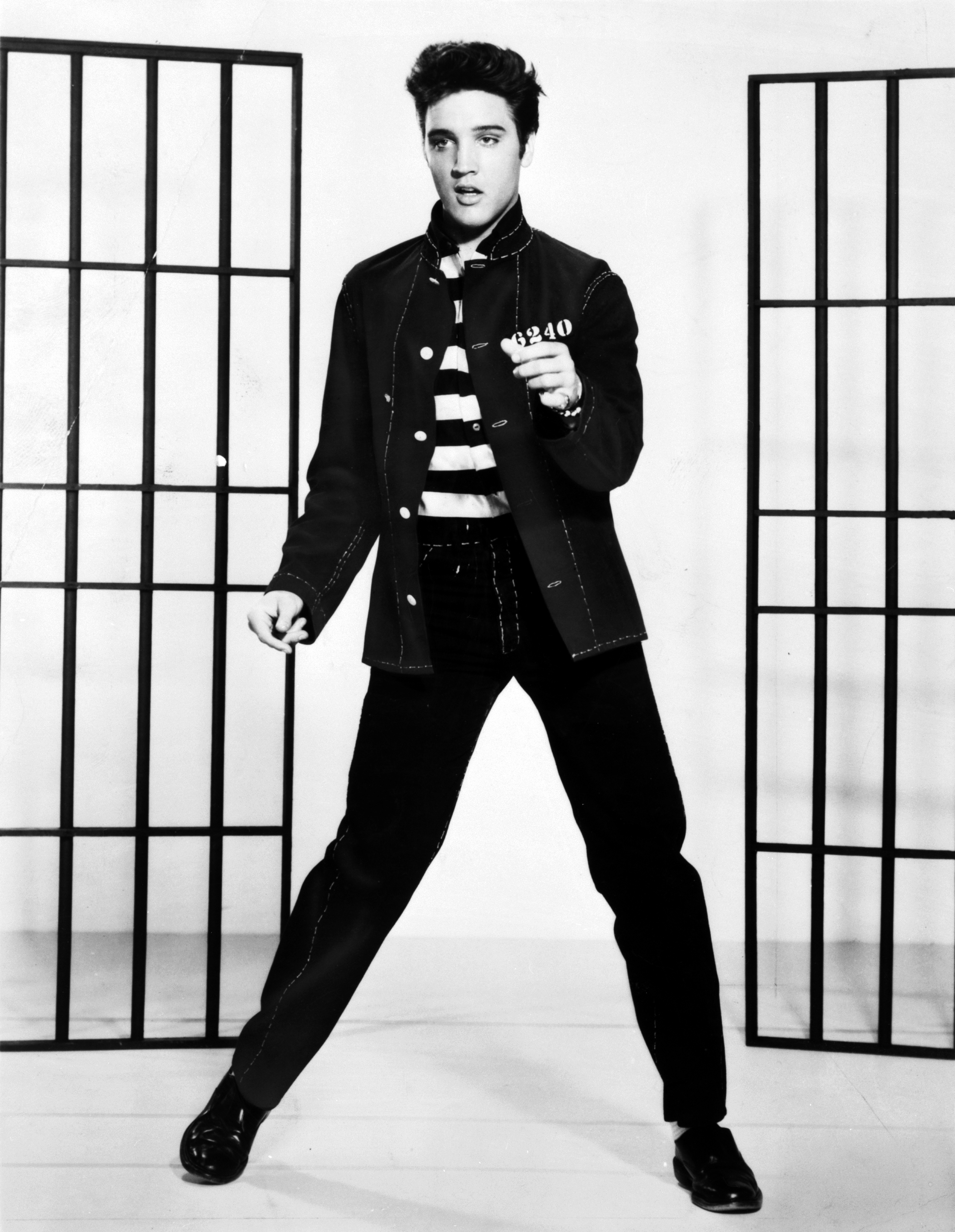
Elvis Presley

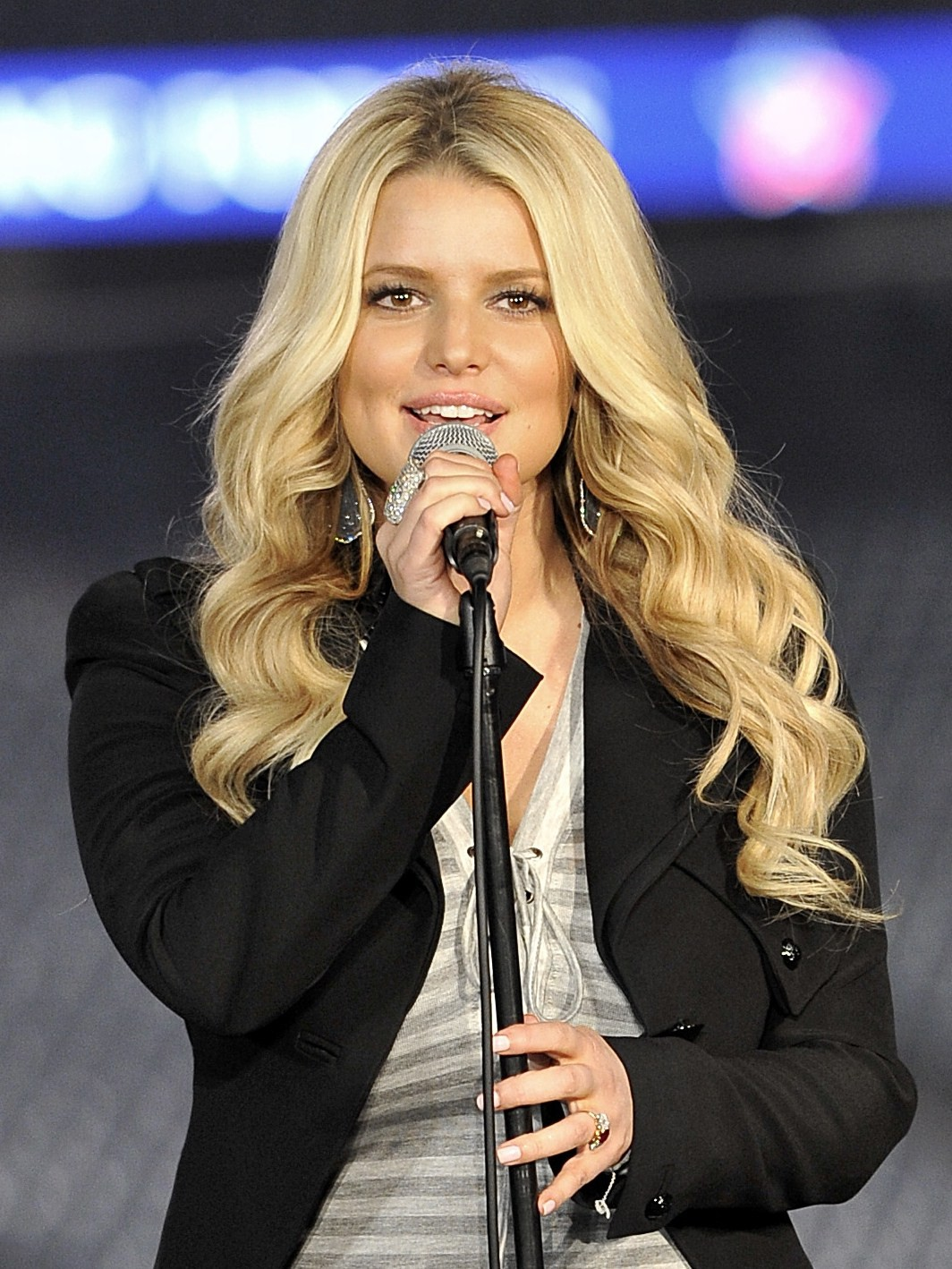
Jessica Simpson

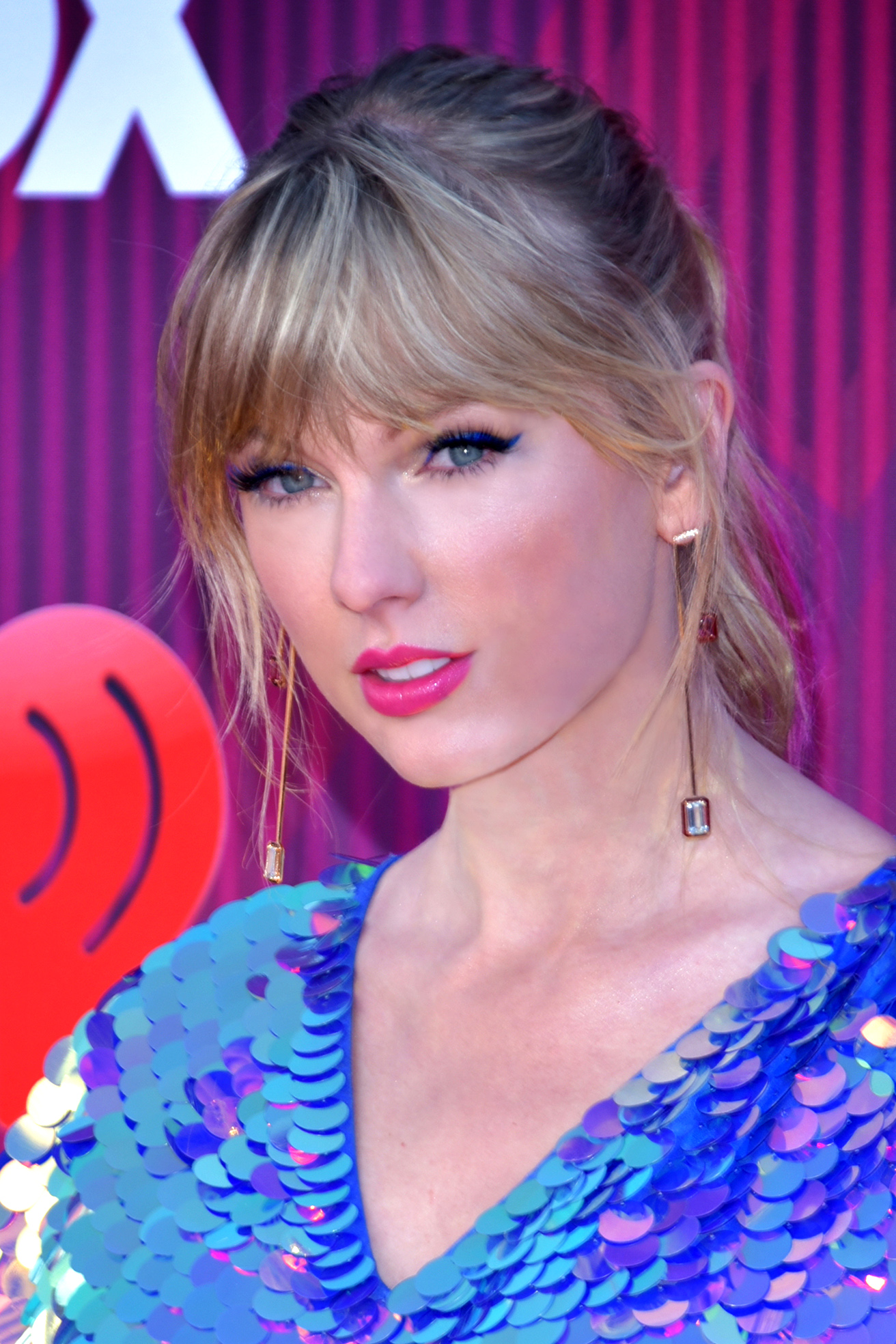
Taylor Swift

- Billie Joe Armstrong, singer and guitarist for Green Day
- Billie Eilish, singer-songwriter
- Tim Armstrong, lead singer and guitarist for Rancid
- Emilie Autumn, singer-songwriter, poet, author, and violinist
- Joan Baez, singer-songwriter and activist
- Jeff Baxter, guitarist for Steely Dan
- Shannon Bex, former member of Danity Kane
- Wes Borland, of the band Limp Bizkit
- Roy Buchanan, guitarist and blues musician; a pioneer of the Telecaster sound
- David Byrne, musician, singer-songwriter of the band Talking Heads
- David Campbell, composer
- Glen Campbell, singer
- Aaron Carter, singer
- Nick Carter, singer
- Johnny Cash, singer
- Rosanne Cash, singer-songwriter; daughter of Johnny Cash
- Kurt Cobain, lead singer, guitarist, and primary songwriter of the rock band Nirvana
- Alice Cooper, rock singer
- Miley Cyrus, pop and country singer, songwriter, actress, daughter of Billy Ray Cyrus and Tish Cyrus, sister of Noah Cyrus
- Brann Dailor, drummer for Mastodon
- Glen Danzig, singer known for work with Misfits and Danzig
- Jonathan Davis, lead singer and songwriter for Korn
- Stacy "Fergie" Ferguson, singer best known as part of The Black Eyed Peas
- Lana Del Rey, singer-songwriter
- Brandon Flowers, singer and keyboardist of The Killers
- Dan Fogelberg, singer-songwriter and multi-instrumentalist
- Alison Fraser, singer and actress
- G-Eazy, (born 1989), rapper
- Lady Gaga, singer, songwriter, and actress
- Kim Gordon, singer/guitarist for Sonic Youth
- Kina Grannis, guitarist, singer, and YouTuber
- Debbie Harry, lead singer of Blondie
- Oscar Hammerstein II, writer of musicals of "Rodgers and Hammerstein" fame, Scottish grandparent
- Gil-Scott Heron, jazz poet, singer, musician, and author
- James Hetfield, singer/rhythm guitarist of Metallica
- Faith Hill, singer
- John S. Hilliard, composer
- Brent Hinds, singer/guitarist for Mastodon
- David Homyk, singer-songwriter, record producer, actor, model, and television personality
- Alan Hovhaness, composer
- Alicia Keys, singer
- Chris Kirkpatrick, former member of N'Sync
- Amy Lee, lead singer of Evanescence
- Joanna Levesque, better known by her stage name JoJo, singer
- Tony MacAlpine, guitarist
- Adam MacDougall, keyboardist
- Ian MacKaye, early hardcore and emo personality, noted for Minor Threat and Fugazi
- Talitha MacKenzie, singer
- Marshall "Eminem" Mathers, rapper
- Mandy Moore, singer
- Tim McAllister, classical saxophonist and music educator
- Jesse McCartney, singer
- Country Joe McDonald, lead singer of the 1960s psychedelic rock group Country Joe and the Fish
- Tim McGraw, country music singer
- Ray McKinley, jazz drummer, singer, and bandleader
- Jon McLaughlin, singer-songwriter
- Don McLean, singer-songwriter
- Katharine McPhee, pop and R&B musician
- Johnny Mercer, lyricist, songwriter, singer, and co-founder of Capitol Records
- Brian Molko, lead singer of Placebo
- Jim Morrison, singer, poet
- Michael Nesmith, musician, actor, The Monkees
- Mike Ness, guitarist and songwriter in the band Social Distortion
- Wayne Newton, singer
- Phil Ochs, singer-songwriter
- Brad Paisley, country music singer
- Tom Petty, guitarist and vocalist in the band Tom Petty and the Heartbreakers
- Elvis Presley, singer
- Bonnie Raitt, singer-songwriter
- John Raitt, Broadway musical star
- Doug Robb, musician and lead singer of rock band Hoobastank
- Axl Rose, lead singer from Guns and Roses
- Ryan Ross, musician, previously with Panic! at the Disco and now with The Young Veins
- Hillary Scott, singer-songwriter
- Jessica Simpson, singer
- Layne Staley, original lead singer of Alice in Chains
- Gwen Stefani, singer
- Izzy Stradlin, rock musician
- Taylor Swift, country/pop singer
- Carrie Underwood, singer-songwriter, and actress
- Brendon Urie, lead singer of Panic! at the Disco
- Gene Vincent, rockabilly singer
- Kate Voegele, singer
- Tom Waits, singer-songwriter
- Sheila Walsh, Christian singer
- Gerard Way, lead singer of My Chemical Romance
- Mikey Way, bass guitarist for My Chemical Romance
- Florence Welch, lead singer of Florence and the Machine
- Jack White aka John Anthony Gillis, of The White Stripes

== Native American leaders ==
- Alexander McGillivray, Creek (Muscogee) chief
- William McIntosh, Creek (Muscogee) military leader
- Peter McQueen, Creek (Muscogee) military leader
- Menawa, Creek (Muscogee) military leader
- John Norton, Mohawk chief
- John Ross, Cherokee chief
- William Weatherford, Creek (Muscogee) military leader

== Religion ==
- William Sloane Coffin, clergyman
- George Grant, evangelical writer and a Presbyterian Church in America (PCA) pastor
- John Menzies Macfarlane, hymn writer
- Mike MacIntosh, senior pastor of Horizon Christian Fellowship
- David O. McKay, ninth president of The Church of Jesus Christ of Latter-day Saints (LDS Church), Scottish father
- Scotty McLennan, Unitarian Universalist minister, lawyer, professor
- Pat Robertson, founder and host of the 700 Club
- Joseph Smith, founder of the Latter Day Saint movement, through his mother Lucy Mack Smith

== Sports ==
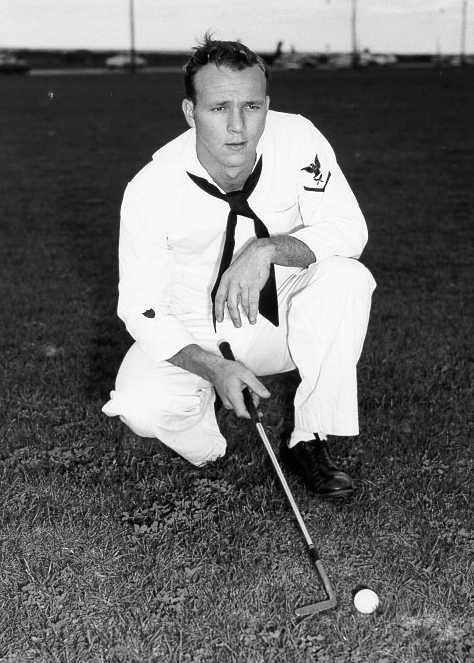
Arnold Palmer

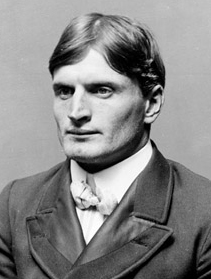
Rube Waddell

- Robert Archibald, first Scottish NBA player
- Tommy Armour III, professional golfer
- Earl W. Bascom, rodeo pioneer, hall of fame inductee, "Father of Modern Rodeo"
- Don Budge, tennis player
- Gordon Burness, soccer player
- Roy Carlyle, baseball player
- Mickey Cochrane, baseball Hall of Famer
- Jason Castro, MLB player for Minnesota Twins
- Meryl Davis, ice skater
- Walter Dick, soccer player
- Julian Edelman, professional football player
- Brandon Forsyth, ice skater
- Patrick Galbraith, tennis player
- Tony Gonzalez, former professional football player
- Jimmy Gallagher, soccer player who was inducted into the National Soccer Hall of Fame
- Malcolm Goldie, soccer player who won one cap for the US national team
- Drew Galloway, professional wrestler
- Hulk Hogan, professional wrestler
- John Harkes, soccer coach
- Dan Henderson, wrestler
- Josh Hamilton, Texas Rangers outfielder
- Jack Hobens, golfer
- Euan Holden, American soccer player currently playing for Danish team Vejle BK
- Stuart Holden, US international soccer player, currently playing for Houston Dynamo
- April Hunter, professional wrestler
- Jock Hutchison, professional golfer
- Chris Jericho, professional wrestler
- Dominic Kinnear, US international soccer player and current head coach of Houston Dynamo, born in Glasgow
- Bob MacDonald, former Major League Baseball player
- Danny MacFayden, baseball player
- Arthur Matsu, football player
- Seth McClung, baseball player
- Charlie McCully, soccer player who won 11 caps for the US national team
- Brandon McDonald, soccer player
- Shaun McDonald, American football player
- Tommy McFarlane, soccer player
- Parker McLachlin, professional golfer
- Jason McLaughlin, soccer player
- Fred McLeod, professional golfer
- Nate McLouth, baseball player currently playing for the Atlanta Braves
- Doug McMillan, soccer player
- Jamie McMurray, racing driver
- Tommy Morrison, boxer
- James Naismith, Canadian-born innovator, invented the game of basketball, member of the Naismith Memorial Basketball Hall of Fame & FIBA Hall of Fame
- Joe Ogilvie, professional golfer
- Arnold Palmer, golfer
- Michael Phelps, Olympic swimmer
- Roddy Piper, wrestler
- Frank Ramsey, basketball player and coach
- Aaron Rodgers, American football player
- Jock Sutherland, American football player and coach
- Bobby Thomson, baseball player
- Lawrence Tynes, NFL player
- J. J. Watt, NFL player for Houston Texans
- Rube Waddell, Hall of Fame pitcher

== Writers ==
- Helen Adam, poet, collagist and photographer
- Louis Auchincloss, lawyer, novelist, historian, and essayist
- Paul Dayton Bailey, writer and owner/publisher of Westernlore Press
- Lesley Bannatyne, historian who writes extensively on Halloween
- Hugh Henry Brackenridge, writer, lawyer, judge, and justice of the Supreme Court of Pennsylvania
- Quinn Bradlee, memoirist and filmmaker
- Carol Brink, juvenile and adult novelist, winner of 1936 Newbery Medal
- Fredric Brown, short story writer
- Erskine Caldwell, novelist and short story writer
- Taylor Caldwell, historical novelist
- John Dickson Carr, mystery novelist
- Michael Crichton, author, screenwriter and filmmaker
- Laurie York Erskine, popular boys adventure author and educator
- William Faulkner, novelist and short story writer, winner of Nobel Prize in Literature
- Alex Finlayson, playwright
- B. C. Forbes, journalist and author who founded Forbes magazine
- Esther Forbes, novelist and children's writer
- Robert Frost, poet
- Cork Graham, author; imprisoned in Vietnam for trespassing while looking for treasure buried by Captain Kidd
- Alex Haley, author of Roots
- Alice Henderson, novelist
- Robert E. Howard, author of the Conan fantasy series
- Langston Hughes, poet, social activist, novelist, playwright, and columnist
- Washington Irving, short-story writer, essayist, biographer, historian, and diplomat of the early 19th century
- Garrison Keillor, author, storyteller, humorist, and radio personality; host of the Minnesota Public Radio show A Prairie Home Companion
- Steven Keillor, historian and author
- Will Leitch, writer and the founding editor of the Gawker Media former sports blog Deadspin
- Amy MacDonald, author of children's books
- Sally MacKenzie, romance novelist
- Norman Maclean, author of A River Runs Through It
- Archibald MacLeish, modernist poet, Pulitzer Prize winner and Librarian of Congress
- Sean McAdam, sports writer
- Helen McCloy, mystery writer
- David McCullough, popular historian
- Dennis McDougal, author and newspaper journalist
- Al McIntosh, editor of the Rock County Star-Herald of Luverne, Minnesota and president of the Minnesota Newspaper Association
- Larry McMurtry, novelist, essayist, and screenwriter
- Judith McNaught, romance novelist
- Herman Melville, novelist, short story writer, and poet; author of Moby Dick
- Edgar Allan Poe, short story writer, poet and critic
- Sally Quinn, journalist and author
- J. D. Salinger, writer of The Catcher in the Rye
- Phyllis Schlafly, politically conservative, anti-abortion activist and writer
- Upton Sinclair, Pulitzer Prize–winning author
- Henry David Thoreau, naturalist, essayist, poet, and philosopher
- Mark Twain, writer, humorist, essayist, entrepreneur, publisher and lecturer
- Thomas Wolfe, novelist and short story writer

== Other ==
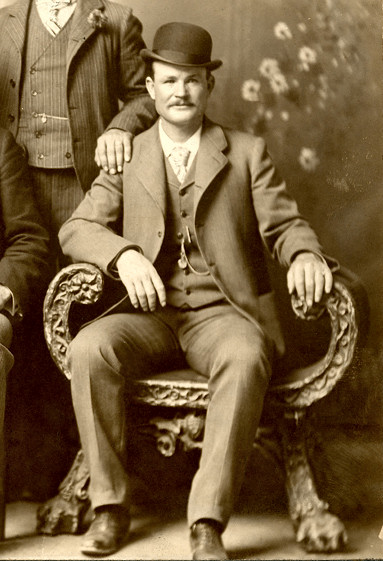
Butch Cassidy

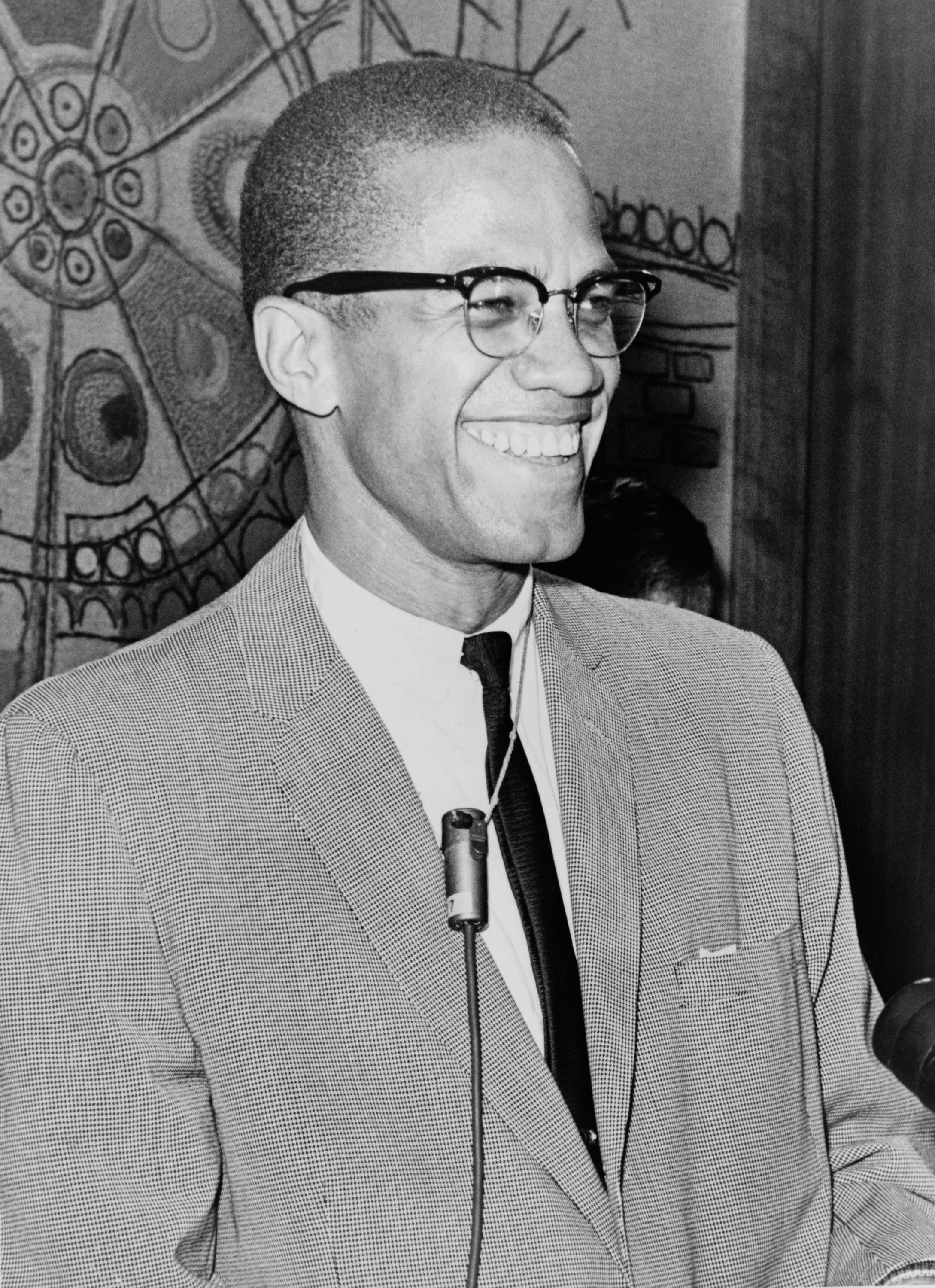
Malcolm X

- Tom Bendelow, golf course architect
- Alfred Blalock, surgeon
- Catherine Wolfe Bruce, philanthropist and patron of astronomy
- Pat Buchanan, paleoconservative political commentator, nativist, author, syndicated columnist, politician, and broadcaster; former conservative host of CNN Crossfire
- Erin Burnett, CNN news anchor
- Mary Katherine Campbell (1905–1990), Miss America titleholder 1922 and 1923, first runner-up in 1924
- Butch Cassidy, train and bank robber
- Virgil Earp, U.S. marshal
- Wyatt Earp, lawman and gambler
- Mary Baker Eddy, founder of the Christian Science movement
- William Henry Farquhar, contributed to the development of modern Montgomery County, Maryland
- Jenna Bush Hager, journalist, news personality, author
- Ilan Hall, chef
- Arlo Hemphill, wilderness advocate
- Doc Holliday, gambler
- Kennedy, political commentator for Fox News
- Barbour Lathrop, philanthropist and world traveler
- Malcolm X, militant and religious leader
- Flora MacDonald (emigrated to America after failure of Jacobite rising of 1745)
- Ranald MacDonald, first person to teach the English language in Japan
- Jane McCrea, 18th century woman killed by Native Americans
- George Henry Mackenzie, chess master
- Lisa McPherson, Scientologist whose death was a source of much controversy for the Church of Scientology
- Lee Miller, photographer and photojournalist
- David Muir, television journalist
- John Muir, naturalist
- Charlie Rose, television journalist, talk show host
- Trump Family
  - Barron, youngest child of Donald Trump
  - Don Jr, businessman, philanthropist
  - Eric, businessman, philanthropist
  - Ivanka, businesswoman, author, fashion designer
  - Mary Anne MacLeod Trump, philanthropist and mother of 45th & 47th Donald Trump
  - Tiffany, socialite, model & Daughter Of 45th & 47th US President Donald Trump

== See also ==
- List of Scots
- Scottish Canadians
