= Amy MacDonald =

Amy MacDonald may refer to:

== People ==
- Amy MacDonald (writer) (born 1951), American author
- Amy McDonald (Scottish footballer) (born 1985), Scottish footballer
- Amy Macdonald (born 1987), Scottish singer-songwriter
- Amy McDonald (Australian footballer) (born 1998), Australian footballer

== Fictional ==
- Amy Barlow, character on the British soap opera Coronation Street, also called Amy McDonald

== See also ==
- Aimi MacDonald (born 1942), Scottish-born comedian and actress
