= Dr. Henry Frost Office =

Building in South Carolina, United States

Coordinates: 32.776529°N 79.932154°W

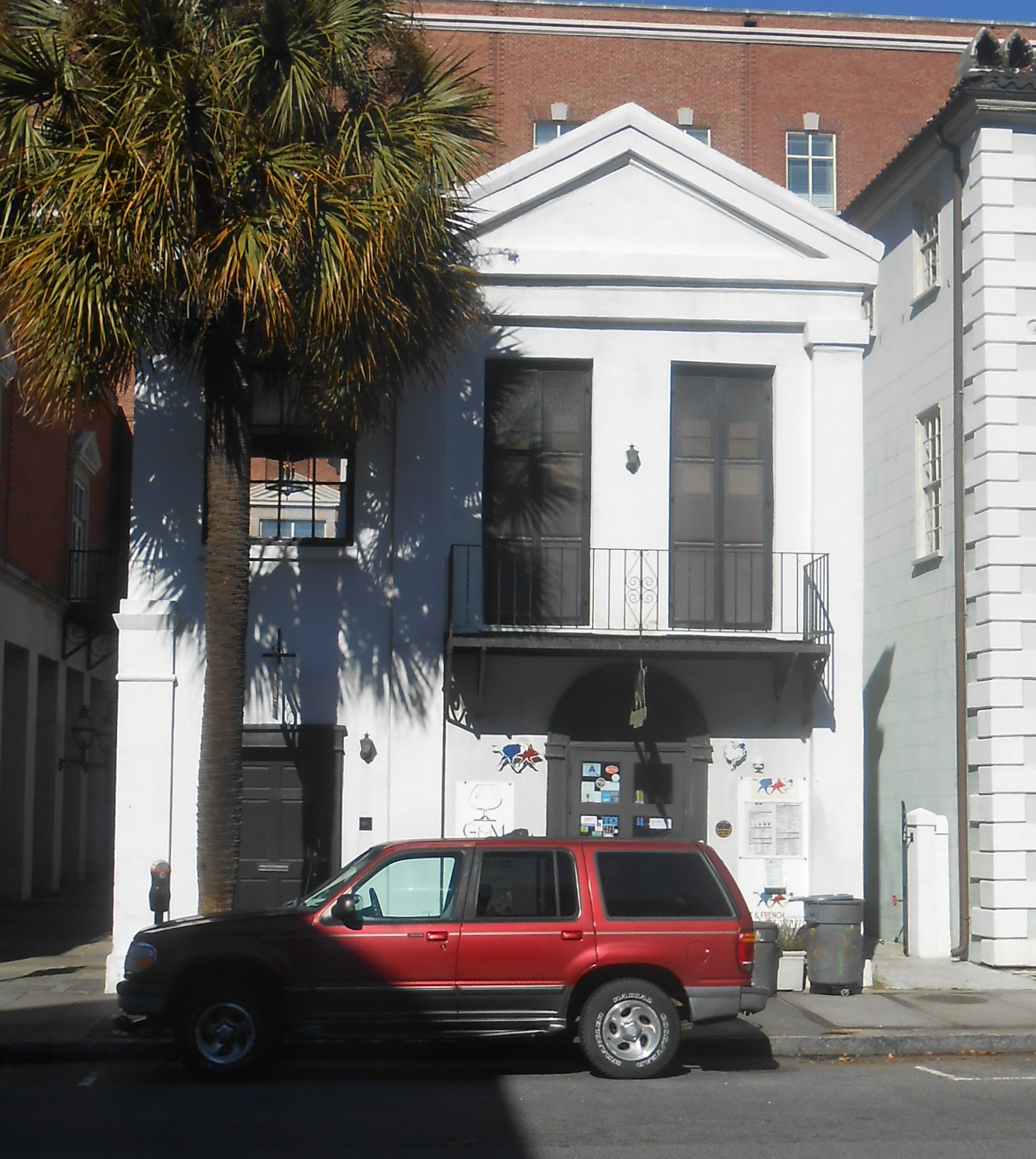
The Office of Dr. Henry Frost is at 98 Broad Street, Charleston, South Carolina.

The Dr. Henry Frost Office at 98 Broad Street is composed of a front portion that appears to date from the mid-19th century and a rear portion that appears to be much older. The land upon which 98 Broad Street was built was owned by famous loyalist and horticulturalist Alexander Garden when he was forced to abandon the property when Charleston fell to the colonial forces in 1782.

The rear portion of the current building includes a massive chimney and was perhaps a small kitchen house behind Dr. Garden's house. In the mid-1990s, the rear portion of the building (sometimes referred to as 98 1/2 Broad Street) was in danger of being demolished to make way for an annex to the Charleston County Courthouse.

The bulk of the current building was apparently built by Dr. Henry Frost in about 1835 and used as an office. In the 20th century, the building was owned by Dr. William Horlbeck Frampton, a doctor working for Standard Oil. When Belvidere Plantation was being demolished by Standard Oil, Dr. Frampton salvaged some of its early 19th century woodwork and installed it in the front portion of 98 Broad Street.
