= Alexander Garden (priest) =

Alexander Garden (c. 1685 – 1756) was a Scottish Episcopalian priest, educated at the University of Aberdeen. In 1719 he went to South Carolina, then part of the American Colonies, as the Bishop of London's Commissary, and became rector of St. Philip's Church in Charleston. He was a prominent figure in the early history of Charleston, known then as Charles Town. Garden is often remembered for his efforts to censor the evangelist George Whitefield and prevent his "enthusiastic" type of religious meetings from being held in Charles Town, SC.

As well as supervising other clergymen in the area he took an interest in the Charleston Free School, and established the so-called "Negro School" which was supported by the Church of England's Society for the Propagation of the Gospel. In the spring of 1754 he retired and went to live in England, but soon went back to the warmer climate of South Carolina and died there in 1756.

== See also ==
- Alexander Garden (naturalist)

== Sources ==
- William Howland Kenney, III. ″Alexander Garden and George Whitefield: The Significance of Revivalism in South Carolina 1738-1741″. The South Carolina Historical Magazine, Vol. 71, No. 1 (January 1970), pp. 1–16.
- William Buell Sprague. Annals of the American Episcopal pulpit. London:, n.p.?, 1859.
