= Sally MacKenzie =

American novelist

- Writing career
- Genre: novels

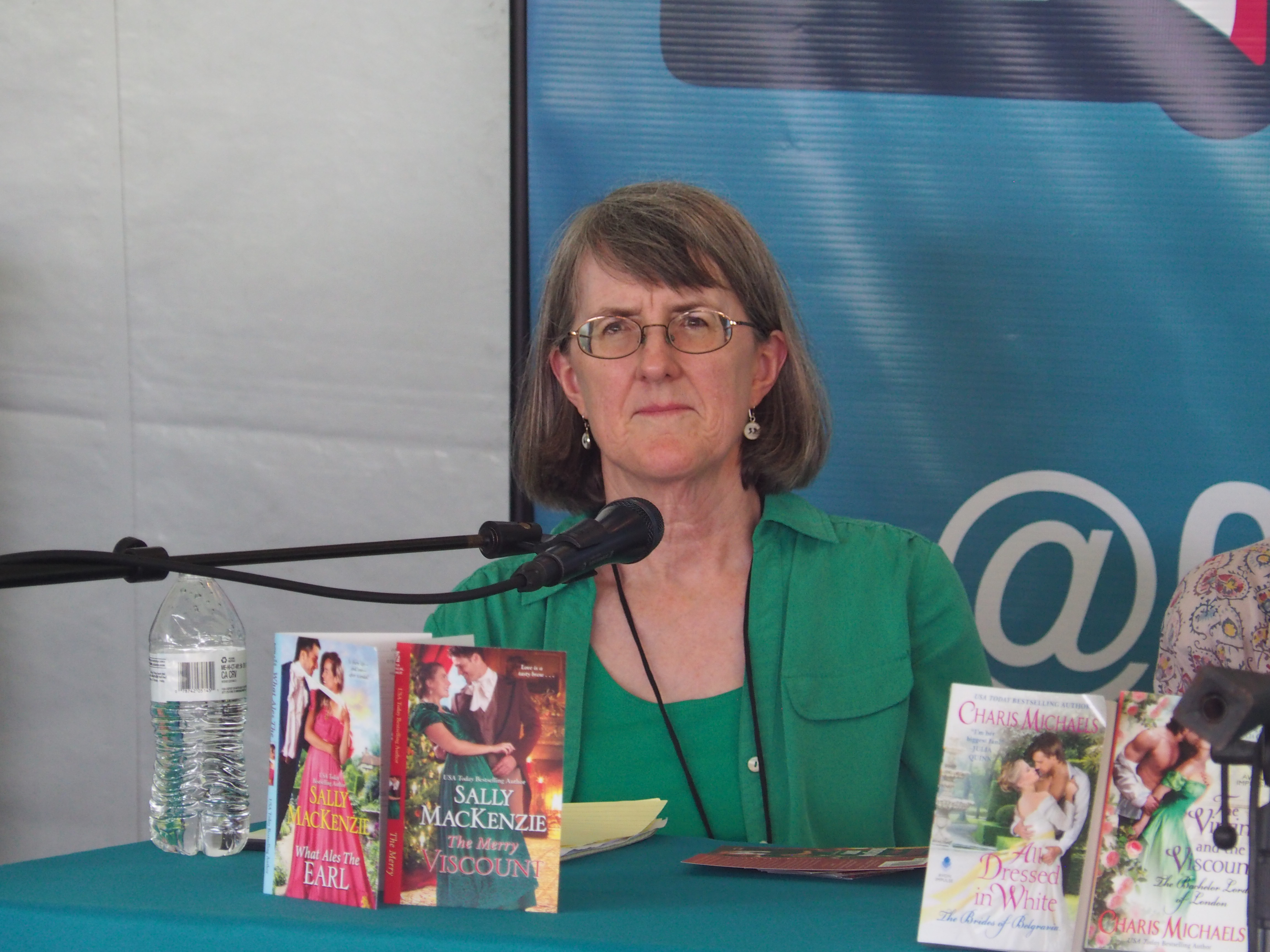
Sally MacKenzie 5183049

Sally MacKenzie is a USA Today bestselling romance novelist who has currently published eight books, The Naked Duke (2005), The Naked Marquis (2006), The Naked Earl (2007), The Naked Gentleman (2008), The Naked Baron (2009), The Naked Viscount (2010), The Naked King (2011), and Bedding Lord Ned (2012).

According to Romance Reviews Today, The Naked Marquis is “… charming … funny … full of delightful characters… The Naked Marquis merits a place on the keeper shelves of readers of the traditional Regency and the spicier Regency-set historical romances alike".

MacKenzie lives in Maryland and is a mother of four.

== Works ==
- The Naked Duke (2005)
- The Naked Marquis (2006)
- The Naked Earl (2007)
- The Naked Gentleman (2008)
- The Naked Baron (2009)
- The Naked Viscount (2010)
- The Naked King (2011)
- The duchess of love, Tantor Media, Inc., 2012. ISBN 9781452638478, OCLC 793823347
- Bedding Lord Ned, Tantor Media, 2012. ISBN 9781452608488, OCLC 793823285
- Surprising Lord Jack, Zebra Books/Kensington Pub., Co., 2013. ISBN 9781420123227, OCLC 1060738065
- Loving Lord Ash, Tantor Audio, 2014. ISBN 9781494560799, OCLC 926088779
- When to engage an earl, New York, NY : Zebra Books, 2017. ISBN 9781420137163, OCLC 958096954
