= Alexander Garden (naturalist) =

Scottish physician and scientist

Alexander Garden FRSE FRS (January 1730 – 15 April 1791) was a Scottish physician, botanist and zoologist. The gardenia flower is named after him. He lived for many years in Charleston, South Carolina, using his spare time to study plants and living creatures, and sending specimens to Carl Linnaeus.

== Biography ==
Garden was born in January 1730 in Birse, Aberdeenshire, the son of Rev Alexander Garden (1685–1756) the parish minister. He studied medicine at Marischal College in the mid-1740s, discovering an interest in natural history while there. After two years as a surgeon's assistant in the navy, he continued his medical studies at the University of Edinburgh. One of his teachers was Charles Alston, the King's Botanist and Keeper of the Garden at Holyrood where medicinal plants were cultivated; Alston was an influence on Garden's growing interest in botany.

An opportunity came to practise medicine in South Carolina, where a distant relative Reverend Alexander Garden had gone to minister to a congregation in Charleston. The younger Garden arrived there in April 1752, and started work in Prince William Parish. Marischal College granted his MD in 1754 and the following year he moved to Charleston (at that time called Charles Town) where he married Elizabeth Peronneau (1739–1805). Their children were Alexander, Margaret A., Harriotte, Juliette (who married Alexander Fotheringham), and William.

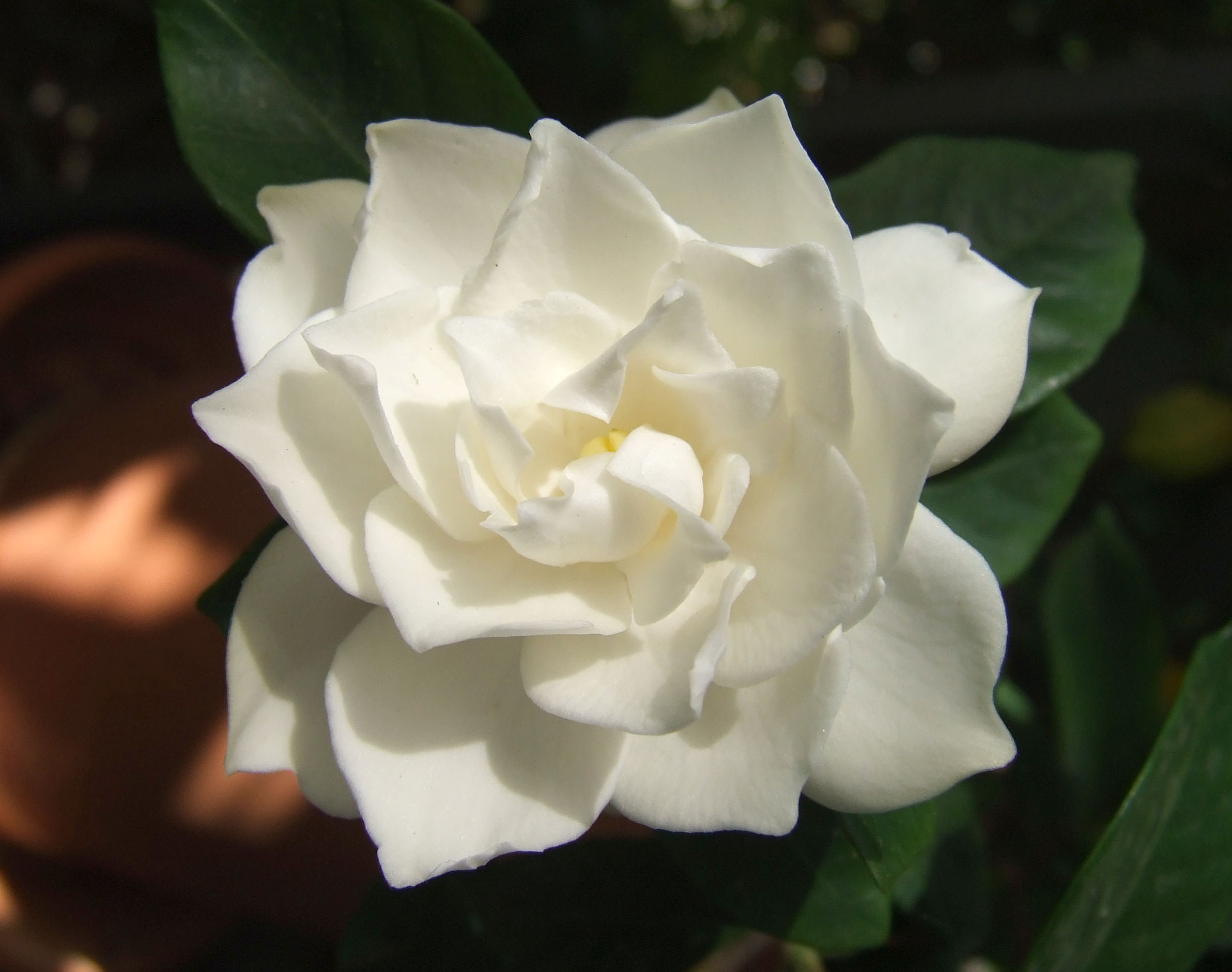
Gardenia flower named for Alexander Garden

Garden was partner in a busy practice but still found time for his greatest enthusiasm. He collected and studied flora and fauna and parcelled them up to send to John Ellis, a merchant and zoologist in London, and to Carl Linnaeus in Sweden, after discovering linnaean classification in 1754. There were no neighbours with similar interests – "there is not a living soul who knows the least iota of Natural History," he wrote to Ellis – and his botanical and zoological conversations were carried on by correspondence. His parcels to Europe included "birds, fish, reptiles, amphibia, insects, and plants" from South Carolina or further afield, some from new species or genera which were then described in the scientific literature. Garden was a member of several learned societies, and was elected to the revived American Philosophical Society (1768), as a Fellow of the Royal Society of London (1773) and a founder Fellow of the Royal Society of Edinburgh (1783).

He sent various magnolias and some Gordonia specimens to London, and wrote descriptions of Stillingia and Fothergilla, but ironically the plant named for him was nothing to do with his efforts, and not even American. Linnaeus had to be pushed to name a plant after Garden, and eventually Ellis persuaded him to use Gardenia as a name for the Cape jasmine, also known as Cape jessamine.

His zoological interests led Garden to write about cochineal insects and about the Greater Siren, (Sirena lacertina), once called the mud iguana. One of Garden's sirens is still in the London Natural History Museum, pickled in a jar. As a doctor, he used his scientific knowledge in the smallpox epidemic in Charleston in 1760 when he inoculated over 2000 people, and he published an essay on the medicinal properties of the pinkroot (Spigelia marilandica).

During the American War of Independence he sided with the British and sent congratulations to Cornwallis after the Battle of Camden. Two years later his property (including 98 Broad Street) was confiscated, he had to leave South Carolina, and in 1783 he went to live in Westminster in London. He became vice-president of the Royal Society and is said to have been respected for his "benevolence, cheerfulness, and pleasing manners".

His health had been poor for a long time and he died of tuberculosis at Cecil Street, London, on 15 April 1791, aged sixty-one.
