= Alexander Garden (soldier) =

American Revolutionary War soldier (1757–1829)

Alexander Garden (December 4, 1757 – February 26, 1829) was an American Revolutionary War soldier and writer from Charleston, South Carolina.

== Biography ==
Garden was born in Charleston, the son of the naturalist Dr. Alexander Garden and his wife, Elizabeth. He went to Westminster School in London and got his MA degree at the University of Glasgow in Scotland in 1779.

In 1780 Garden returned to America to join the Patriot cause. His father, a Loyalist who had been compelled to flee South Carolina and find refuge in London, never forgave his son. Garden joined the Continental Army and served as a cornet in Lee's Legion under "Light Horse Harry" Lee. In 1781 he was promoted to major and served for the remainder of the war as an aide-de-camp to General Nathanael Greene.

After the war, he was granted the right to his family's property, which like other Loyalist property in the South had been confiscated by the state government. He married Mary Anna Gibbes; the couple had no children, but they adopted her nephew, who took Garden's name and became his heir.

Garden was elected to the South Carolina General Assembly in 1784 and served one term. He was an officer of the South Carolina Society of the Cincinnati. He and other members of the Society tried to end the practice of duelling in South Carolina. He wrote several valuable, though admittedly didactic, works on the Revolution. He died probably at "Goose Creek", his family's estate near Charleston.

== Work published ==
- Anecdotes of the revolutionary war in America, with sketches of character of persons the most distinguished, in the Southern states, for civil and military services (Charleston 1822)
- Eulogy on Gen. Chs. Cotesworth Pinckney: president-general of the Society of the Cincinnati, delivered by appointment of the Society of the Cincinnati of South-Carolina, on Tuesday, the 1st of November, 1825, at St. Philip’s Church (Charleston 1825)
- Anecdotes of the American revolution, illustrative of the talents and virtues of the heroes and patriots, who acted the most conspicuous parts therein; second series (Charleston 1828)
