= Amy MacDonald (writer) =

American author of children's books (born 1951)

Amy MacDonald is an American author of children's books. Her works include Little Beaver and the Echo, which has been translated into 28 languages around the world, and Rachel Fister's Blister. Her first book, a satire of Jill Krementz's children's books, was A Very Young Housewife.

Amy MacDonald was born 1951 in Beverly, Massachusetts. She enjoyed reading books and writing satirical stories during her childhood. Amy MacDonald graduated from high school at Pingree School (1969), South Hamilton, Massachusetts and she graduated from college at the University of Pennsylvania (1973). She married Thomas Urquhart in 1976. Amy MacDonald went to France to study journalism 6 years after marrying her husband and moved to England and had children.

A freelance journalist, she has written for the New Yorker, the Times, and many publications, as well as co-producing a documentary film, "On This Island", shown on PBS's Independent Lens series. She teaches writing to schoolchildren around the world as well as working as a teaching artist for the Kennedy Center for Performing Arts in Washington, D. C. She now lives in Maine with her husband and three children.

== Bibliography ==
- 1979 A Very Young Housewife [as Del Tremens]
- 1990 Little Beaver and the Echo
- 1990 Rachel Fister's Blister
- 1991 Let's Do It, Let's Make a Noise, Let's Try
- 1991 Let's Play
- 1992 Let's Go
- 1992 Let's Pretend
- 1996 No More Nice
- 1996 Cousin Ruth's Tooth
- 1996 The Spider Who Created the World
- 2001 No More Nasty
- 2002 Quentin Fenton Herter III
- 2002 Please, Malese! A Trickster Tale from Haiti
- 2008 Too Much Flapdoodle
