= Boris Levit-Broun =

Soviet writer

Levit-Broun, Boris Leonidovich
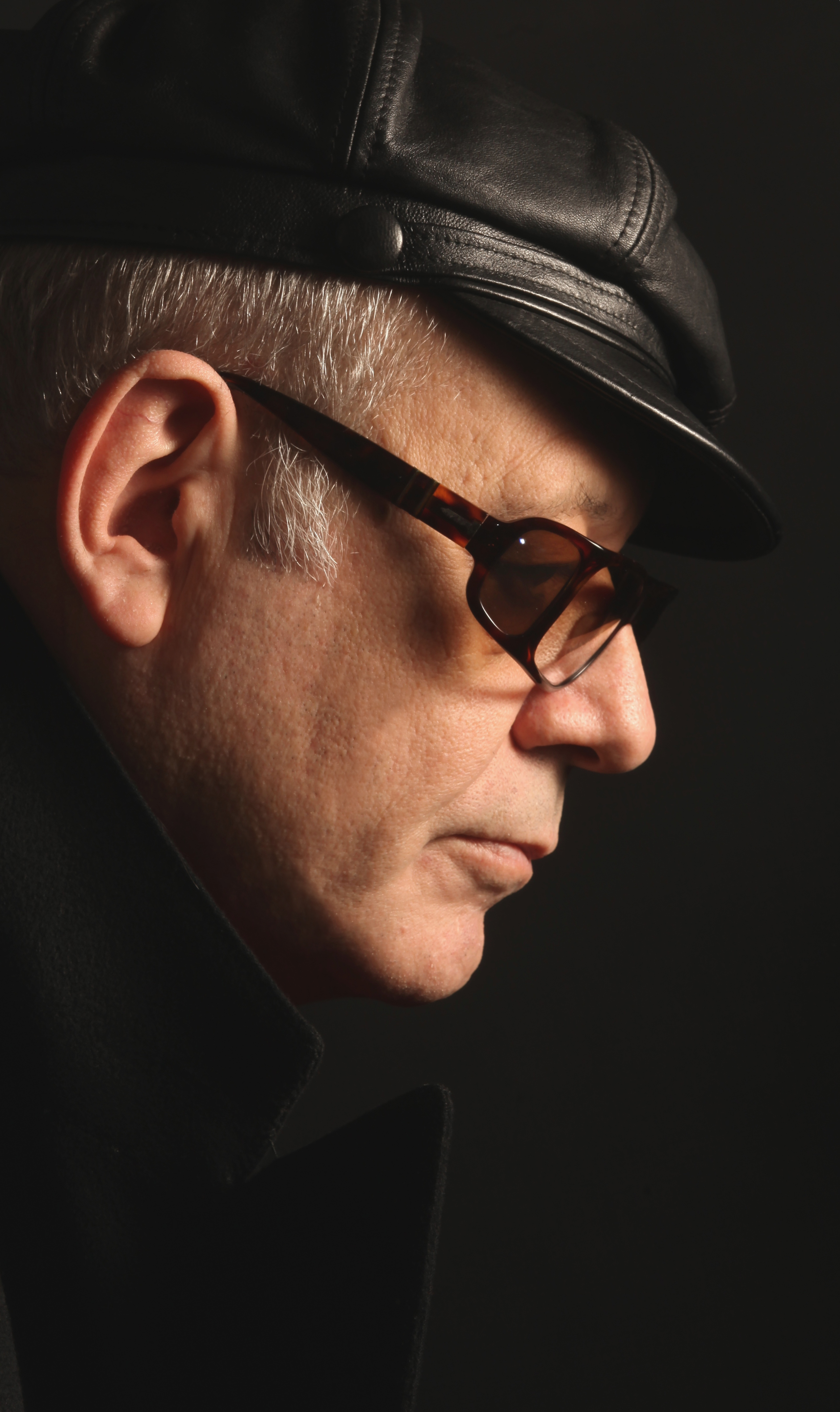
- Born: July 9, 1950; Kiev, USSR
- Occupation: poet, novelist, artist

Boris Levit-Broun (Russian: Левит-Броун, Борис Леонидович) is a Russian poet, writer, and artist.

== Early life ==
Boris Levit-Broun was born on July 9, 1950, in Kiev. His mother is Mira Raiz, a classical pianist and teacher. His father is Leonid Levit-Broun, a photographer and artist.

In 1967, Levit-Broun graduated from high school and tried unsuccessfully to enter the Department of History of Art, faculty of the Moscow State University. The same year Levit-Broun entered the Faculty of History and Theory of Art of the Kiev State Institute of Fine Arts, where he studied until 1973. In the spring of 1973, just before the discussion of his thesis, about the portrait work of Nikolai Ge, Levit-Broun was expelled from the Kiev State Art Institute for an "ideological cause".

== Career ==
From 1973–1975, Levit-Broun served in the Soviet Army in the Far East, where he began to write poetry. Demobilized and returned to Kiev, he abandoned poetry for 10 years. He worked in a photo lab, as photographer, and later became a jazz drummer and singer. From 1980 to 1988 he taught drums in a jazz school in Kiev.

In 1984 he returned to poetry. In 1986 he was invited as a leader vocalist in the jazz ensemble of Vladimir Karpovich at the Kiev House of Scientists, with whom he worked until he emigrated.

In 1989 he wrote his first major prose, the story Anketa ("About me"). In May of the same year he emigrated to Germany, where he spent the next six years. There, starting from 1991, he began to write religious and philosophical prose. HIs first book of poetry Požiznennyj dnevnik ("Lifelong Diary") was published in Kyiv in 1993. Later, Levit-Broun found editors in St. Petersburg, focusing his later publications on Russia.

In 1996, Levit-Broun and his wife moved Verona, Italy. Later his works were translated into foreign languages: a Russian-Romanian bilingual edition of his poetry was released in 2011, and a Russian-English bilingual book of his prose in 2012.

The scope of his creative activities encompasses, prose, religious philosophy, graphics, and photography. In Italy an album of erotic drawings by Levit-Broun Homo Erotikus 1997. In recent years, Levit-Broun became known as a jazz singer under the stage name of Boris Lebron. In 2008, he recorded in the studio with Fabio Cobelli.

Levit-Broun is a member of the Union of Writers of the twenty-first century. He is regularly published in Deti Ra (Children Ra), Futurum Art, Zinziver, Kreščatik, as well as web-publications: Persona plus, Relga and Zarubežnye Zadvorki (Foreign Backyards).
