= Crucifixus (Nikolay Ge) =

1884 painting by Russian artist Nikolai Ge

Crusifixus
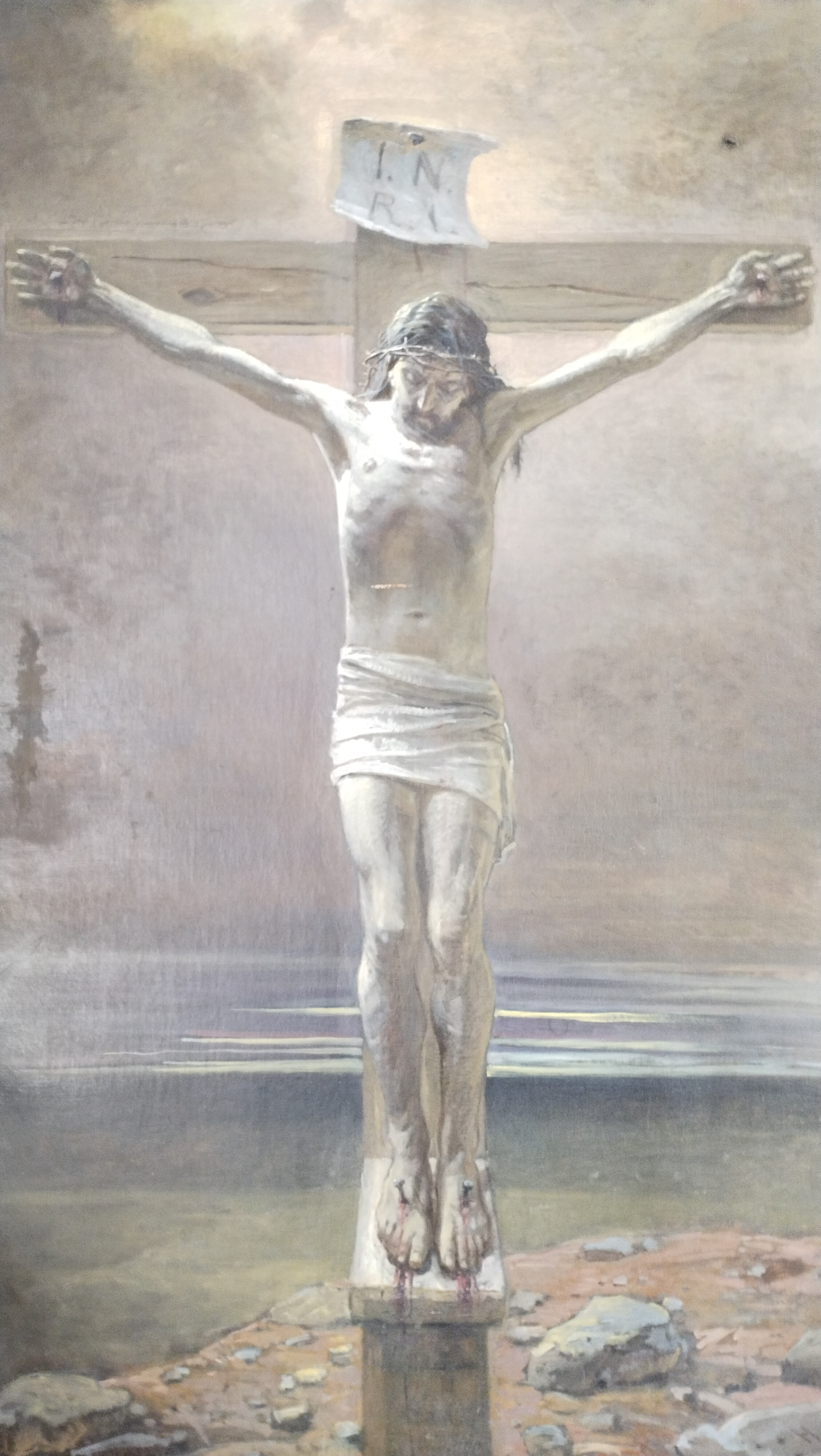
- Artist: Nikolai Ge
- Year: 1884
- Medium: Oil on canvas
- Dimensions: 195 cm × 140 cm (77 in ×)
- Location: Ataman Palace, part of the Museum of Don Cossacks, Novocherkassk

Crucifixus is an 1884 painting by Russian artist Nikolai Ge. It is housed in the collection of the Museum of Don Cossacks, Novocherkassk, where it forms part of the permanent exhibition at the Ataman Palace. Researchers believe that the painting was commissioned by an unidentified Lutheran or Catholic church. The painting was acquired by the museum prior to the Second World War, and during the 1970s, it was included in the exhibition of paintings by painters of the Society for Travelling Art Exhibitions.

Crucifixius drew the attention of art historians and culturologists in 2011, when the State Tretyakov Gallery prepared the exhibition, "What is Truth?'. Nikolai Ge. To the 180th anniversary of his birth." The canvas was subjected to infrared spectroscopy, the paint layer and ground were chemically analysed, and archival documents were lifted. A group of researchers presented a report on the painting at an international scientific conference in Moscow, held concurrently with the exhibition (the conference materials were published in 2014). In 2012, the scientific journal Russkoye Iskusstvo published a comprehensive article on the subject of Crucifixus. The article was authored by Tatiana Karpova, a Doctor of Art History, and Lidia Gladkova, Head of the Department of Scientific Expertise of the State Tretyakov Gallery.

In 2011-2012, the discovery of a new painting by Nikolai Ge was widely discussed in the Russian press. Articles devoted to the painting were published in leading central and regional print media. These include both business and socio-political publications, as well as tabloids: Rossiyskaya Gazeta, Moskovskij Komsomolets, Komsomolskaya Pravda, Argumenty i Fakty...

== Description ==
The painting is currently housed in the Museum of Don Cossacks in Novocherkassk. It is displayed in the permanent exposition on the first floor of the Ataman Palace. The painting is a vertically elongated rectangle measuring 195 × 140 cm in a simple wooden frame painted black. The technique used is oil painting on canvas.

The image is based on an episode from the New Testament concerning the execution of Jesus Christ. The action takes place on a low hill called Golgotha (translated from the Hebrew as 'The Throne Room'). Christ is depicted as already dead. His body remains crucified on a large wooden cross against the backdrop of a seashore, sea, and sky. A plaque above Christ's head abbreviates the Latin inscription "Jesus the Nazarene, King of the Jews". The Gospels of Luke and John mention the three languages in which the inscription was made, while the Gospels of Mark and Matthew only mention the inscription itself, without mentioning the three languages. The painting lacks the characters mentioned in the Gospels who were present at the execution: Mary, mother of Jesus, Mary of Clopas, Mary Magdalene, two robbers crucified on either side of Christ, the legionaries who "guarded" the cross and "scolded" Christ, the people, some "passers-by" who "cursed" Christ during the execution, and the Roman sotnik Longinus and John the Theologian, who are not mentioned in the Gospels but are considered by Christian tradition to be witnesses of Jesus' death. The time of the painting is the last rays of the setting sun.

The artist's signature and the date of creation of the canvas are inscribed in the lower right corner of one of the stones, reading "N. Ge. 1884".

== Discovery ==
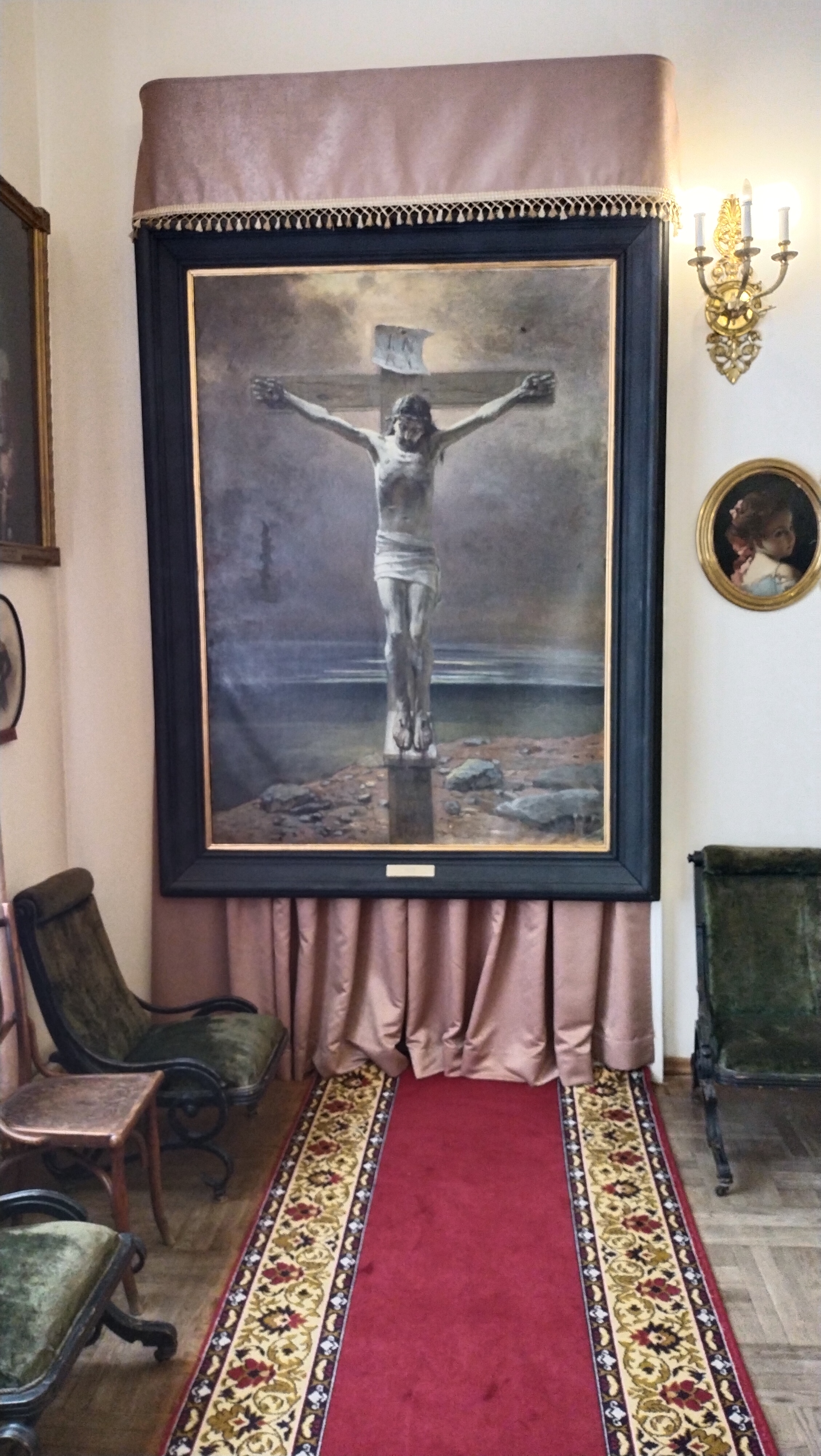
Nikolai Ge. Crucifixus in the interior of the Ataman Palace, July 2023

The Museum of Don Cossacks in Novocherkassk has a significant collection of Russian visual art, but the works of Nikolai Ge are not mentioned in the guidebooks published during the Soviet era, either as part of the museum's exhibition or in its storerooms. In October 2011, the newspaper Komsomolskaya Pravda reported that experts from the State Tretyakov Gallery were working on the funds of the Museum of Don Cossacks in the city of Novocherkassk to determine the authenticity of the painting Crucifixus by Nikolai Ge. Moscow experts told the newspaper's correspondent that until 2011 Russian art historians had not recognised Crucifixus as the work of Nikolai Ge. However, the museum's records still list the painting as a creation by this artist. At the time of the article's publication, the attribution process was expected to take several weeks.

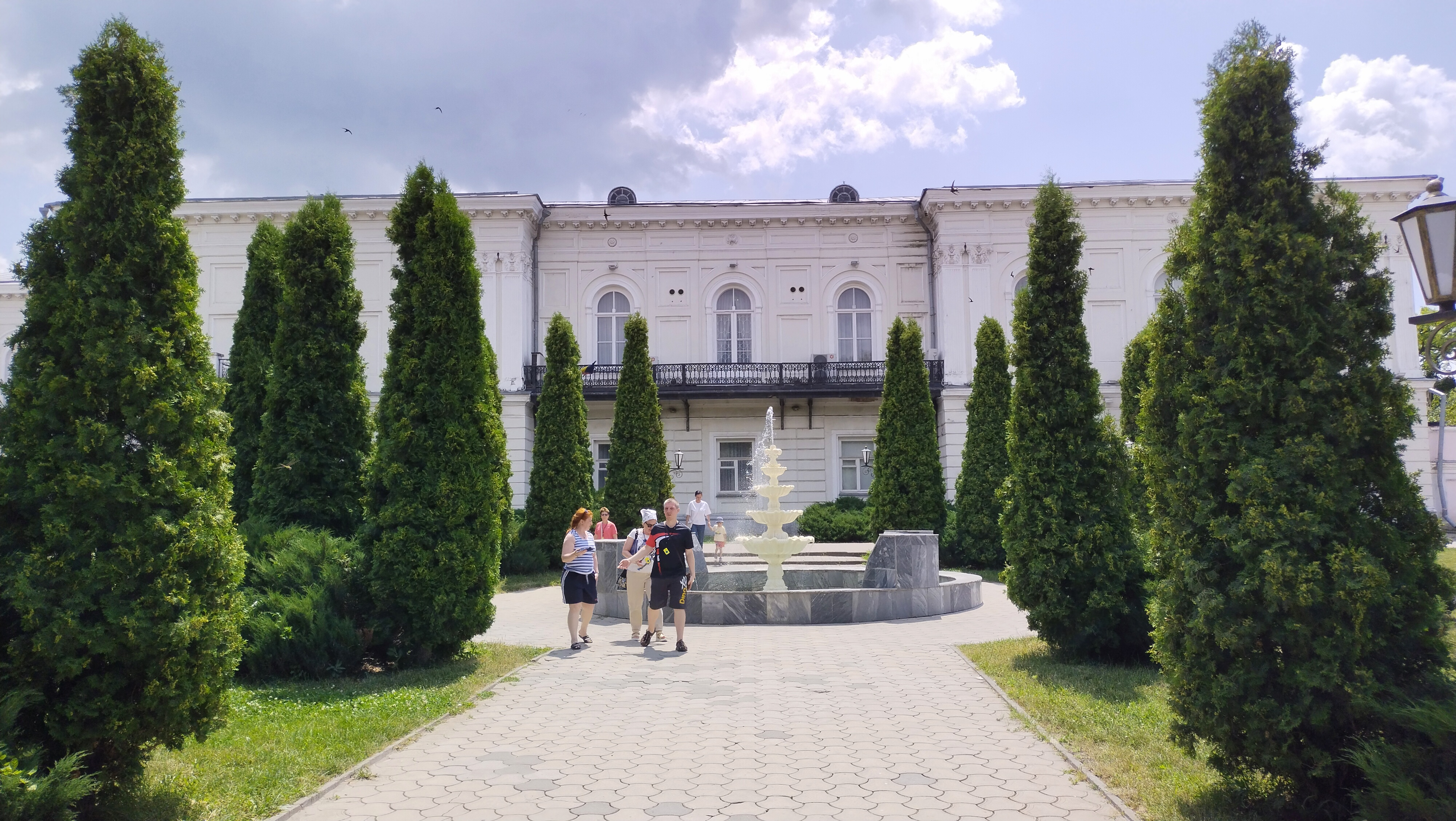
Ataman Palace in Novocherkassk, a building where the art collection of the Museum of Don Cossacks is on display, June 2023

In 2012 and 2014, expert reports were published in the form of articles in scientific publications, which showed that during the preparation of the exhibition 'What is Truth?' Nikolai Ge. To the 180th anniversary of his birth (2011–2012), a painting almost unknown even to experts of the artist's work was discovered in the resources of the Museum of Don Cossacks. It was a large vertical Crucifixus. What prompted specialists to study the canvas was the discovery in the archive of Polina Chernyshyova, daughter of the Soviet artist Nikolai Chernyshyov, of a letter from the director of this museum, Leonid Sholokhov, to Chernyshyov, dated 17 April 1961. It was a response to the artist's enquiry about the painting Crucifixus by Nikolai Ge, which Chernyshyov had been informed could be in the museum. The letter from Sholokhov confirmed that the museum indeed possessed the painting in question, which was signed by Nikolai Ge. Its dimensions were given as 195 × 140 cm. The work was dated 1884 by the artist himself. Sholokhov reported that the painting had come to the museum in the 1920s from an unknown "lutheran church or catholic church." The letter from the museum director was accompanied by a black and white photograph of Crucifixus (some sources claim that there were two such photographs attached to the letter).

The staff of the Novocherkassk museum reported the presence of the Crucifixus in the museum's holdings in response to a request from the organisers of an exhibition of works by Nikolai Ge in Moscow to confirm the information obtained from Sholokhov's letter.

Two articles were published bearing the same title, "Nikolai Ge's 'Crucifixus' from Novocherkassk". One was published in the magazine Russkoye Iskusstvo in 2012, and the second was published under the auspices of the State Institute of Art History in 2014. The authors of the articles presented a report at an international conference in Moscow, which proposed that Chernyshev may have obtained information about the painting from Mikhail Teplov, an officer and amateur artist who was a student of Ge and the author of memoirs about him (the collective report of the researchers involved in the scientific expertise was read out on 30 January 2012 at the conference 'N. N. Ge. To the 180th anniversary of his birth' in the Tretyakov Gallery). From 1884 to 1888, during the creation of Crucifixus, Teplov lived on a khutor with Nikolai Ge. The Museum of Arts of Uzbekistan in Tashkent houses a portrait of Teplov, created by Nikolai Ge in 1885. Chernyshev encountered Teplov in Tashkent during the evacuation in 1941.

== Debate on authorship ==
The hypothesis that Nikolai Ge was the author of the painting from Novocherkassk had yet to be proven. Following the conclusion of the exhibition, entitled What is Truth? Nikolai Ge. On the 180th anniversary of his birth, and the international scientific conference that accompanied it, the correspondence between the museum, as well as another photograph of the painting were discovered in the archive of Natalia Zograf, a Soviet art historian who curated the exhibition of Nikolai Ge in 1970-1971. On 16 December 1965, O.E. Voronina, deputy director of the museum for the scientific part, wrote to Zograf (with the punctuation of the original preserved), as follows:

How and when it [the painting "Crucifixion"] ended up in our museum—no one knows. All we know is that the painting has been in the museum for a long time, it was already [here] before the war. I am sending you a photograph of this painting. It would be extremely interesting for us to receive a definitive answer, but it is unlikely this will be possible with just a photograph of the painting. In response to my inquiry at the Research Museum of the Academy of Arts of the USSR in Leningrad, I received a reply, a copy of which I am sending to you. The same uncertainty, the same doubts I had before. It seems to me that resolving this question requires direct work on this canvas, as there is much that is unclear here. This piece does not look like the work of N. N. Ge. But then, why is it signed by him? If it is a copy of an unknown work by Ge, then again—why are there both a signature and a date? Does the signature resemble those on his other canvases? We, not having other works by N. N. Ge, could not judge this. I am very happy that you are interested in this painting, maybe you will succeed in establishing its authenticity. I would really ask you to let me know in any case.

— Tatiana Karpova, Lidia Gladkova, Irina Rustamova, Evgenia Sitlivaya, 'Crucifixus' by Nikolai Ge from Novocherkassk

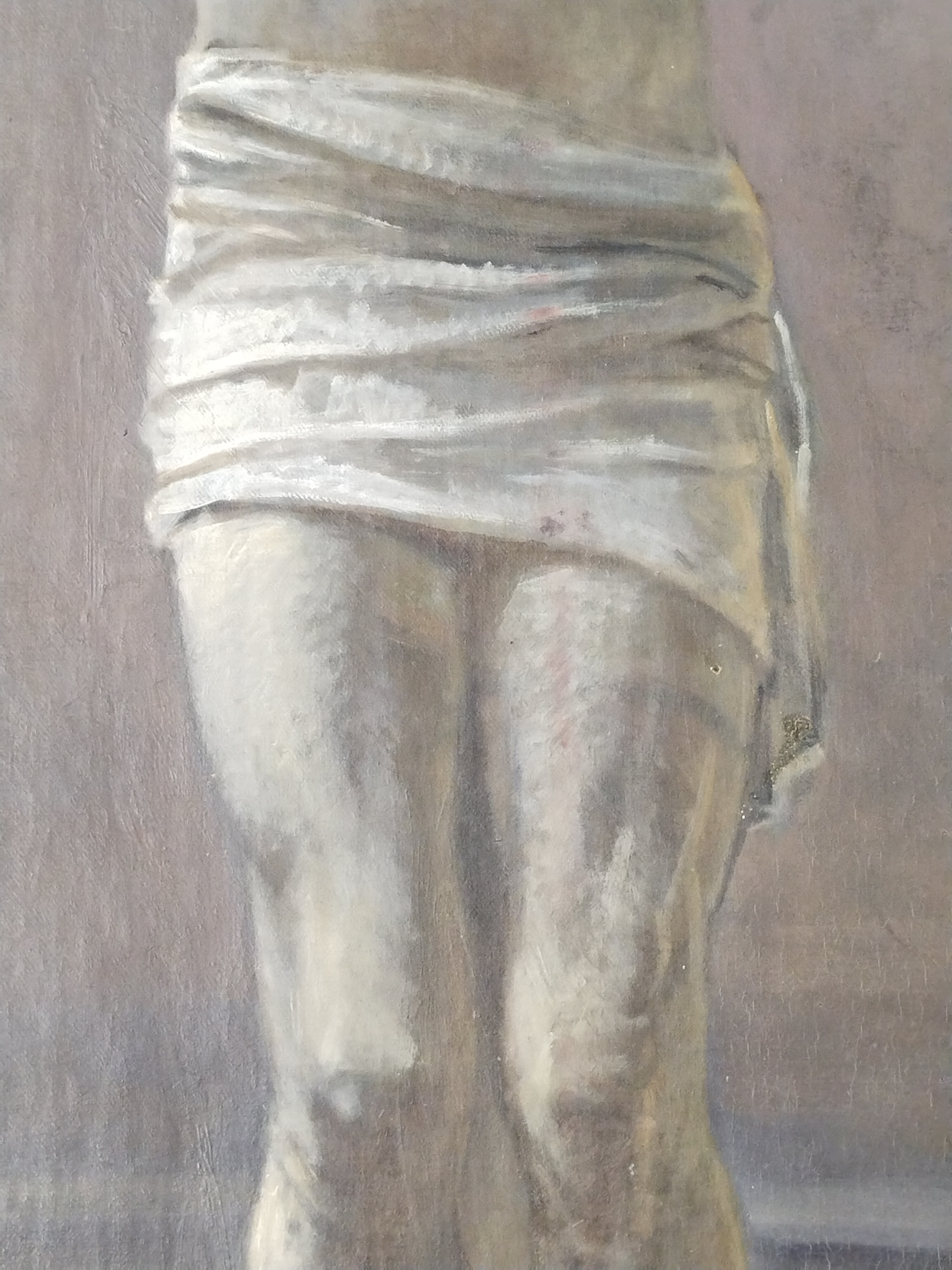
The lower part of Christ's body

The letter was accompanied by a copy of a reply from the Research Museum of the Academy of Arts of the USSR, dated 7 May 1964, signed by the head of the painting department, L. F. Galich. In her written response, the art historian stated that, based on the provided photograph, the painting in question does not appear to be the work of Ge. She presented two arguments to support this assertion: firstly, that Ge did not address the theme of the crucifixion in the 1880s and created a markedly different representation of Christ in the 1890s. Secondly, the canvas displays the characteristics of an Altarpiece. It can be reasonably assumed that Nicholas Ge created this work for an Orthodox church, but in this case the image of Christ would have to be more "canonical". Thirdly, it is challenging to ascertain the artist's identity solely from the photograph, as the canvas's colour scheme is not discernible. Galich formulated her conclusion as follows: "On the whole, the thing raises great doubt that it was painted by Ge".

Natalia Zograf was never able to view the painting in the Museum of Don Cossacks in person. While compiling a catalogue of the artist's paintings, she did not include the Crucifixus from Novocherkassk not only among the originals, but even among the works that are open to question by art historians.

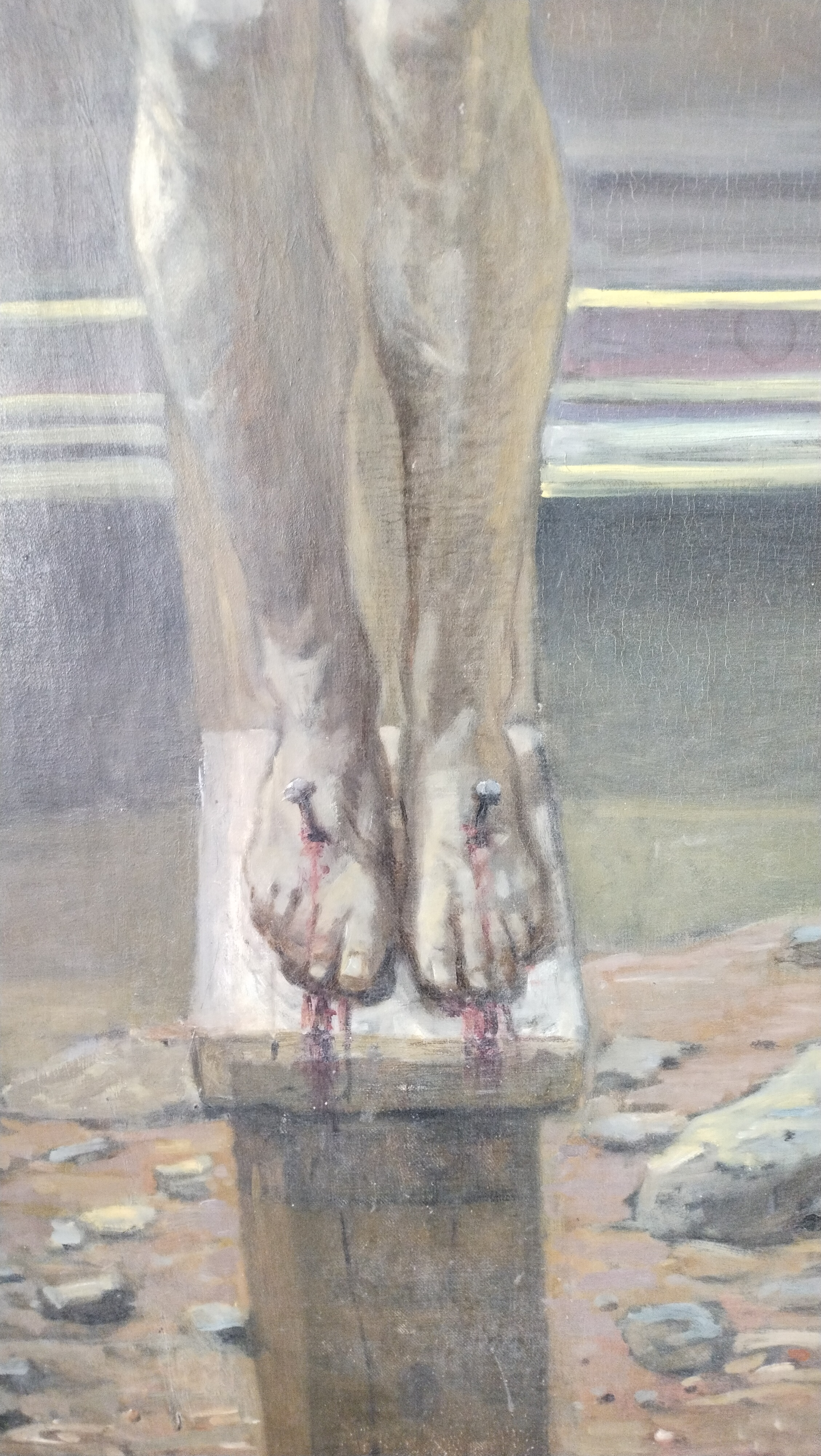
Christ's shins and feet

In the autumn of 2011, Tatiana Karpova, the curator of the exhibition 'What is Truth?'. Nikolai Ge. To the 180th anniversary of his birth, together with members of the Expertise Department of the State Tretyakov Gallery (Lidia Gladkova, Tatiana Rustamova and Vladimir Voronov), undertook an analysis of the painting during a visit to Novocherkassk. The collected material was subjected to a comparative analysis with the paintings identified as etalon works in the oeuvre of Nikolai Ge. The researchers concluded that the artist was indeed the author of the paintings in question.

In their two publications and in a speech delivered at a scientific forum in Moscow, the experts presented a detailed account of their arguments. An analysis of the infrared radiation spectrum revealed a multitude of alterations on the painting, predominantly pertaining to the positioning of the figure of Jesus Christ. In particular, the figure was shifted to the right. The changes also affected the shape of the hands and the bending of the arms at the elbows. The artist peeled off the original image of Christ's face rather than painting a new one over it, as he had done with all the other details. The width of the crossbar was reduced. Changes were made to the column, the outline of the inscription 'INRI' on the tablet above Christ's head and the cloth on his thighs.

The presence of authorial changes on the canvas is a defining characteristic of Nikolai Ge's creative handwriting, according to researchers. Additionally, researchers have identified another indicator of Nikolai Ge's authorship on the painting, namely the combination of fragments "loaded with colour paste" and the ground that is barely covered with paint.

A resemblance to Ge's painting In the Garden of Gethsemane was discerned in the portrayal of facial features, including the nose, eye sockets, brow arches, distribution of light and shadow, the form and direction of movement of strokes, the manner of depicting strands of hair in texture and colour, and the depiction of stones. There are similarities with the painting What is Truth? Christ and Pilate in the peculiarities of the construction of the wrists and hands of the figures, as well as in the representation of the background (the colouring of the landscape at the feet of Christ in the Crucifixus and the section of the wall between the figures of Pontius Pilate and Jesus Christ coincide). The forged nails with round caps are similar to those in the Crucifixion of 1892.

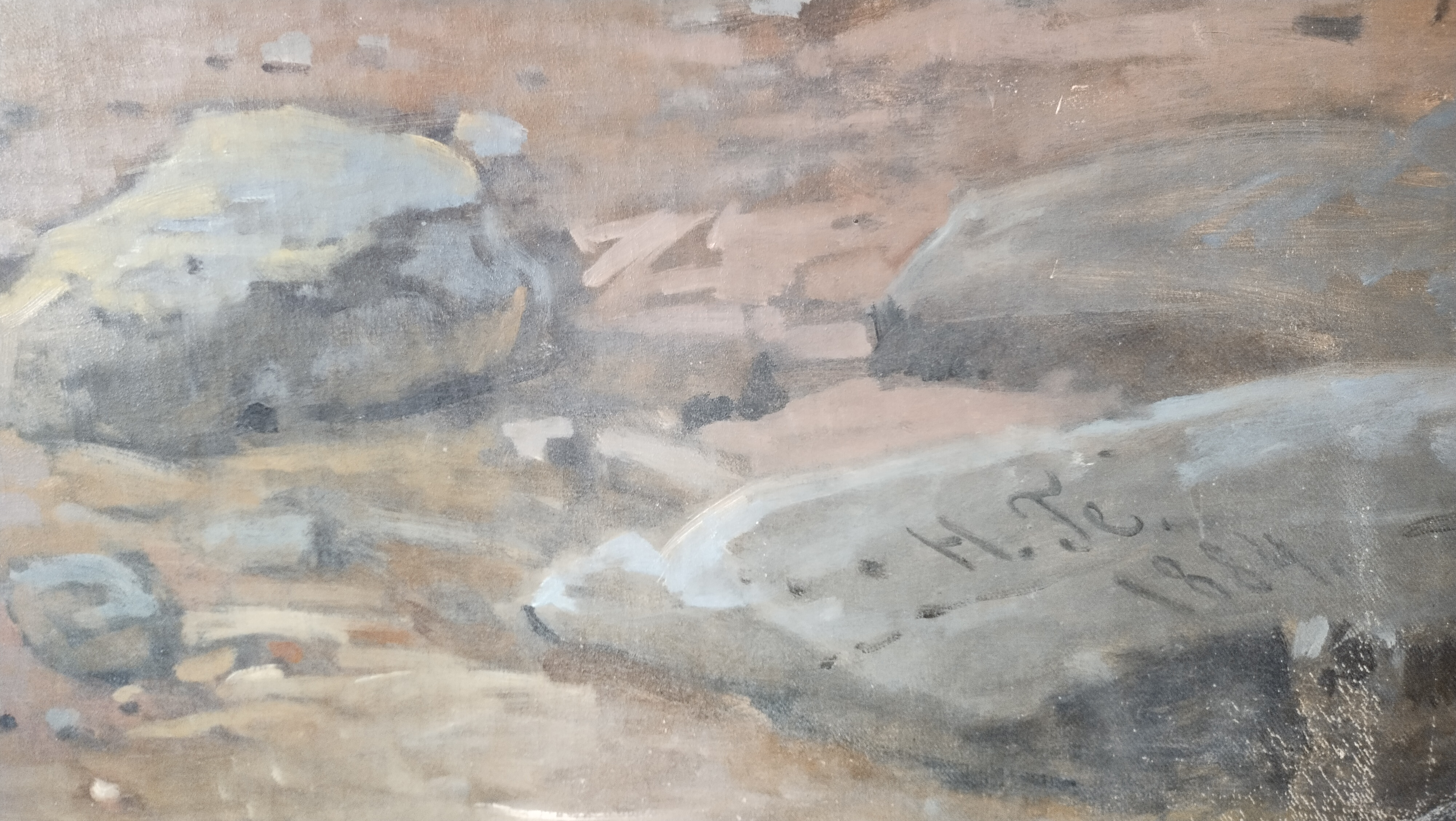
Fragment of the painting with the artist's signature in the lower right corner

The similarity with Ge's paintings is also evident in the colour scheme of the Crucifixus of 1884. Light highlights are covered by thin "swipes" of ochres and blues. The colours in the painting include white lead, zinc white (in admixtures), blue cobalt, brown and red ochre, mercury and yellow zinc cinnabar, charcoal and black organic pigment. Most of them were actively used by Nikolai Ge in various combinations. The chemical composition of the colours in the 1884 Novocherkassk painting does not contradict the date on the canvas. The ground is single-layer, but its composition is the same as the two-layer ground used by the artist in Portrait of Shestova with Her Daughter and In the Garden of Gethsemane.

The artist's signature "N. Ge. 1884", in the lower right-hand corner of the painting, is written on the dry layer of paint and has a craquelure character in common with other areas of the canvas. It corresponds to the artist's autographs.

A significant number of works by Nikolai Ge feature black, simple frames, as exemplified by the Crucifixus. Additionally, the doctor and biographer of Leo Tolstoy, Dusan Makovitsky, claimed that Ge "saved up" on frames.

The composition of the painting is similar to that of Ge's drawing of the Crucifixion of Jesus, which is part of the collection of Christoph Bohlmann and is currently held by the State Tretyakov Gallery.

The authors explain the stylistic differences with the work of Nikolai Ge, which are present yet unidentified in the collective articles of 2012 and 2014, by the unusual purpose of the canvas. The painting was to be housed in a non-Orthodox church. Additionally, the artist may have been bound by conditions of the order that are unknown to us. Among these conditions, there could be an orientation to a sample of a Western European master. The authors of the article hypothesise that this sample may be a painting by the French artist Léon Bonnat from 1874, which is held in the Petit Palais Museum in Paris. In this painting, the crucified Christ is depicted against the backdrop of the sea. Both paintings also share the position of Christ's feet and the characteristic sunset lighting.

Works by Nikolai Ge and Léon Bonnat, which were compared during the examination of the painting Crucifixus

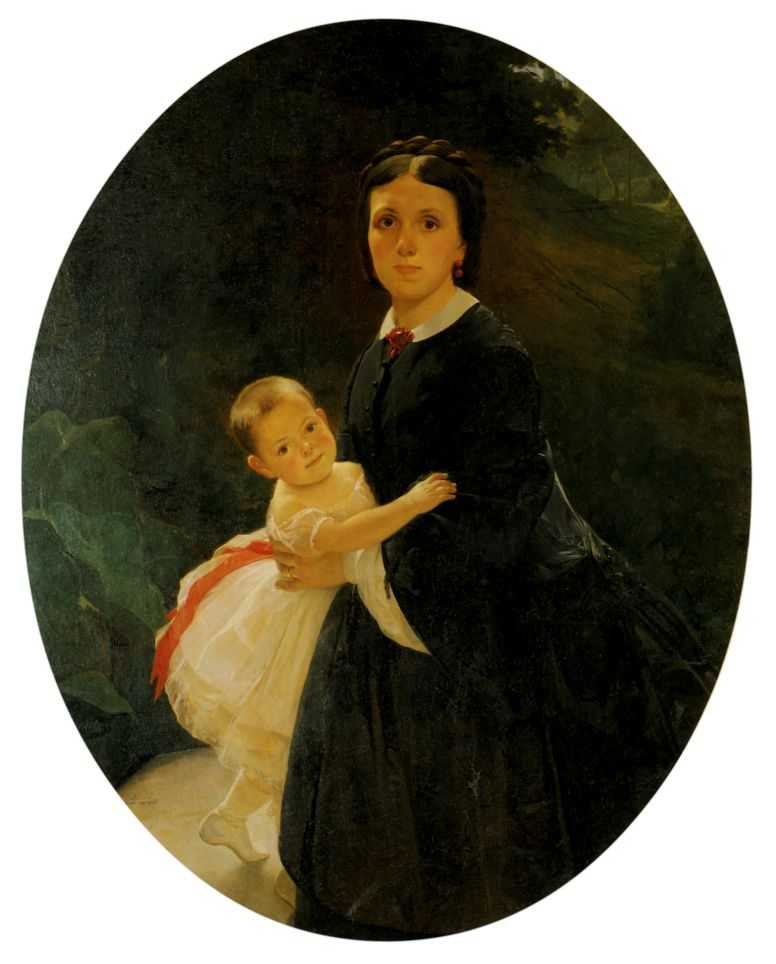
Portrait of Shestova and her daughter, 1859

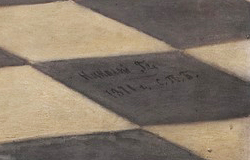
Signature of Nikolai Ge and date in the lower right corner of the painting Peter the Great Interrogating the Tsarevich Alexei Petrovich at Peterhof, 1871

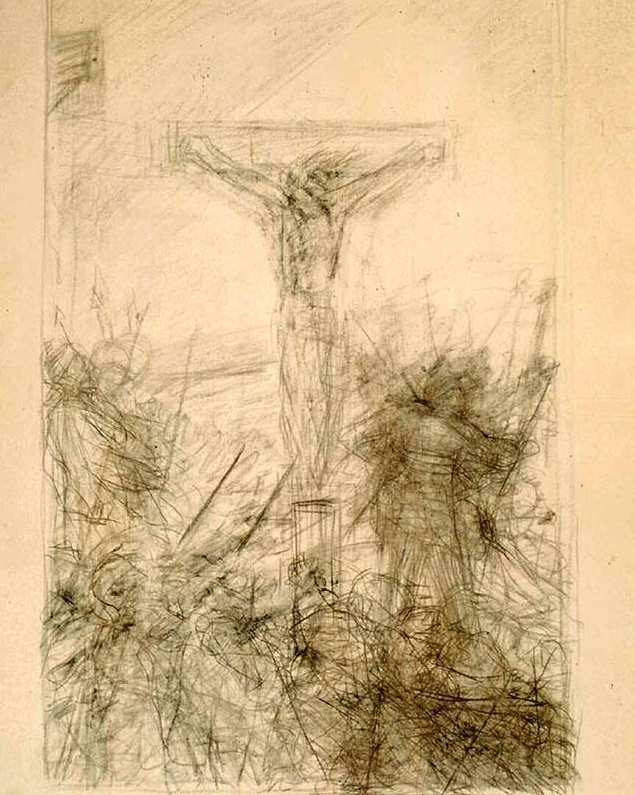
Crucifixus from the collection of Christoph Bohlmann, date unknown

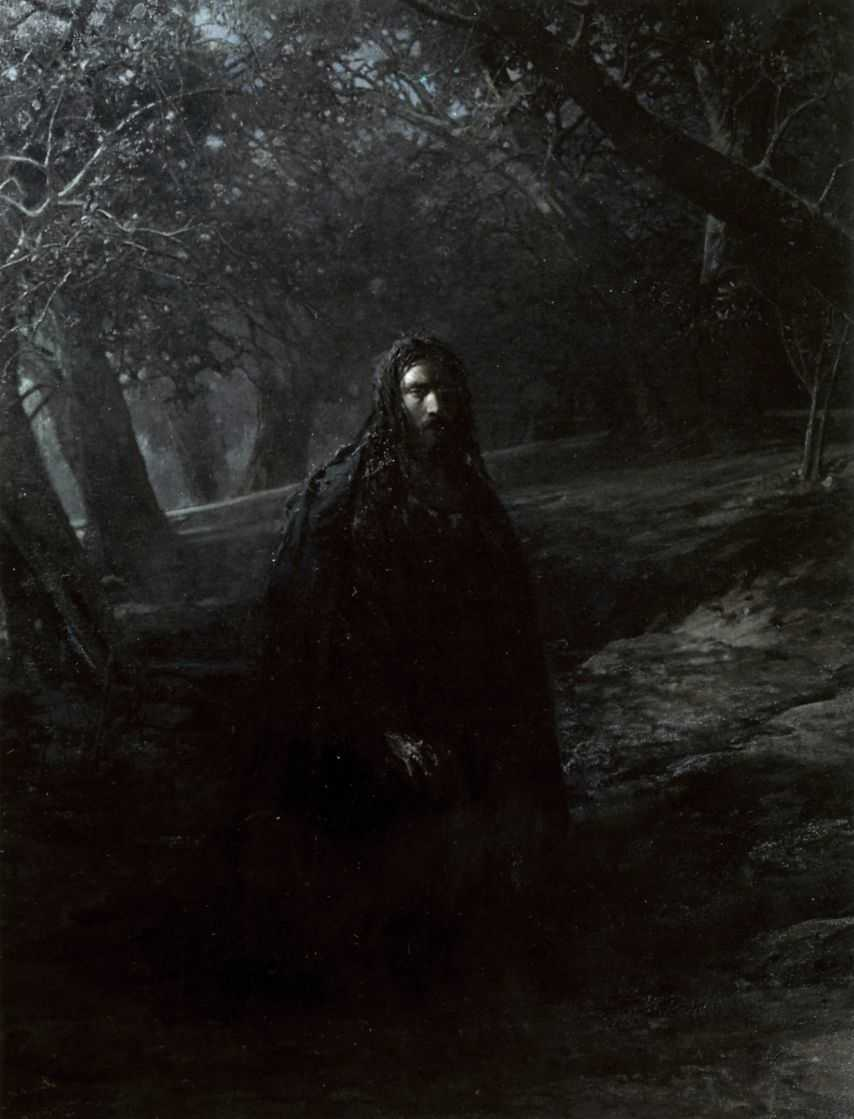
In the Garden of Gethsemane, between 1869 and 1880

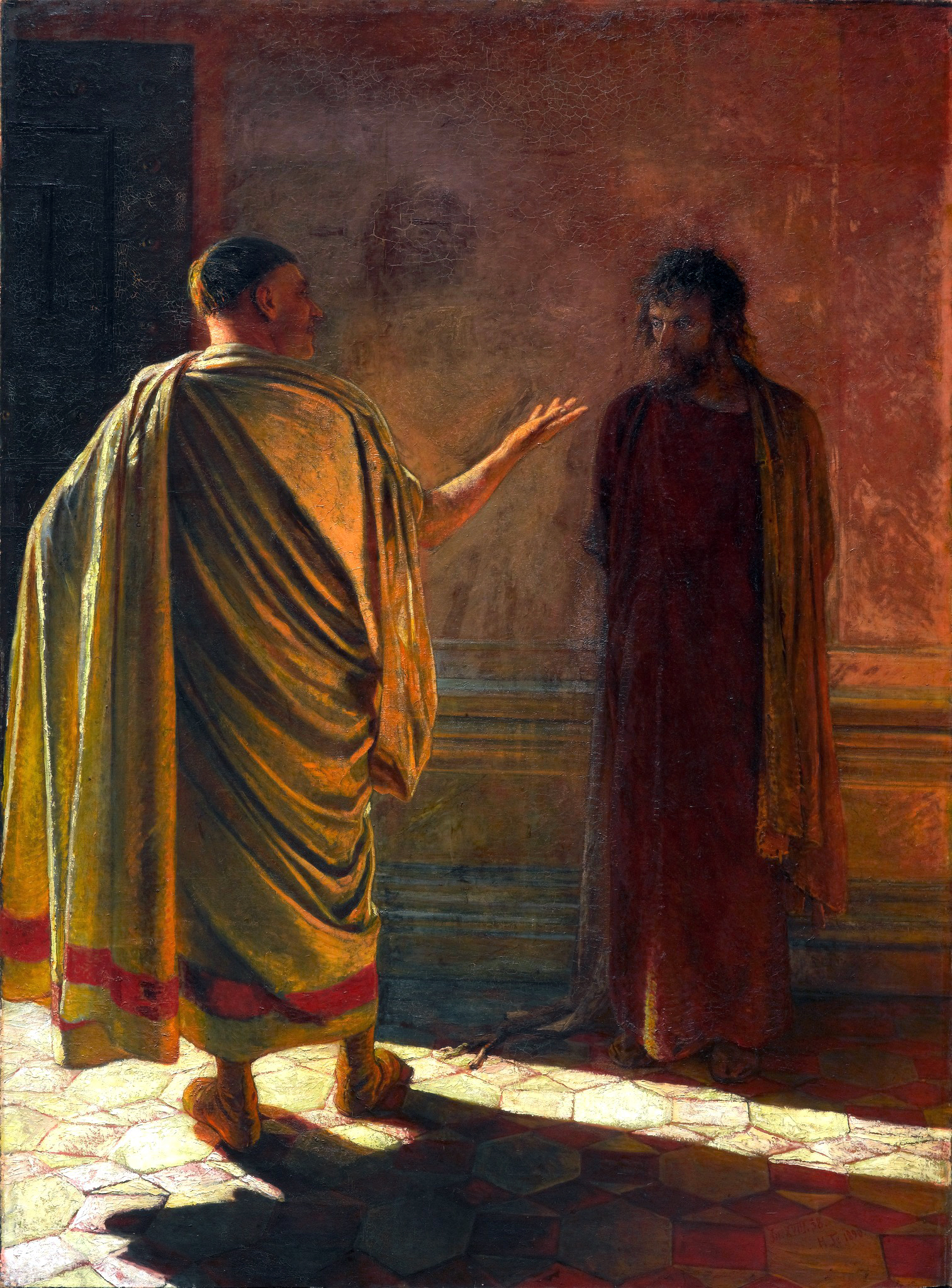
What is truth? Christ before Pilate, 1890

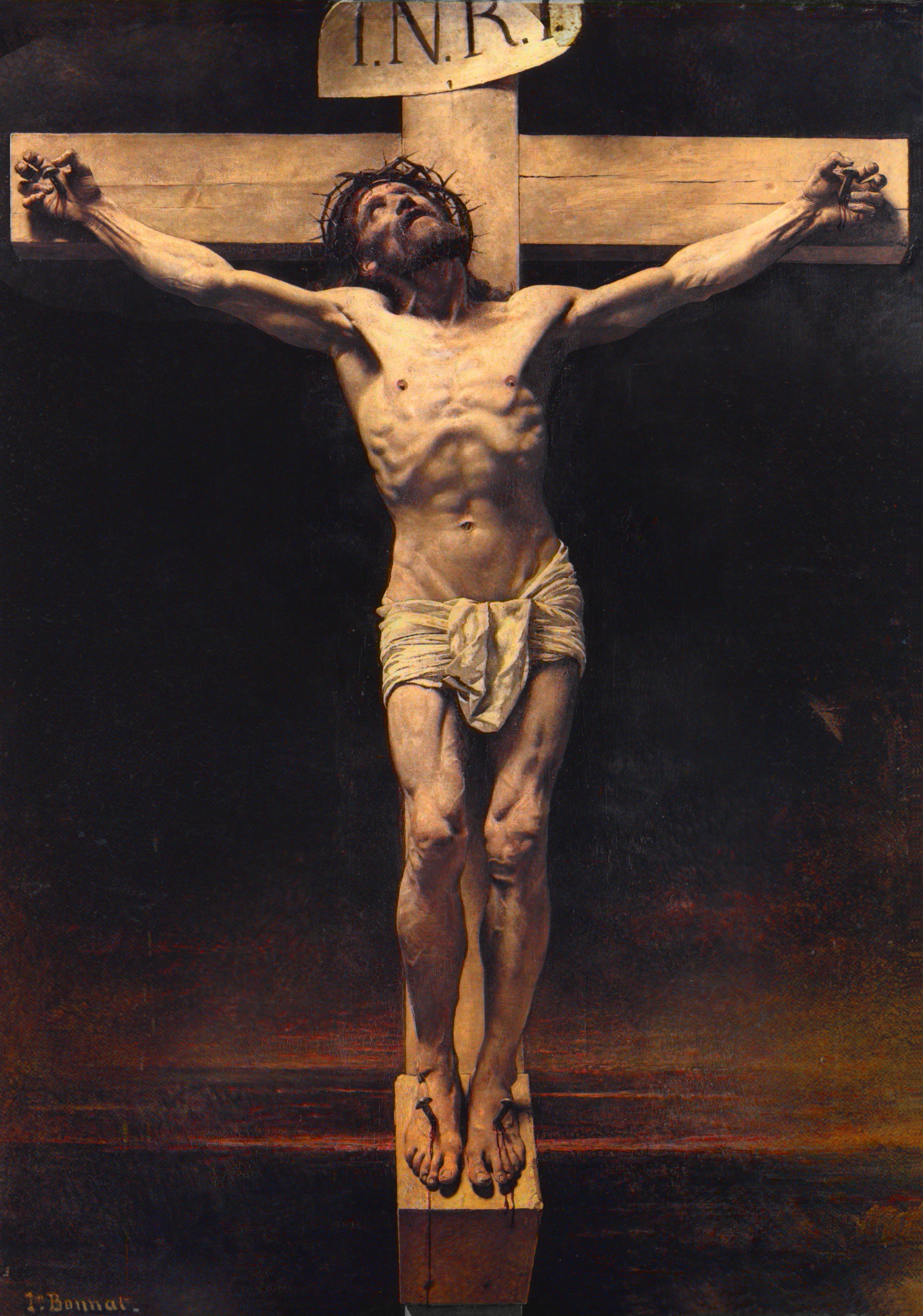
Léon Bonnat. The Crucifixion, 1874

== History of creation ==
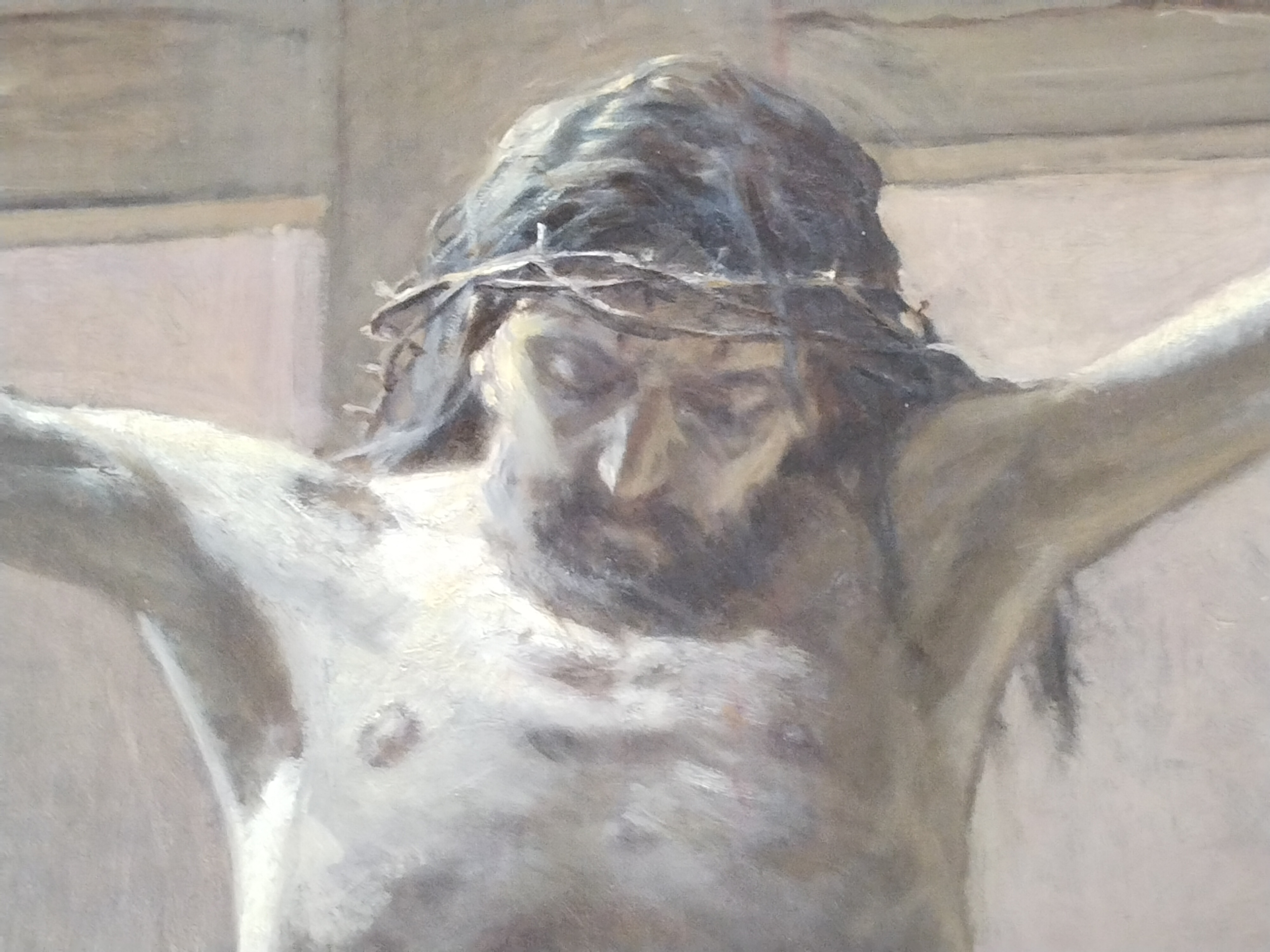
Christ's face

The pre-war documentation of the Museum of Don Cossacks and the materials of the Novocherkassk city archive, which could have provided insight into the circumstances surrounding the creation of Nikolai Ge's painting, have not survived. They were destroyed during World War II, when the city was occupied by Nazi troops. A review of the correspondence of Nikolai Ge, along with the memoirs of his contemporaries, reveals no direct references to the history of creation or the existence of the canvas entitled Crucifixus from the collection of the Museum of Don Cossacks. However, there is indirect evidence suggesting that the artist commenced work on this theme in 1884. A letter from the artist to Leo Tolstoy, dated 28 February 1884, contains the following lines: "I have composed paintings that you would approve of. One is terrible: the execution of Christ on the cross, the other is the beginning, a premonition of the coming suffering. I can neither feel nor understand anything else." The authors of the collective articles, "'Crucifixus' by Nikolai Ge from Novocherkassk", posit that this letter pertains to the initial iterations of Ge's paintings, Crucifixus and Golgotha.

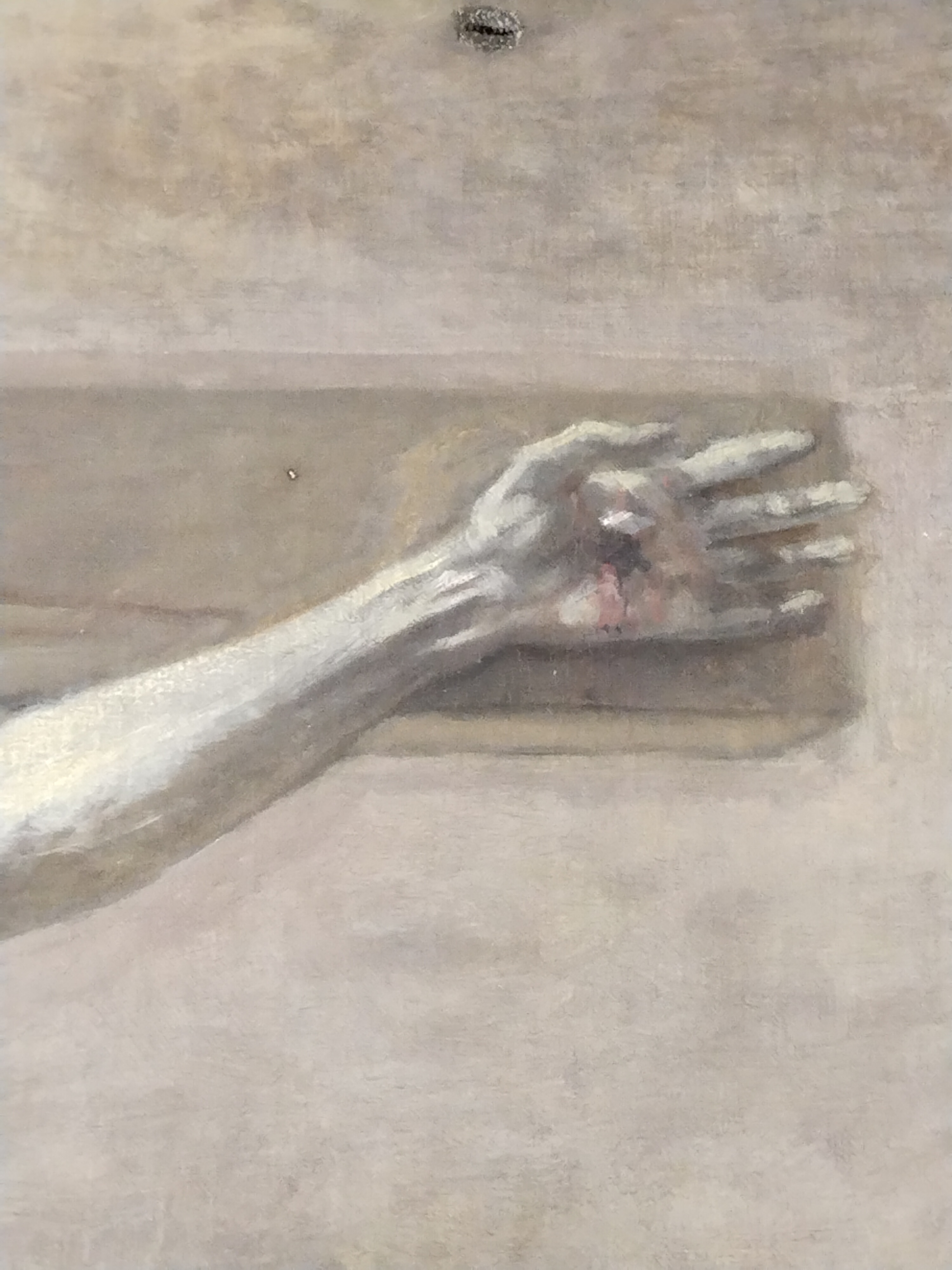
Christ's left hand

There is also a description of one of the variants of the Crucifixus created by Nikolai Ge in 1884, which, according to the authors of the articles, is comparable in some aspects to the Novocherkassk canvas. This Crucifixus was later destroyed by the artist himself. The description belongs to the Russian watercolourist Ekaterina Junge: "On one visit I saw his almost completely finished painting Crucifixus [in the text of the original without inverted commas]. In painting and drawing, it seems to me, it was the best of his paintings. The background consisted of the wall of the city and raised by a blizzard, somehow ominously illuminated yellow sand; the body of Christ, raised high on the cross and wonderfully painted in grey halftones, stood out in relief against the light, warm background and seemed to step out of the frame. There were no robbers - only parts of their crosses were visible. Below the rock on which the Cross stood, to the left of the picture, one could see a sea of the heads of the scattered people and Mary Magdalene, who, clutching the rock with her hands, lifted herself up on them, and could not tear herself away from the sight that stupefied her... There was nothing spiritual left on that face - it was a moment of death, an agonising death - and nothing else." This version of the Crucifixus was destroyed by Nikolai Ge in 1885.

The assumption that the painting came from a non-Orthodox temple was supported by the authors of the 2014 collective article. They saw indirect confirmation of this in the presence of drops of wax on the canvas. Given the assumption that the Crucifixus could have come from a Catholic or a Lutheran church, the researchers tried to determine what kind of church it was. There was a Lutheran church in Novocherkassk, but it was not built until 1898. In Rostov-on-Don, on the other hand, the Lutheran congregation had existed since 1856, but the foundation stone of the church was only laid in 1885. The building was only consecrated in 1888. At present there are no documents describing its interior. The researchers concluded that it is not yet possible to say definitively that the painting was commissioned by a particular church. The painting's ecclesiastical commission should not be questioned, and the previously held view that Ge never worked for ecclesiastical commissions is incorrect.

== Art historians and culturologists about the canvas ==
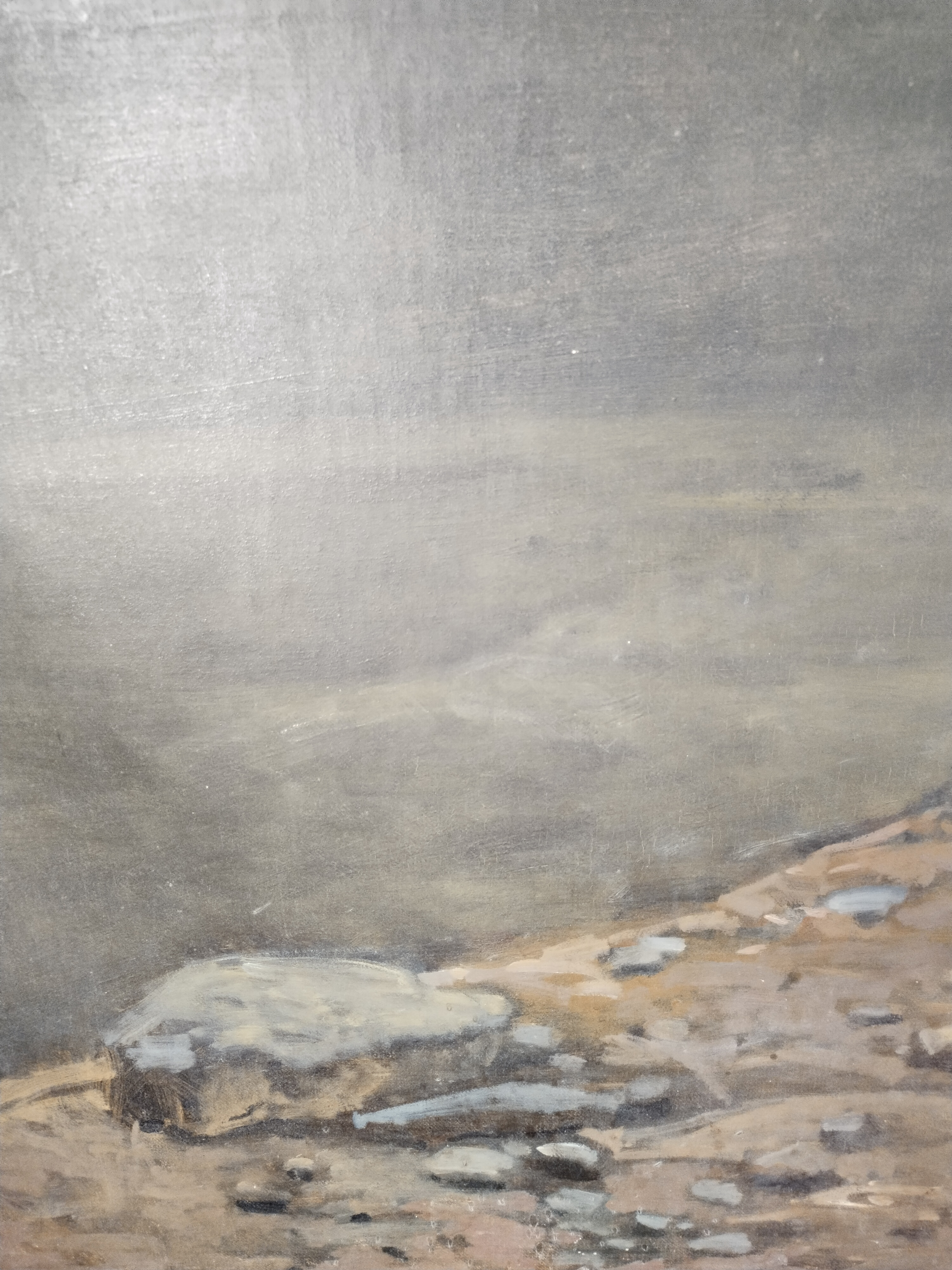
Fragment of the landscape in the lower left part of the canvas

In their 2014 article, the authors highlight the distinctive characteristics of the landscape depicted in the painting, including the dark night with the glow of sunset, the smoothness of the sea and the moonlight over the rocky shore. They argue that these elements collectively evoke a "symbolic supra-worldly image."

Lubov Petrunina, a candidate of philosophy and senior researcher at the State Tretyakov Gallery, in her article "Nikolai Ge's exhibition 'What is Truth?' in the perception of the public" noted that the public's attention in connection with the exhibition of Ge's paintings in Moscow in 2011-2012 was offered "a twist of an almost detective story concerning the fate of Nikolai Ge's creative heritage" - the discovery of the Crucifixus in the funds of the Novocherkassk Museum. The staff of the Tretyakov Gallery confirmed the artist's authorship on the basis of "radiological and scientific research". In the end, the gallery's attribution committee decided to add the painting to the artist's Passion series. Petrunina noted wryly that "this event made it possible to keep Nikolai Ge's name in the orbit of public attention for a while longer."

In an article for the journal Nauka i Zhizn, Zinaida Korotkova, a teacher at the Moscow Academic Art Lyceum of the Russian Academy of Arts and an artist, observed that the principal documents pertaining to the life and work of Nikolai Ge have already been incorporated into the scientific corpus. Consequently, the likelihood of a significant discovery in this area is exceedingly low. It is not known how Chernyshev reacted to receiving the letter about the Crucifixus. The author of the article assumes that he went to Novocherkassk immediately. The painting Crucifixus had already been exhibited once in Moscow at the exhibition of the Peredvizhniki, but at that time it did not arouse much interest among experts. Subsequently, the painting was returned to the Museum of Don Cossacks. Sholokhov's letter was archived and remained unexamined until preparations for an exhibition of Nikolai Ge's paintings in Moscow in 2011-2012 prompted a re-examination of the material.

The researchers of the painting observed that the canvas has already been the subject of mass media publications and, in accordance with the hypothesis of Zinaida Korotkova, it will subsequently be exhibited not only in the Russian Federation but also abroad.

Following the exhibition 'What is Truth?'. Nikolai Ge. To the 180th anniversary of his birth, held in Moscow, an exhibition of the painting Crusifixus was organised in Novocherkassk. In March 2012, the Rostov newspaper Nashe Vremya published an article on the painting in connection with a demonstration of the Crucifixus at the Regional Museum of Fine Arts. It was an exhibition of "one painting" as well, accompanied by works from 19th-century graphic art, Old Russian iconography, and decorative and applied art from the 18th and 19th centuries.

In 2016, Nikolai Ge's painting was the focal point of the temporary exhibition, Faces of Holy Faith and Love, held at the Museum of Don Cossacks. The exhibition included Orthodox icons and paintings unified by the concept of repentance during the Great Lent, during which the exhibition was held. Additionally, it showcased church antiquities, 19th-century portraits, including those of priests and martyrs, and photographs of the Nekrasov Cossacks.

== In the mass media ==
In 2011-2012, the Russian press engaged in lively discussion surrounding the discovery of a new painting by Nikolai Ge. Articles pertaining to this topic were published in a number of prominent central and regional print media outlets, including Rossiyskaya Gazeta, Moskovskij Komsomolets, Komsomolskaya Pravda and Argumenty i Fakty.

External videos
- Video clip of the Museum of Don Cossacks. Nikolai Ge's painting 'Crucifixus', 2020

The article in Moskovsky Komsomolets contains excerpts from interviews with Evgenia Svitliva, deputy director of the Novocherkassk Museum of Scientific Work, Tatiana Karpova, Doctor of Art History, and Victoria Naumenko, the chief curator of the Museum of Don Cossacks, who provide insights into the history of the discovery of the painting by Nikolai Ge, which were not included in the scientific publications devoted to it. In particular, it has been reported that Polina Chernyshyova, the daughter of the artist Nikolai Chernyshyov, extended an invitation to the researchers preparing the exhibition in Moscow to get acquainted with a photograph of Ge's studio on the farm Ivanovskoye near Rostov-on-Don, where he lived from 1876 to 1894. Furthermore, she presented a comprehensive folder of materials pertaining to the artist, which were stored in her father's archive, during a personal meeting with them. In the course of examining the documents contained in this folder, Tatyana Karpova came across a letter from the director of the Museum of Don Cossacks to Chernyshyov, which was dated 17 April 1961. The article specifies the date on which the canvas was exhibited at an exhibition dedicated to the Peredvizhniki, which took place in the 1970s.

The article in Rossiyskaya Gazeta is based on an interview conducted by a correspondent with Lidia Gladkova, the head of the scientific expertise department at the State Tretyakov Gallery. She referenced the hypothesis posited during the examination of the painting, namely that the Crucifixus may represent the initial iteration of the painting Golgotha, which is currently housed in the Tretyakov Gallery. Gladkova asserted that the painting had been exhibited at the Novocherkassk museum prior to the Great Patriotic War and that it had participated in an exhibition of works by the Peredvizhniki in the 1970s. At the time of the article's publication, chemical analysis of the soil confirmed the authenticity of the painting. A radiographic study was initially planned, but the Novocherkassk museum lacked the necessary equipment. Furthermore, transporting the painting to Moscow on specialised transport with security personnel would have been too expensive. It was anticipated that the personnel of the Tretyakov Gallery would transport a portable X-ray machine to Novocherkassk for a final examination.

The Russian online news agency Life published an article about the discovery of the painting. It includes a statement by Elena Svetlykh, deputy director of the Novocherkassk museum, that before the recently discovered Crucifixus, "Ge painted four similar subjects, only they were all sent to the oven"; she also noted that it was "a work of uncharacteristically large size for Ge." The article concludes by saying that, despite the good condition of the canvas, "in the near future the 'Crucifixus' will be sent for restoration."

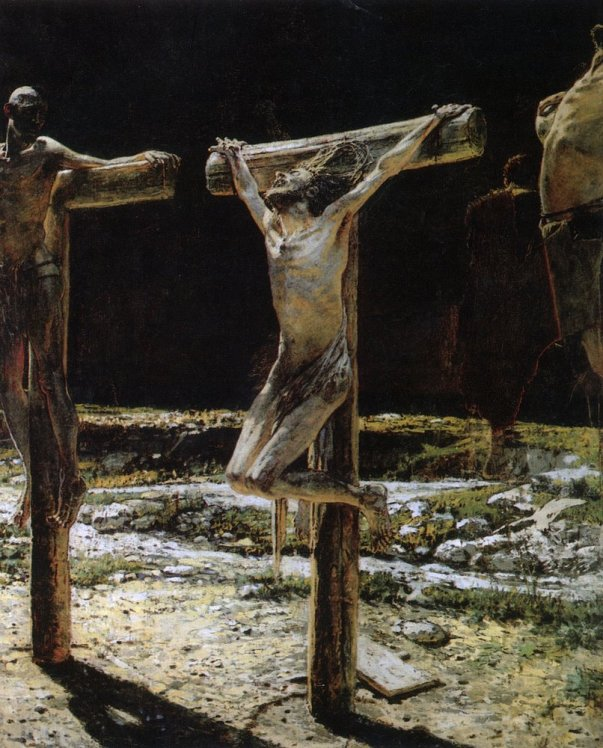
Crucifixion from 1892 from the Musée d'Orsay

The online edition of the All-Russia State Television and Radio Broadcasting Company, known as Smotrim, published a detailed online message on its platform. The message, entitled 'Tretyakovka experts confirmed the authenticity of the painting "Crucifixus"', contains video footage (broadcast in 2011 on the Russian federal television channel, Russia-24), and a text recording of the final meeting of the expert commission in the Academic Council Hall of the State Tretyakov Gallery, at which Lidia Gladkova acted as the "prosecutor" and Tatiana Karpova as the "lawyer", as well as footage of experts examining the painting.

The author of the article in Our Time, the journalist Marina Kaminskaya, formulated two main versions of the painting's appearance based on the opinions of researchers. According to the first ("from one of our Don artists I heard... an assumption..."), Crucifixus is one of the original versions of the widely known Crucifixion of 1892. Kaminskaya herself does not share this point of view: in the 1892 version and in other paintings of the Passion Cycle "[there is] a completely different vision of the image of the Saviour. Other feelings and emotions... There are no social connotations and the audacity of the author's interpretation. Only the sorrow and grief of the Gospel." According to another version, Ge painted Crucifixus for a Catholic church. This version is supported by the proportions of the painting, which is written to be viewed from the bottom of the canvas upwards, and by a fact from the artist's own biography: Nikolai Ge submitted his sketches to the competition for the painting of the Cathedral of Christ the Saviour, but the commission rejected them. The journalist herself assumed that the artist intended the painting for one of the Catholic churches in Ukraine, as "from the age of 45, Nicholas Ge lived and worked on an estate in Chernihivshchyna."

In May 2020, the Museum of Don Cossacks produced a video programme dedicated to the painting by Nikolai Ge, which was subsequently uploaded to the museum's YouTube channel. The programme was presented by Evgeniya Sitlivaya, a researcher at the museum.

== Bibliography ==
Scientific and popular science literature

- Karpova, T.L.; Gladkova, L.I.; Rustamova, I.V.; Sitlivaya, E.V. (2014). "«Raspyatiye» Nikolaya Ge iz Novocherkasska" «Распятие» Николая Ге из Новочеркасска [Nikolai Ge's "Crucifixus" by from Novocherkassk]. Nikolai Ge. Vector of Destiny and Creativity. Materials of the International Scientific Conference (Compendium) (in Russian): 142–152.
- Karpova, T.L.; Gladkova, L.I. (2012). "«Raspyatiye» Nikolaya Ge iz Novocherkasska" «Распятие» Николая Ге из Новочеркасска [Nikolai Ge's "Crucifixus" from Novocherkassk]. Russkoye Iskusstvo (in Russian). 1 (33): 44–49. ISSN 1729-9063.
- Korotkova, Z. (April 2012). "Nikolay Ge. Yeshchyo odno polotno" Николай Ге. Ещё одно полотно [Nicholas Ge. Another canvas]. Nauka i Zhizn (in Russian) (4): 104–105. ISSN 0028-1263.

Mass media

- Bolotova, O. (2012-03-22). "«Raspyatiye» Nikolaya Ge obnaruzhili v Novocherkasske. V zakromakh Novocherkasskogo muzeya istorii donskogo kazachestva «naydeno» unikalnoye polotno" «Распятие» Николая Ге обнаружили в Новочеркасске. В закромах Новочеркасского музея истории донского казачества «найдено» уникальное полотно ["Crucifixus" by Nikolai Ge found in Novocherkassk. A unique canvas was "found" in the hoards of the Novocherkassk Museum of the History of the Don Cossacks]. Moskovsky Komsomolets (in Russian). ISSN 1562-1987.
- Brovkina, M. (2011-12-22). "Podtverzhdena podlinnost polotna Nikolaya Ge «Raspyatiye»" Подтверждена подлинность полотна Николая Ге «Распятие» [The authenticity of Nikolai Ge's painting "Crucifixus" has been confirmed]. Rossiyskaya gazeta (in Russian). ISSN 1606-5484.
- "V Novocherkasske eksperty iz Tretyakovskoy galerei vyyasnyayut podlinnost kartiny Nikolaya Ge" В Новочеркасске эксперты из Третьяковской галереи выясняют подлинность картины Николая Ге [In Novocherkassk, experts from the Tretyakov Gallery find out the authenticity of Nikolai Ge's painting]. Komsomolskaya Pravda (in Russian). 2011-10-30. ISSN 0233-433X.
- Golovko, V. (2012-02-03). "V Rostove vpervye vystavyat «Raspyatiye» Nikolaya Ge" В Ростове впервые выставят «Распятие» Николая Ге [Nikolai Ge's "Crucifixus" will be exhibited for the first time in Rostov]. Argumenty i Fakty (in Russian). ISSN 0204-0476.
- Kaminskaya, M. (2012-12-02). "Svet Yevangeliya" Свет Евангелия [Gospel light]. Nashe Vremya (in Russian).

Guidebooks

- Muzey istorii donskogo kazachestva: Putevoditel Музей истории донского казачества: Путеводитель [Museum of the History of the Don Cossacks: Guidebook] (in Russian). Rostov-on-Don: Knizhnoye izdatelstvo. 1978.
- Putevoditel. Muzey istorii donskogo kazachestva (Novocherkassk) Путеводитель. Музей истории донского казачества (Новочеркасск) [A Guidebook. Museum of the History of the Don Cossacks (Novocherkassk)] (in Russian). Rostov-on-Don: Knizhnoye izdatelstvo. 1969.
