= Nikolai Ge =

Russian painter (1831–1894)

- Николай Ге
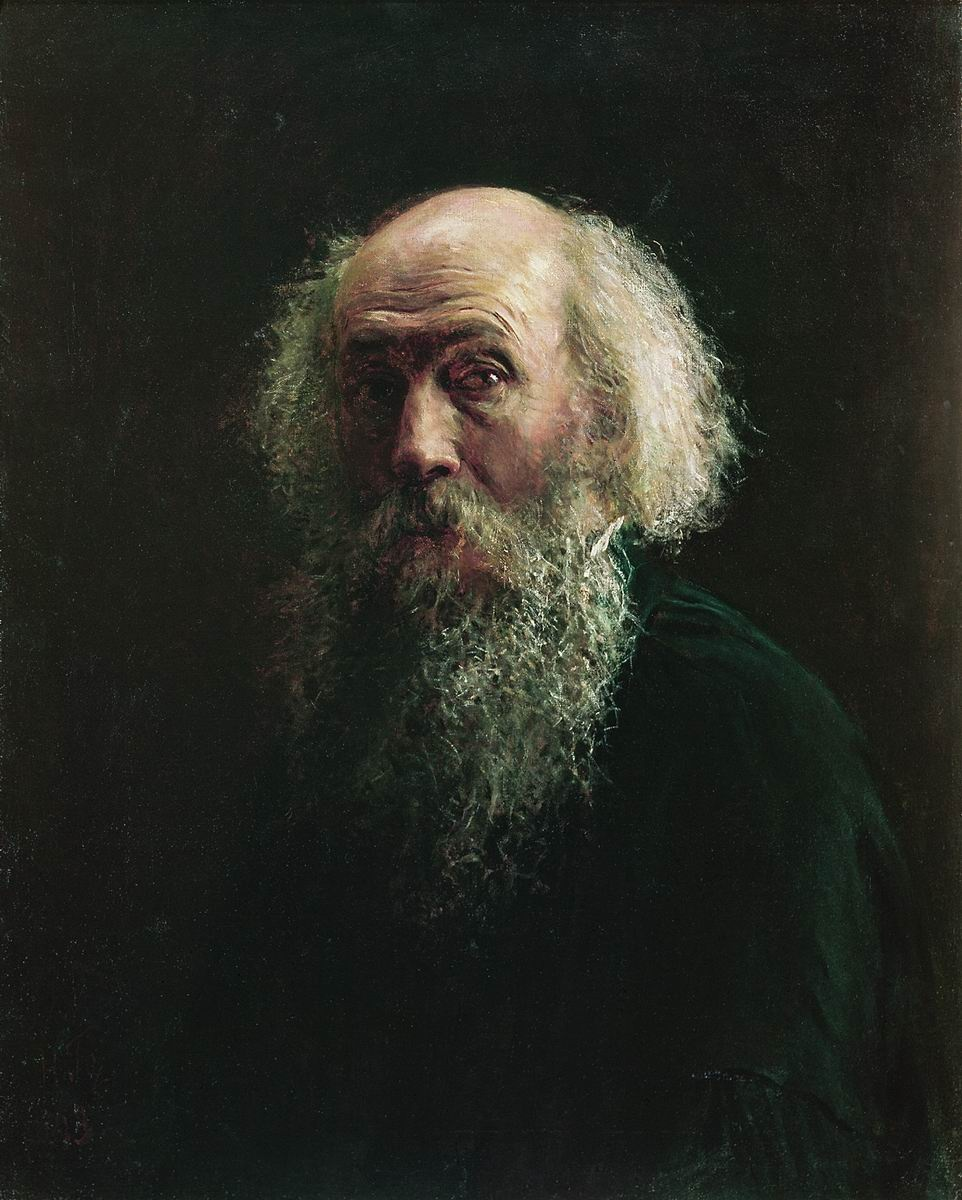
- Self-portrait, 1892
- Born: 27 February [O.S. 15 February] 1831; Voronezh, Russian Empire
- Died: 13 June [O.S. 1 June] 1894 (aged 63); Ivanovsky farm, Chernigov Governorate, Russian Empire
- Education: No. 1 Gymnasium
- Known for: Painting
- Style: Symbolism, history painting
- Movement: Russian symbolism Peredvizhniki
- Awards: Big Gold Medal of the Imperial Academy of Arts (1857)

Nikolai Nikolaevich Ge (Russian: Николай Николаевич Ге; 27 February [O.S. 15 February] 1831 – 13 June [O.S. 1 June] 1894) was a Russian painter who was influential in the development of Russian symbolism. He was famous for his works on historical and religious subjects.

== Early life ==
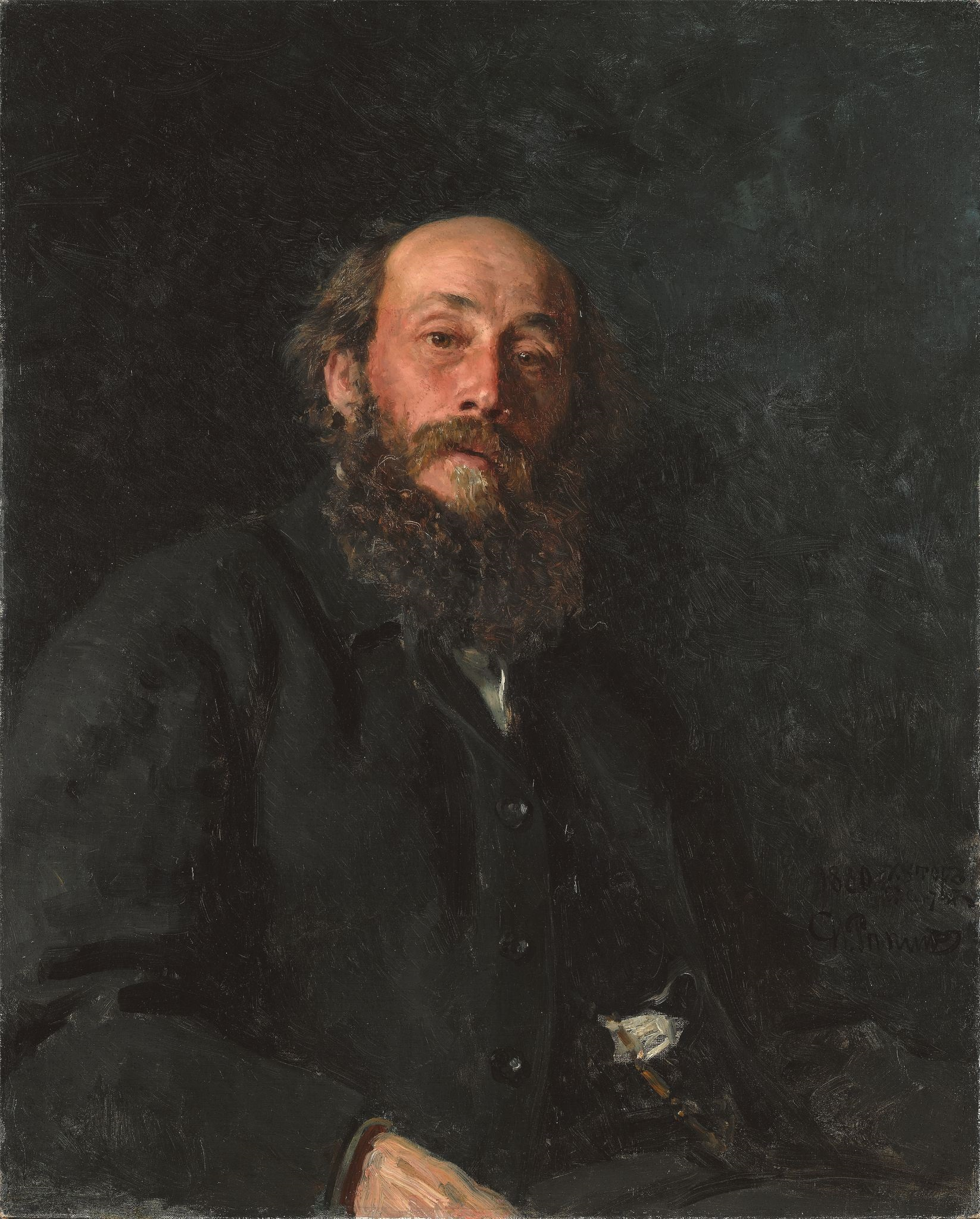
Portrait of Nikolai Ge by Ilya Repin (1880)

Nikolai Nikolaevich Ge was born on 27 February [O.S. 15 February] 1831 in Voronezh, Russia, to a family in the Russian nobility. His great-grandfather, who was a French nobleman, immigrated to Russia during the 18th century and married a Russian woman. The original French spelling of the surname was Gay, and many French sources use this spelling rather than the Russian transliteration. Ge's mother died of cholera when he was three months old.

Ge grew up on a family estate in Popelukhy near Mogilev-Podolskiy in the region of Podolia. His grandmother and a serf nurse cared for him. He graduated from the No. 1 Gymnasium in Kiev where Mykola Kostomarov was one of his teachers. Then he studied physics and mathematics at Kiev University and Saint Petersburg University.

== Career ==
In 1850, Ge gave up his career in science and enrolled in the Imperial Academy of Arts in Saint Petersburg. He studied under master painter Pyotr Basin. In 1857, he graduated from the Academy where he received a gold medal for The Witch of Endor Invoking the Spirit of the Prophet Samuel. The influence of Karl Bryullov on his early works is noticeable. The gold medal secured a scholarship for Ge to study abroad. He visited Germany, Switzerland and France. From 1857 to 1859, he lived in Rome, where he met Alexander Andreyevich Ivanov, and from 1860 to 1869, he lived in Florence.

In Italy, he turned to subjects from ancient Roman history. The work of Ivanov also influenced Ge and inspired him to create paintings on Gospel themes. In 1861, Ge painted The Last Supper using a photograph of Aleksandr Ivanovich Herzen as an image for his central figure of Christ. The photograph was taken by Herzen's cousin, Russian photographer Sergei Lvovich Levitsky. This was the first known occasion where photography was used as the main source for a central character in a painting and speaks to the deep influences that photography would have later on in art and artistic movements like French Impressionism. The painting, first purchased by Emperor Alexander II of Russia, made such a strong impression when it was shown in Saint Petersburg in 1863 that Ge was made a professor of the Imperial Academy of Arts. In 1864, Ge painted Herzen's portrait along with the Messengers of the Resurrection and the first version of Christ on the Mount of Olives. The new paintings were not much of a success and the Imperial Academy refused to exhibit them in its annual exhibition.

In 1870, Ge again returned to Saint Petersburg where he turned to Russian history for subject matter. He was one of the founders of the Society of Traveling Art Exhibitions (Peredvizhniki). The painting Peter the Great Interrogates Tsarevich Alexey at Peterhof (1871) was a great success, but his next works did not satisfy him and he stopped painting for several years. In 1876, he bought a small khutor (farm) in Chernigov Governorate (present-day Ukraine), known as Ivanovsky, and moved there. There he took up agricultural and social activities, such as helping peasants. Ge's way of thinking was close to Leo Tolstoy and in 1882, he became acquainted with him. He soon returned to religious subjects and portraits. He claimed that everyone had the right to have a personal portrait and agreed to work for whatever commission the subject could afford. Among his later portrait subjects were Tolstoy, Mikhail Saltykov-Shchedrin and the biblical Judas.

His later paintings on New Testament subjects were praised by liberal critics like Vladimir Stasov and criticized by conservatives for illustrating Ernest Renan rather than the New Testament and were banned by authorities for blasphemy. Quid Est Veritas? Christ and Pilate (1890) was also banned from an exhibition. The Judgment of the Sanhedrin: He is Guilty! (1892) was not admitted to the annual Academy of Arts exhibition; The Calvary (Golgotha) (1893) remained unfinished; The Crucifixion (1894) was banned by Emperor Alexander III.

== Legacy ==
Ge died on his farm on 13 June [O.S. 1 June] 1894. The fate of many of his works remains a mystery. Ge had bequeathed all of his works to his Swiss benefactress, Béatrice de Vattville in exchange for a small stipend from her during his lifetime. When she died in 1952, none of Ge's works was found in her castle. His magnum opus painting The Crucifixion had already been given by his son to the Musée du Luxembourg in Paris in 1903, and is now in the Musée d'Orsay.

Ge's drawings were later discovered by art collectors in Swiss second-hand stores as late as 1974. Many "were acquired by a young collector, Christoph Bolman [...] he had no idea of their origin, simply recognizing their value. Only some 15 years later, when he was visited during the Perestroika by Soviet acquaintances, did the attribution become clear. Negotiations for their acquisition and return to Russia – as a full collection, rather than sold off in parts – failed repeatedly during the 1990s. They were only concluded in 2011 after the Tretyakov Gallery was able to arrange sponsorship from a Russian state bank to purchase them for donation to the gallery's permanent collection."

== Selected works ==
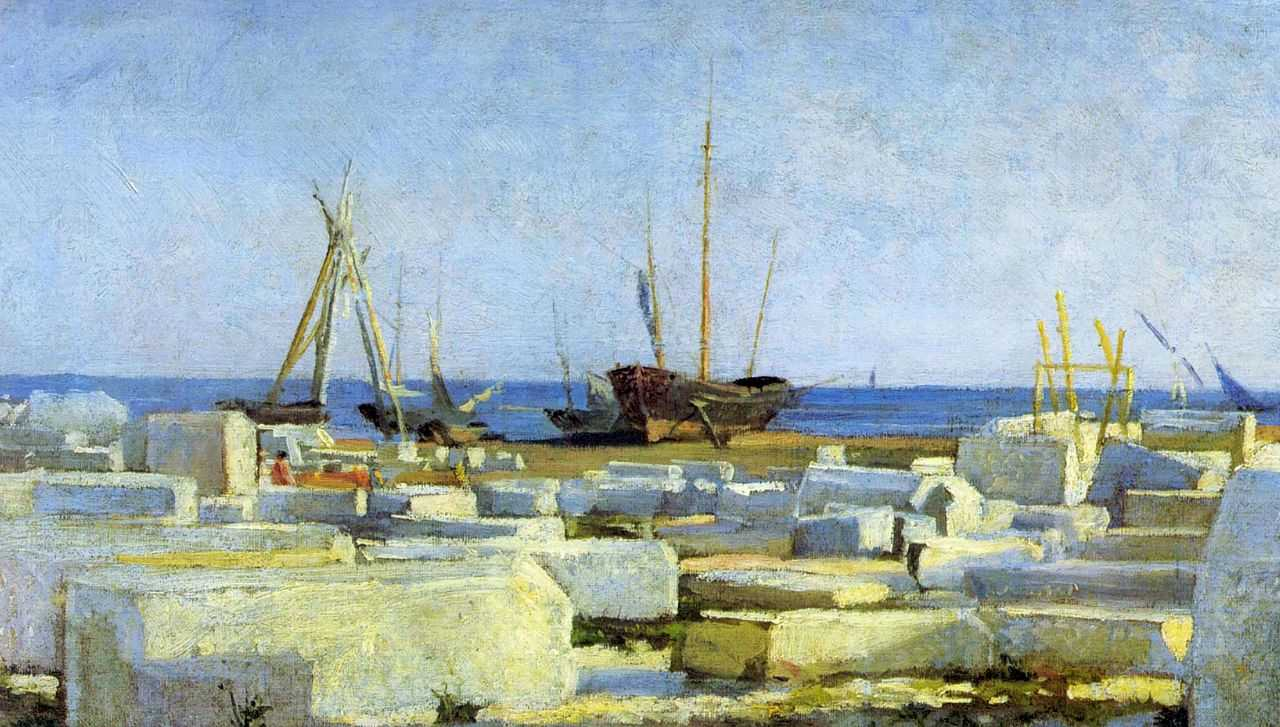
Carrara marble

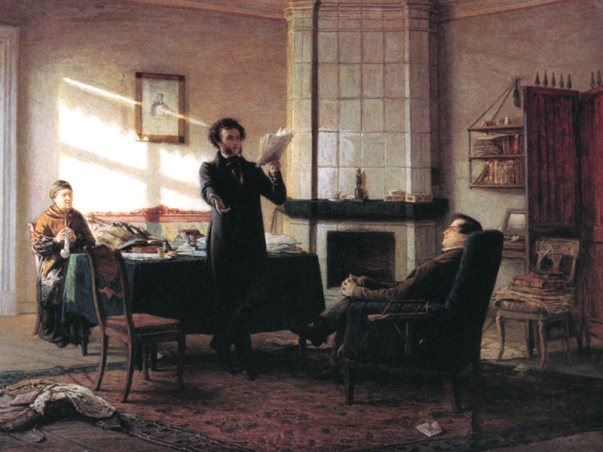
Alexander Pushkin in the village of Mikhailovsky

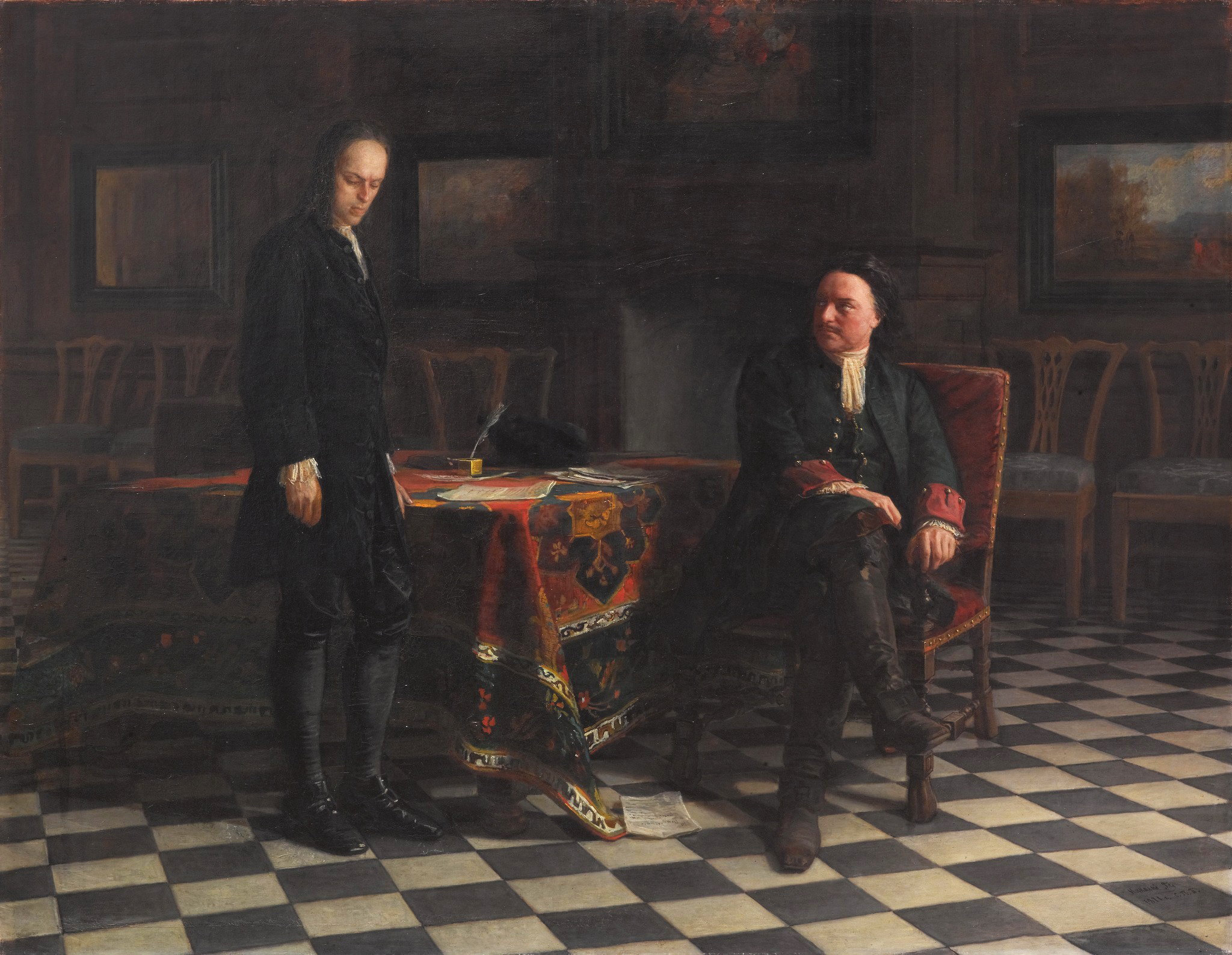
Peter the Great Interrogating the Tsarevich Alexei Petrovich at Peterhof, 1871

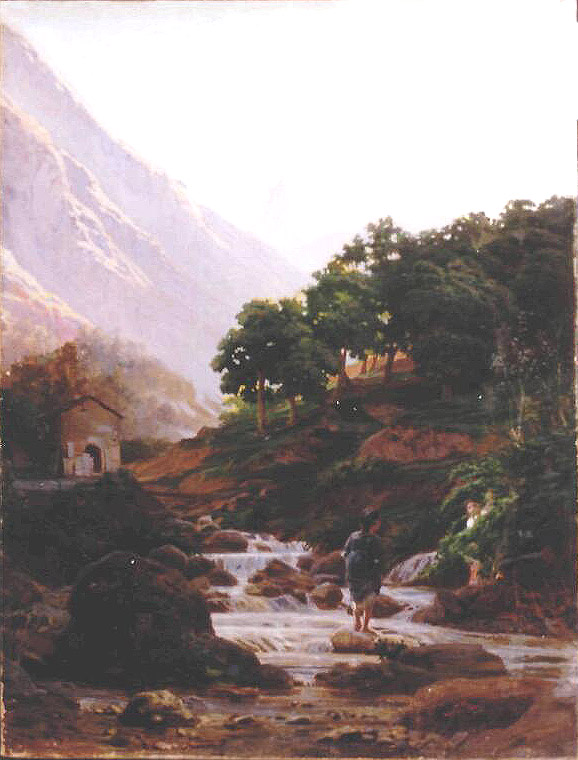
Carrara

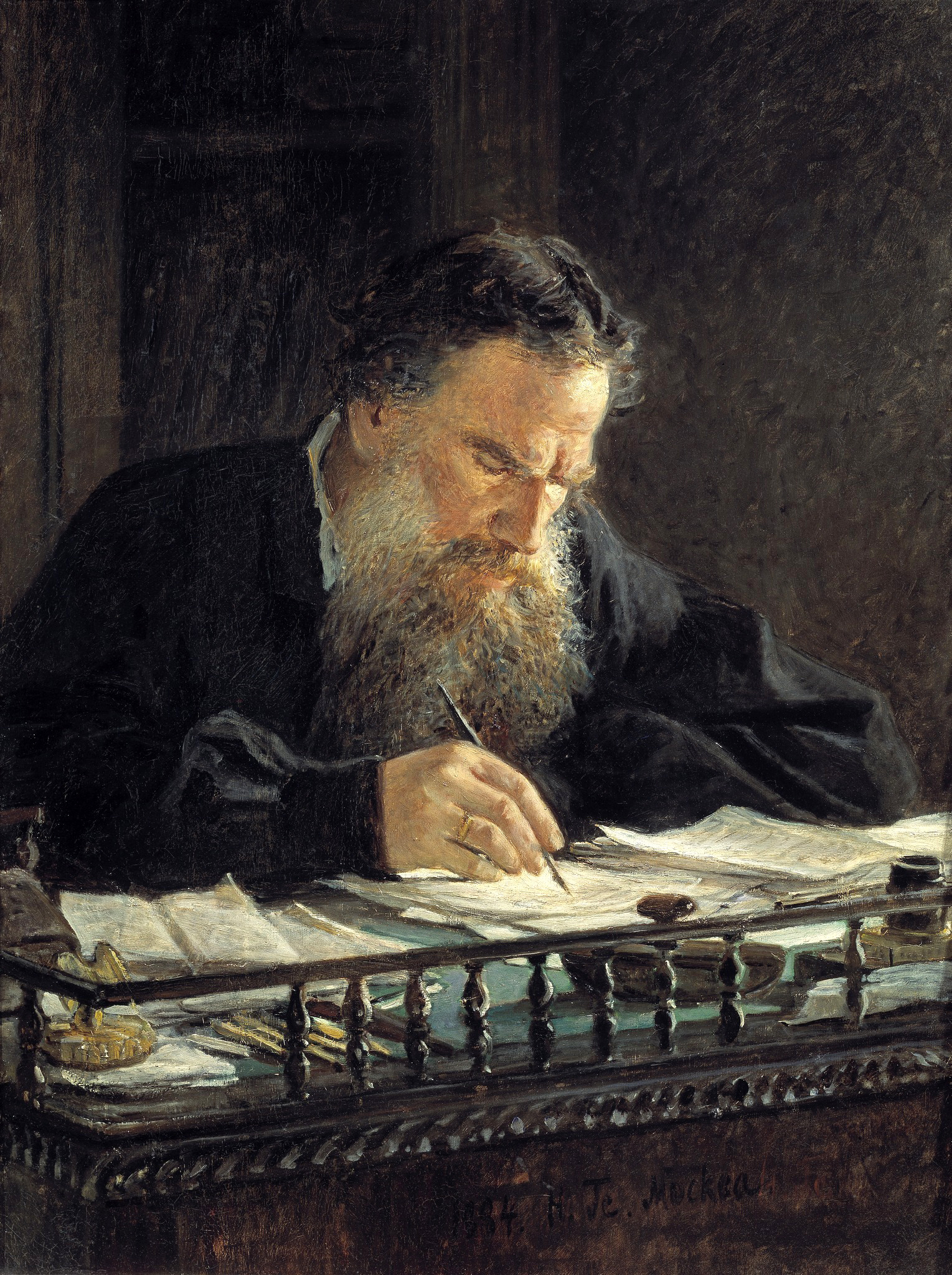
Leo Tolstoy, 1882

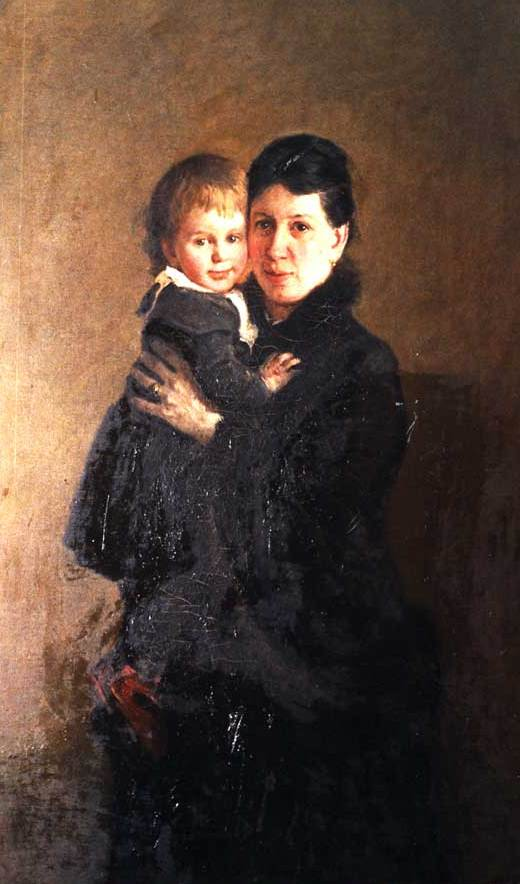
Sophia Tolstaya (wife of Leo Tolstoy)

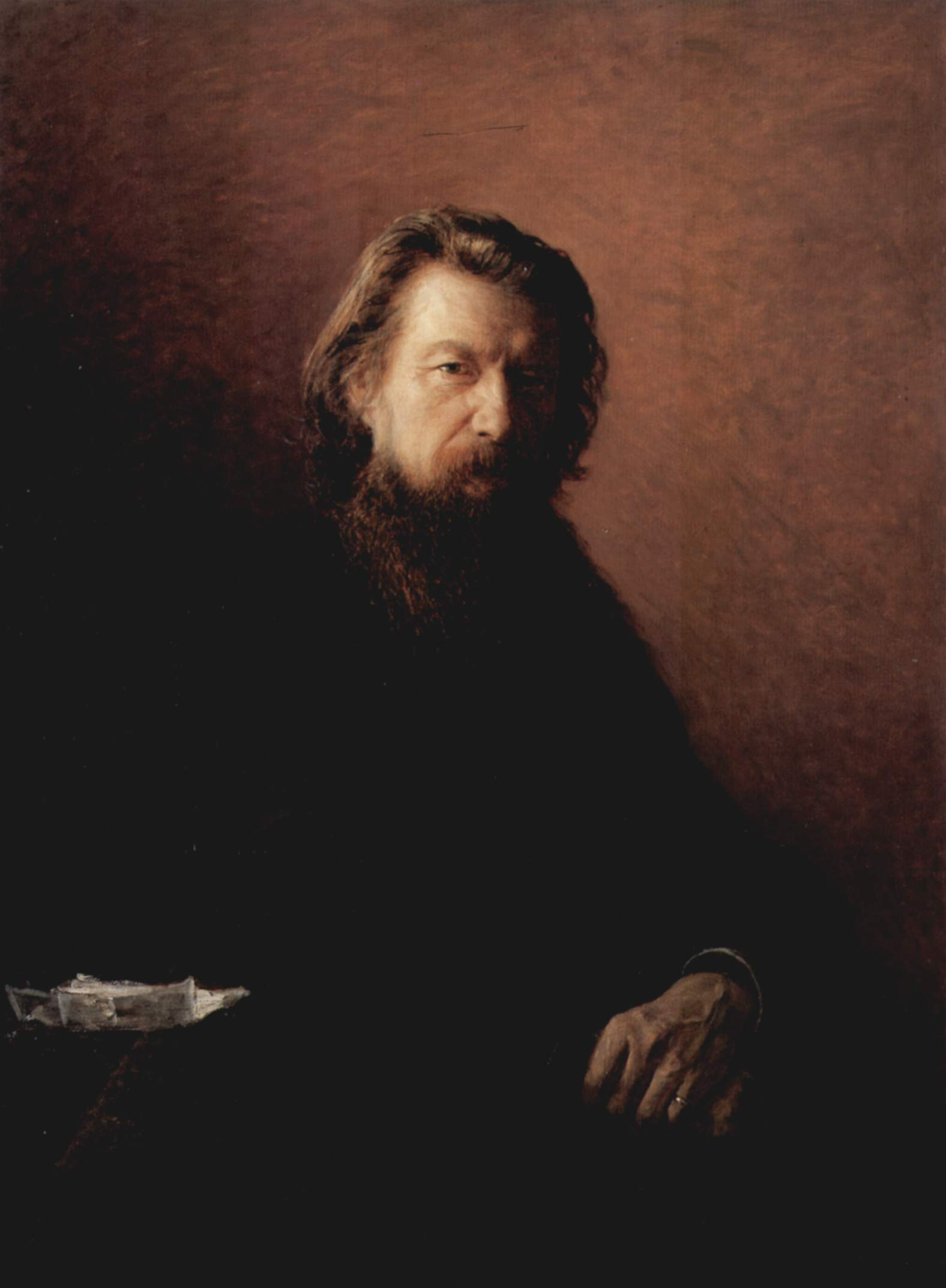
Portrait of Alexei Potechin

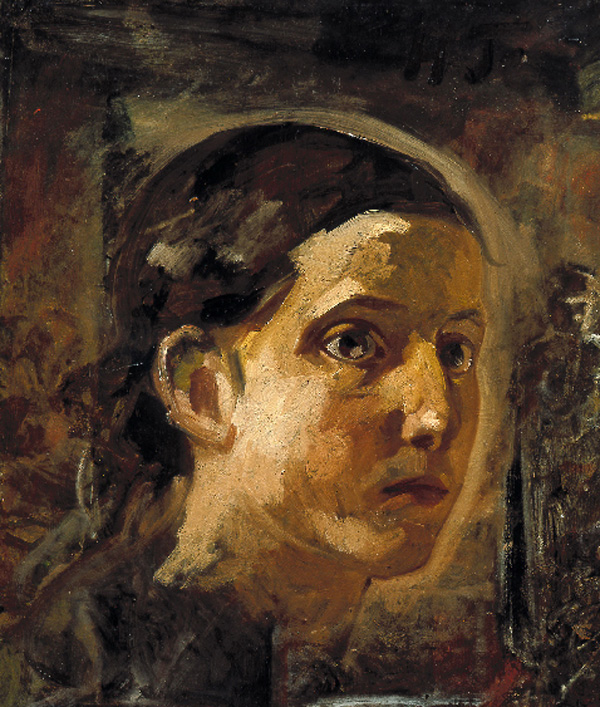
Study of John the Evangelist's head

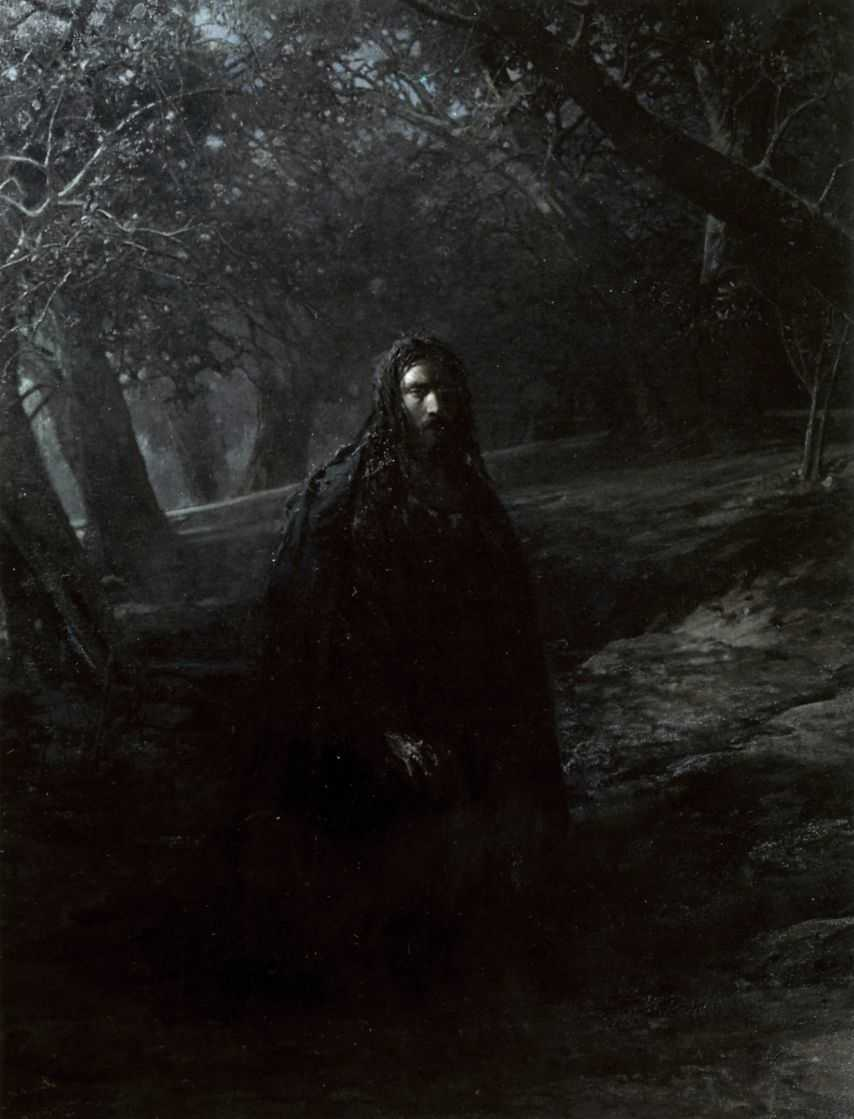
In the Garden of Gethsemane

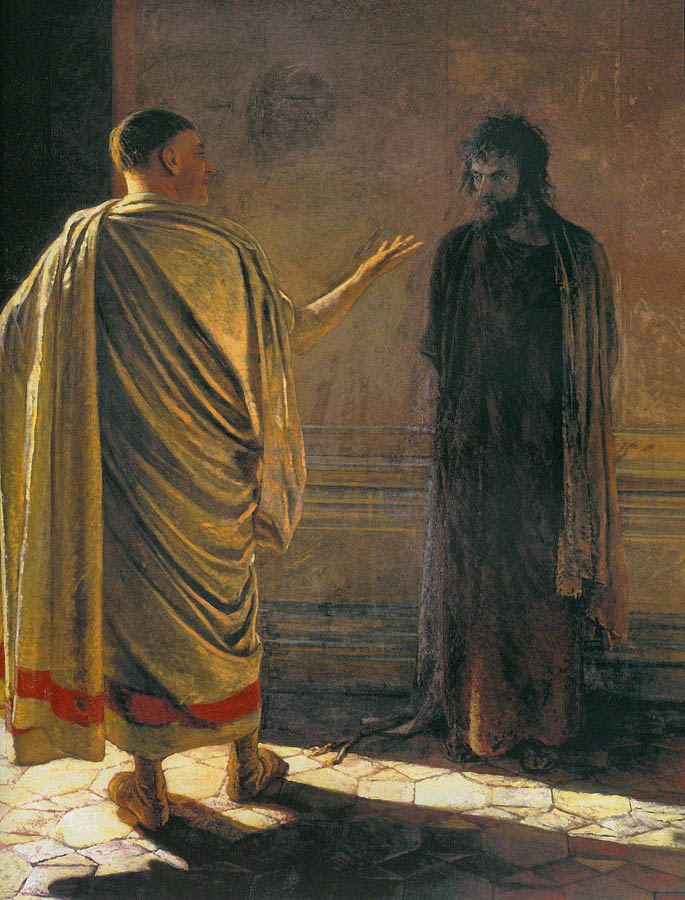
What is truth? Christ and Pilate, 1890

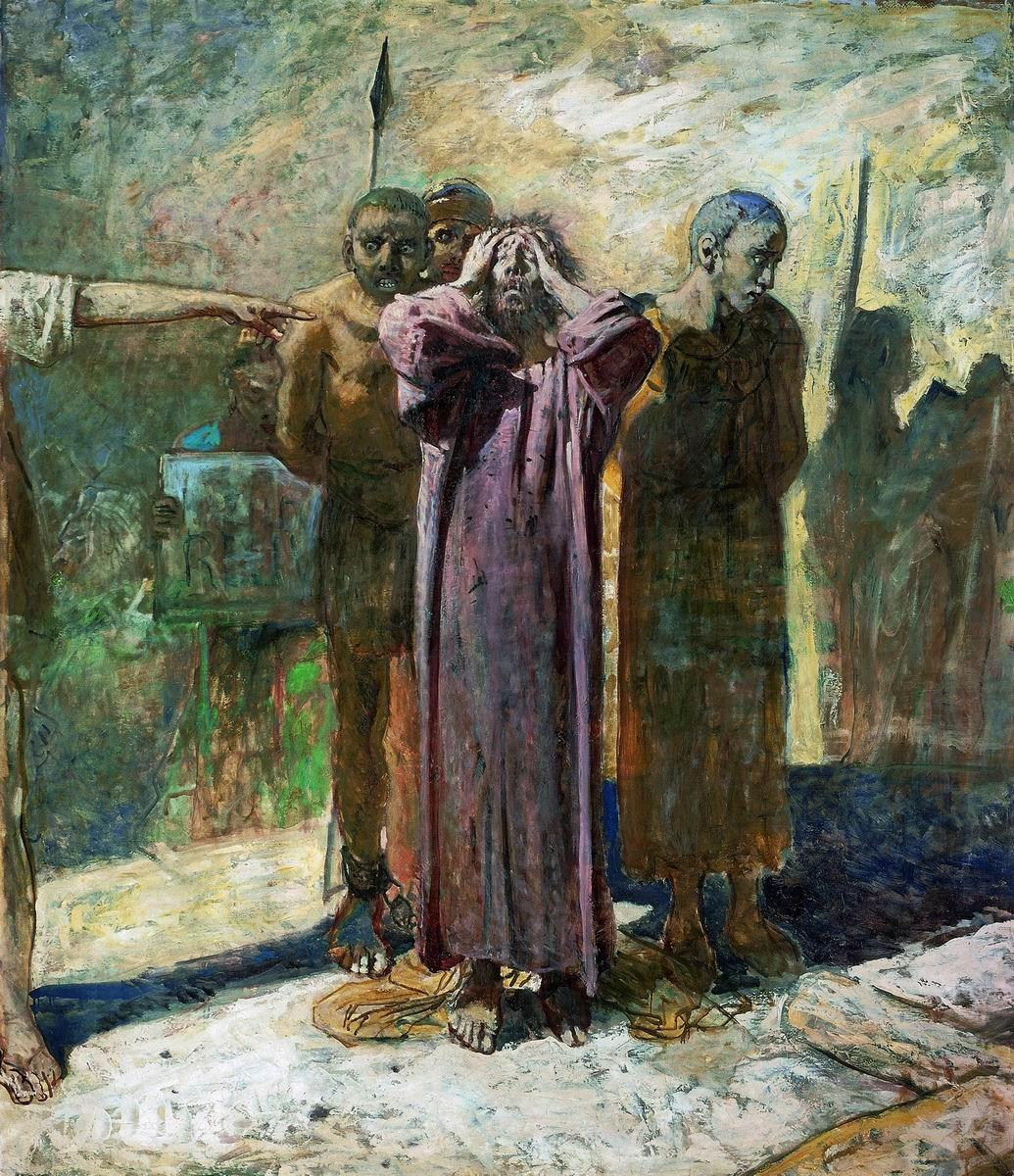
Golgotha

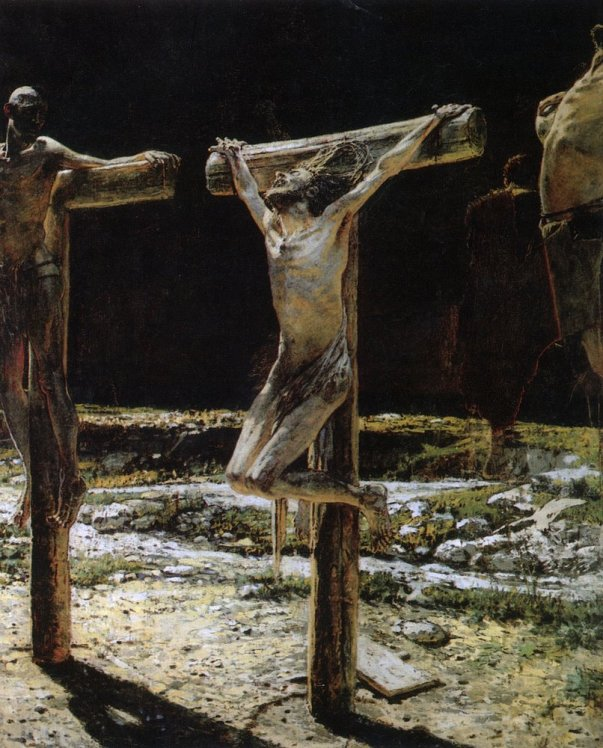
Crucifixion

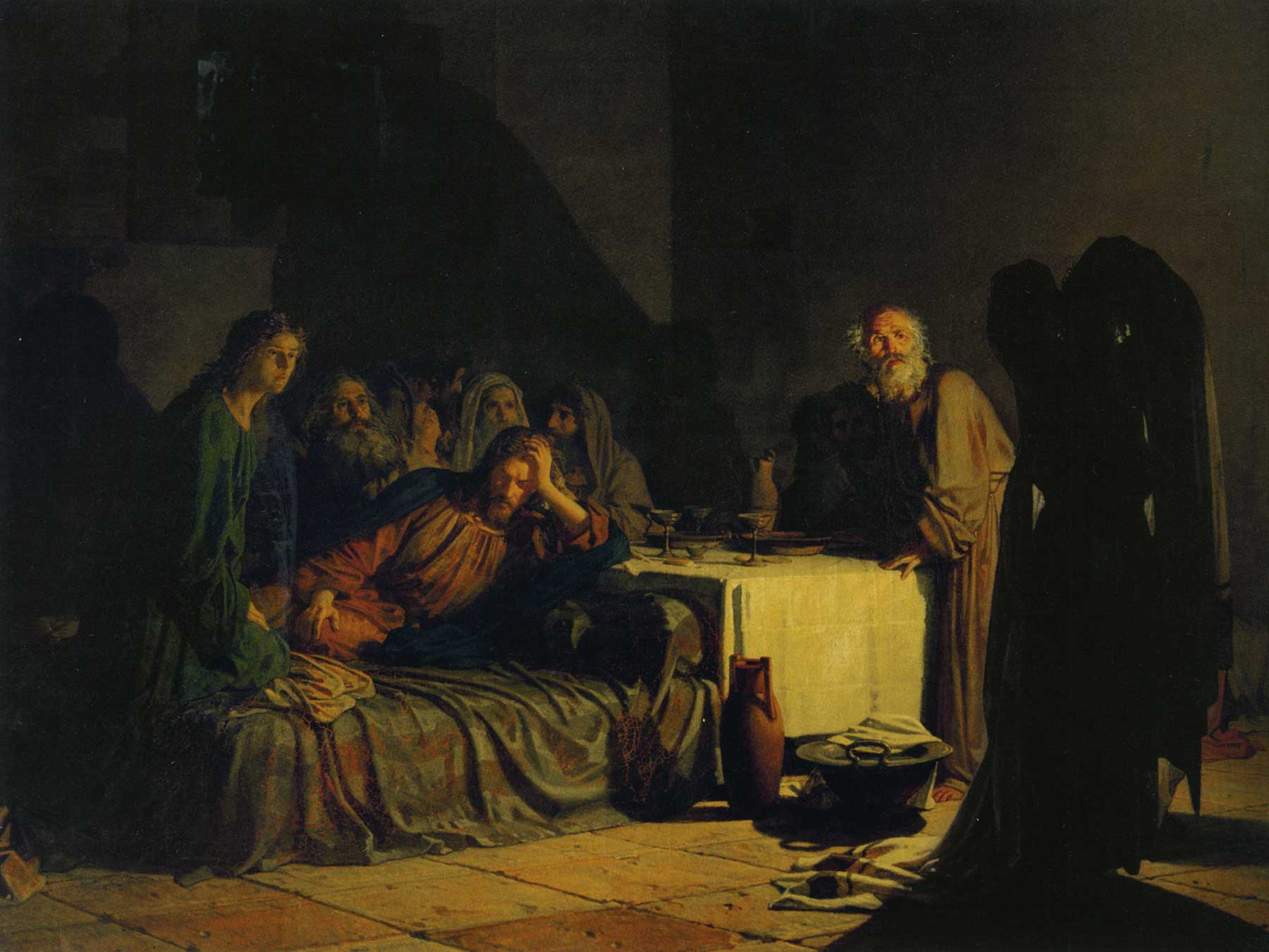
The Last Supper, 1863

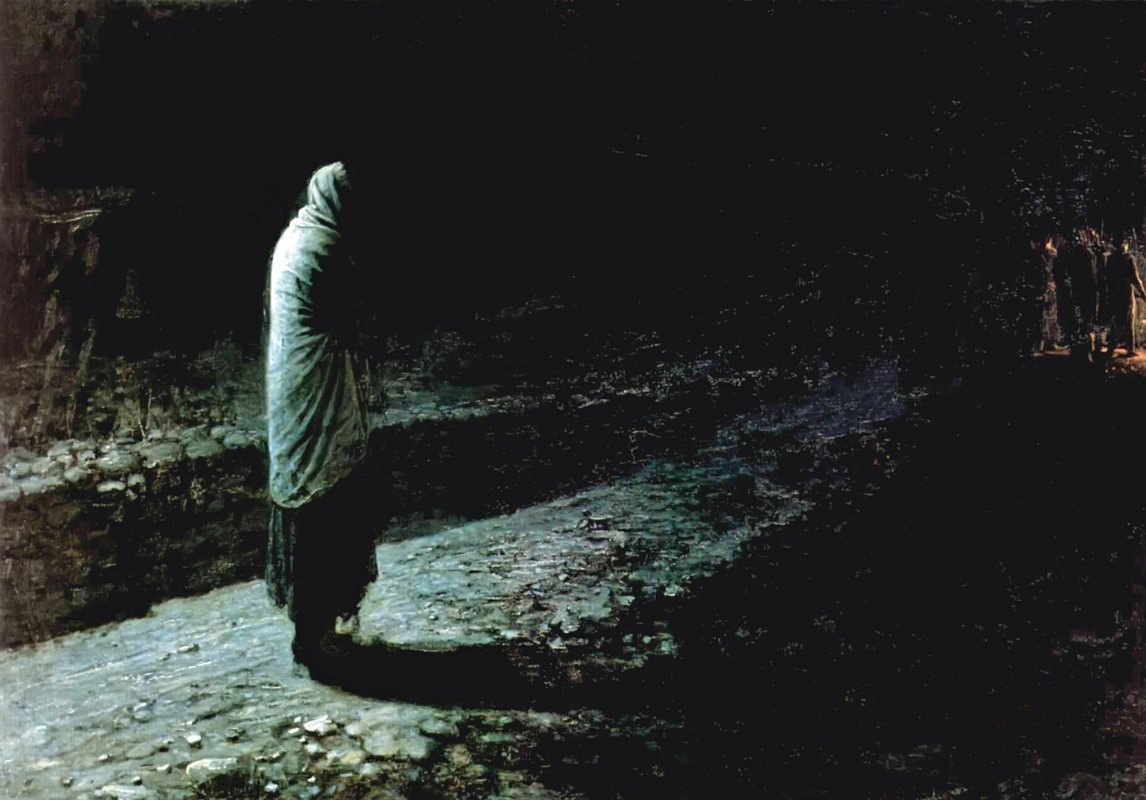
Conscience: Judas

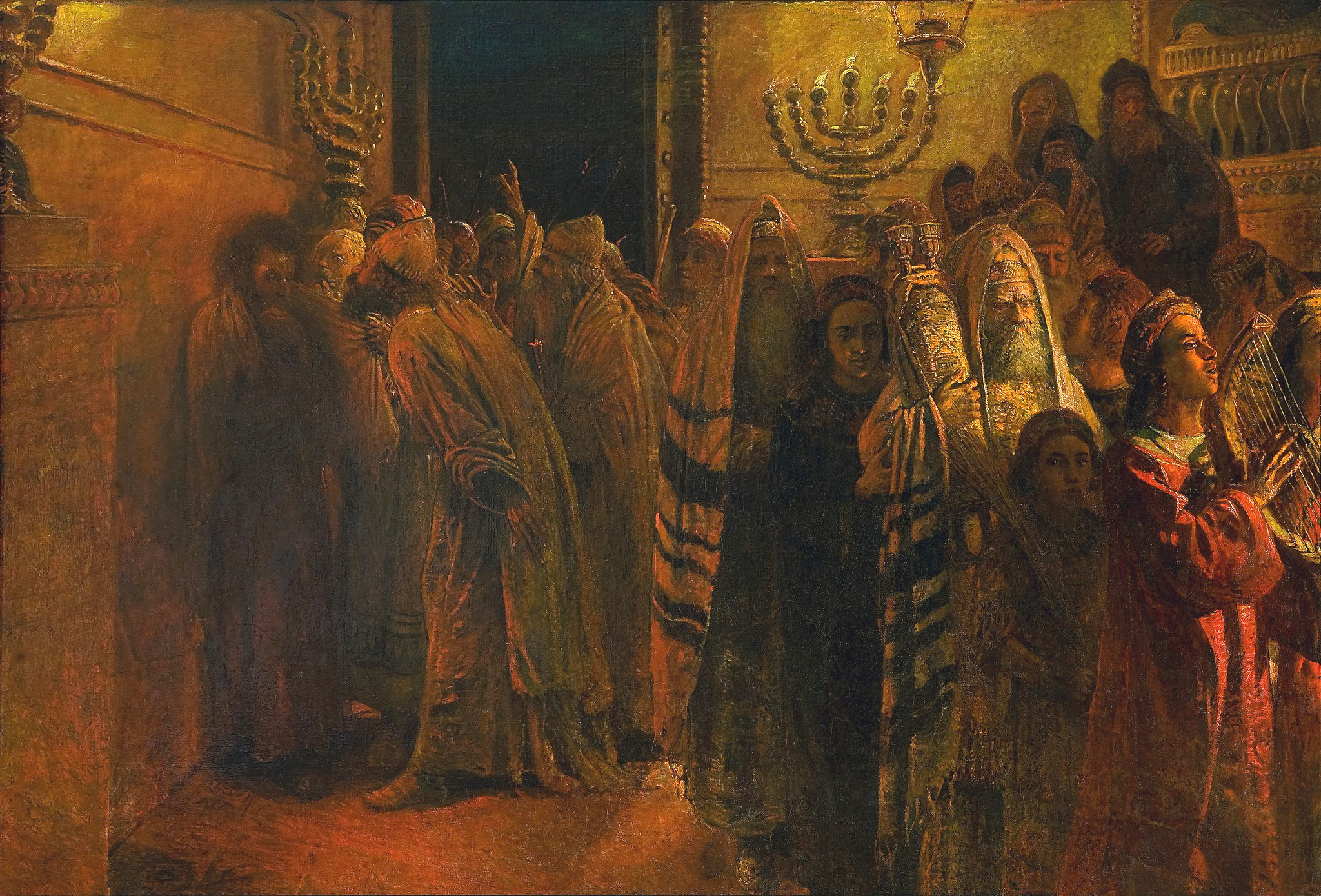
The Judgment of the Sanhedrin - He is Guilty!

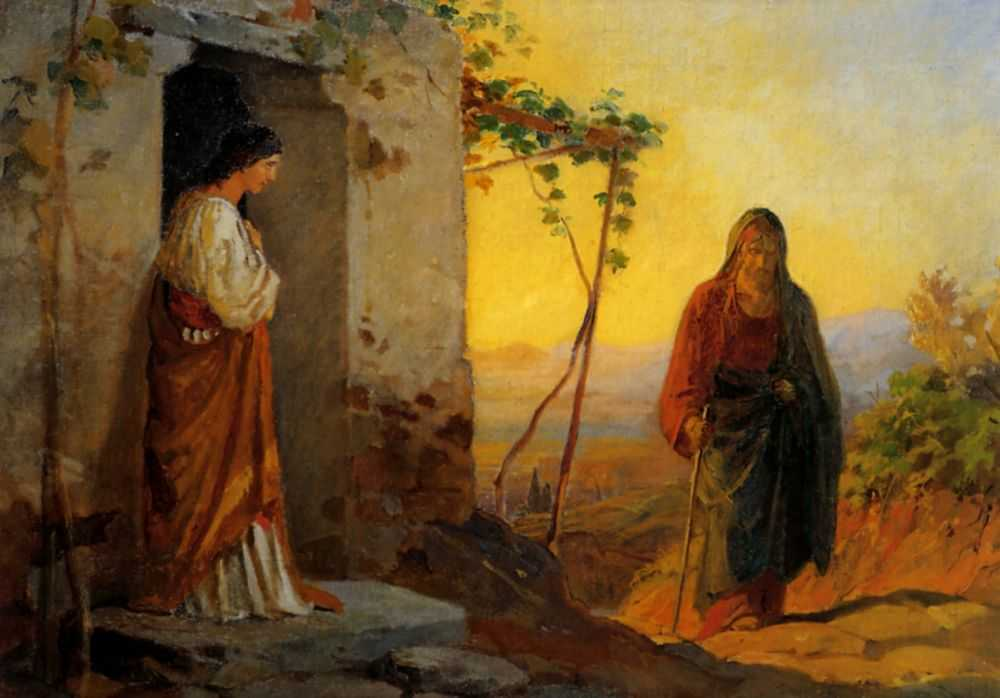
Maria, sister of Lazarus, meets Jesus who is going to their house

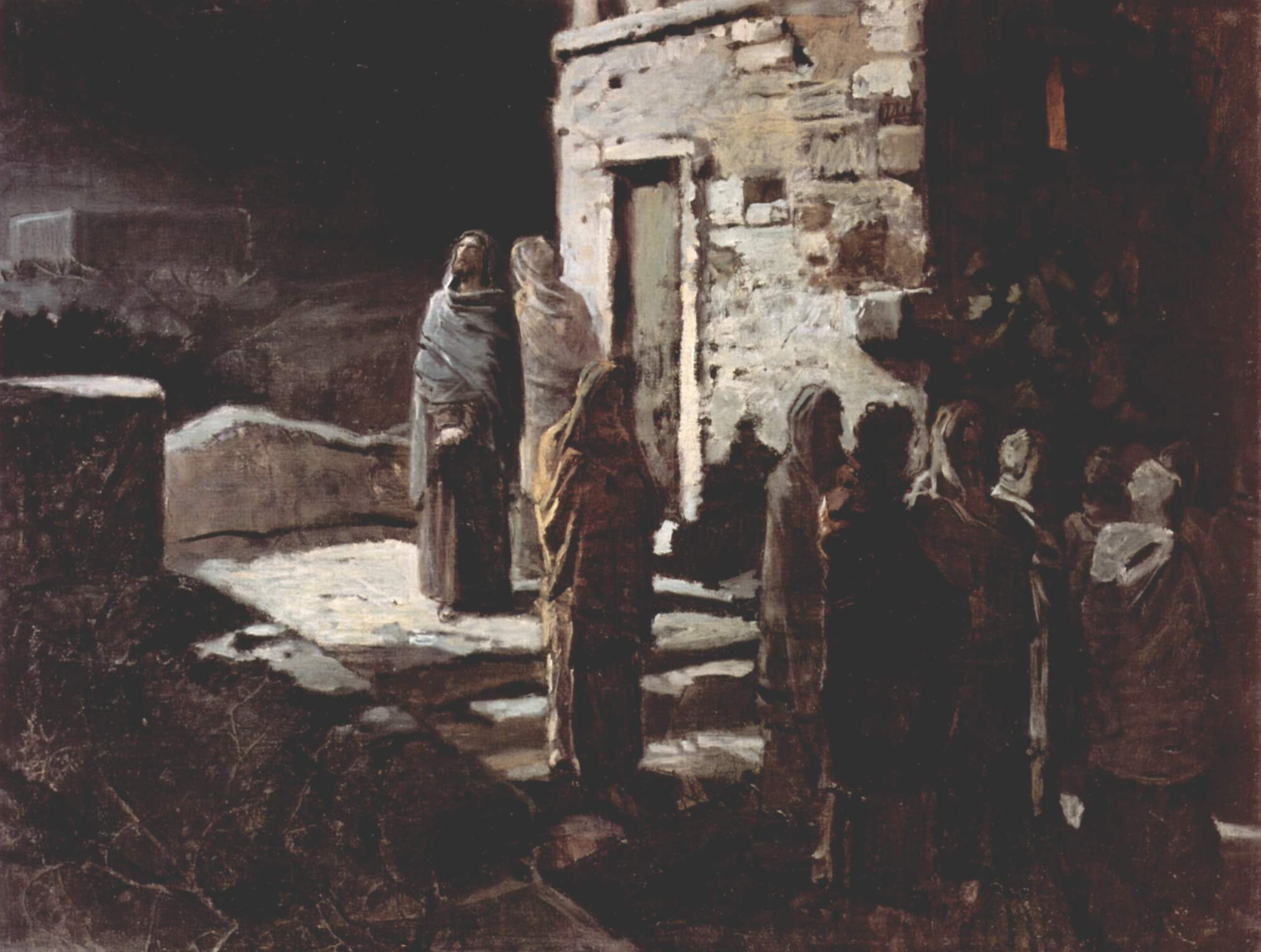
Christ praying in Gethsemane (1888)

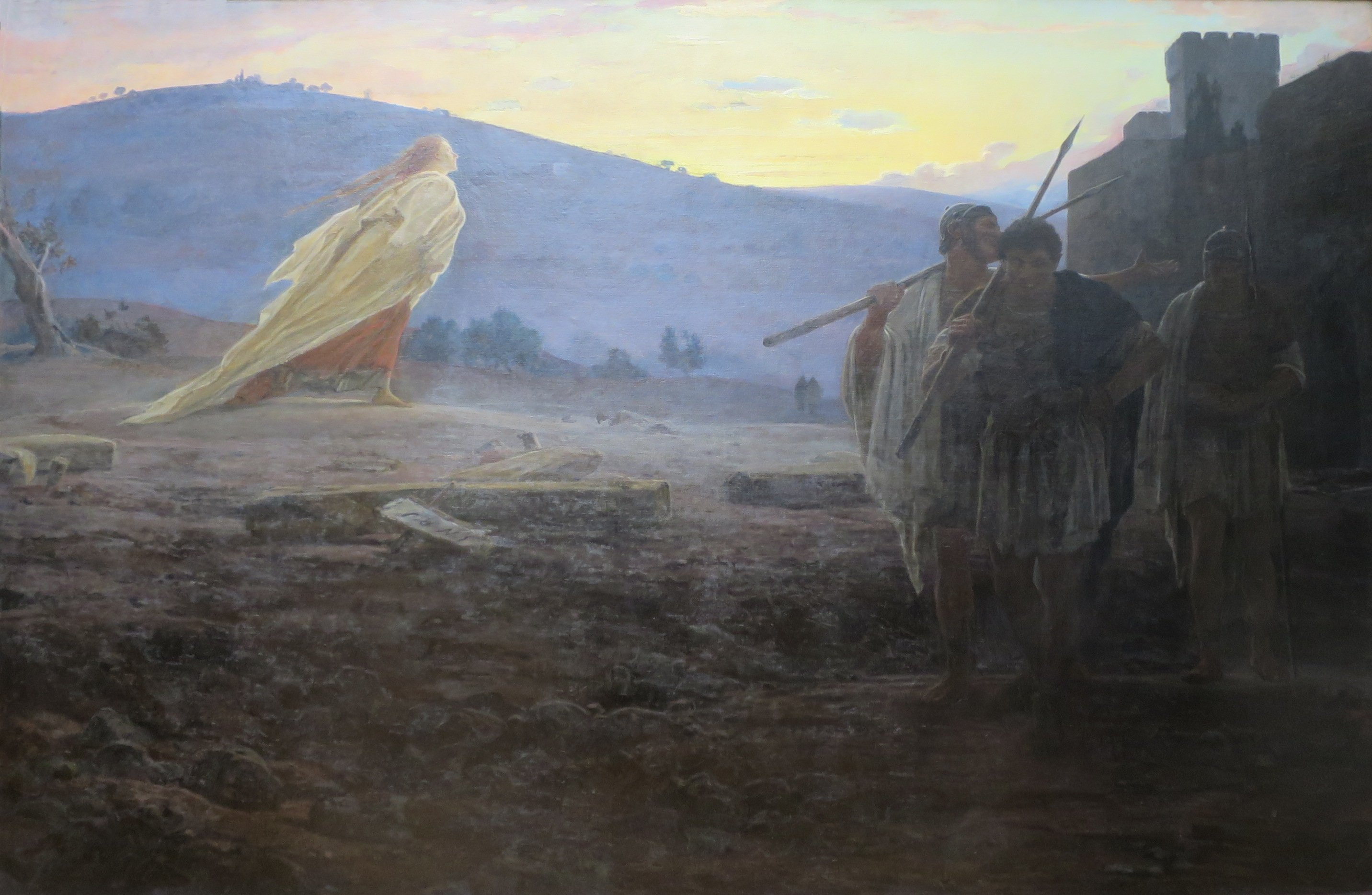
Heralds of the Resurrection

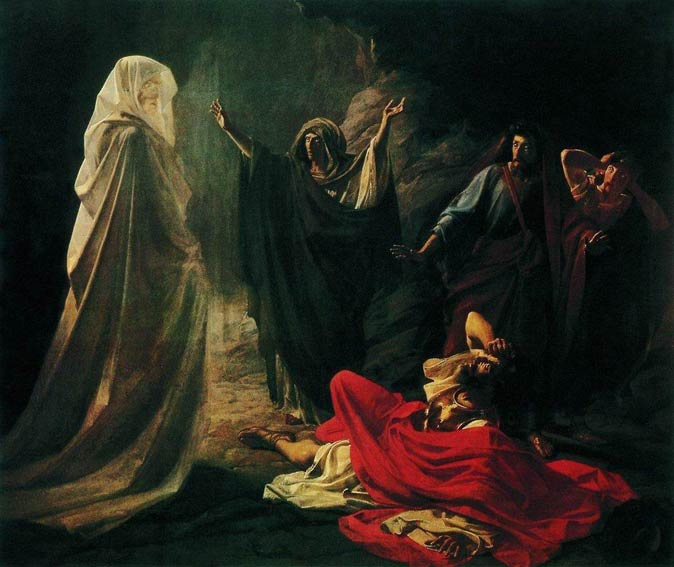
The Witch of Endor Invoking the Spirit of the Prophet Samuel, 1857

== See also ==
- List of Russian artists
- Crucifixus (Nikolay Ge)

== Sources ==
- Kondakov, S. N (1915). Юбилейный справочник Императорской Академии художеств. 1764-1914 (in Russian). Vol. 2. p. 46.
- Muratov, A. M. (2006). "Ге, Николай Николаевич". In Kravets, S. L. (ed.). Большая Российская энциклопедия. Том 6: Восьмеричный путь — Германцы (in Russian). Большая Российская энциклопедия. pp. 474–475. ISBN 5-85270-335-4.
- "Nikolai Ge: A Chronicle of the Artist's Life and Work | The Tretyakov Gallery Magazine". www.tretyakovgallerymagazine.com. 2015-07-15.
- Biography (in Russian)
