= House-Museum of Ivan Krylov =

Museum in Novocherkassk, Rostov, Russia

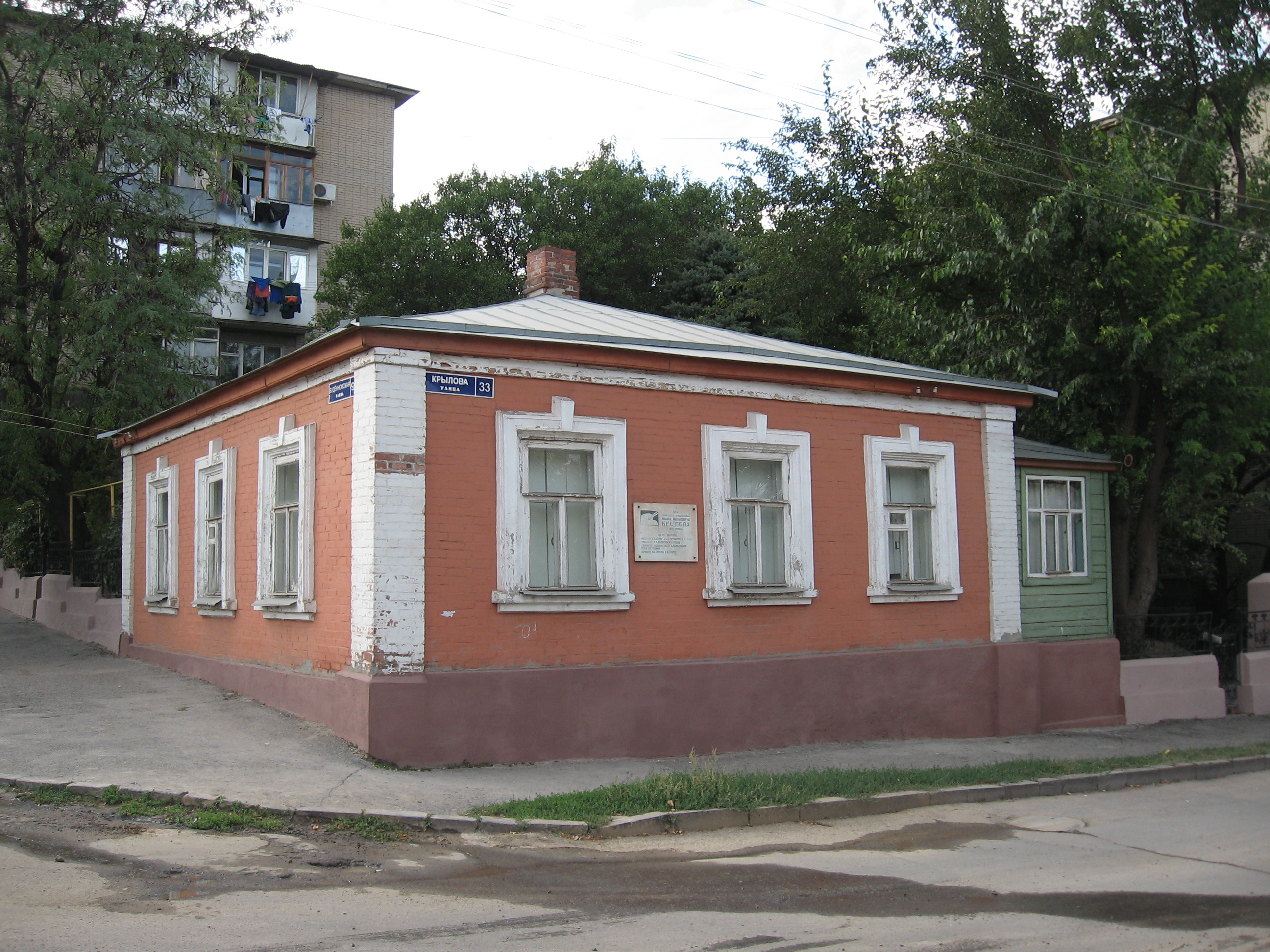

- Location within Russia
- Established: 1 June 1979
- Location: 92, Budyonnovskaya street, Novocherkassk, Rostov oblast Russia
- Coordinates: 47.425441°N 40.082209°E
- Public transit access: Ulitsa Krylova tram stop

The House-Museum of Ivan Krylov (Russian: Дом-музей Ивана Крылова) opened in 1979 in Novocherkassk, Rostov oblast, Russia and is devoted to the exhibition of the Russian and Soviet theatre painter's pieces of art, as well as to the research and study of Cossacks households. It is an affiliate of the Museum of Don Cossacks. An historic building of the museum is considered to be an object of cultural heritage.

== History ==
Theatre painter Ivan Ivanovich Krylov was born in Stanitsa of Yelizavetinskaya, Don Host Oblast, Russian Empire on 6 December 1860. After his education at the Military Gymnasia in Novocherkassk, Krylov enrolled at the Saint Petersburg Academy of Arts.

In the 1900s, Krylov traveled to Crimea and Caucasus and produced a series of works about Southern Russia. He then returned to Novocherkassk and settled with his wife Elizaveta Ivanovna Krylova (Burgkhard) and daughter.

Krylov's house was constructed near the second half of the 19th century. It is a typical Сossaсk dwelling-house in Novocherkassk of this period. Ivan Ivanovich hosted art exhibitions at this house. He died on 14 November 1936 and was buried at the Novocherkassk cemetery. Ivan Ivanivich bequeathed to the city near 900 his paintings. His house was center of cultural life of Novocherkassk. A lot of eminent persons of Russian and Soviet culture attended this place. Among the visitors were: Aleksandr Kuprin, Konstantin Trenyov, Alexander Serafimovich, Nikolay Dubovskoy, Mitrofan Grekov, Mikhail Erdenko, K. Dumchev, A. Listopadov and others. The opening ceremony of the house-museum of Ivan Krylov took place on 1 June 1979.

== Description ==
The house-museum consists of a wooden annex with porch, hall and four-room residential section. Seventy percent of showpieces are devoted to the Krylov's biography. Walls are decorated by his paintings, sketches and self-portrait. A rocking-chair, chess table, gramophone, mandolin, samovar, earthenware pot are exhibited in the Grekov's dwelling. Exhibitions of work of Novocherkassk painters are displayed in the exhibition hall of the museum, which is located in the Krylov's workshop.
