= Alexander Garden (Novocherkassk) =

Urban park in Novocherkassk, Russia

- Previously known as City Park of Culture and Leisure
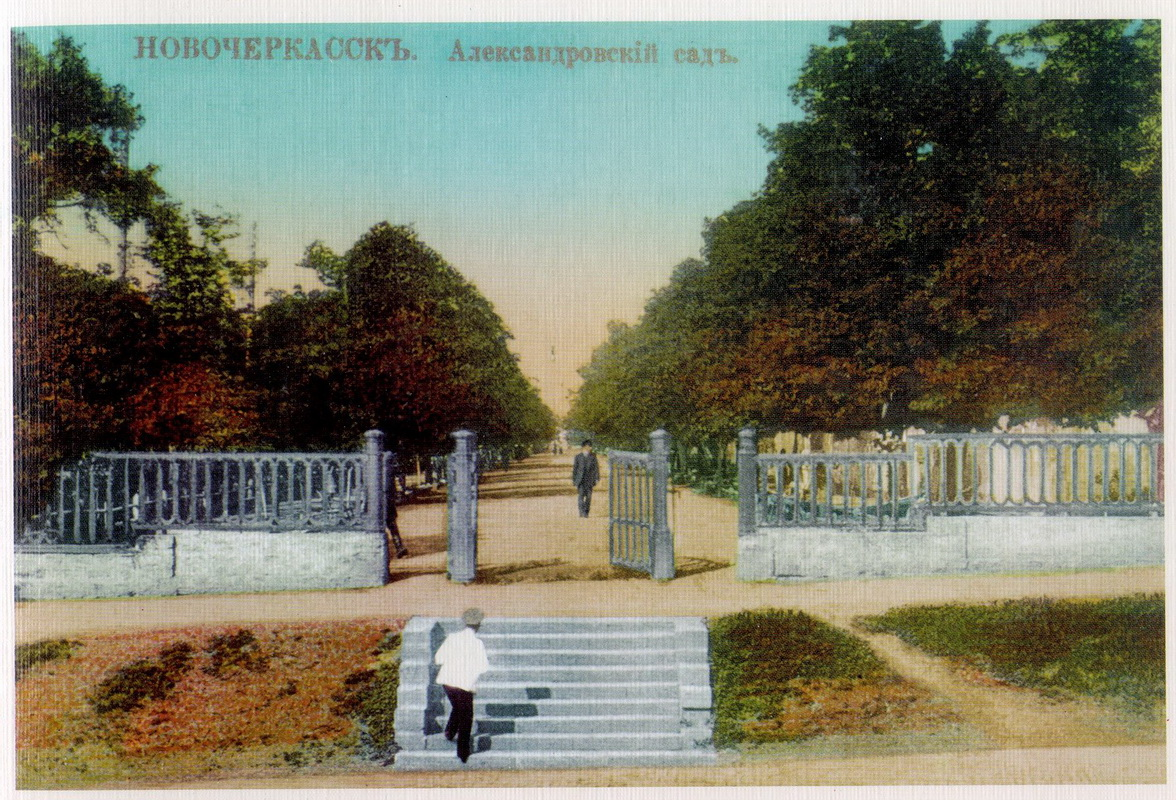
- Mainstream of the Alexander Garden on a pre-revolutionary postcard
- Interactive map of Alexander Garden
- Location: Novocherkassk, Rostov oblast Russia
- Coordinates: 47°24′31.8″N 40°06′08.4″E
- Opened: 1832
- Area: 5 hectares (12 acres)

Alexander Garden (Russian: Александровский сад, romanized: Aleksandrovsky sad) is a central urban park in Novocherkassk, Rostov oblast, Russia, named after Emperor of Russia Alexander I. It is the eldest park in the city. The park was established in 1832 on 9 ha city-owned land. It is located in the south-east of Novocherkassk between Platovsky avenue (Alexander Garden North), Aleksandrovskaya street (Alexander Garden South), Pushkinskaya (Alexander Garden West) and Atamanskaya street (Alexander Garden East).

== History ==
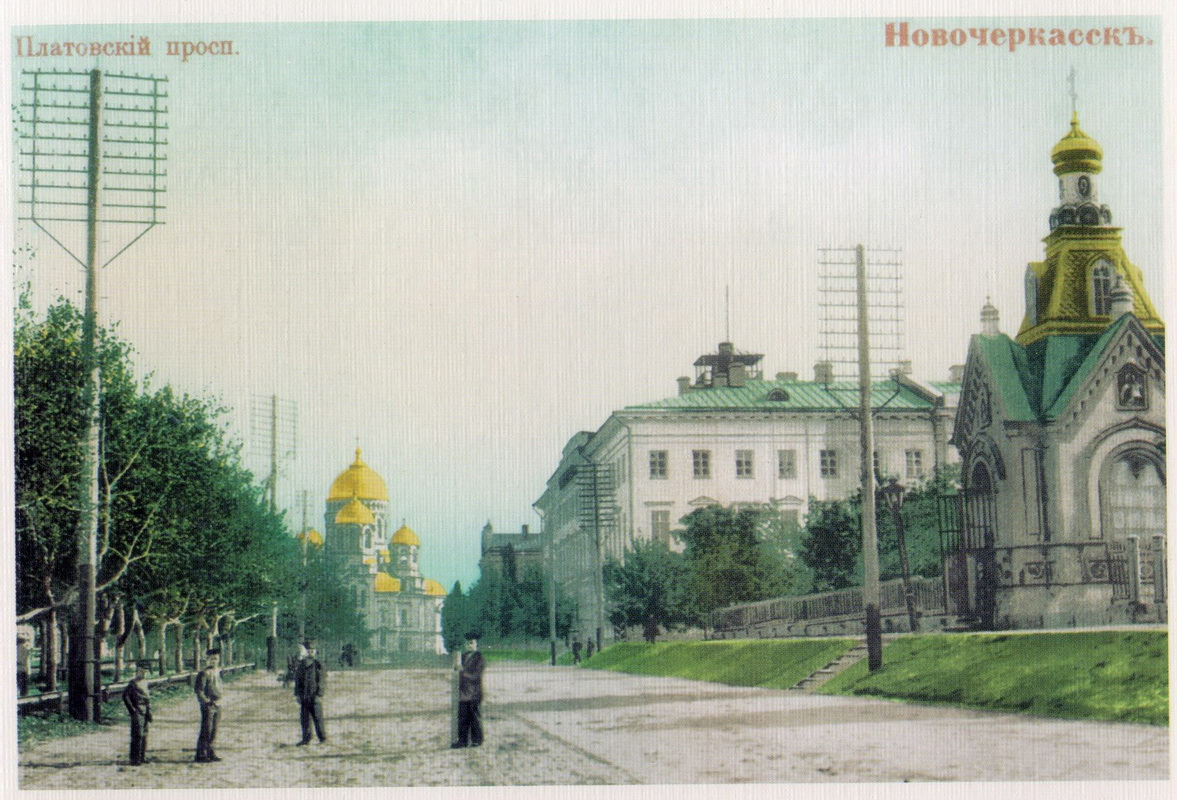
Platovsky avenue and a railing of Alexander garden (on the right) in the early 1900s

The park was established on a former Aleksndrovskaya square. The new park occupied south part of the square. Right side of the park (so-called Children's Park) has survived to this day. Visitor attractions included two barrows and stone arch. Alexander garden's viewing point on the barrow attracted visitors. It offered views of the Don steppe. The viewing point was decorated with open-work wooden arbor. The park consisted of lime tree walks with mixture of sand and sawdust. There were benches along walkways. A lot of musicians performed on a podium.

Monument to Matvey Platov was opened in 1853 alongside of the main park entrance. Platov founded Novocherkassk in 1805. The monument was the first sculpture in the city. The Ataman palace was built behind the monument in 1863. The first fountain was erected after commissioning of water pipe in Novocherkassk in 1865. Appearance of the park was complemented by a delicate iron-cast railing which was designed by architect Radionov. The grille was suspended between iron columns crowned with round bent caps. In 1881 two small chapels in a Russian Revival style was built over the gate overlooking Platovsky avenue. The Saint Alexander church was erected near the south end of the park in 1892-96. It was designed by architect N. Anuhin. Wooden church in this place was disassembled.

The chapels were destroyed after the establishment of the Soviet rule in Novocherkassk. Sculpture of Matvey Platov was replaced by Lenin's statue in 1923. Gostiny dvor in the park was partially demolished during the Second World War. The resulting wasteland initial was occupied by a stadium, then by the buildings of the city administration, department store and restaurant. Outdoor cinema 'Udarnick', сafe 'Vesna' and dance floor were erected in the 1950-60s. Main entrance to the park was decorated with arch upon the project architect N. Gladkih. He projected also colonnades in front of the cinema and cafe. The ancient railing was dismantled in the 1970. A ferris wheel was established in Children's Park at this period.

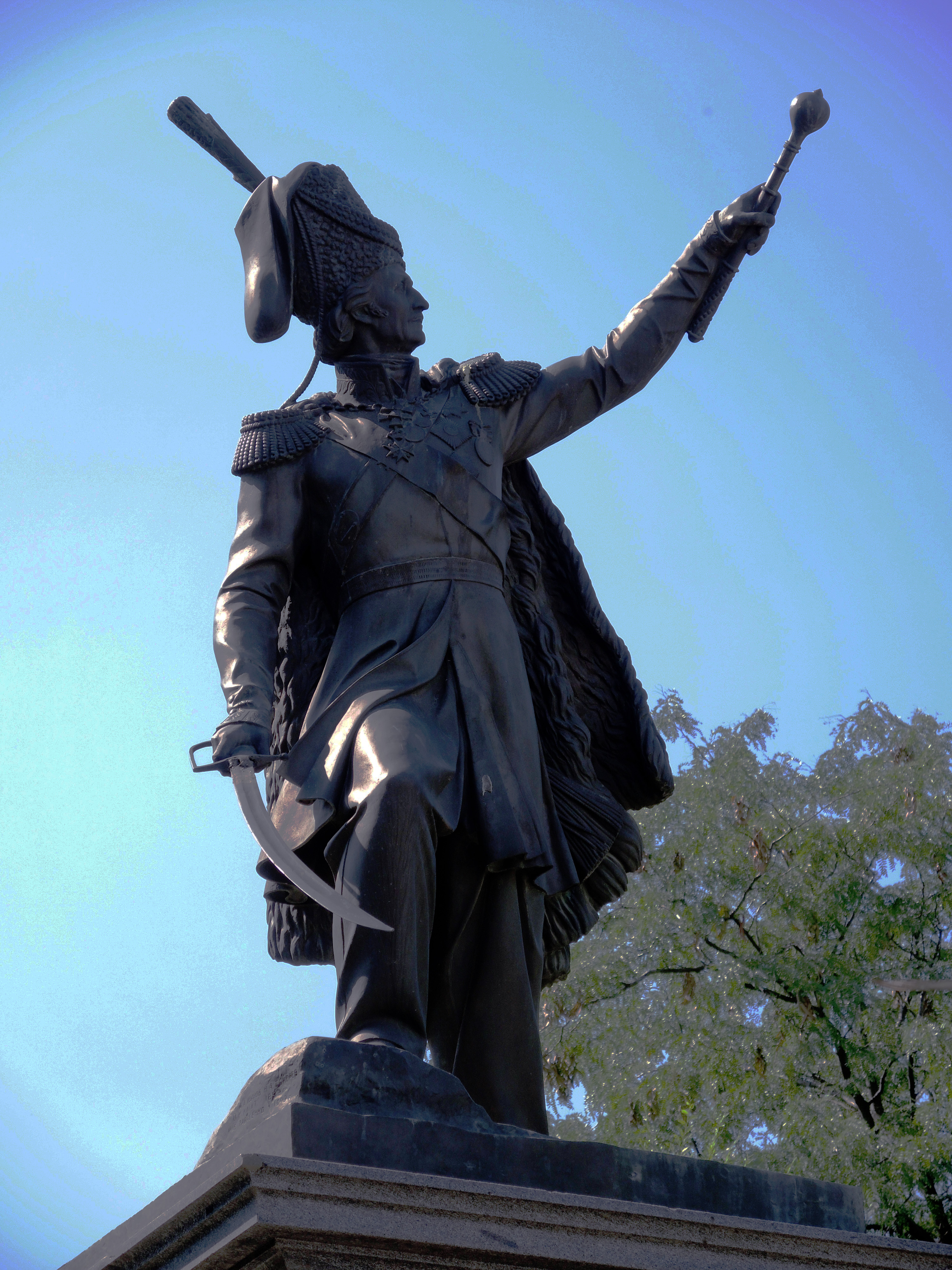
Monument to Matvey Platov

Alexander garden was the scene of the confrontation between workers of Novocherkassk locomotive plant and army units. Strike of workers eventually culminated in riots of June 1–2, 1962 in front of the Ataman palace when reportedly 26 protesters were killed by Soviet Army troops.

The barrow is crowned with a memorial complex. It was erected in honor of those who defended southern Russia. The opening ceremony of the monument took place in 1985 and was held in conjunction 35-year anniversary of the Victory in the Great Patriotic War. Monument to Matvey Platov was re-established on the historical place in 1993.

== Points of interest ==
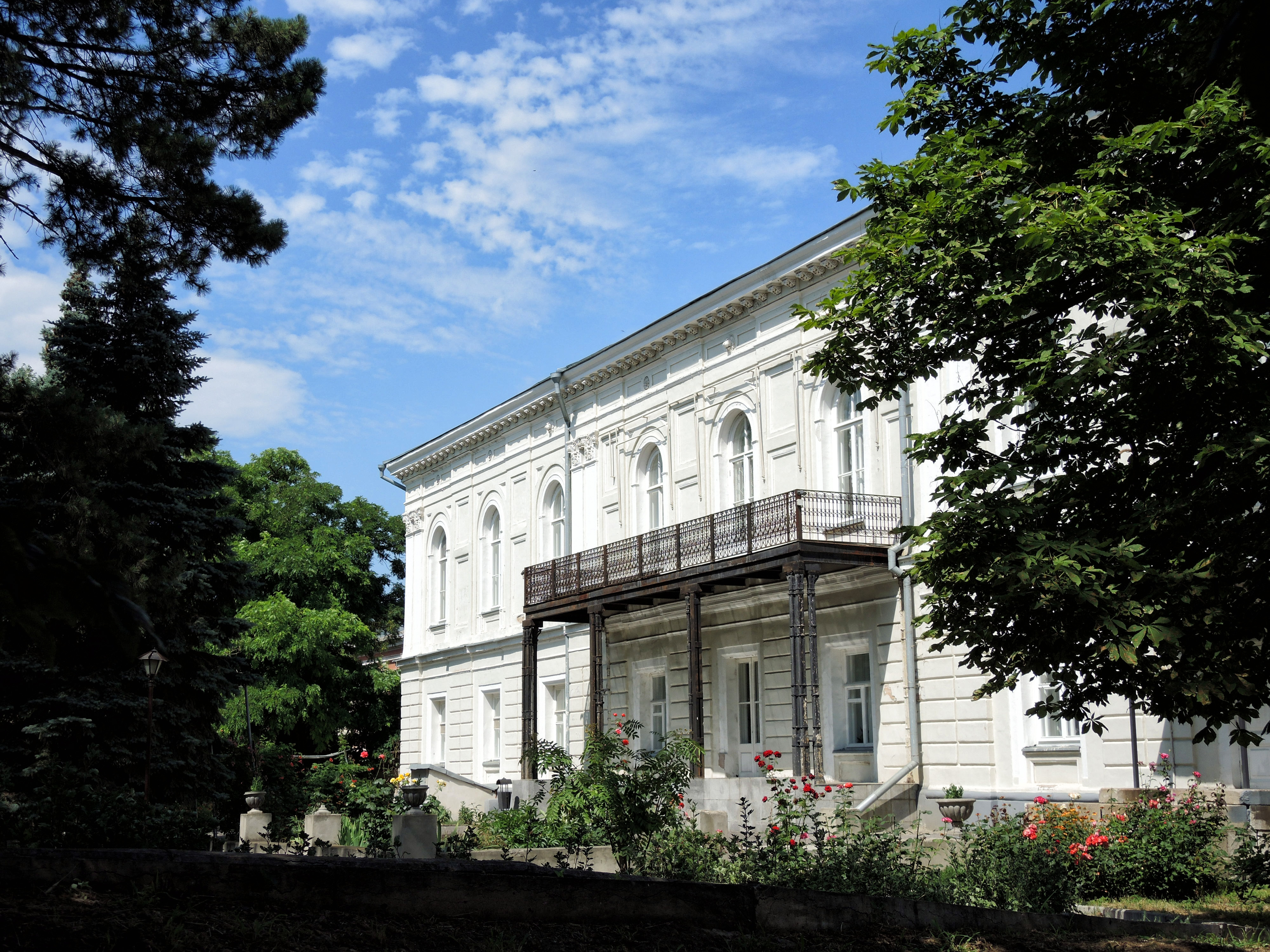
The Ataman palace from Palace Square in Alexander garden

- Monument to Matvei Platov (1853, was reerected in 1993), a sculpture of founder of Novocherkassk designed by sculptor Peter Clodt and architect A. Ivanov. The sculpture was dismantled and cut for scrap by the Bolshevicks in the 1930s. The current monument is the second to stand on this site.
- Ataman Palace is a two-storey palace in empire style designed by I. Valprede. The palace was official residence of the appointed atamans from 1863 to 1917. Russian Emperors Alexander II, Alexander III, Nicholas II visited the Ataman palace. It is an affiliate of the Museum of Don Cossacks since 2001.
