= Alexander Garden (disambiguation) =

Alexander Garden extends along the Moscow Kremlin wall.

Alexander Garden may also refer to:

== Other parks ==
- Alexander Garden (Saint Petersburg), connects Palace Square and St. Isaac's Cathedral in St. Petersburg
- Alexandrovsky Sad (disambiguation) in several other towns
- Alexander Garden (Novocherkassk), Novocherkassk, Rostov oblast, Russia

== People ==
- Alexander Garden (priest) (c. 1685–1756), born in Scotland, lived in South Carolina
- Alexander Garden (naturalist) (1730–1791), his son, naturalist and physician, lived in Scotland, South Carolina, and England
- Alexander Garden (soldier) (1757–1829), his son, born and died in South Carolina, educated in England and Scotland
- Alexander Garden (politician) (1714–1785), Scottish politician representing Aberdeenshire; fourth cousin of the soldier
- Alexander Garden (poet) (c. 1585–c. 1642), also known as Alexander Gardyne, lived in Scotland
