= Pushkinsky lyceum No. 1500 =

Pushkinsky lyceum №1500
- Пушкинский лицей №1500
- Moscow; Russia

Information
- School type: lyceum
- Established: 1 September 1999; 26 years ago
- Headmistress: Schetneva E.E.

State budgetary educational institution of Moscow city "Pushkinsky lyceum №1500" - is a lyceum situated in the center of Moscow.

== History ==
Pushkinsky lyceum №1500 was established on 1 September 1999 by the initiative of academic D.S.Likhachev. In 2011 Pushkinsky lyceum №1500 was united with the school №1481 and from that time it had two buildings (the one on the Milutinsky lane, the second one on the Sretensky boulevard).

In 2015 Pushkinsky lyceum №1500 was united with State budgetary educational institution of Moscow city secondary school №1652, State budgetary educational institution of Moscow city secondary school №282, State budgetary educational institution of Moscow city kindergarten №115, State budgetary educational institution of Moscow city kindergarten №1042, State budgetary educational institution of Moscow city kindergarten №927, State budgetary educational institution of Moscow city kindergarten №37. The full name of this union remains Pushkinsky lyceum №1500.

== Traditions ==
Every year "Likhachev readings" take place in Pushkinsky lyceum №1500. It is an event where students are made into groups according to the subject they want to talk about.

== Education ==
In Pushkinsky lyceum №1500 students get full secondary education. The statistics show that the majority of students go to the university after graduating from Pushkinsky lyceum №1500. Every year half of the graduators receives higher education on the budget basis (at the expense of the state).
