= Monument to Matvei Platov =

Coordinates: 47.4133°N 40.1080°E

- Памятник Матвею Ивановичу Платову
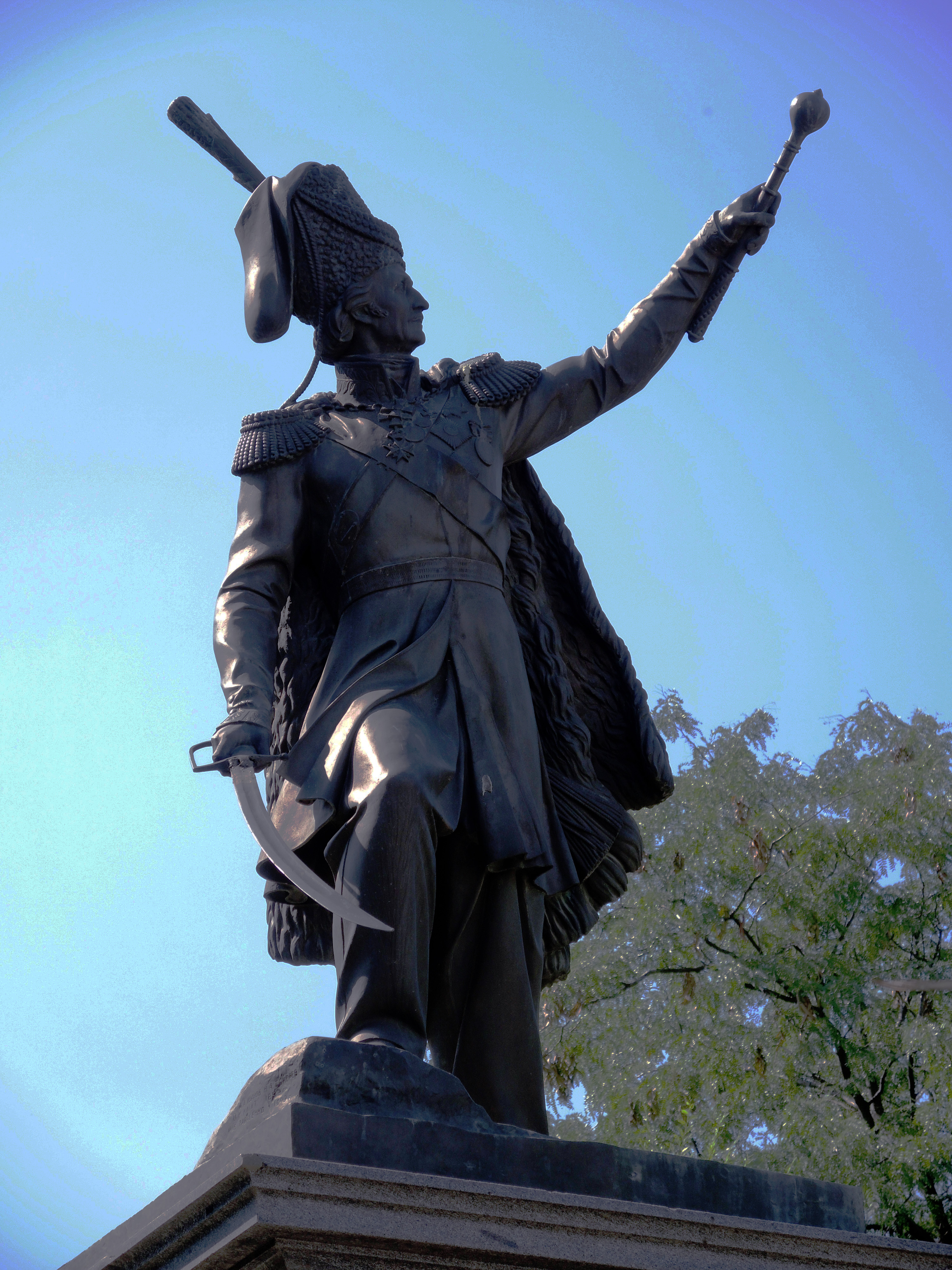
- Interactive map of Monument to Matvei Platov
- Location: Novocherkassk, Rostov Oblast, Russia
- Material: bronze, granite
- Opening date: May 9, 1853
- Restored date: May 16, 1993
- Dedicated to: Matvei Ivanovich Platov
- Dismantled date: 1923

The Monument to Matvei Platov (Russian: Памятник Матвею Ивановичу Платову) is the first sculpture constructed in Novocherkassk, Rostov Oblast, Russia. It is dedicated to Matvei Ivanovich Platov, who was a famous Don Ataman, the founder of Novocherkassk, General of the Cavalry and a hero of the Patriotic War of 1812.

== History ==
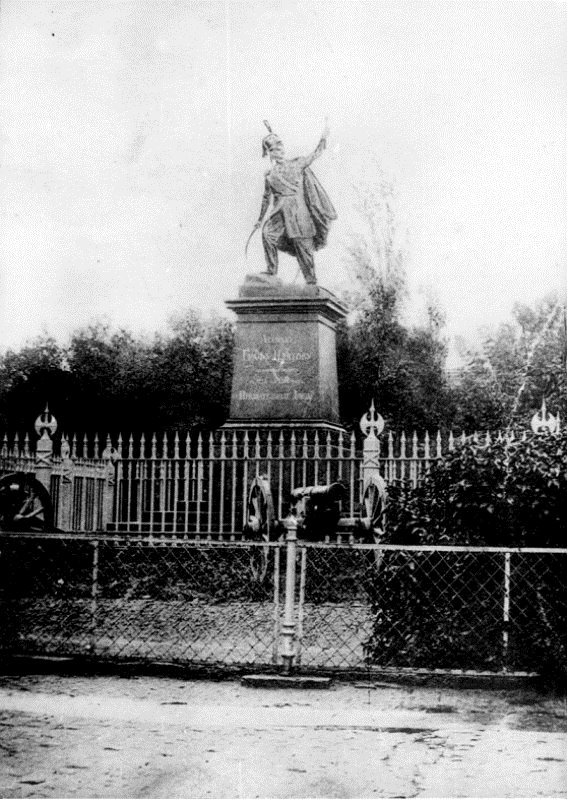
The original monument, early 1900s.

The Monument to Matvei Platov was first established one hundred years after his birth, on May 9, 1853, in the city of Novocherkassk, during the reign of Nicholas I. This monument was built by the famous sculptor Peter Clodt von Jürgensburg and architect A.I. Ivanov. It was placed at Atamansky Garden Square in the city center, in front of the Ataman Palace.

70 years later, in 1923, by decree of the Council of People's Commissars "On the removal of monuments erected in honor of the tsars and their servants..." issued on April 12, 1918, the monument was taken from its pedestal and transferred to Novocherkassk museum. In 1925, on the same place was constructed a monument to Vladimir Lenin.

In 1933, the monument to Platov was melted for bearings at the Novocherkassk Machine-Building Plant.

In 1993, another monument resembling the original version was erected at the same site. However, it is not completely authentic: there is no metal fence around it, no canons, and the fountain has also not been restored in its original form.
