= Museum of Don Cossacks =

Museum in Novocherkassk, Rostov, Russia

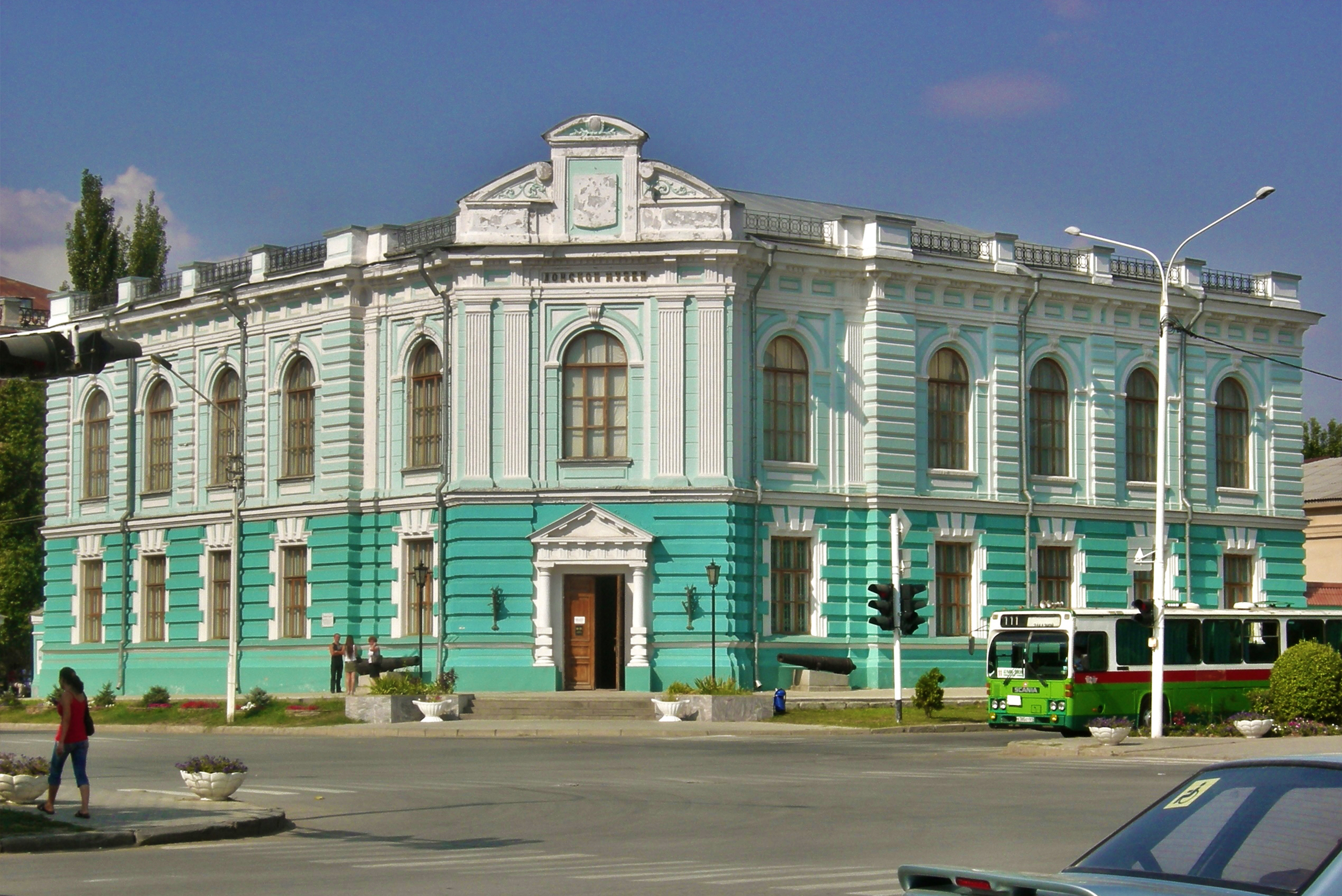

- Location within Russia
- Established: 1886
- Location: 38, Atanamskaya street, Novocherkassk, Rostov oblast, Russia
- Coordinates: 47.412400°N 40.104300°E
- Visitors: 175,000
- Director: Svetlana Sedinko

The Museum of history of Don Cossacks (Russian: Музей истории Донского казачества, Muzyey istorii Donskogo kazachestva) is a museum of art, culture and history of Don Cossacks in Novocherkassk, Rostov oblast, Russia. The oldest museum in Southern Russia, it was founded in 1886. Its collections, of which only 151,000 items is on permanent display, comprise over 200,000 items. The collections occupy a complex of four historic buildings in Novocherkassk: the main building on Atamanskaya street, Memorial House-Museum of painter Ivan Krylov, Memorial House-Museum of painter Mitrofan Grekov and the Ataman palace.

== History ==
The opening of the museum was preceded by major efforts of local historians. The volunteers were united in Society for Don antiquity. The museum building was constructed between 1894 and 1896. It was designed by academician A. Yashchenko. The museum was erected by public donations at first. 30,000 rubles had been collected. The military council of Russian Empire has provided 45,000 rubles.

The opening ceremony took place on 22 November 1899. Museum include six collections: prehistoric, historic, natural historical, library, archival and military regalia. Khariton Popov who founded this museum was the first director. In 1920 due to the Russian Civil War 2726 items were evacuated in Prague. During the Second World War the part of the collection was saved. After the liberation of Novocherkassk the Museum of Don Cossacks reopened. In 1946 the evacuated collections were brought back from Prague National Museum. Nikolay Dubovskoy's art collection was transferred to the Museum in the mid 1940s.

== Collections ==
=== The main building ===
The main building is occupied by the collections of awards and appointed weapons, arm blanches and firearms. Also this exhibition include: Hetman regalia, military and regimental banners from the 18th-19th centuries, Cossacks military and domestic costume from the 19th-early 20th centuries, letters patents, different documents of the Don administration and organizational office. An art gallery is housed in the main building. It is one of the largest art galleries in Rostov oblast. The exhibition presents: Don painted portraits from end of 18th-early 19th centuries, portraits of the emperors and Don appointed atamans, works of the Wanderers. The museum hold valuable collection of antique books and newspapers.

Works by Nikolay Dubovskoy at the museum

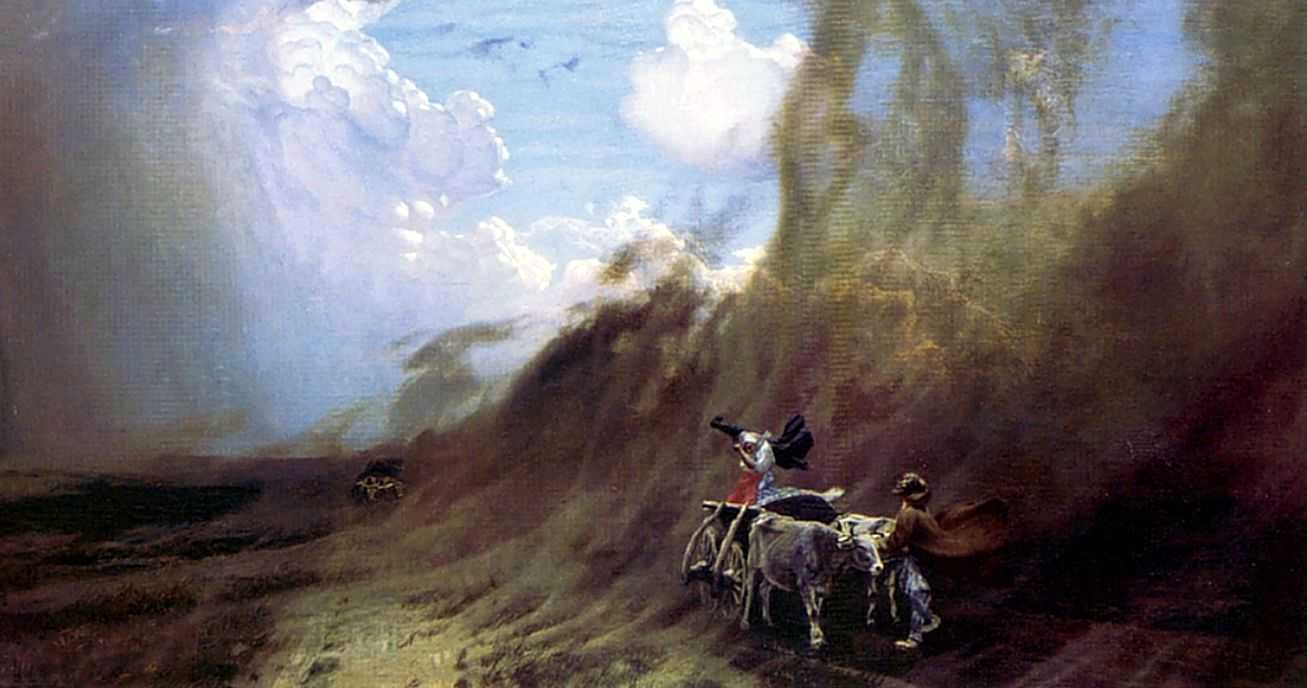
Hurricane in the steppe (1890)

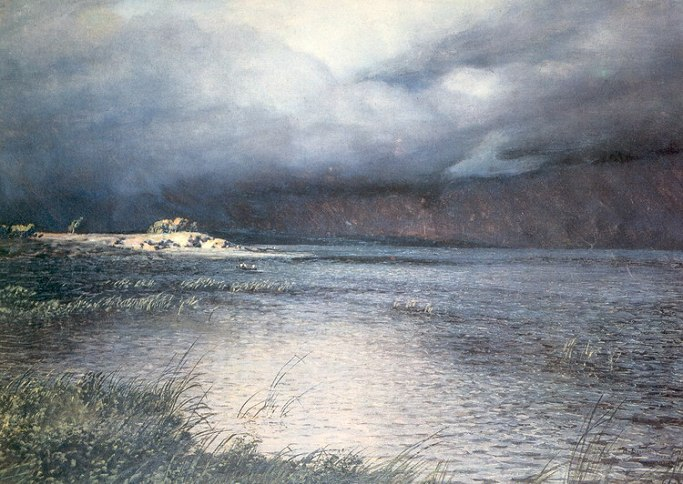
Looming cloud (1912)

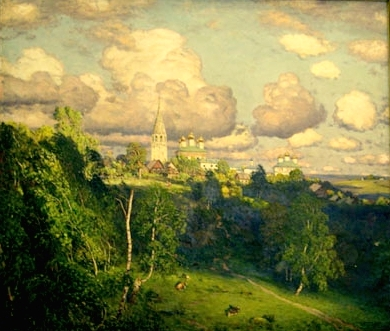
Clowds

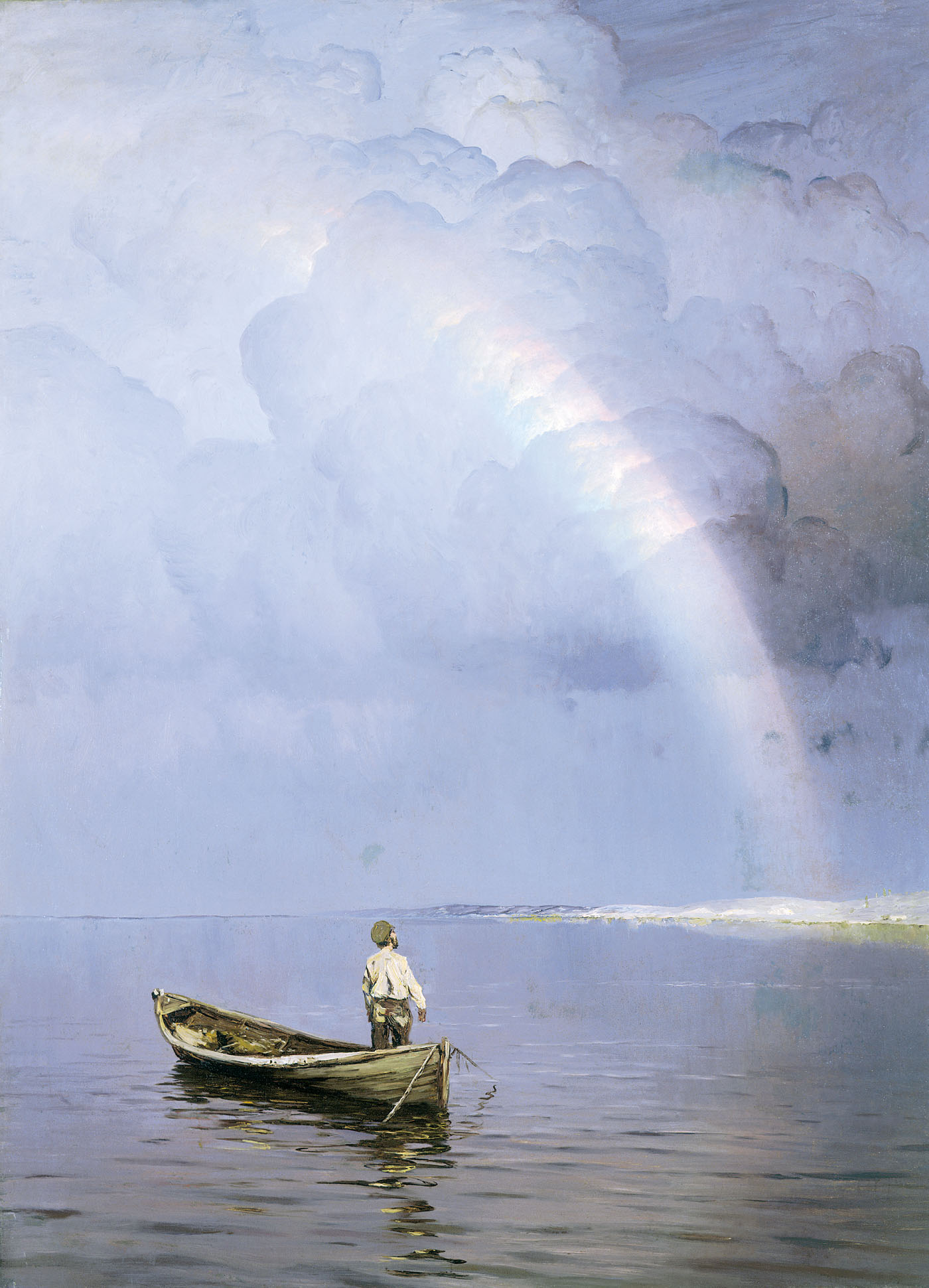
The Rainbow (1892)

=== Memorial House-Museum of Ivan Krylov ===
The house was built near the second half of the 19th century. It is a typical Сossaсk dwelling-house in Novocherkassk of this period.

Painter Ivan Krylov lived in Novocherkassk between 1900 and 1936. Memorial House-Museum is dedicated to the life and work of Russian painter on this period. Total exhibition space covering 108 m². The Memorial House-Museum of Ivan Krylov contains a lot of thinks belonging to painter.

=== Memorial House-Museum of Mitrofan Grekov ===
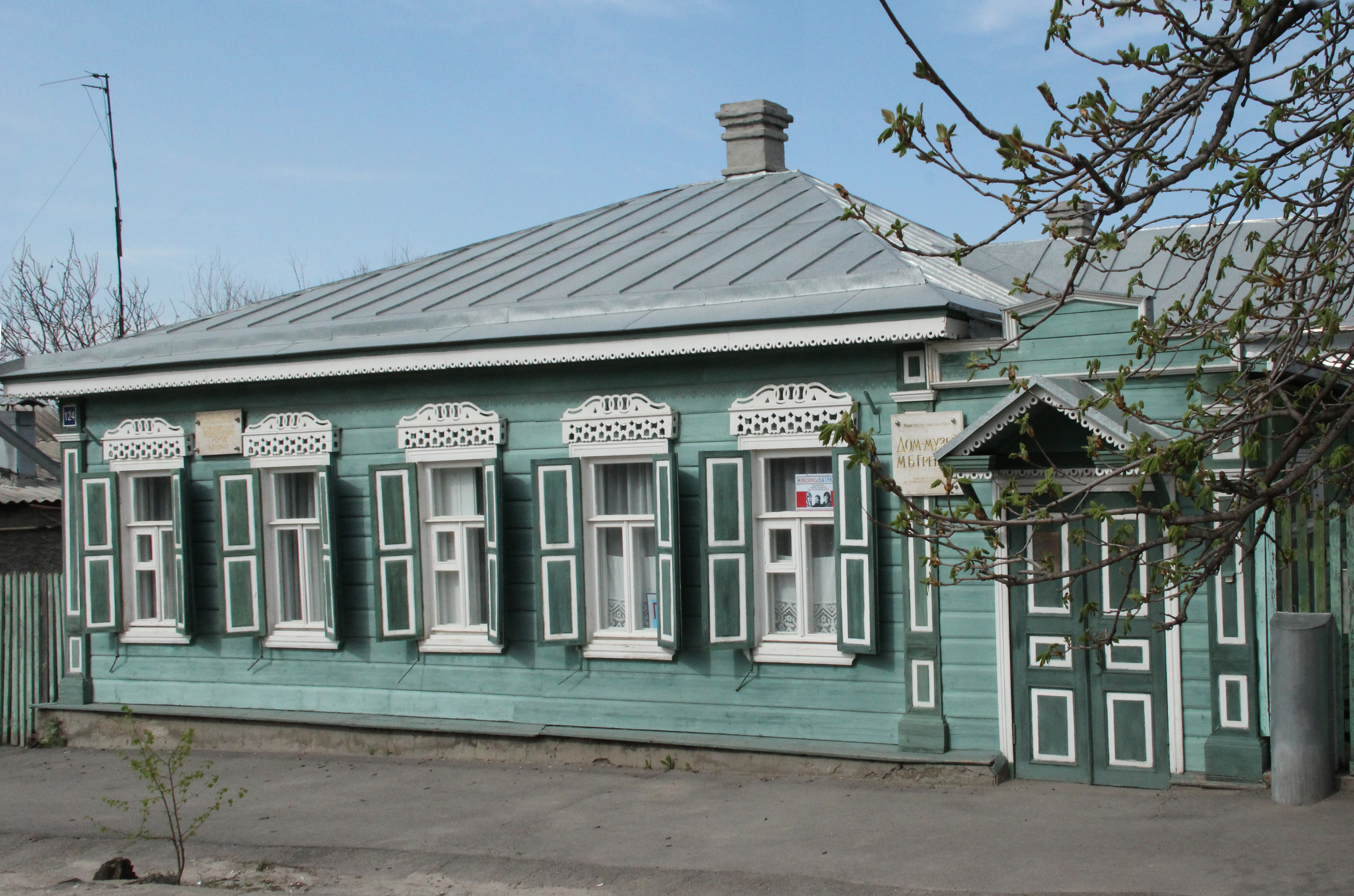
Memorial House-Museum of Mitrofan Grekov

Russian battle painter Mitrofan Grekov spent in Novocherkassk 14 years of his life. At this period Grekov created 94 paintings. The opening ceremony of Memorial House-Museum took place on 30 June 1956 23 years after death of Mitrofan Grekov. The house-museum consists of a wing, small orchard with parterre and the main building where painter was living. The exhibition hold sketches, studies, paintings, easel and original furniture. The museum is considered to be an object of cultural heritage.

=== Ataman palace ===
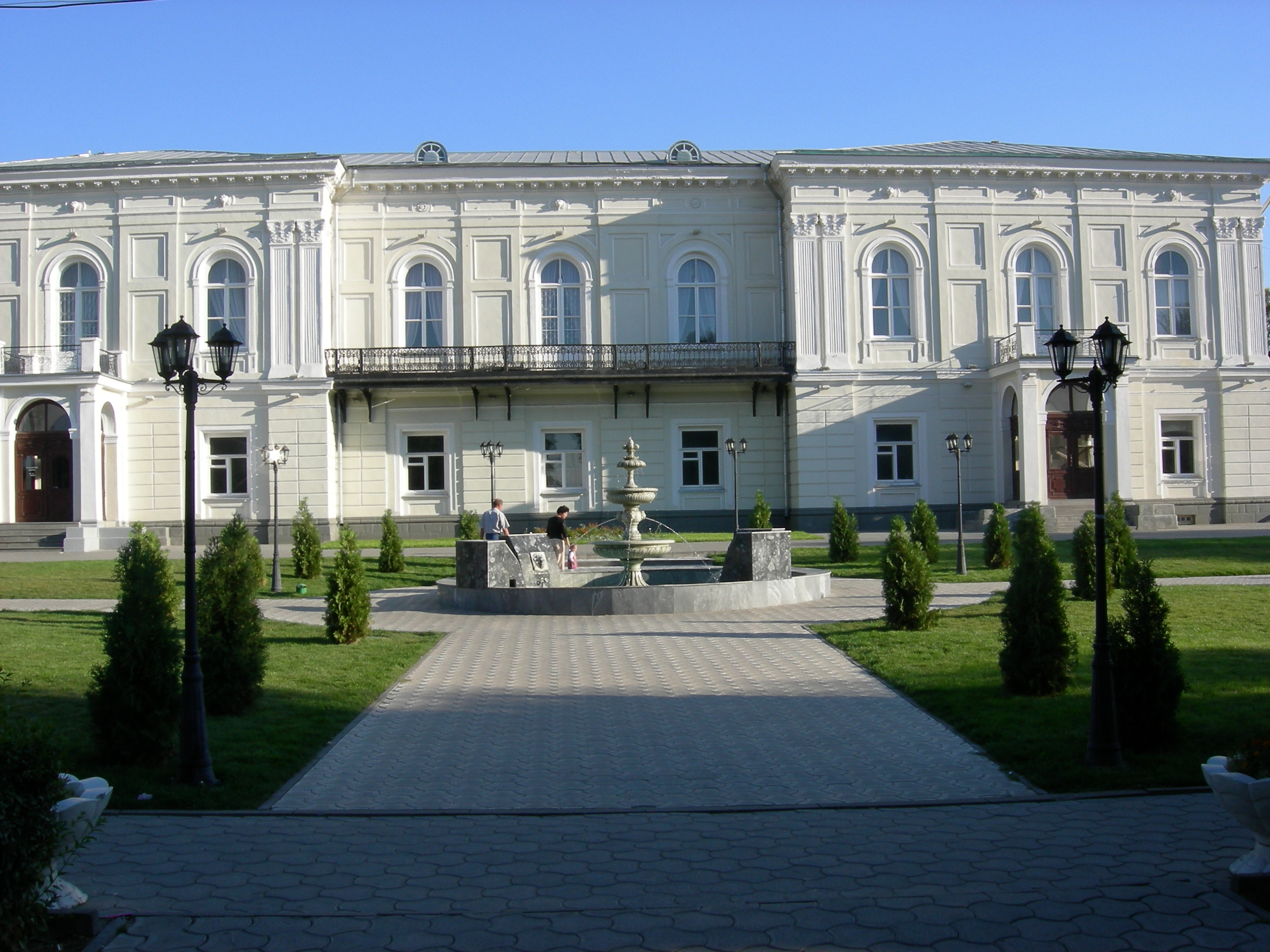
Ataman palace

The Ataman Palace was, from 1863 to 1917, official residence of the appointed atamans. It was constructed between 1860 and 1863. Today, the restored palace forms part of a complex of buildings housing the Museum of history of Don Cossacks. Situated between Platovsky Avenue and the Alexander Garden. The richly decorated interiors of the second floor of the Ataman Palace host the exhibitions about Ataman rule in the Don region.
