= Grekov Studio of War Artists =

Grekov Studio of War Artists Студия военных художников имени М. Б. Грекова
- Formation: 29 November 1934
- Headquarters: 4 Soviet Army Street
- Location: Moscow, Russia
- Coordinates: 55°47′09″N 37°37′06″E
- Official language: Russian
- Chairman: Aleksandr Sytov
- Parent organization: Ministry of Defense of Russia
- Website: grekovstudio.ru

Grekov Studio of War Artists (Russian: Студия военных художников имени М. Б. Грекова) is a state-run creative organization of the Ministry of Defense of Russia. It was founded on November 29, 1934, based on the idea of the master battle painter Mitrofan Grekov and subsequently named after him.

== History ==
On November 29, 1934, by decree of the People's Commissar of Defense of the USSR, Kliment Voroshilov, an amateur art studio was established in memory of the first Soviet battle painter, Mitrofan Borisovich Grekov.

The studio accepted talented Red Army soldiers. The most talented students were given the opportunity to enroll in art schools. In 1938, by order of the Commander of the Moscow Military District, Semyon Budyonny, the art workshop was renamed the Grekov Studio of War Artists.

With the outbreak of the Great Patriotic War, many Grekov artists were sent to the front. Throughout the war, the Grekov Studio's artists, serving in the active army, recorded everything they saw and experienced, which allowed them to accurately and convincingly convey the horrors of war.

The Grekov posters "We'll Defend Moscow!" by Nikolai Zhukov and Viktor Klimashin, "We'll Reach Berlin!", and "We've Got It! Glory to the Red Army!" by L. F. Golovanov became symbols of the war.

The final chord of the war for the Studio was the participation of the Studio's artistic director, graphic artist Nikolai Zhukov, in the Nuremberg Trials. The result of this trip was a series of over two hundred drawings of this historic event.

The most significant and large-scale projects in the Studio's Soviet history include: the monument-ensemble "To the Soldiers of the Soviet Army Who Died in the Battles Against Fascism" (Treptower Park, Berlin); the panorama "The Battle of Stalingrad", which is the centerpiece of the memorial ensemble-museum "The Battle of Stalingrad" in Volgograd; the diorama "The Storming of Sapun Mountain on May 7, 1944" in Sevastopol; and two of the largest dioramas in the USSR: "The Jassy-Kishinev Operation" in Chisinau and "The Fiery Arc" in Belgorod.

The Studio building was constructed in the Soviet modernist style, designed by Yuri Krivushchenko, who was inspired by the works of Le Corbusier. At the same time, it has increased defensive capacity, which has allowed the building to survive to this day in its original form.

Among the Studio's most significant contemporary works are the diorama complex at the Central Museum of the Great Patriotic War on Poklonnaya Hill, the murals of the Cathedral of Christ the Saviour in Moscow, the diorama "The Stand on the Ugra" at the Vladimir Skete of the St. Tikhon Hermitage in Kaluga Oblast, and the sculptural compositions "The First World War 1914-1918" and "Victory in the Great Patriotic War 1941-1945," installed on Frunzenskaya Embankment in Moscow.

The Studio's artists' work includes numerous projects, including the memorial composition "To the Heroes of Ladoga—the Road of Life" in St. Petersburg (by L. A. Semikopenko), the memorial complex to soldiers of the 2nd Shock Army "Those Who Died in Defense of the Fatherland" on the M-11 highway (by M. M. Malashenko), the monument "To the Hero Tanker" in Kazan (by D. V. Klavsuts), the monument "Fighter Against Terrorism" in Patriot Park (by L. A. Semikopenko), and sculptural compositions based on the films "Officers" and "They Fought for Their Country" in front of the Russian Ministry of Defense building in Moscow (by A. I. Ignatov).

Currently, 32 artists and sculptors work at the Studio. Eight of them have been awarded the title of People's Artist, and four have been awarded the title of Honored Artist. The Studio's main building is located next to the Central Armed Forces Museum. It houses creative workshops and an exhibition hall for temporary exhibitions. In 2020, a permanent exhibition of the Grekov Studio of Military Artists opened in Patriot Park. Among the Studio's most significant contemporary works are the diorama complex at the Central Museum of the Great Patriotic War on Poklonnaya Hill, the murals of the Cathedral of Christ the Saviour, the diorama "The Stand on the Ugra" at the Vladimir Skete of the St. Tikhon Hermitage in Kaluga Oblast, and the sculptural compositions "The First World War 1914-1918" and "Victory in the Great Patriotic War 1941-1945" installed on Frunzenskaya Embankment in Moscow.

The Studio's artists' work includes numerous projects, including the memorial composition "To the Heroes of Ladoga—the Road of Life" in St. Petersburg (by L. A. Semikopenko), the memorial complex to soldiers of the 2nd Shock Army "Those Who Died in Defense of the Fatherland" on the M-11 highway (by M. M. Malashenko), the monument "To the Hero Tanker" in Kazan (by D. V. Klavsuts), the monument "Fighter Against Terrorism" in Patriot Park (by L. A. Semikopenko), and sculptural compositions based on the films "Officers" and "They Fought for Their Country" in front of the Russian Ministry of Defense building in Moscow (by A. I. Ignatov).

Currently, 32 artists and sculptors work at the Studio. Eight of them have been awarded the title of People's Artist, and four have been awarded the title of Honored Artist. The Studio's main building is located next to the Central Museum of the Russian Armed Forces. It houses creative workshops and an exhibition hall for temporary exhibitions. In 2020, a permanent exhibition of the Grekov Studio of Military Artists opened in Patriot Park.
