= Dmitry Likhachev =

Russian medievalist and linguist

- Дмитрий Лихачёв
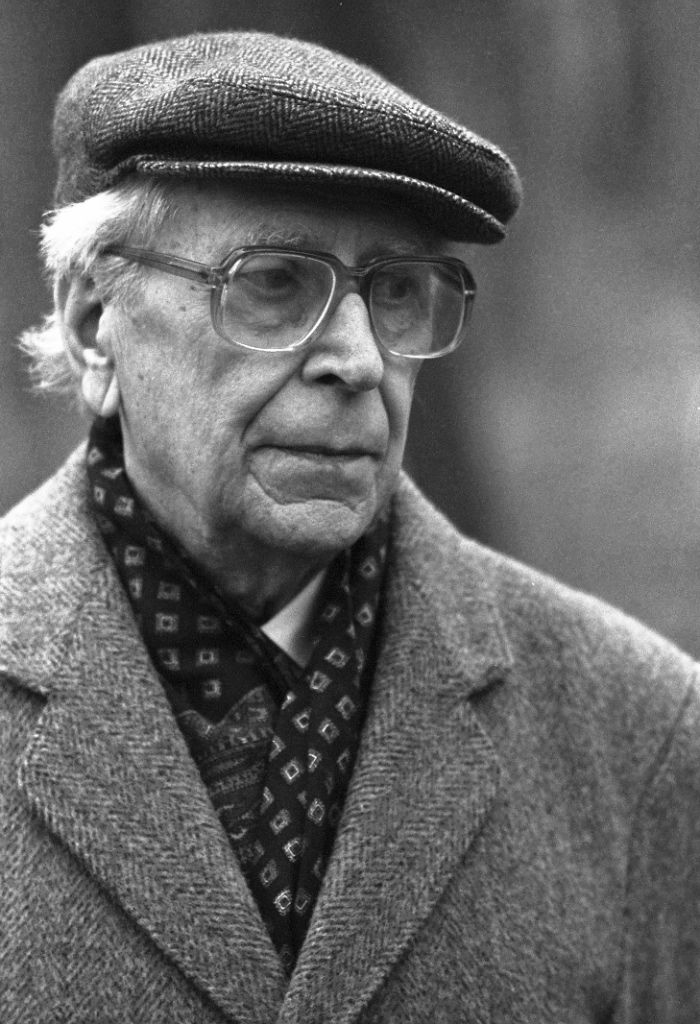
- Likhachev in 1990
- Born: Dmitry Sergeyevich Likhachev; 28 November [O.S. 15 November] 1906; Saint Petersburg, Russian Empire
- Died: 30 September 1999 (aged 92); Saint Petersburg, Russian Federation
- Resting place: Komarovo Cemetery; 60°12′15″N 29°47′59″E, Saint Petersburg
- Education: Leningrad State University
- Occupations: Medievalist, linguist, writer
- Spouse: Zinaida Makarovna (m. 1936–1999)
- Children: Vera; Lyudmila
- Awards: Hero of the Soviet Union; Hero of Socialist Labour; Order of Saint Andrew

Dmitry Sergeyevich Likhachev (Russian: Дми́трий Серге́евич Лихачёв, also spelled Dmitrii Likhachev or Dmitry Likhachov; 28 November [O.S. 15 November] 1906 – 30 September 1999) was a Russian medievalist, linguist, and an inmate of Gulag. During his lifetime, Likhachev was considered the world's foremost scholar of the Old Russian language and its literature.

He was revered as "the last of old St Petersburgers", and as "a guardian of national culture". Due to his high profile as a Soviet dissident writer, social critic, and activist during his later life, Likhachev was often referred to as "Russia's conscience".

== Life and career ==
=== Childhood and concentration camp (1906 – 1931) ===
Dmitry Likhachev was born in Saint Petersburg. From his early childhood he had a passion for literature, even though his parents did not approve of this interest.

In a 1987 interview with David Remnick, Likhachev recalled how he had, "watched the February and October Revolutions from his window."

In 1923, at only 16 years old, Likhachev entered the Department of Linguistics and Literature of Leningrad State University. He attended the Roman-Germanic and Slavic-Russian sections at the same time, undertaking two diplomas. At the university the young Likhachev met many outstanding scientists and developed his own way of thinking. Likhachev graduated in 1928 from the Leningrad University. In 1928, at the end of his studies, Likhachev was arrested and accused of being a member of what Remnick called, "a students' literary group called the Cosmic Academy of Sciences", which "posed about as great a threat to the Kremlin as the Harvard Lampoon does to the White House."

For his election to the "Cosmic Academy", Likhachev had presented a short report, in which he poked fun at the new spelling rules of 1918 and urged that they be "reformed" by restoring the banned letter "Yat". After his arrest, Likhachev was confronted with the paper by a Soviet secret police interrogator, who screamed, "What do you mean by language reform? Perhaps we won't even have any language at all under Socialism!"

After nine months in jail, the young scientist was unlawfully exiled without trial and spent five years in the USSR's first concentration camp, located on the Solovetsky Islands in the White Sea.

Deported to the Solovki Special Purpose Camp, he spent 5 years studying "criminal folklore" (as he termed it). Dmitry Likhachev wrote his first scientific article, "Card Games of Criminals", in the camp. He didn't play cards himself, but was a keen observer. He also gathered much material about the language of thieves and later published articles and a book about thieves' slang and customs.

At the camp, hard work, poor living conditions and illness dramatically damaged Likhachev's health, but he survived. On the Solovetsky Islands he met both exiled Russian intellectuals and real criminals, who happened to save his life. As Dmitry Likhachev said many years later, "At the Solovki, I understood that every person is a person."

Whilst on the islands, for some period of time Dmitry Likhachev worked as a member of the Criminological Cabinet, organizing a labor colony for teenagers and saving them from death caused by hunger, drugs, and cold.

On the night of 28 October 1929, he was summoned from a visit with his parents and ordered to join a party of 300 prisoners destined for execution. Wishing to spare his parents the trauma, Likhachev told them that he had been summoned for night work and that they should not wait for him. He then hid behind a wood pile and listened as the three hundred prisoners were shot and thrown into a mass grave. The next morning, Likhachev returned from his hiding place as a completely different man. In a 1987 interview with David Remnick, Likhachev recalled the events of that night and concluded, "The executioner is older than me, and he is still alive."

From 1931, Likhachev was a worker on the construction of the Stalin White Sea–Baltic Canal until his release.

=== Education (1931 – 1947) ===
Likhachev returned to Leningrad and started his scholarly career in the Pushkin House (as the Russian Literature Institute is known), which spanned more than 60 years and saw the publication of more than 500 scholarly works. Likhachev did not stop his work even during the Siege of Leningrad. He believed that Russia was an integral and indivisible part of European civilization, contrary to "Euroasiatic" views of Russia popular with Lev Gumilev, Boris Rybakov, and many other contemporaries.

Likhachev worked for five years as a proofreader in the publishing house of the Academy of Sciences of the USSR. In 1936, thanks to petitions by the president of the Academy of Sciences, Aleksandr Karpinsky, Dmitry Likhachev's criminal record was cleared. In 1938 the talented scientist was noticed and invited to the Department of Old Russian Literature of the Institute of Russian Literature (known as the Pushkin House). Dmitry Likhachev worked here until the end of his life.

Old Russian literature, which at that time did not receive much academic attention, became the main scientific interest of Dmitry Likhachev who, by the beginning of the 1940s, was one of the most renowned specialists in this sphere. In 1941 Likhachev presented his thesis "The Novgorod Annalistic Corpus of the 12th Century".

World War II brought new trials. Likhachev, together with his wife and twin daughters, survived the horrors of the siege of Leningrad (1941-1944). He described his experience in a story, full of harsh details, exposing different types of people and their heroic or appalling behavior when faced with starvation and death. In 1942, completely exhausted by hunger and cold, Dmitry Likhachev started to gather materials on medieval poetry and soon published the book Defense of the Old Russian Cities. In 1943 Likhachev and his entire family were exiled to Kazan, supposedly because of the "connection with the Solovetsky Camp". But by the end of the war they had returned to Leningrad.

=== Academic career and legacy (1947 – 1999) ===
In 1947 Dmitry Likhachev received his Doctorate in Philology, having presented his thesis "Essays on the History of Annalistic Literary Forms of the 11th–16th Centuries". Three years later he became a professor at the Leningrad State University. From 1953 he was a corresponding member - and from 1970 a member of the Academy of Sciences of the USSR.

1950 marked the publication of Likhachev's two-volume edition containing unique, important literary works translated into the modern Russian language: The Primary Chronicle, a history of Kievan Rus' from the 9th to the 12th centuries, and The Lay of the Host of Igor, an account based on a failed raid by Prince Igor Svyatoslavich of Novgorod-Seversk against the Cumans in 1185.

Dmitry Likhachev was not a scientist detached from everyday life. From the 1950s he began a campaign to save the wooden temples of the Russian North and to preserve the historical appearance of Russian cities. He helped found the museums of Dostoevsky, Pushkin and Pasternak.

In 1953 Likhachev was admitted into the Soviet Academy of Sciences as a corresponding member. He defended Andrei Sakharov, Aleksandr Solzhenitsyn and other dissidents during their persecution by Soviet authorities.

In the 1960s Likhachev was one of the initiators of a movement for the protection of historical monuments, libraries and archives. Thanks to Likhachev many monuments were saved, including Marina Tsvetaeva's flat in Moscow, the Nevsky Prospect in Leningrad (which was supposed to be turned into a shopping street) and Aleksandr's Garden. In the 1980s he headed the Soviet (later renamed Russian) Cultural Fund, supporting the process of the Orthodox Church's reclaiming of its temples, formerly appropriated by the Soviet government. The scientist also participated in the preservation of national minorities in danger of dying out while aiding the return to Russia of émigré public and cultural figures.

In 1980 Likhachev was one of the members of the Academy of Sciences who refused to sign a letter requesting the expulsion of the scientist Andrei Sakharov from the Academy because of Sakharov's public disapproval of the dispatch of Soviet troops to Afghanistan in 1979.

Despite his busy social life, Likhachev still spent a lot of time on philological work. Focusing on Old Russian literature, he developed the concept of artistic time and space. In 1969 the researcher was awarded with the USSR State Prize for his work "Poetics of Old Russian Literature".

Dmitry Likhachev gained worldwide recognition as a theorist of culture and as a public intellectual. In the 1980s he developed a concept that considered the problems of humanization and the reorientation of educational goals and ideas. The scientist viewed culture as a historical memory and as a process of accumulation, rather than merely a sequence of consecutive changes. This stance was also the theoretical basis for Likhachev's attention to ancient monuments, especially in architecture. Inspired by the works of Vladimir Vernadsky, Dmitry Likhachev suggested the idea of a “homosphere”- a human sphere of the Earth. His original contribution to general science was also the development of a new discipline called the ecology of culture, which was defined as an essential sphere of human life.

One of the emphases of Likhachev's ideas was the correlation between culture and nature. In his book Poetics of the Gardens (1982), park and garden art was for the first time considered as a semiotic reflection of major cultural and artistic styles and their corresponding ideologies.

In Moscow and St. Petersburg, in 1986 he created the International Association of intellectuals and creative "Myr Culture", with the writer Nicolaj Sanvelian, the Italian economist and writer Giancarlo Pallavicini and other leading writers, artists and scientists, he was inspiring and President for many years.

In 1986 he was elected the first president of the Russian Cultural Fund. In his 1980s and 1990s, he became more of a public figure, serving as an informal advisor to St. Petersburg Mayor Anatoly Sobchak and Russian president Boris Yeltsin. In October 1993 he signed the Letter of Forty-Two. In the same year, he became the first person to be named an Honorary Citizen of St Petersburg. He also presided over the commission set up to prepare for Alexander Pushkin's bicentenary.

Likhachev thought about his life journey as a vertical movement, towards a heavenly home. The reflections of his experience as a person are written in the book “Reminiscences” (1995).

During the first visit to Rome Gorbachev, Myr Culture has officially handed over, on behalf of the intellectual-creative in the world, a cultural program, called "Manifesto of the three" by the signatories founders of the association, the Russian spokesman Zagladin presented the world's press at the Foro Italico, in 1998, as an instance of cultural freedom for Russia and for the world, signed by Dmitry Likhachev, Nicolaj Sanvelian e Giancarlo Pallavicini.

The last works by Dmitry Likhachev gathered together his general ideas about his native country. The book Thoughts About Russia, completed in 1999, a few days before the author's death, is devoted to Russia'’s place in world history, its myths and its most characteristic features. The edition Russian Culture was published posthumously in 2000.

As a great scientist, Likhachev was a foreign member of the Academies of Sciences of Bulgaria, Hungary and Serbia and a corresponding member of the Austrian, American, British, Italian and Göttingen Academies. In 1984 the minor planet 2877 was named after Likhachev.

A year before his death, Likhachev became the very first recipient of the reinstated Order of St. Andrew.

Dmitry Likhachev died on 30 September 1999.

In 2001 Likhachev's daughter and George Soros established the Likhachov Philanthropic Fund.

== Family ==
In 1936, Likhachev married Zinaida Makarova (1907-2000), who devoted her entire life to her husband. They had twin daughters, Lyudmila and Vera (born 1937). His granddaughter Vera Tolz-Zilitinkevic is Sir William Mather Professor of Russian at Manchester University, UK.

== Legacy ==
A minor planet 2877 Likhachev discovered in 1969 by Soviet astronomer Lyudmila Chernykh is named after him.

== Honours ==
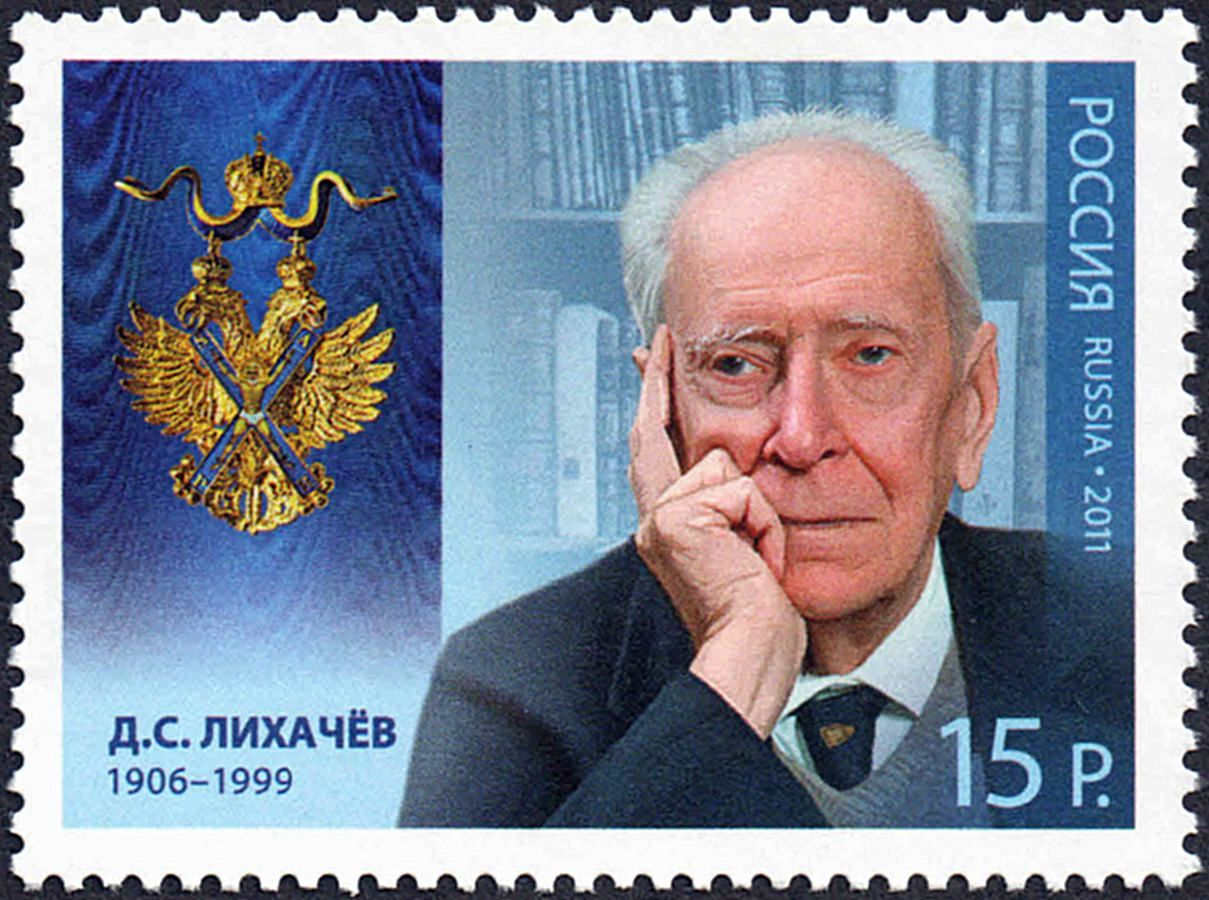
Dmitry Likhachev on a 2011 Russian stamp

- 1952 – Stalin Prize
- 1963 – Elected to the Bulgarian Academy of Sciences
- 1964 – Honorary doctorate of the Torun University
- 1964 – Honorary doctorate of the Oxford University
- 1966 – Order of the Red Banner of Labour
- 1968 – Elected to the Austrian Academy of Sciences
- 1970 – Elected to the Soviet Academy of Sciences
- 1964 – Honorary doctorate of the Edinburgh University
- 1969 – USSR State Prize
- 1972 – Elected to the Serbian Academy of Sciences
- 1973 – Elected to the Hungarian Academy of Sciences
- 1983 – Honorary doctorate of the University of Bordeaux
- 1983 – Honorary doctorate of the University of Zurich
- 1985 – Honorary doctorate of the Budapest University
- 1986 – Hero of Socialist Labour
- 1987 – Elected to the Lincean Academy
- 1988 – Honorary doctorate of the University of Göttingen
- 1991 – Honorary doctorate of the Charles University
- 1992 – Honorary doctorate of the University of Siena
- 1993 – Elected to the American Academy of Arts and Sciences
- 1993 – Lomonosov Gold Medal
- 1993 – Honorary Citizen of his native city, Saint Petersburg
- 1995 – Elected to the American Philosophical Society
- 1996 – Order "For Merit to the Fatherland", Order II class.
- 1998 – Order of St. Andrew
- 2000 – Russian State Prize

=== Medals ===
- Medal "For the Defence of Leningrad"
- Medal "For Valiant Labour in the Great Patriotic War 1941-1945"
- Medal "For Labour Valour"
- Jubilee Medal "In Commemoration of the 100th Anniversary since the Birth of Vladimir Il'ich Lenin"
- Jubilee Medal "Twenty Years of Victory in the Great Patriotic War 1941-1945"
- Jubilee Medal "Thirty Years of Victory in the Great Patriotic War 1941-1945"
- Jubilee Medal "Forty Years of Victory in the Great Patriotic War 1941-1945"
- Medal "Veteran of Labour"

== Main works ==
- 1942 – Defense of Old Russian Towns
- 1945 – National Self-Consciousness of Ancient Rus
- 1947 – Russian Chronicles and Their Cultural Significance
- 1950 – The Tale of Bygone Years (2 volumes)
- 1952 – Genesis of the Tale of Igor's Campaign
- 1955 – The Lay of Igor's Campaign
- 1958 – Human Dimension of the Old Russian Literature
- 1962 – Russian Culture at the Times of Andrei Rublev and Epiphanius the Wise
- 1962 – Textology
- 1967 – The Poetics of Early Russian Literature (Russian: Поэтика древнерусской литературы, romanized: Poetika Drevnerusskoy Literatury)
- 1971 – Artistic Heritage of Ancient Rus in Our Time
- 1973 – Development of Old Russian Literature: the Epochs and Styles
- 1975 – Great Heritage: Classic Works of Old Russian Literature
- 1976 – Laughing World of Ancient Rus
- 1978 – The Tale of Igor's Campaign and Culture of That Time
- 1981 – Russian Notes
- 1981 – Literature – Reality – Literature
- 1982 – The Poetry of Gardens
- 1985 – Letters about the Kind and Beautiful
- 1987 – Selected Works, in Three Volumes
- 1989 – From the Note-Books of Various Years
- 1992 – Russian Art from the Antiquity to Avantgarde
- 1995 – Reminiscences
- 1996 – Essays on the Philosophy of Artistic Creativity
- 1997 – Articles on Intelligentsia
- 1999 – Meditations about Russia
- 2000 – Essays on Russian Culture
