= House-Museum of Mitrofan Grekov =

Museum in Novocherkassk, Rostov, Russia

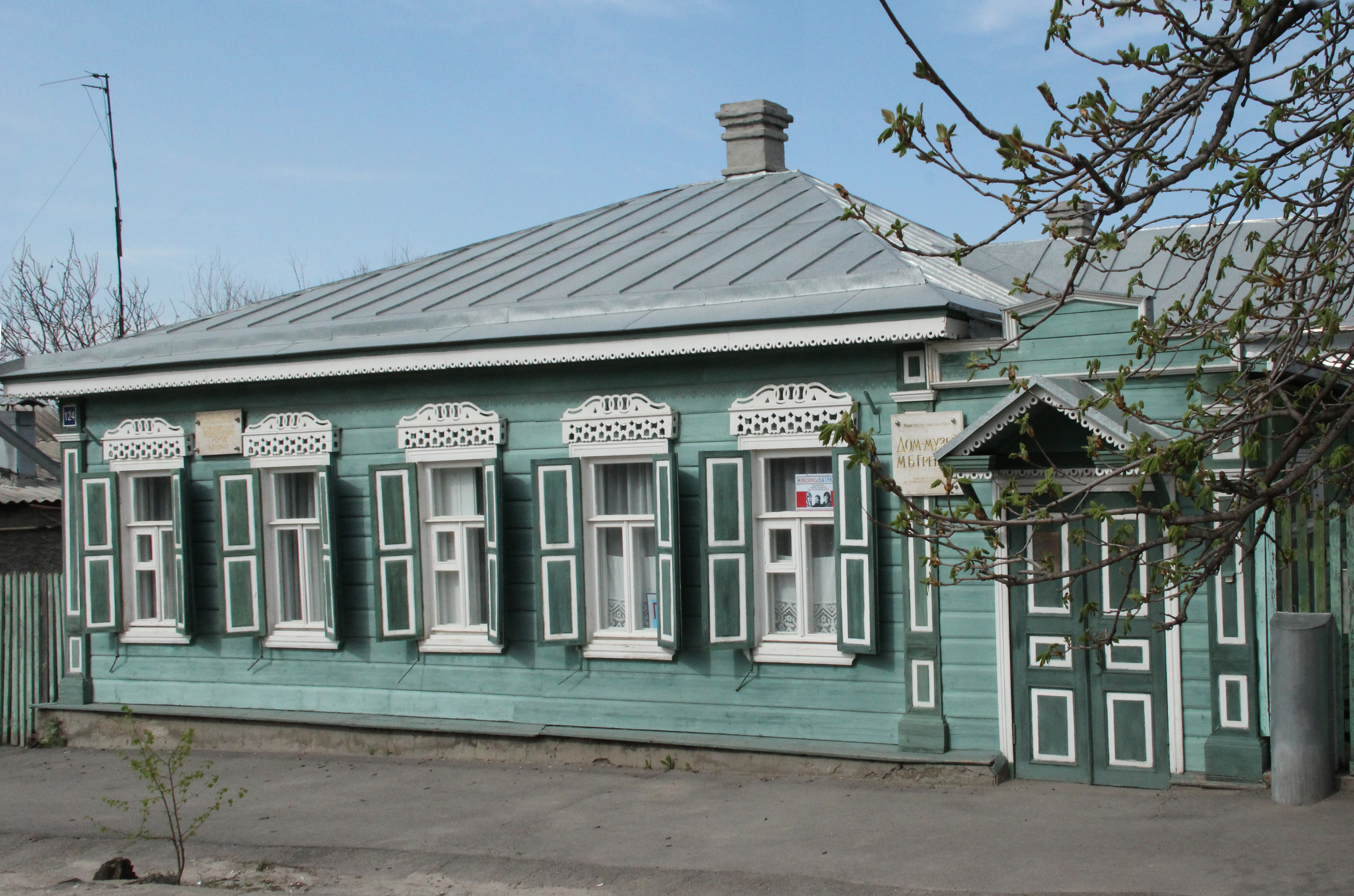

- Location within Russia
- Established: 30 March 1957
- Location: 124, Grekova street, Novocherkassk, Rostov oblast Russia
- Coordinates: 47.423159°N 40.102608°E

The House-Museum of Mitrofan Grekov (Russian: Дом-музей Митрофана Грекова) opened in 1957 in Novocherkassk, Rostov oblast, Russia and is devoted to the exhibition of the Soviet battle painter's things, sketches, as well as to the research and study of his creative output. It is an affiliate of the Museum of Don Cossacks. An historic building of the museum is considered to be an object of cultural heritage.

== History ==
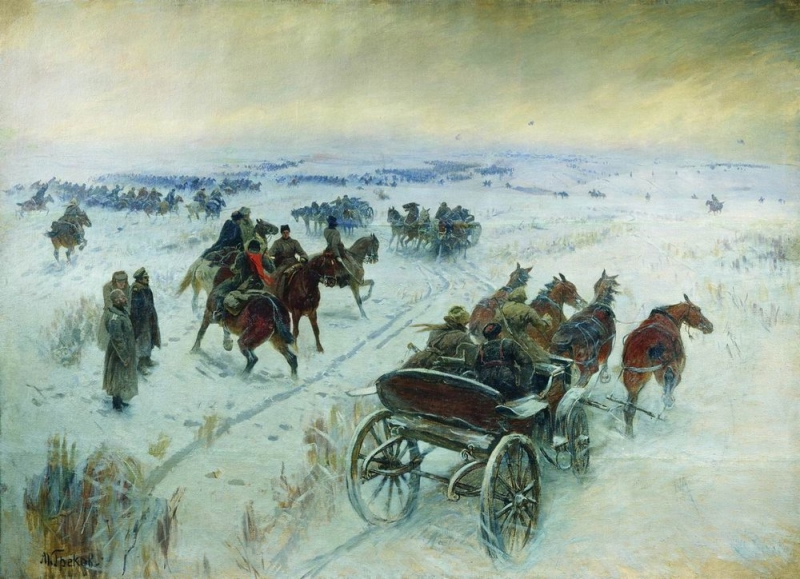
Battle of stanitsa of Yegorlyvskaya

Battle painter Martyshchenko Mitrofan Pavlovich primarily known as Mitrofan Grekov was born in khutor of Sharpaevka, Don Host Oblast, Russian Empire on 3 June 1882. He graduated from Odessa art school and the Saint Petersburg Academy of Arts. Grekov is founder of Soviet battle genre. He spent in Novocherkassk 14 years of his life. Grekov lived here from June 1918 to 1931. At this period Grekov created 94 paintings include To the squadron with Budyonny (1923), Tachanka (1925), Mounted attack (1927), Battle of stanitsa of Yegorlyvskaya (1927-1928), the first Soviet diorama Siege of Rostov. Mitrofan Grekov had served in Novocherkassk for four years and three months. Novocherkassk period of activity has been the most productive in the painter's biography. The opening ceremony of the House-Museum took place on 30 March 1957 23 years after death of Mitrofan Grekov.

== Description ==
The house-museum consists of a wing, small orchard with parterre and the main building where painter was living. The exhibition hold sketches, studies, paintings and original furniture. Bust of Mitrofan Grekov is located in the courtyard. An easel, stool, sofa, armchair, closet are exhibited in the Grekov's workshop. Walls are decorated by the paintings and sketches. The museum has several collection of other battle painters.
