= Alexandrovsky Sad =

Alexandrovsky Sad:

- Alexander Garden
- Aleksandrovsky Sad (Moscow Metro)
- Alexander Garden (St. Petersburg)
- Alexander Garden (Nizhny Novgorod)
- Alexander Garden (Kirov)
- Alexandrovsky Sad (TV series, 2005)
- Alexandrovsky Sad (TV series, 2007)
- Alexandrovsky Sad (TV series, 2008)
