= Mitrofan Grekov =

Russian painter (1882–1934)

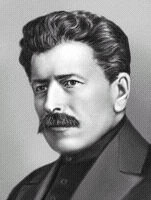
- Born: Mitrofan Pavlovich Martyshchenko; June 15, 1882; Khutor Sharpaevka, Yanovskaya volost, Donetsk Okrug, Don Host Oblast, Russia
- Died: November 27, 1934 (aged 52); Sevastopol, Soviet Union
- Education: St. Petersburg Academy of Arts
- Style: Battle painting
- Movement: Realism

Mitrofan Borisovich Grekov (Russian: Митрофан Борисович Греков; born: Mitrofan Pavlovich Martyshchenko; 15 June [O.S. 3 June], 1882 – November 27, 1934) was a Russian and Soviet painter, considered to be the "father of Soviet battle painting".

== Biography ==
Born in a Cossack family, at the age of 15, he went to study painting, first at the Odesa Art School (with Kiriyak Kostandi), then 5 years later, after successfully passing the exams, he ended up at the St. Petersburg Academy of Arts, where he studied with Ilya Repin and Franz Roubaud. During his studies, he worked on Roubaud's panoramas "Defense of Sevastopol" and "Battle of Borodino".

In 1911, for the competitive work "Oxen in the Plow" he was awarded the title of artist. From 1912 he served in the Life Guards Ataman Regiment.

During the First World War he fought for three years at the front, from where he made many sketches. As a result of a serious injury and health problems, he was demobilized in 1917.

During the Russian Civil War, he volunteered for the Red Army in 1920. In the 1920s, he painted the First Cavalry Army of Budyonny and created a series of battle paintings dedicated to the victories of the Reds over the Whites.

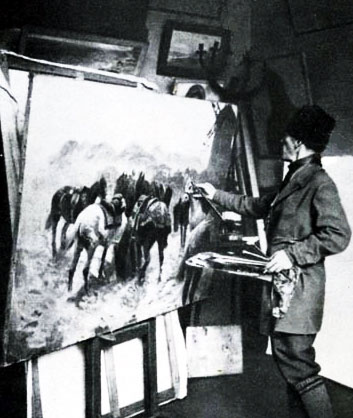
Grekov painting in his studio

In 1927, the first personal exhibition of Mitrofan Grekov was held in Novocherkassk.

In 1930 he became a member of the Association of Artists of Revolutionary Russia (AHRR). In 1931 he moved to Moscow.

He died on November 27, 1934, in Sevastopol, working on the Perekop panorama. He was buried in Moscow at the Novodevichy Cemetery.

== Memory ==
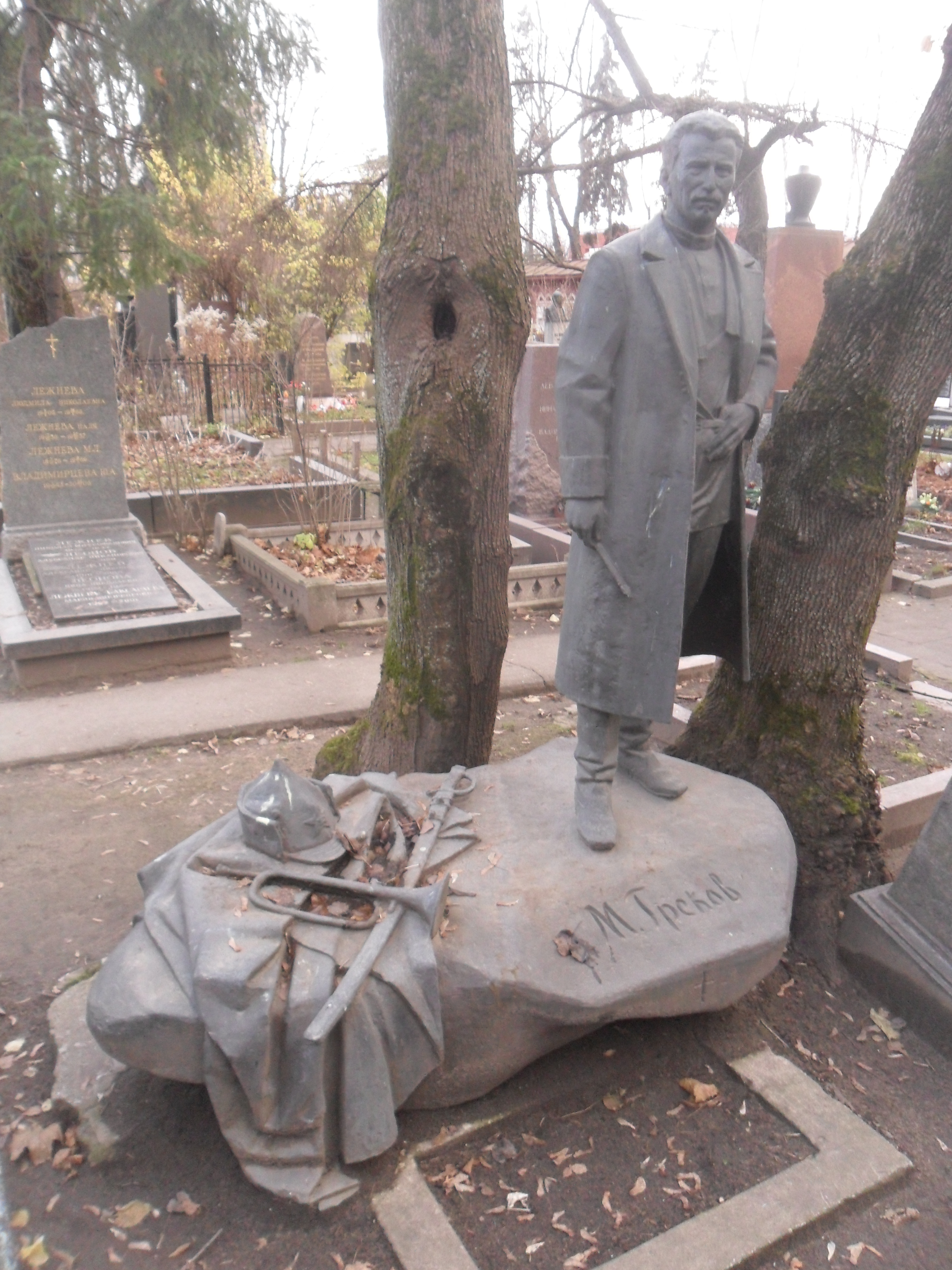
Grave of Mitrofan Grekov at the Novodevichy Cemetery

- Grekov Odesa Art School, the Rostov art school, and the Grekov Studio of War Artists in Moscow (working since 1934) are named after M. B. Grekov.
- The House-Museum of Mitrofan Grekov operates in Novocherkassk.
- The M. B. Grekov Medal was established in 1966 by the Ministry of Culture of the USSR, the Union of Artists of the USSR and the GPU of the SA and the Navy for the best works of fine art on a military-patriotic theme. From 1967 to 1991, one gold and three silver medals were awarded to them on Victory Day.
- Grekova street in Minsk.
- The artist's works are kept in the collections of the House-Museum, the State Tretyakov Gallery, etc

== Gallery ==
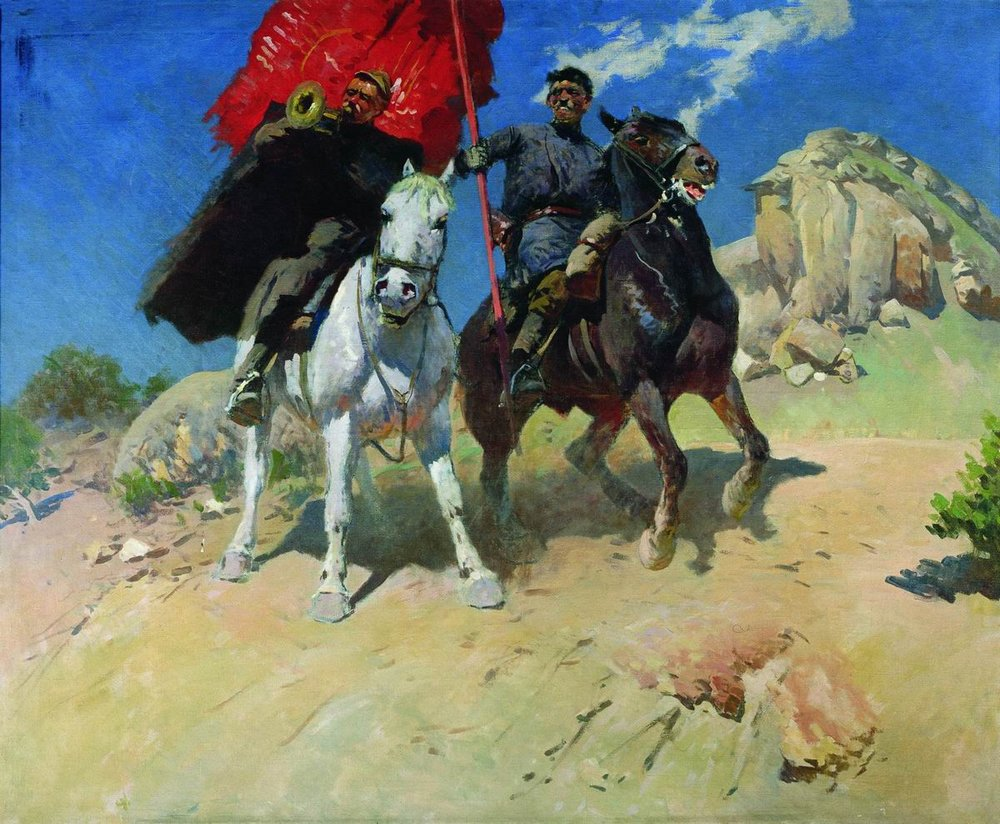

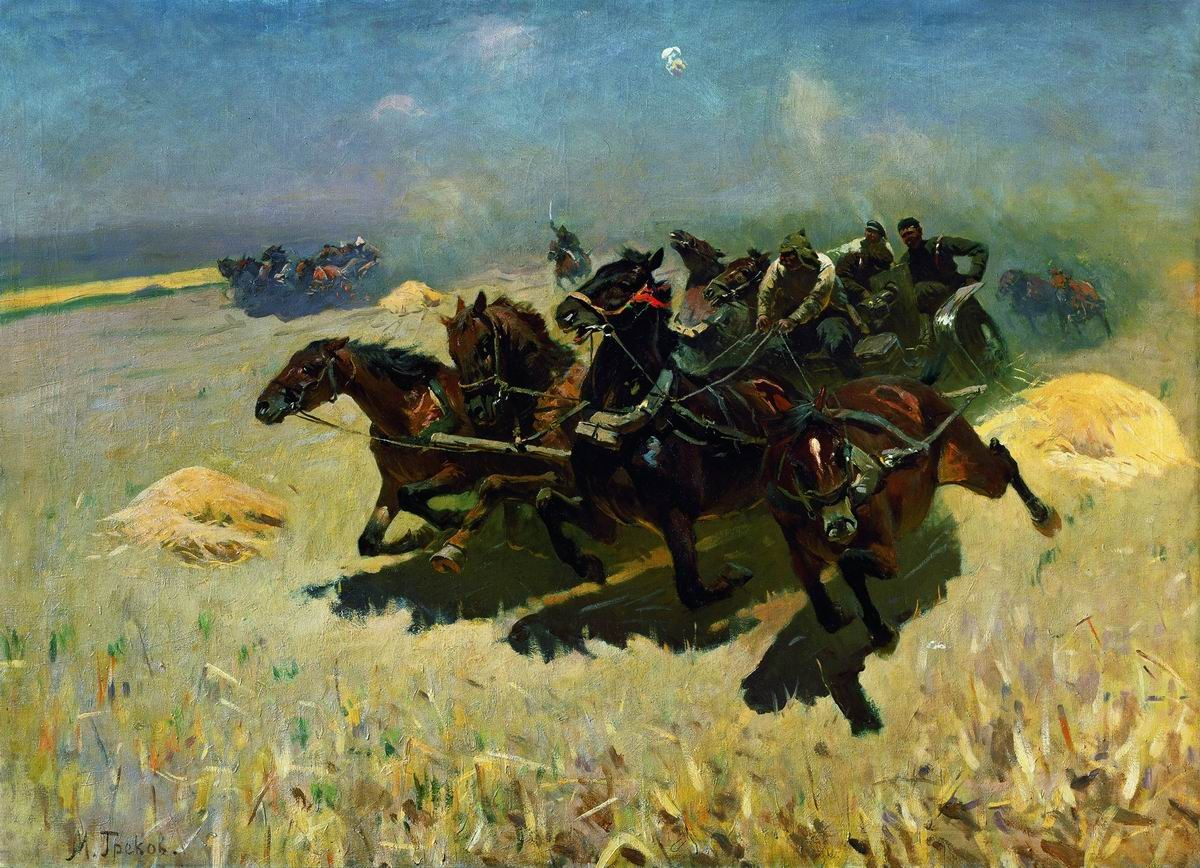

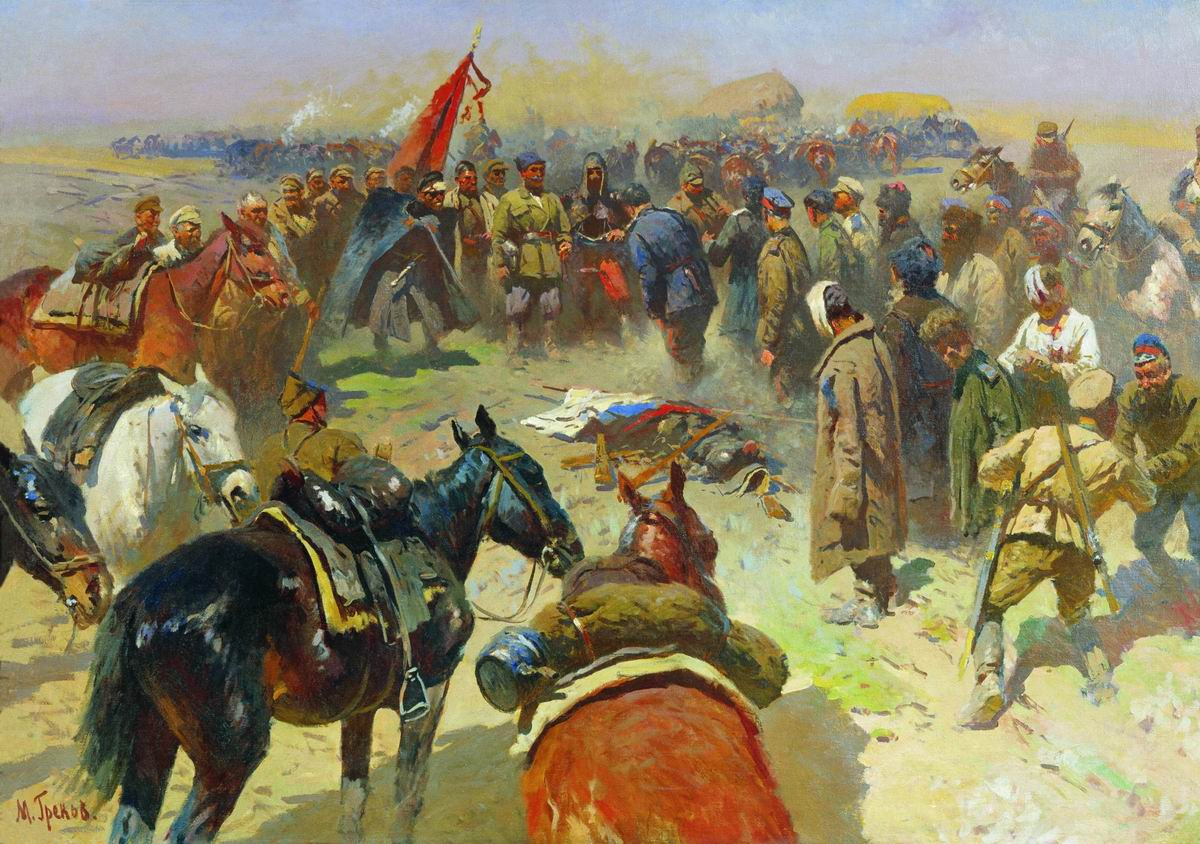

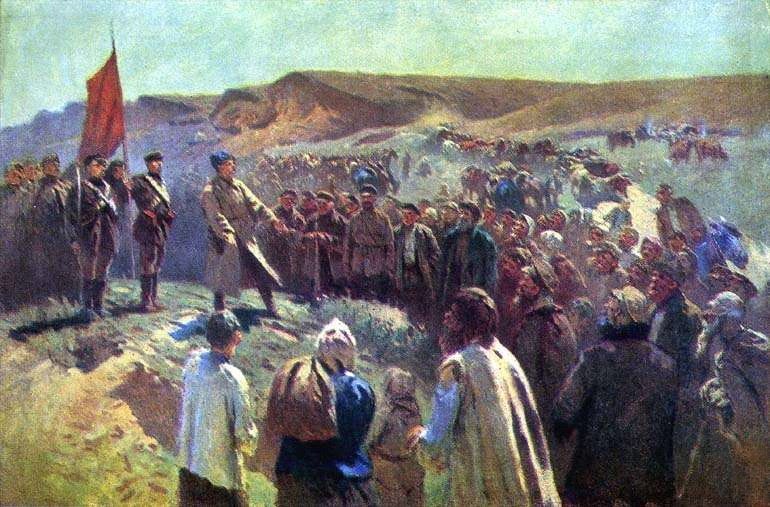

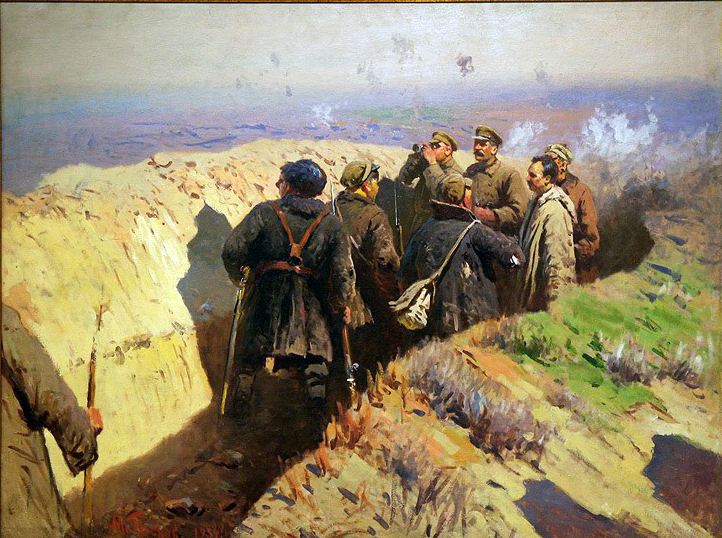

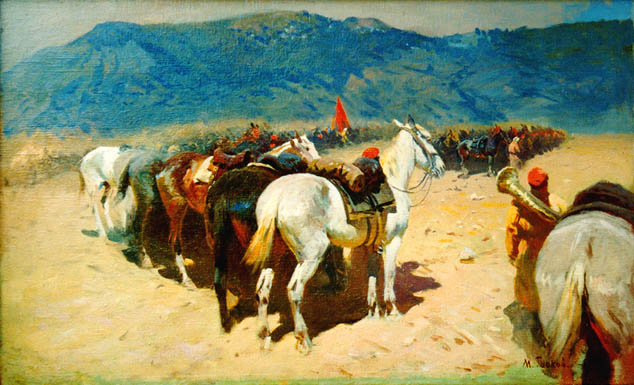

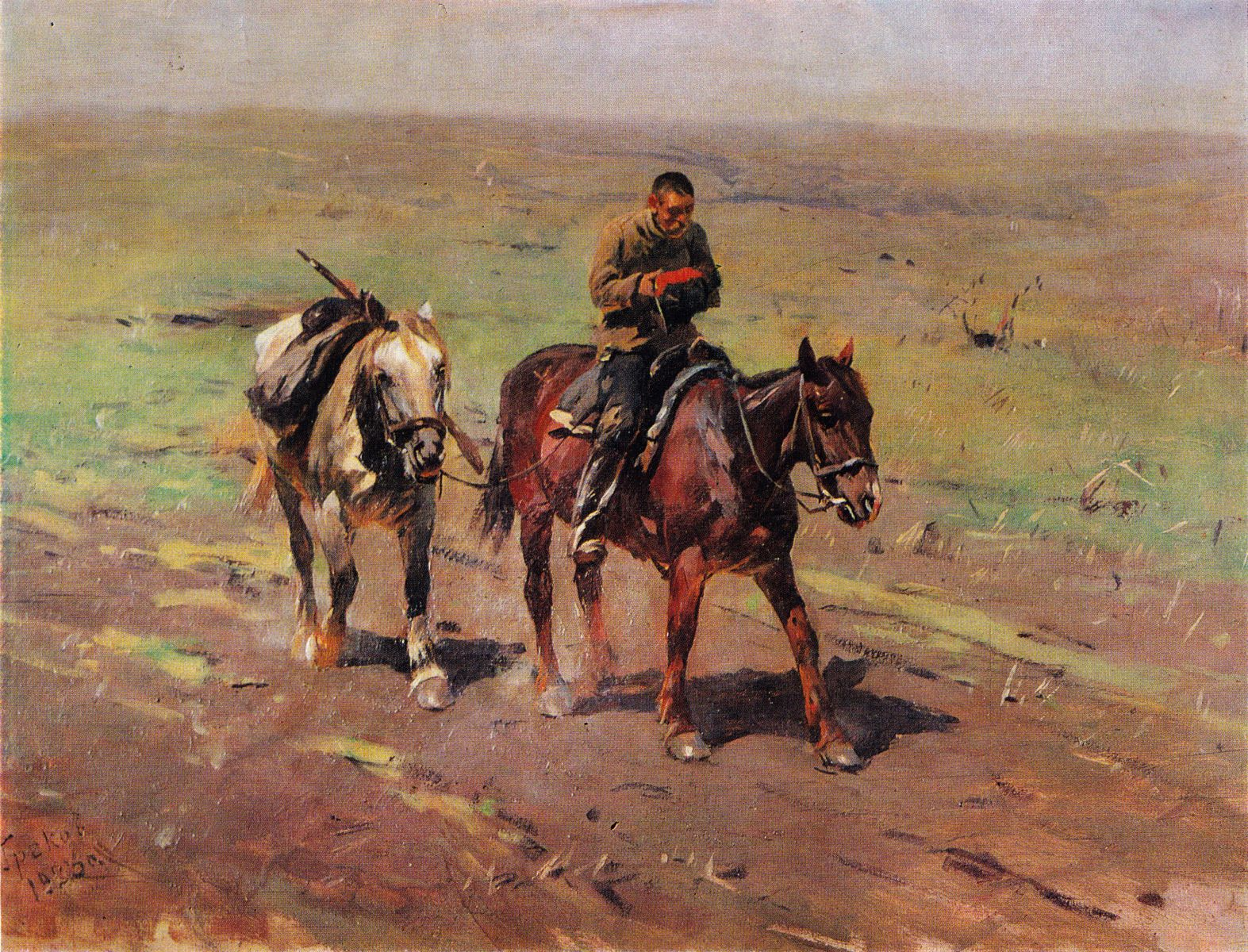

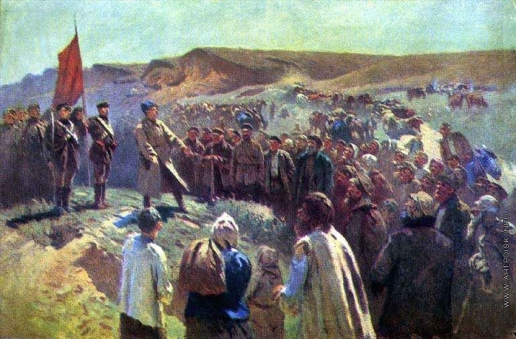
