= Nikolay Dubovskoy =

Russian landscape painter

- Николай Никанорович Дубовской
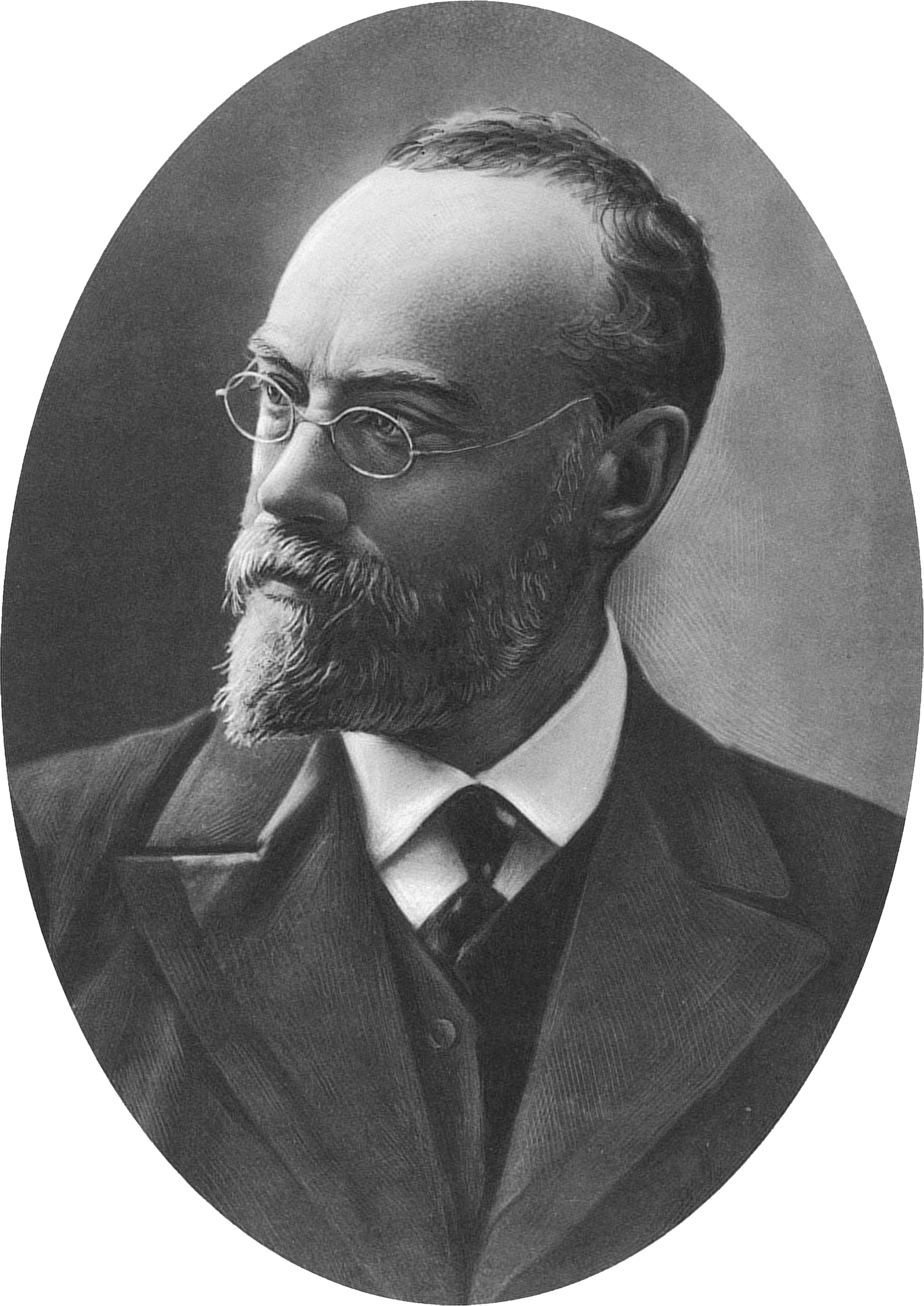
- Nikolay Dubovskoy (late 1880s)
- Born: December 5, 1859; Novocherkassk
- Died: February 28, 1918 (aged 58); Saint Petersburg
- Education: Member Academy of Arts (1898); Full Member Academy of Arts (1900)
- Alma mater: Imperial Academy of Arts (1881)
- Known for: Painting

Nikolay Nikanorovich Dubovskoy (Russian: Николай Никанорович Дубовской; 17 December 1859, Novocherkassk — 28 February 1918, Saint Petersburg) was a Russian landscape painter, associated with the Peredvizhniki. Together with Isaac Levitan, he helped create what came to be known as the "Landscape of Mood".

== Biography ==
His father was a Troop Sergeant in the Don Cossacks. He displayed artistic talent at an early age; copying illustrations from Niva and other popular magazines. His uncle, a local artist named A.V. Pyshkin, taught him how to draw from memory. His father insisted that he follow family tradition, however, and enrolled him in the Vladimir Kiev Cadet Corps in 1870. Once there, his instructors noticed that he spent all of his free time drawing and advised his father to give him an art education instead.

In 1877, after receiving his father's permission, he began auditing classes at the Imperial Academy of Arts, then became a student of the landscape painter Mikhail Clodt. Upon graduating in 1881, he was apparently displeased with his instruction at the academy and refused to participate in the customary competition for a gold medal. He chose to exhibit at the Imperial Society for the Encouragement of the Arts instead, winning several medals and achieving his first public recognition. In 1884 his painting, "Winter" was acquired by the Tretyakov Gallery. Following that, he began to exhibit regularly with the Peredvizhniki and became a member in 1886.

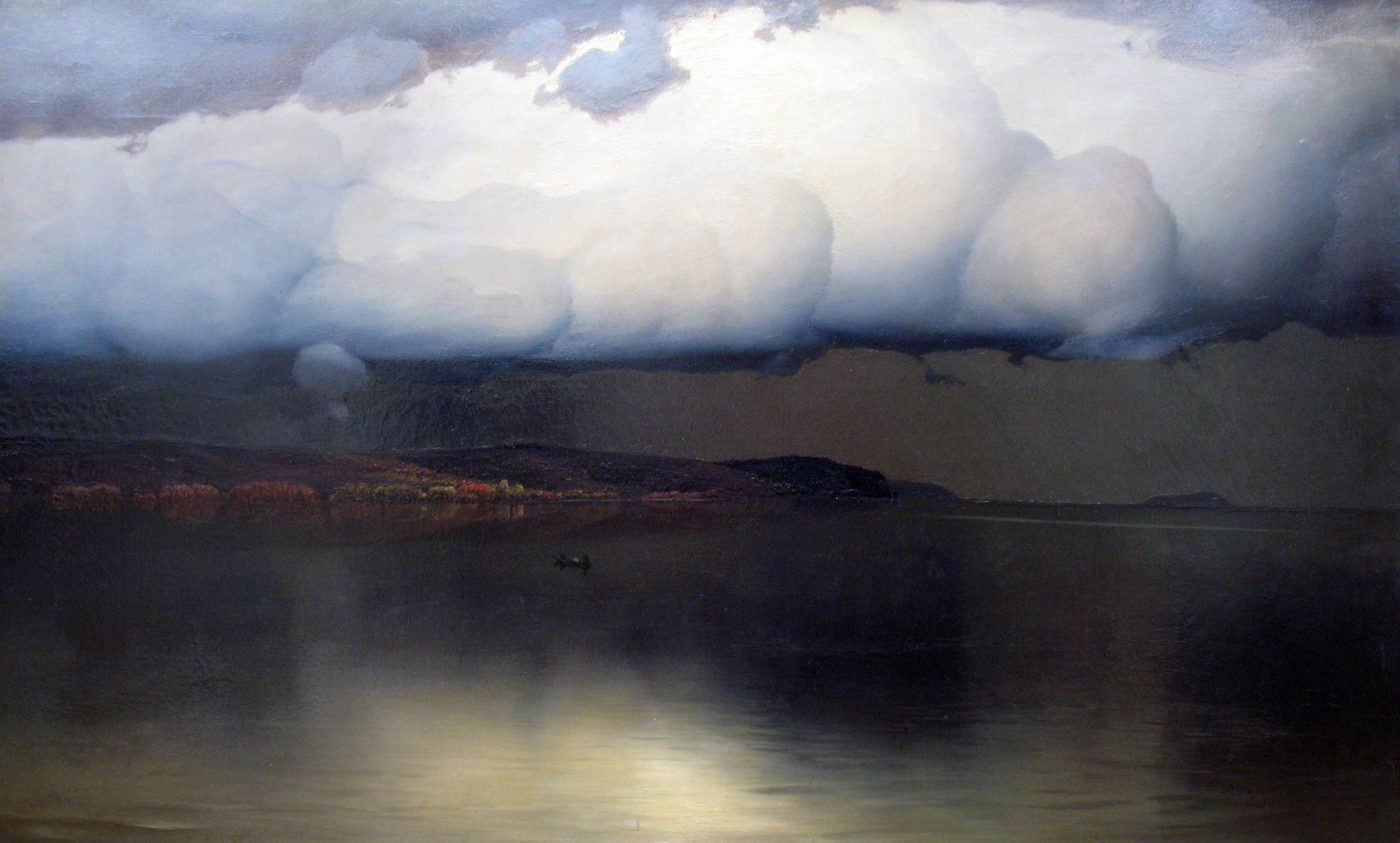
"Hushing" (Calm Before the Storm)

In 1887, Ilya Repin invited him to stay at his estate in Siversky, where he painted en plein air and came under Repin's influence. The year 1888 found him touring the Black Sea coast in Georgia on horseback with his friend, Nikolai Yaroshenko. In 1890, his painting "Притихло" ("hushing" or "silencing", before the storm) was purchased by Tsar Alexander III for his collection at the Winter Palace.

From 1890 to 1900, he travelled extensively, visiting the Azov Sea, the Volga Region and the Caucasus as well as locations abroad, ranging from Turkey to France and Italy to Germany. In 1897, upon the dismissal of Arkhip Kuindzhi, he was offered a position as Professor of Landscape Painting at the Imperial Academy, but refused the offer.

After his friend Yaroshenko's death in 1898, he became one of the leaders of the Peredvizhniki and was known as a moderating force when the newer members had disagreements with the older ones. During this period, he was increasingly influenced by French Impressionism. Later in 1898, despite his refusal to accept a position there, he was named an "Academician" by the Imperial Academy and became a full member in 1900.

He began teaching there in 1908 and, following the death of Alexander Kiselyov in 1911, became head of the landscape painting workshop. An effort to build a special museum for his works had to be halted due to the outbreak of World War I and was never resumed. In 1915, he became a member of the academy's governing council. During this time, he also hosted a Tuesday "Salon", which was attended by notable figures from the scientific community, as well as by artists, writers and musicians. Ivan Pavlov became a close friend.

In 1918, he died of heart failure and Pavlov delivered one of the funeral orations. During the Soviet era, except for one exhibition in 1938, he was largely forgotten. A street in Novocherkassk was later named in his honor.

== Other selected paintings ==
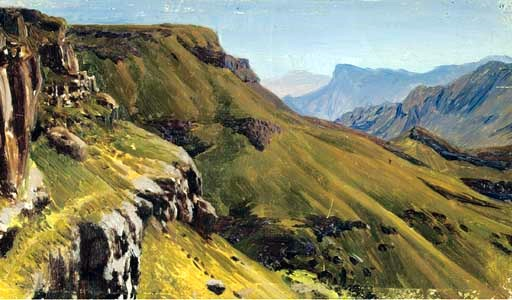
Mountainous Terrain

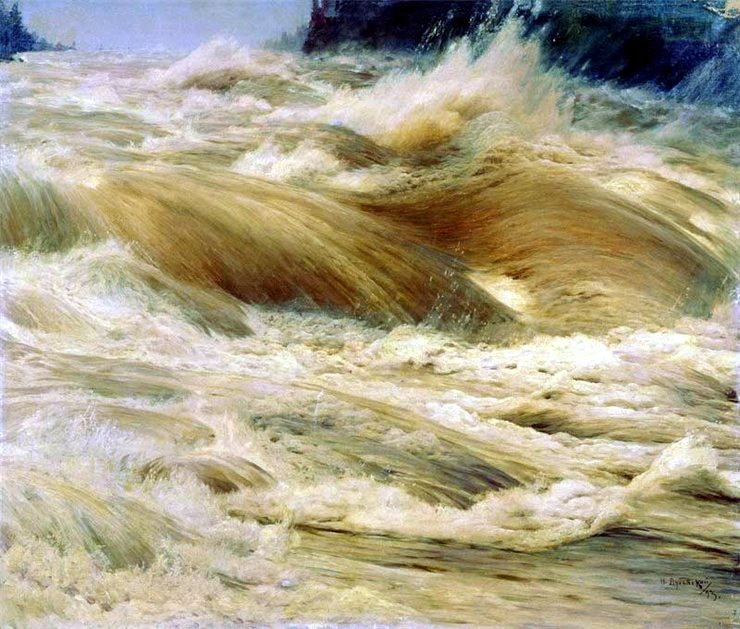
The Waterfall at Imatra

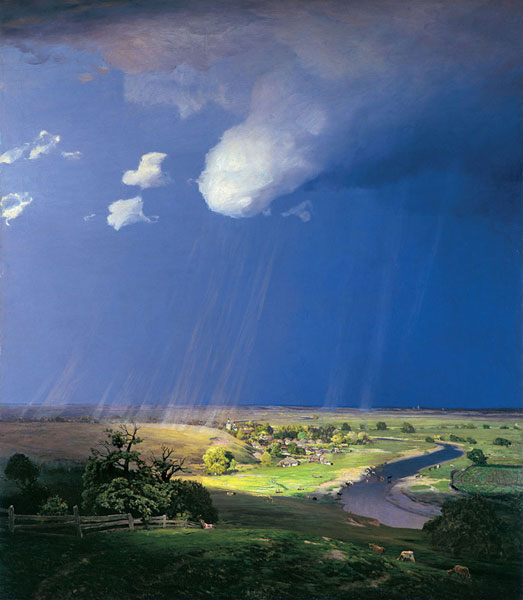
Homeland

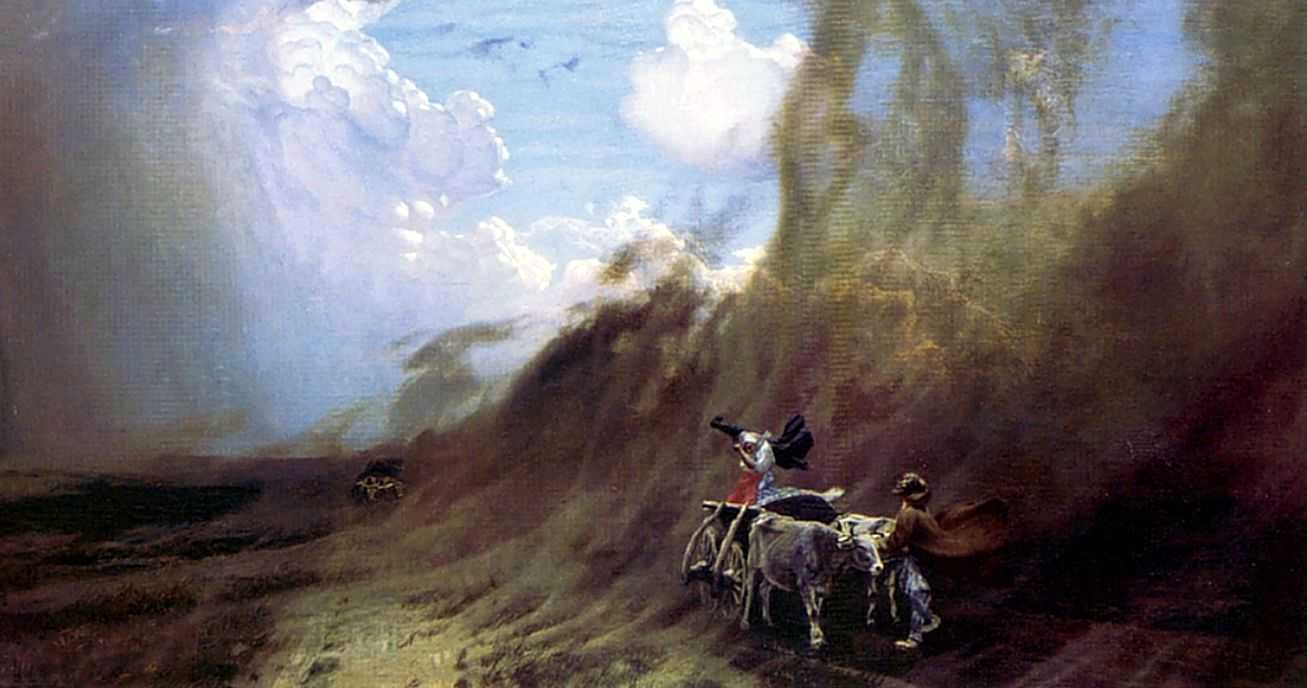
Sandstorm on the Steppes
