= Ataman Palace =

Building in Novocherkassk, Russia

Coordinates: 47.2436°N 40.0605°E

- Атаманский дворец
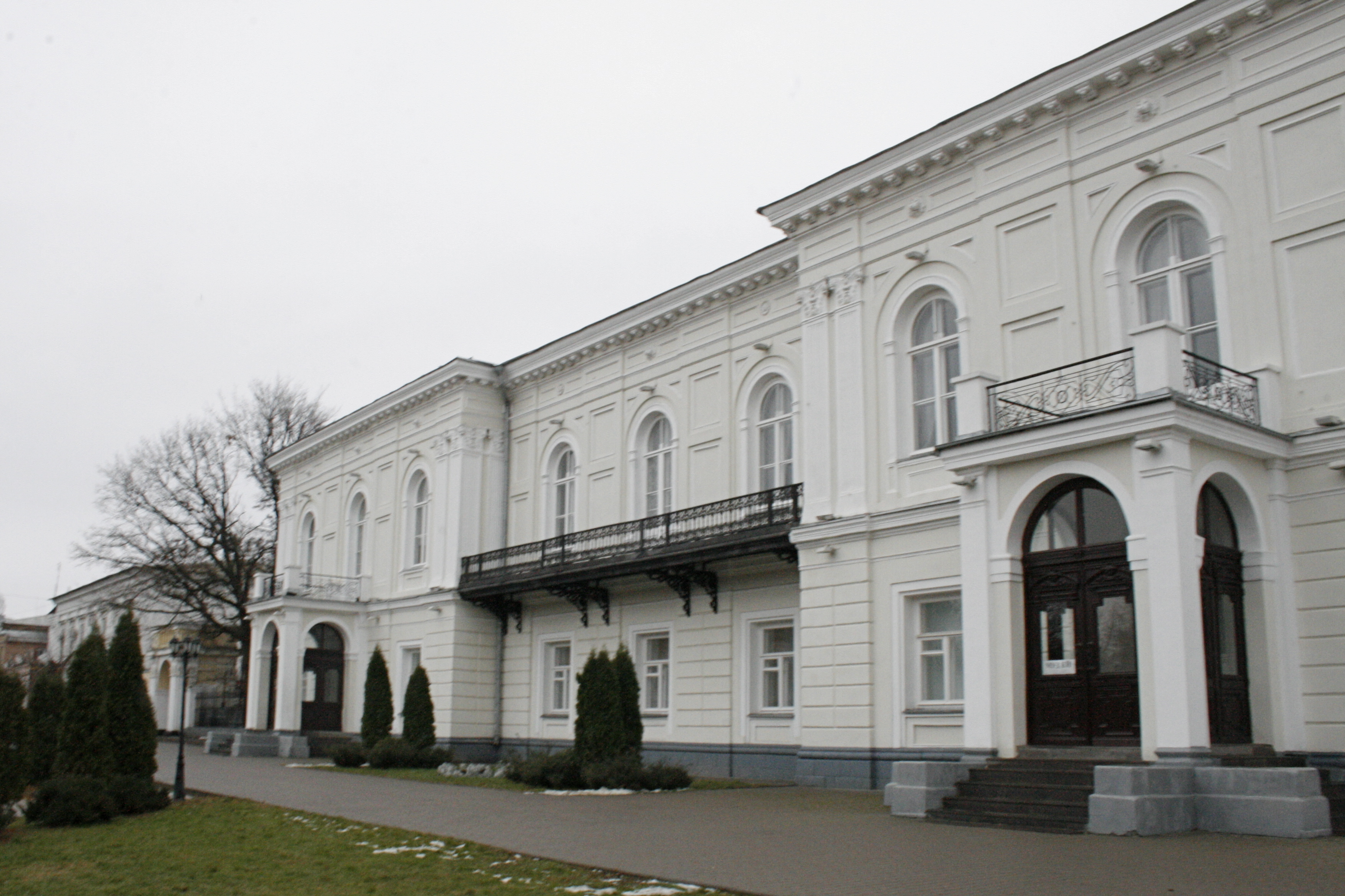
- Established: 1863
- Location: Novocherkassk, Rostov Oblast, Russia.
- Type: Palace

The Ataman Palace (Russian: Атаманский дворец) is an architectural monument in the city of Novocherkassk, Rostov Oblast, Russia, that was built in 1863. It was the official residence of the Ataman of Don Host Oblast and was visited by Alexander II, Alexander III and Nicholas II. It is also officially declared as an object of cultural heritage of Russia.

== History ==
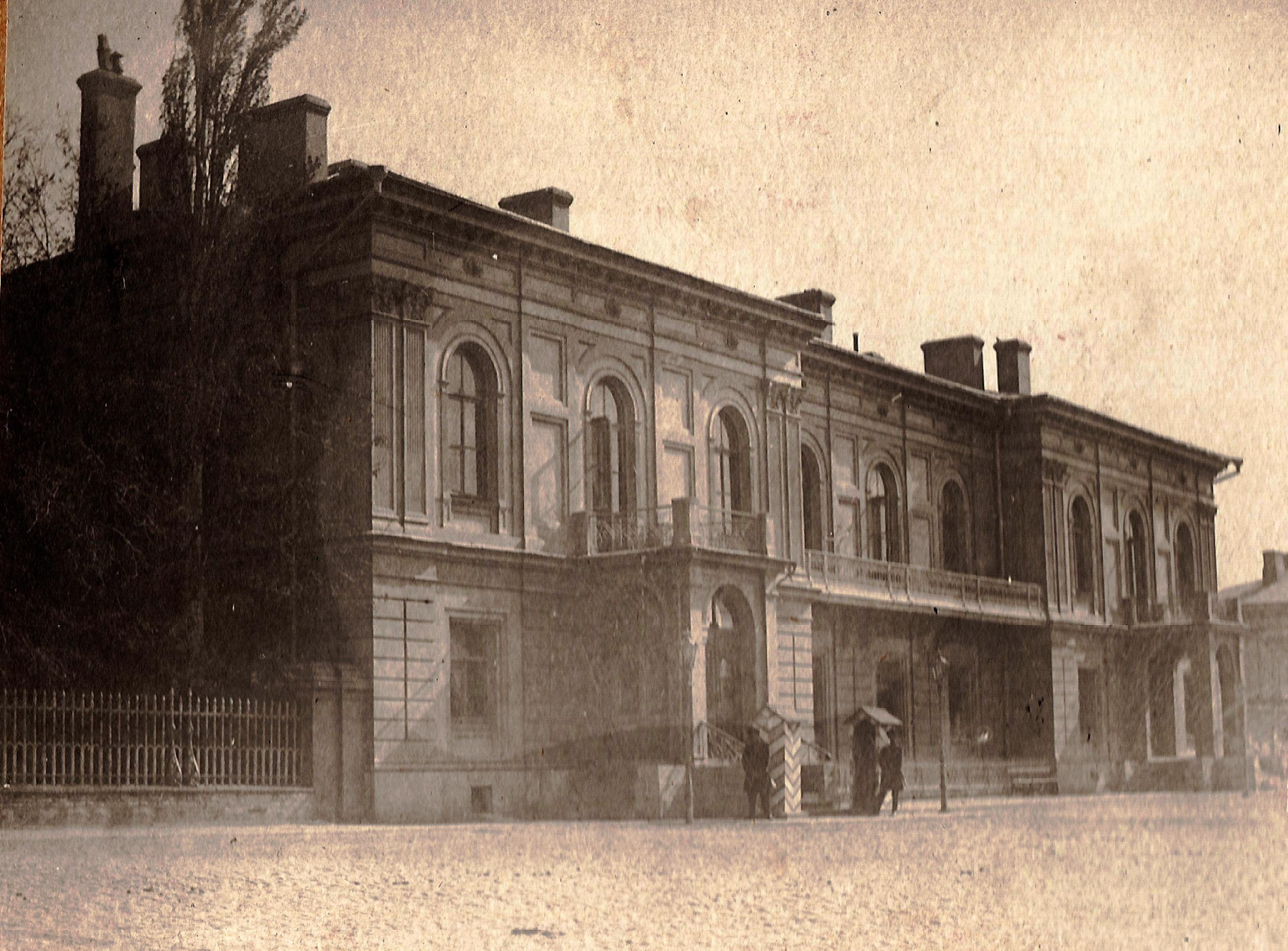
The Ataman Palace, c. 1905

The Ataman Palace was being built from 1860 to 1863 on the project of architect Ivan Valprede. Soon it was decided that the Palace should serve as the residence not only of the Don Ataman, but of the Russian Emperor as well, if he came to Novocherkassk. In 1867, after the failed assassination attempt of Alexander II, a House Church of Saint Simeon of Persia was constructed at the palace.

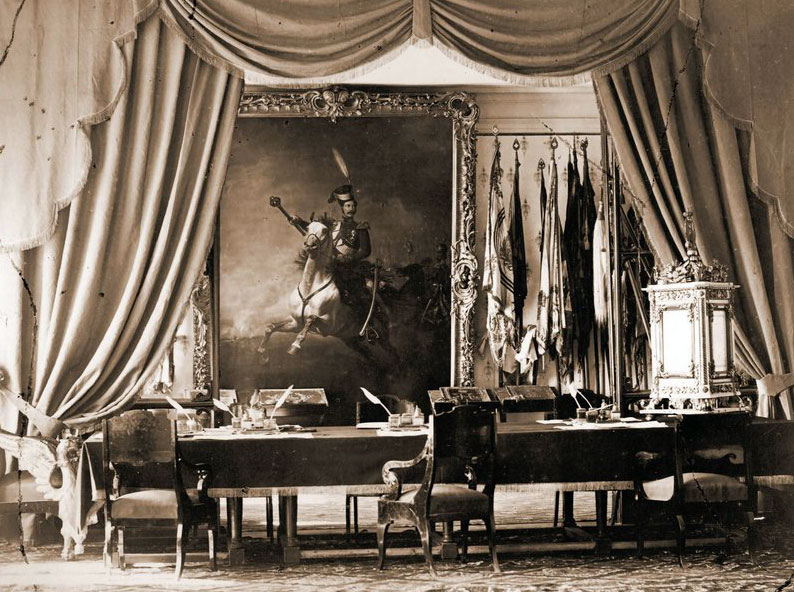
Interior of the Ataman Palace

During Russian Civil War, the Ataman Palace was the headquarters of the leaders of White Movement on the Don. In 1927, it housed District Executive Committee, a local administration office. On June 30, 1942, when Novocherkassk was occupied by the Wehrmacht, in the Ataman Palace was accommodated German military occupation office.

In 1998, the building was renovated and later was given to the Museum of Don Cossacks.

== Architecture ==
The facade of the place is designed in Classicist style. The twin pilasters at the ends of the corners of the risalite, a balcony decorated with a cast grid, entrances made in the form of open portals ― all of that give the building the look of a palace. Inside there are high vaulted ceremonial halls, cast-iron front staircase of made of thin figure molding.
