= Monplaisir =

Monplaisir may refer to:

- Monplaisir Palace, Peterhof, Russia
- Monplaisir Garden, Peterhof, Russia
- Monplaisir, Lyon, a district in Lyon, France
- Monplaisir (surname)
- Monplaisir, a former plantation house located in the present-day McDonoghville section of Gretna, Louisiana.

== See also ==
- Château de Mon Plaisir, Sir Seewoosagur Ramgoolam Botanical Garden, Mauritius
