= Peter the Great Interrogating the Tsarevich Alexei Petrovich at Peterhof =

Painting by Russian painter Nikolai Ge

Peter the Great Interrogating the Tsarevich Alexei Petrovich
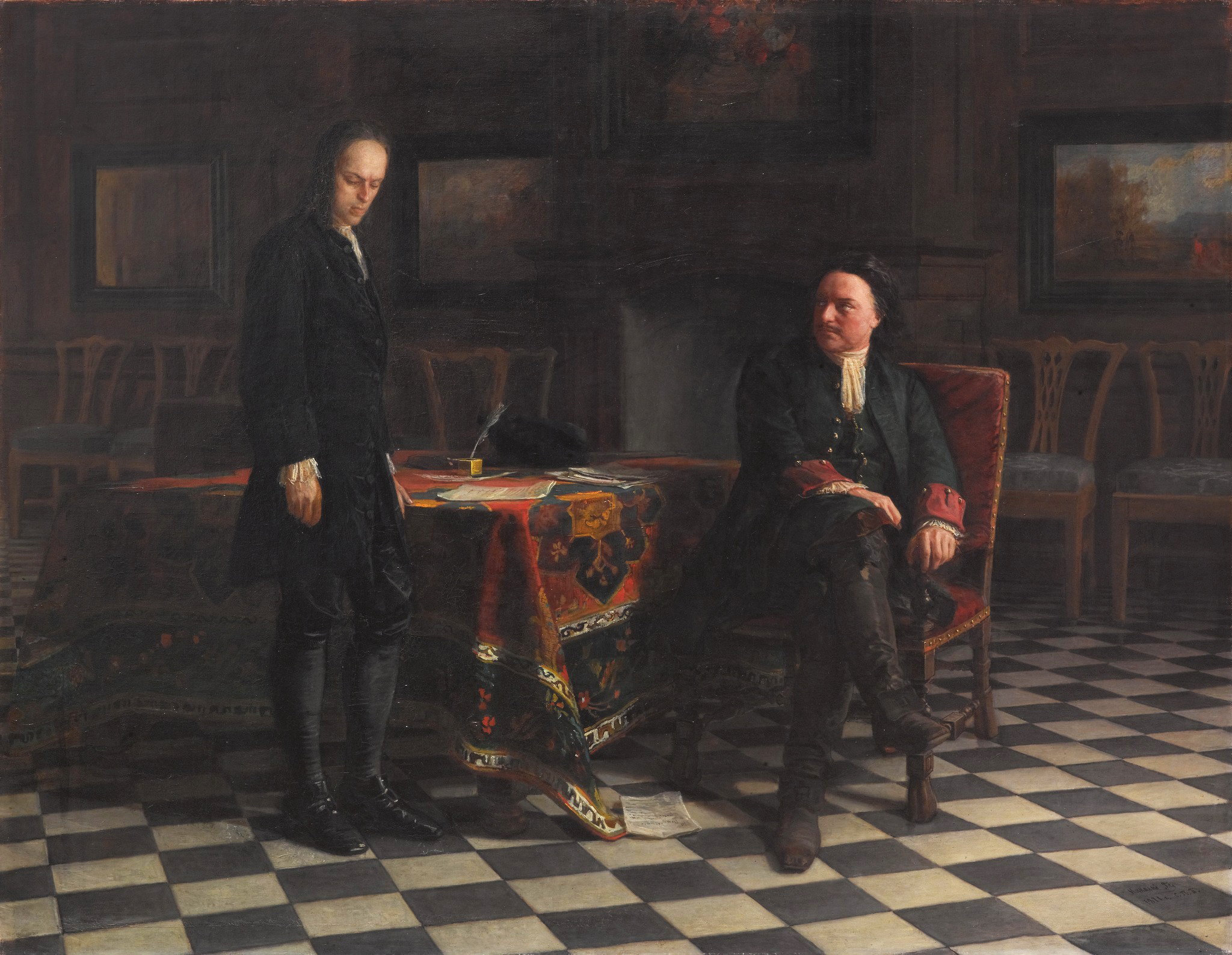
- Artist: Nikolai Ge
- Year: 1871
- Medium: Oil on canvas
- Dimensions: 135,7 cm × 173 cm (534 in × 68 in)
- Location: State Tretyakov Gallery, Moscow

The painting Peter the Great Interrogating the Tsarevich Alexei Petrovich at Peterhof was created by the Russian artist Nikolai Ge (1831–1894) and completed in 1871. The painting is stored in the State Tretyakov Gallery in Moscow (Inventory 2630). The dimensions of the painting are 135.7 cm by 173 cm (according to other data, 134.8 cm by 172.7 cm). Ge's work offers a psychological interpretation of a historical drama set in 1718. The painting depicts Peter I and his son Alexei Petrovich, who has been accused of preparing to seize power, in the interior of the Monplaisir Palace in Peterhof. Before pronouncing sentence, Peter I gazes into his son's eyes, still hoping to discern signs of remorse.

The painting was created by Ge for the inaugural exhibition of the Society for Travelling Art Exhibitions (Peredvizhniki), which opened in St Petersburg in November 1871. In particular, the artist's choice of theme was motivated by the approaching 200th anniversary of Peter the Great (1672–1725). Prior to the exhibition, the canvas was purchased from the artist by Pavel Tretyakov. Nikolai Ge painted several copies of the painting, one of which was purchased by Alexander II and is now part of the collection of the State Russian Museum.

Writer and critic Mikhail Saltykov-Shchedrin described the heroes of the canvas as follows: "Anyone who has seen these two simple, not at all spectacularly staged figures will have to admit that he has witnessed one of those amazing dramas that will never be erased from memory." Art critic Vladimir Stasov considered Ge's painting to be one of the best works in the 1st Travelling Exhibition, writing: "None of Mr Ge's previous paintings bore such a stamp of maturity and skill as this one." Art historian Alla Vereshchagina noted that the painting Peter the Great Interrogating the Tsarevich Alexei Petrovich at Peterhof was "the most important milestone" in the development of a new direction in Russian historical painting of the 1870s, associated with the artistic interpretation of the eminent man and his place in history.

== History ==
=== Background and creation ===
By the beginning of 1870, Nikolai Ge had returned to Russia from Italy, where he had resided and worked between 1857 and 1863 and again between 1864 and 1869. His final relocation occurred in May 1870, when he and his family settled on Vasilyevsky Island in St Petersburg. During this period, Ge became acquainted with a number of progressive artists and writers, and subsequently became one of the founders of the Society for Travelling Art Exhibitions. In his oeuvre, subjects related to the Russian history of the 18th and 19th centuries began to emerge. One of the earliest works on this theme was the painting Peter I and the Tsarevich Alexei. The plot associated with Peter I was relevant in connection with the approaching 200th anniversary of his birth.

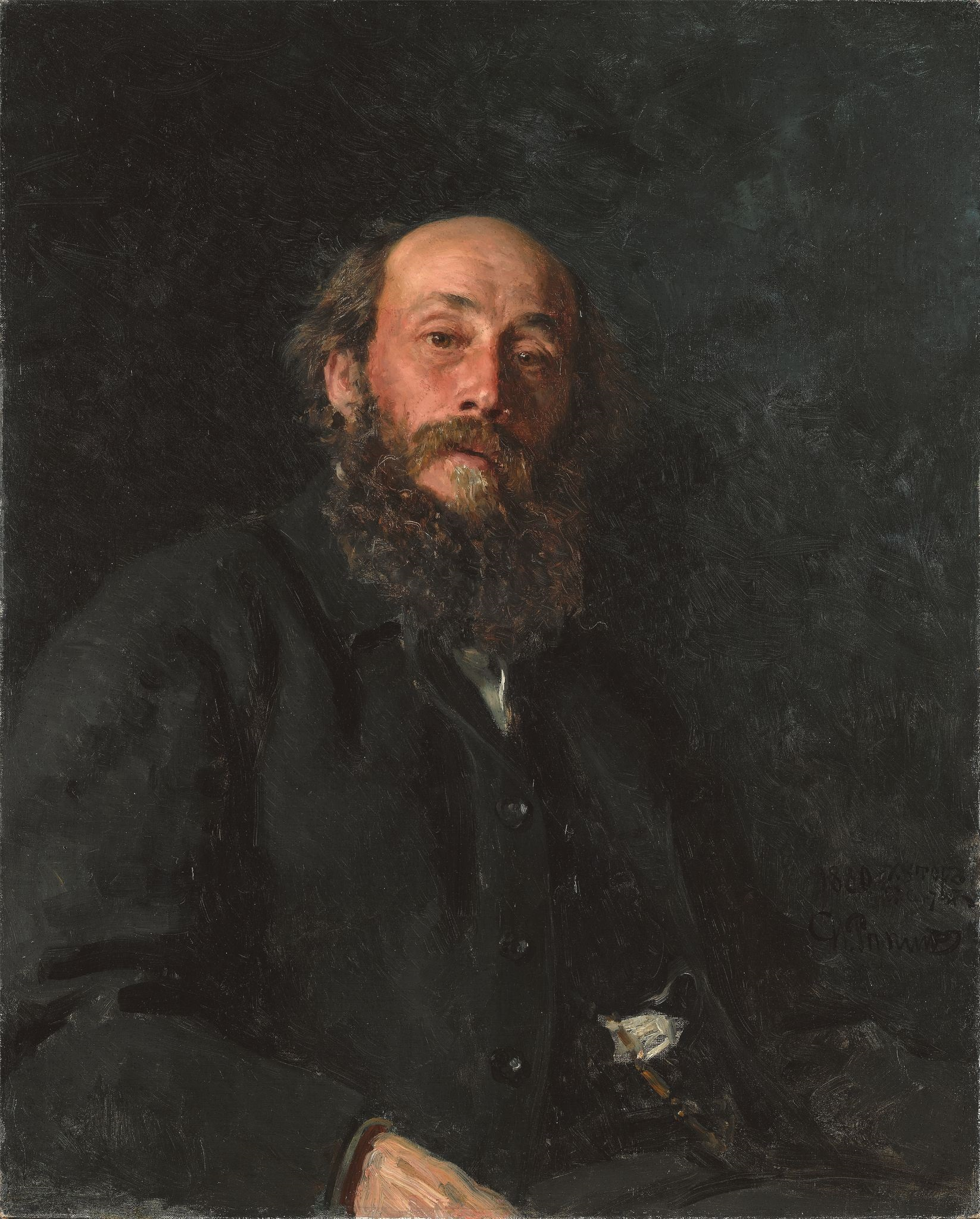
I.Y. Repin. Portrait of Artist N.N. Ge (1880, State Tretyakov Gallery)

Ge himself wrote in his memoirs: "Ten years of living in Italy had their effect on me, and I returned from there a perfect Italian, seeing everything in Russia in a new light. I felt in everything and everywhere the influence and trace of the Petrine reform. This feeling was so strong that I involuntarily became fascinated with Peter, and it was under the influence of this fascination that I conceived my painting Peter I and the Tsarevich Alexei." It is probable that the choice of theme was influenced by Ge's close contact with the historian and publicist Nikolai Kostomarov. The initial sketch for the future canvas was made in 1870, and the work itself was completed in 1871.

Some researchers have postulated that the plot of the work may have been influenced by the fascination of the artist, Ge, with the work of the French painter Paul Delaroche. This fascination was also evident in the works of other Russian artists of the period, including Vyacheslav Schwarz, Konstantin Flavitsky, Valery Jacobi and Karlis Huns, who were interested in "bloody episodes of court life, in the spectacular exposure of facts hidden by official historiography". Furthermore, the work of Vyacheslav Schwarz, Ivan the Terrible by the body of his son, who he has murdered, is sometimes considered a predecessor to "Peter and Alexei." There are two works, created in the 1860s - charcoal and chalk drawing on cardboard that was completed in 1861 (held in the State Russian Museum), and an oil painting on canvas, created in 1864 (held in the State Tretyakov Gallery).

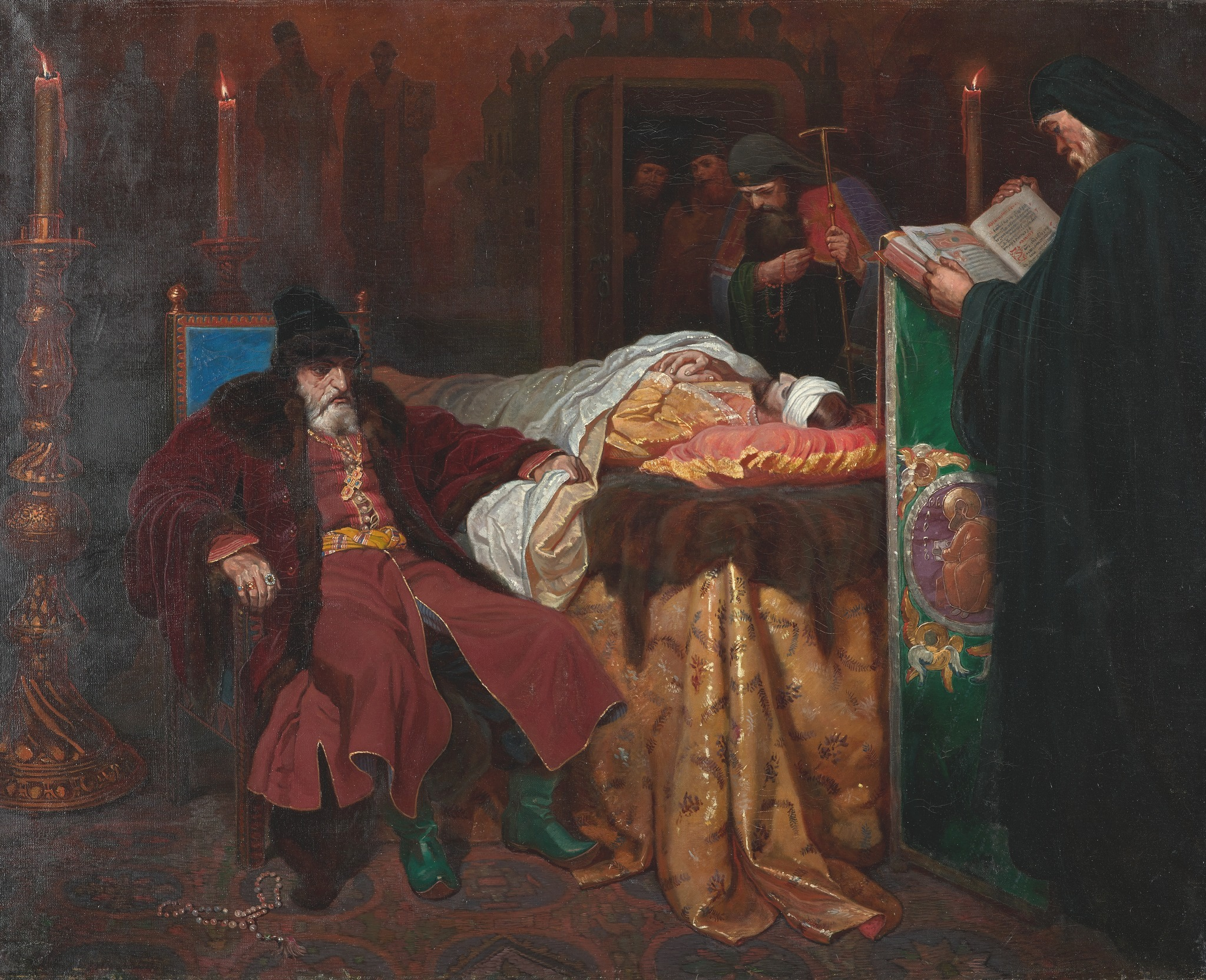
Vyacheslav Schwarz. Ivan the Terrible by the body of his son, who he has murdered (1864, State Tretyakov Gallery)

As Ge worked on the painting, he conducted research into historical documents pertaining to the activities of Peter the Great. It is probable that these documents include those published by historian Nikolay Ustryalov in the sixth volume of The History of Peter the Great's Reign, published in 1859. Apparently, Ge discussed the matter with his acquaintances and friends, in particular with Nikolai Kostomarov. Consequently, the initial idealisation of Peter the Great's personality was supplanted by a more realistic appraisal, contingent upon an understanding of the cruelty and affliction that compensated for the triumphs of Peter's reforms. The artist described this situation this way: "At the time of writing the painting Peter I and the Tsarevich Alexei, I had sympathy for Peter, but then, having studied many documents, I saw that there could be no sympathy. I stirred up in myself sympathy for Peter, saying that he put public interests above fatherly feelings, and this justified his cruelty, but killed the ideal."

By the early 1870s, the Russian public had become sufficiently aware of the "case of the Tsarevich Alexei", although a couple of decades earlier this episode could be more accurately described as a "historical mishap", of which it was not customary to speak. In the late 1850s, this "case" came to the centre of attention in connection with publications in the Polar Star almanac, published by Alexander Herzen and Nikolay Ogarev. In particular, the publication included documents that contradicted the official version of Tsarevich Alexei's death, which stated that he died in the Peter and Paul Fortress "out of grief." The documents contained information indicating that he was strangled by order of Peter the Great. However, the authenticity of one of the published letters was later questioned. Famous historians and publicists such as Nikolai Ustryalov, Nikolai Kostomarov, Mikhail Pogodin, Sergey Solovyov, Mikhail Semevsky, Pyotr Pekarsky, Nikolay Dobrolyubov, and others were involved in the extensive debate that arose following the release of these publications. According to historian and writer Natan Eidelman, "the controversy surrounding the case of Tsarevich Alexei in the 1858-1860s was one of the most contemporary topics". In this sense, the painting which Nikolai Ge was working on "seemed to summarise the old controversies and give rise to new ones". Furthermore, the painting could be regarded as a tribute to Alexander Herzen, who died on 21 January 1870.

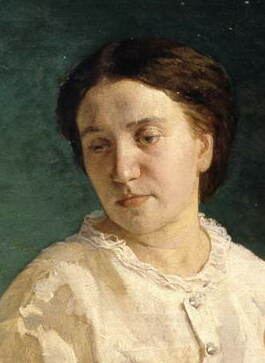
Anna Petrovna Ge (fragment of the painting by N. N. Ge Portrait of A. P. Ge with Children, 1861–1866, State Russian Museum)

While working on the painting, Ge thoroughly studied the iconography of Peter the Great available to him. According to critic Vladimir Stasov, Ge "studied Peter's face and figure in the Hermitage from all the engraved and oil-painted portraits of him". It is also known that the artist incorporated elements of Peter's portrait from his wife, Anna Petrovna Ge, née Zabela (Zabello). According to the peredvizhnik artist Grigory Myasoedov, "in his wife, he [Ge], despite the fact that she was far from beautiful, saw all the perfections: from her he painted Magdalene, and Peter the Great, and many others". Stasov reported that Ge also studied all the surviving portraits of Alexei Petrovich, and as a model for him used "one of his acquaintances, a small official of the Ministry of Finance, in whose sickly, emaciated face and figure he found some resemblance to the portraits of Tsarevich Alexei." Stasov also provided the name of this official, which was Nikolai Grigorievich Zaichnevsky. Nikolai Zaichnevsky was the brother of the revolutionary nationalist Pyotr Zaichnevsky.

In order to depict the scene in the interior of the Monplaisir Palace, Ge specially visited Peterhof, from where, in his own words, "in his mind, in his memory, he brought back the whole background of the painting Peter and Alexei, with the fireplace, with cornices, with four paintings of the Dutch school, with chairs, with the floor and lighting". At the same time, Ge claimed that one visit to the Montplaisir was enough for him: "And I was only in that room once, and I was deliberately only there once, so as not to break the impression I had formed". Some details of Ge's stay in Peterhof are known from the words of the philosopher Vladimir Lesevich, as set out in the book by Vladimir Stasov: during his visit to the palace, the artist took a long look at the room, as well as the authentic dressing gown and cap of Peter the Great, and the old guard, a retired soldier, who accompanied him, stated, that it was only the second occasion on which he had observed such meticulous examination of these items. The first occasion was when the Emperor Nicholas I had done so.

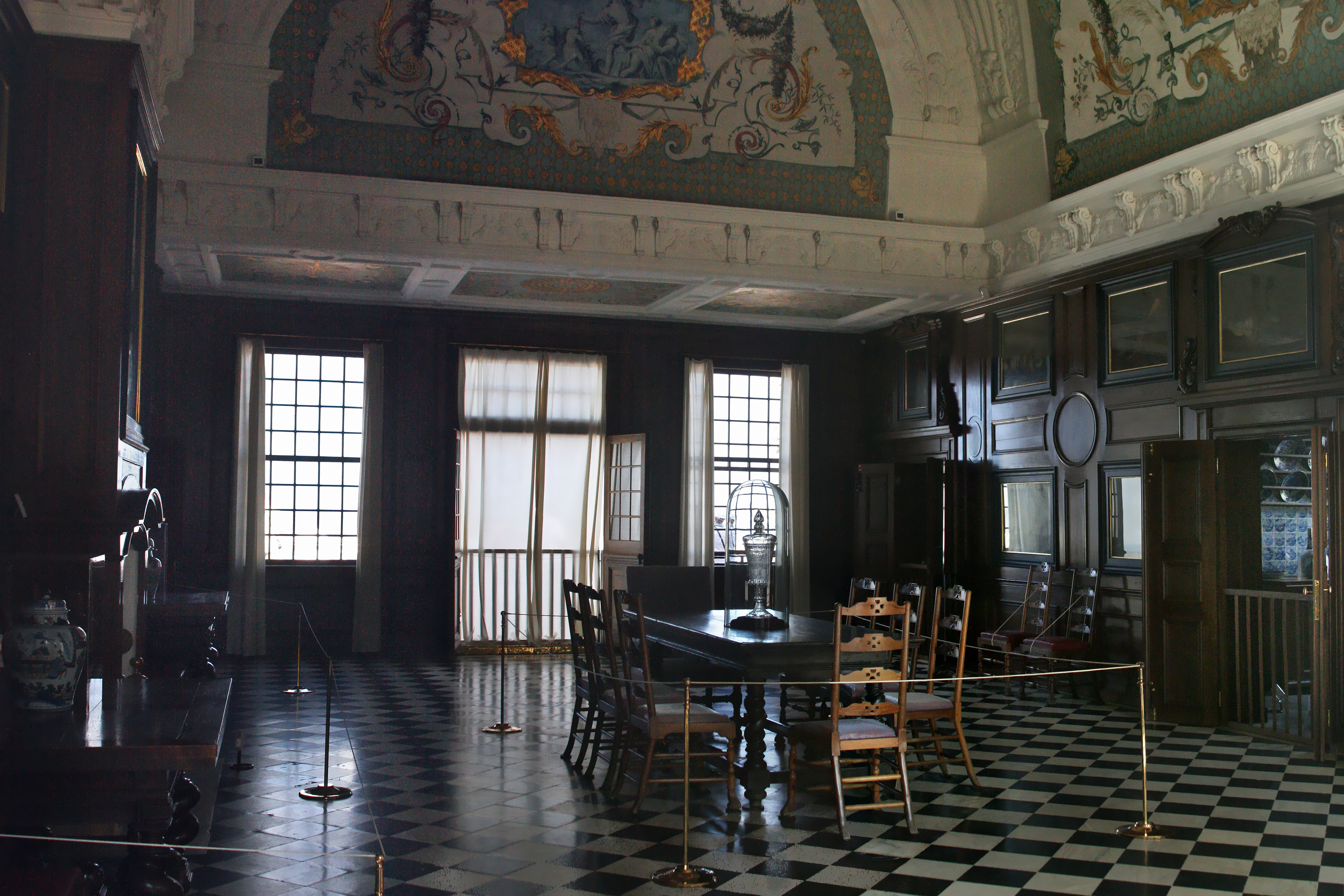
The Parade Hall of Monplaisir Palace (photo 2010)

In his memoirs, artist Ilya Repin recounted how he paid a visit to Nikolai Ge while the latter was working on the painting. The artist's studio was situated in the courtyard wing of house No. 36, 7th line of Vasilyevsky Island, where he lived. According to Repin, during his visit, a canvas was positioned on an easel with an initial charcoal sketch on which "Peter was silhouetted against the light background of a window in the Montplaisir palace". However, later, the artist "changed the background, replacing the windows with the opposite wall of the hall". Artist Alexander Rizzoni also visited Ge's studio. In a letter to Pavel Tretyakov, he described the unfinished canvas as follows: "I like Ge's painting very much; in my opinion, it is the best thing he has ever produced. I only wish he would keep the expression of the faces as they are now, everything is excellent. If he finishes it according to how it is now, it will be an extraordinary work". There are disagreements about the dating of Rizzoni's letter: in the collection Artists' letters to P. M. Tretyakov" (1968) it is dated 12 December 1870, but in the edition Nikolai Nikolaevich Ge: letters, articles, criticism, memories of contemporaries (1978) it is stated that this dating is wrong, because at that time "the painting existed only as a sketch", and the letter could not have been written earlier than autumn 1871, "when Ge, after a summer break, was finishing his painting".

=== 1st travelling exhibition and selling the painting ===
Nikolai Ge was preparing the painting Peter the Great Interrogating the Tsarevich Alexei Petrovich at Peterhof to be exhibited at the 1st exhibition of the Society for Travelling Art Exhibitions (Peredvizhniki). The opening of the exhibition was postponed on several occasions, but finally took place in St Petersburg on 29 November 1871. (Note: The Julian calendar ("old style") is used to date events that took place in the Russian Empire.) In April 1872, the exhibition moved to Moscow. The St Petersburg part of the exhibition was held in the building of the Imperial Academy of Arts, while the Moscow part was held in the premises of the Moscow School of Painting, Sculpture and Architecture. In addition, three other canvases by Ge were exhibited at the same event. These were portraits of Tatiana Petrovna Kostomarova (mother of Nikolai Kostomarov), writer Ivan Sergeyevich Turgenev and chemist Hugo Josef Schiff. The historical painting exhibited at the travelling exhibition comprised only two works, although sometimes Carl Goon's sketch The Head of an Old Man in a Helmet, or An Old Huguenot Warrior (now in the State Tretyakov Gallery) are also listed as such. Both of the usually listed historical paintings depicted various episodes from the life of Peter the Great. In addition to Peter and Alexei, Grigory Myasoyedov's canvas Grandfather of the Russian Fleet was also exhibited, with the subtitle "Franz Timmermann explains to young Peter Alexeevich the construction of a botik found in one of the barns in the village of Izmaylovo (May 1688)" (now at the Museum of Arts of Uzbekistan in Tashkent).

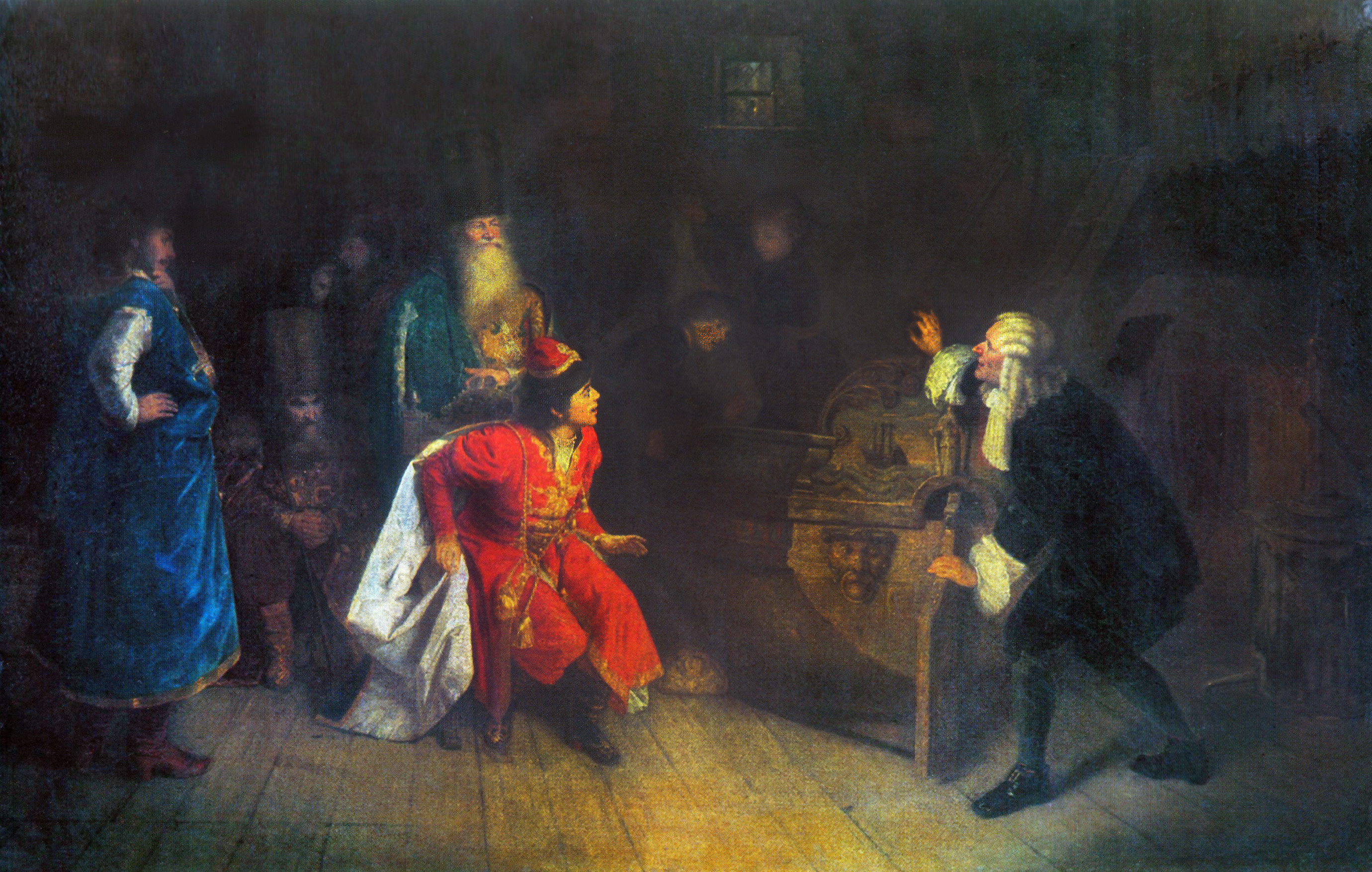
G.G. Myasoyedov. Grandfather of the Russian Fleet (1871, Museum of Arts of Uzbekistan)

Pavel Tretyakov purchased the painting Peter the Great Interrogating the Tsarevich Alexei Petrovich at Peterhof directly from the artist's studio, shortly before the opening of the travelling exhibition in St Petersburg. This was the first painting by Ge that Tretyakov acquired for his collection. During the exhibition, the painting was admired by Emperor Alexander II, who also expressed a desire to purchase it. However, no one had the courage to inform him that the painting had already been sold. To resolve this issue, Ge was requested to create an author's copy for Tretyakov and give the original to Alexander II. Nevertheless, the artist stated that he would not proceed without Pavel Mikhailovich's consent, and as a result, the original was presented to Tretyakov, while for Alexander II, an author's repetition was painted, which subsequently passed into the collection of the Russian Museum.

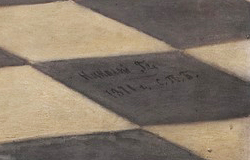
Signature of N. N. Ge and date on the "checkerboard" floor in the lower right corner of the painting

A large number of newspapers and magazines published articles devoted to the travelling exhibition, in which the painting Peter I interrogating and the Tsarevich Alexei received considerable attention. In general, the canvas received positive reviews from critics. According to Vladimir Stasov, "generally speaking, everyone praised and strongly praised Ge and his painting, everyone sympathised with him, but what exactly they praised often did not match, and what was a plus for some, was just a minus for others." The writer Mikhail Saltykov-Shchedrin (Otechestvennye Zapiski magazine) and the critic Vladimir Stasov (newspaper Sankt-Peterburgskie Vedomosti) praised Ge's painting. In contrast, the publicist Apollon Matushinsky (Russky Vestnik magazine) was more critical of the painting, contending that Ge had not explored the theme deeply enough. In an article published in the newspaper Golos, the author notes that the artist "does not always cope with the technique of painting," yet still praises the painting for being "characterised by the strictest realism" and places it at the pinnacle of the list of Russian historical paintings of the last decade. A critic from the newspaper Moskovskiye Vedomosti, who signed "L. A-ov" (Russian: «Л. А—ов»), wrote that "the work of Mr. Ge is remarkable in the power of expression and represents the best of everything he has created so far."

Prior to the opening of the travelling exhibition, 21 October 1871, artist Ivan Kramskoi wrote to landscape painter Fyodor Vasilyev that "Ge wrote a beautiful thing, "Peter", and after the opening of the exhibition, in a letter dated 6 December 1871, Kramskoy reported: "Ge reigns decisively. His picture has made a stunning impression on everyone". Artist Pavel Chistyakov wrote in a letter to Pavel Tretyakov on 2 January 1872: "Peter the Great is a very, very expressive thing, but opinions on this picture differ. This is absolutely logical. Everyone sees and looks at it and understands it in his own way. In any case, this picture is considered to be the best of N.N. Ge's paintings. To tell you the truth, I think so too. I am glad you have it."

=== Subsequent events ===
In September 1872, the 1st travelling exhibition continued its journey to other cities of the Russian Empire, visiting Kyiv (September–October) and Kharkiv (October–November). As the Society organised subsequent exhibitions, the list of host cities grew: Riga, Vilna, Oryol, Odesa and Kishinev were added during the second exhibition (1872–1874) and Kazan, Saratov and Voronezh during the third (1874–1875). Concurrently, a number of paintings exhibited at the inaugural travelling exhibition were included in subsequent exhibitions in cities where they had not previously been displayed. Of particular note is Ge's painting Peter I and the Tsarevich Alexei, which was referenced in the report of the Board of the Society on the second travelling exhibition, although without specifying the cities in which it was shown. It is also known that in October 1874, the painting was presented at the third travelling exhibition in Saratov (perhaps it was a reduced author's repetition). In the report on the Saratov exhibition, it was noted that "the greatest interest of spectators and critics was attracted by two historical paintings by N. N. Ge – Catherine at the tomb of Elizabeth and Peter interrogating the Tsarevich Alexei."

In 1873, the author's copy of the painting Peter the Great Interrogating the Tsarevich Alexei Petrovich at Peterhof was exhibited at the World's Fair in Vienna. Vladimir Stasov wrote that this painting, "which had so much success with us, made very little impression in Vienna and even went almost completely unnoticed, probably because the world exhibition was sent not the original, but a repetition or a copy, far from being equal to the original". In the same year, 1873, the original painting from the collection of Pavel Tretyakov was exhibited at the International Exhibition in London. The exhibition catalogue used the English title The Emperor Peter-the-Great questioning his son Alexis (N. Gay).

The original painting was also exhibited at the 1878 Exposition Universelle held in Paris. In the exhibition catalogue, the canvas was listed under the French title Pierre le Grand fait subir un interrogatoire au tsarevitch Alexis, à Peterhof (N. N. Gué). Vladimir Stasov observed that at the Paris exhibition, "such excellent paintings as Peter the Great Interrogating the Tsarevich Alexei by Ge and Reading the Regulations on the Liberation of the Peasants by Myasoyedov were hung at a height where secondary and third-rate paintings are usually hung," and "there they lost ninety hundredths of their dignity". Nevertheless, the French press identified the painting Peter and Alexei as an exemplar of the assertion that "Russian painters are fundamentally inspired by national history". The title of Ge's painting was also included in the catalogue of the All-Russian Industrial and Art Exhibition held in Moscow in 1882. However, for reasons that are unclear, it was not shown at the exhibition.

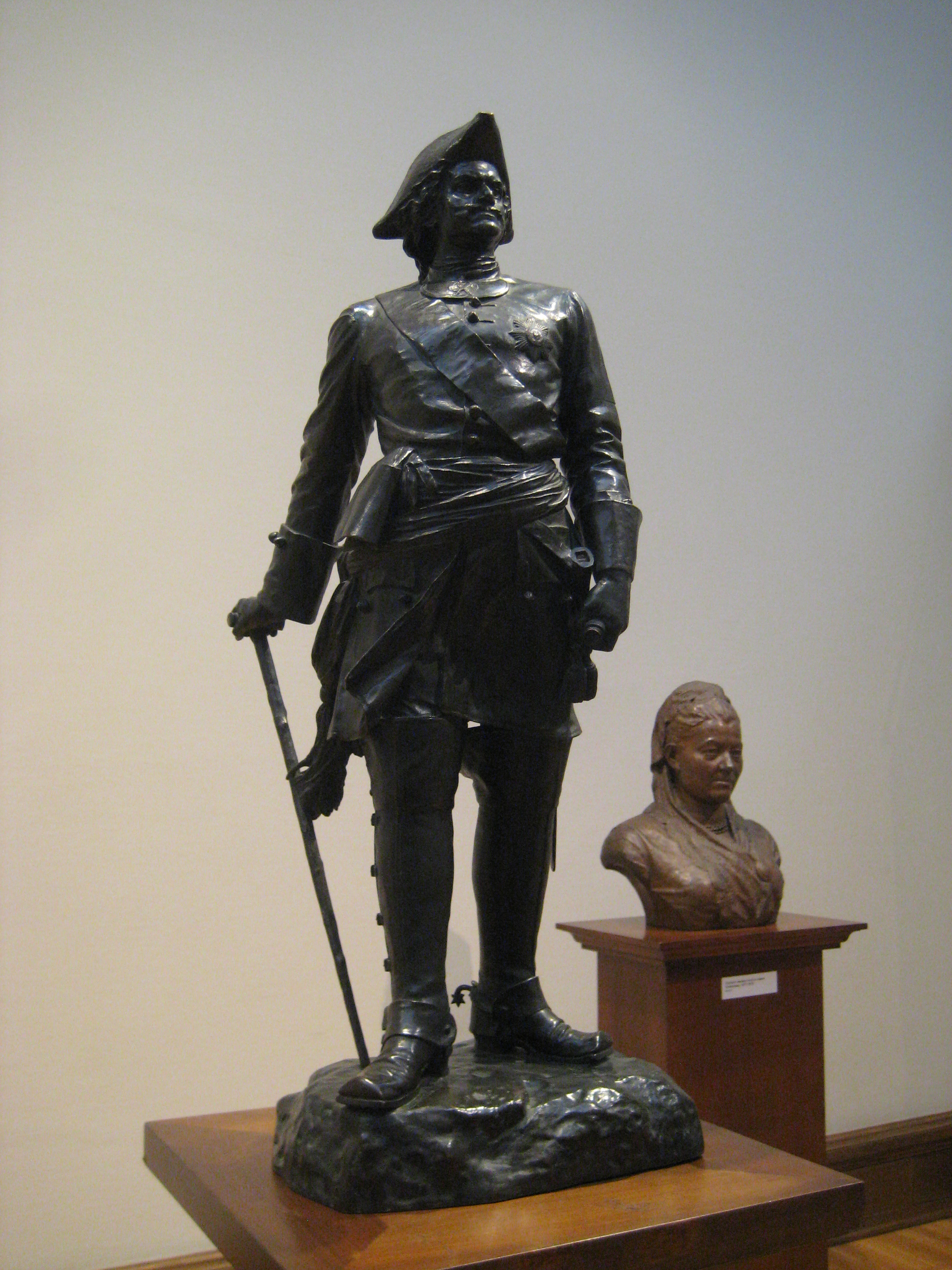
М. M. Antokolsky. Peter I (reduced reproduction, bronze, 1872, State Tretyakov Gallery)

The image of Peter the Great created by Ge served as the basis for a statue by the sculptor Mark Antokolsky. The first plaster version of this statue appeared in 1872, and it was subsequently cast in bronze and replicated in the form of monuments in Peterhof, St Petersburg, Taganrog and Arkhangelsk. Furthermore, a faience composition based on the subject of the painting Peter the Great Interrogating the Tsarevich Alexei Petrovich at Peterhof was produced in a limited edition at the end of the 19th century by the porcelain and faience production company of M. S. Kuznetsov at a factory in Tver Governorate. A number of such decorative sculptural compositions have survived, and are currently held in the collections of the Tver Regional Picture Gallery, the Egorievsky Historical and Art Museum, the All-Russian Museum of Decorative Art and the Konakovo faience factory museum.

The image of Alexei Petrovich from Ge's painting was evidently employed in the film Peter the Great (1937–1938), in which the role of the Tsarevich was portrayed by actor Nikolai Cherkasov. According to historian Alexander Kamensky, "by the time Soviet viewers saw this film, the picture of N. Ge has already become so famous that the director (V. Petrov) had nothing to do but to reproduce it". The role of Peter I in the film was played by the actor Nikolai Simonov. According to the art critic Sergei Khachaturov, the fact that Peter and Alexei was considered (or "designated") as Ge's masterpiece in Soviet times could be due to the fact that "the idea of the painting - the path to a bright future is inevitable, even if you have to walk over corpses - was close to the leaders of the Soviet country", and probably for this reason "the painting was loved and replicated".

External images
- Decorative sculpture Peter the Great interrogating the Tsarevich Alexei by the factory of the M.S. Kuznetsov Company
- Images from the film Peter the Great: Nikolai Cherkasov as Tsarevich Alexei and the scene of his interrogation by Peter I

At the conclusion of the 1930s, the painting underwent restoration, necessitated by the emergence of floating craquelure, particularly on Tsarevich Alexei's hair. This phenomenon was likely attributable to the utilisation of asphalt-containing substances by Ge during the painting process. The craquelure was repaired by the artist-restorer Evgeny Kudryavtsev through the encaustic method.

Subsequently, the painting Peter the Great Interrogating the Tsarevich Alexei Petrovich at Peterhof was exhibited at a number of exhibitions in the USSR, Russia and other countries. In the period between 1970 and 1971, the canvas was exhibited at the All-Union personal exhibition of Ge, held in Leningrad, Moscow, Kyiv and Minsk. In 1971, the painting participated in the reconstruction of the inaugural travelling exhibition of 1871–1872, held at the Tretyakov Gallery. In 1971–1972, it was exhibited in the exhibition Peredvizhniki in the State Tretyakov Gallery, which commemorated the centenary of the Society. In 1981, the painting was included in the exposition of Ge's solo exhibition, which was held to commemorate the 150th anniversary of the artist and took place at the Tretyakov Gallery in Moscow. In 1993, the painting was exhibited at the exhibition Peredvizhniki in the Tretyakov Gallery, which was held in Tokyo, Nara, and Fukuoka. The painting was also included in the 180th anniversary exhibition, What is Truth?, held from October 2011 to February 2012 at the New Tretyakov Gallery on Krymsky Val.

The author's reiteration of the painting Peter the Great Interrogating the Tsarevich Alexei Petrovich at Peterhof from the Russian Museum collection was exhibited in 1983 in Penza, at the Museum of One Painting named after G. V. Myasnikov (a branch of the Penza Regional Picture Gallery named after K. A. Savitsky).

== Subject, characters and composition ==
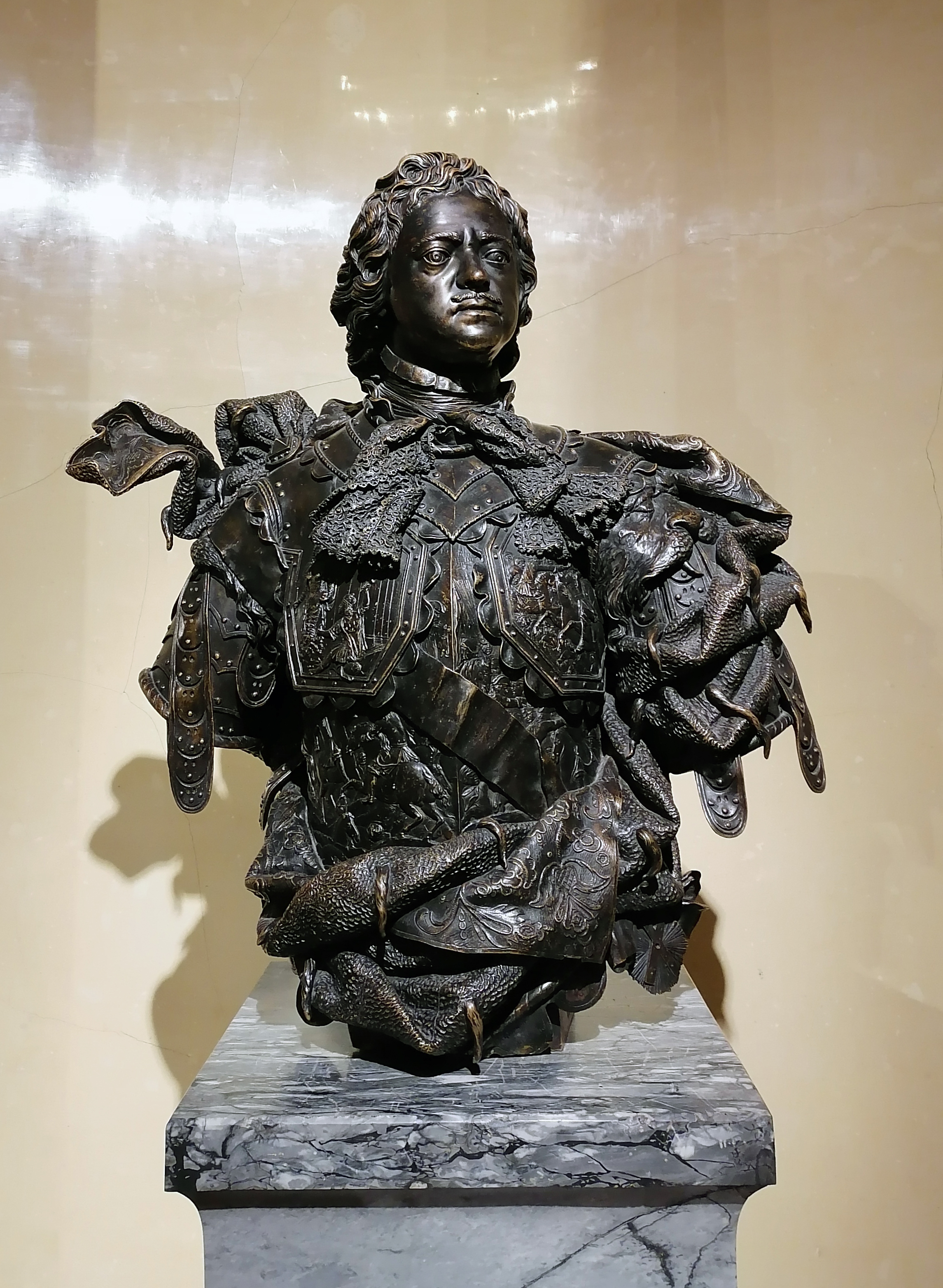
C.B. Rastrelli. Bust of Peter I (1723–1730, Hermitage)

The painting depicts Peter I and his son Alexei Petrovich in the interior of the Monplaisir Palace in Peterhof. Peter I is depicted seated to the right of the table in a chair trimmed with red velvet, while Tsarevich Alexei stands to the left of the table. The canvas offers a psychological interpretation of the historical drama. Tsarevich Alexei, disillusioned with the authoritarian manner in which Peter the Great's reforms were implemented, sought refuge in Western Europe. However, he was forcibly returned to Russia and accused of conspiring to seize power. With the knowledge of his father, Peter I, Alexei Petrovich was imprisoned in the Peter and Paul Fortress, where he died of torture on 26 June [7 July] 1718. The prototype of the image of Peter the Great could have been a bronze bust by Carlo Bartolomeo Rastrelli (1723–1730), and the face of Tsarevich Alexei bears a resemblance to his portrait by the German artist Johann Gottfried Tannauer, created in the 1710s.

Historian Eugene Anisimov posits that the primary catalyst for the conflict between Peter and Alexei was not ideological divergence but palace intrigues driven by Catherine, Peter's second wife, who sought to displace her stepson Alexei and elevate her son, Tsarevich Peter Petrovich, to the throne. The relationship between Peter I and Alexei Petrovich began to deteriorate from 1715, the year of Peter Petrovich's birth. The harassment of his father forced Alexei to flee abroad. In an effort to persuade Alexei to return to Russia, Peter I offered to pardon the escape. However, upon Alexei's return, he was handed over to the Privy Chancellery for investigation of "high treason." His mistress, Afrosinya, was also arrested and intimidated by the investigators, and thus provided testimony against Alexei.

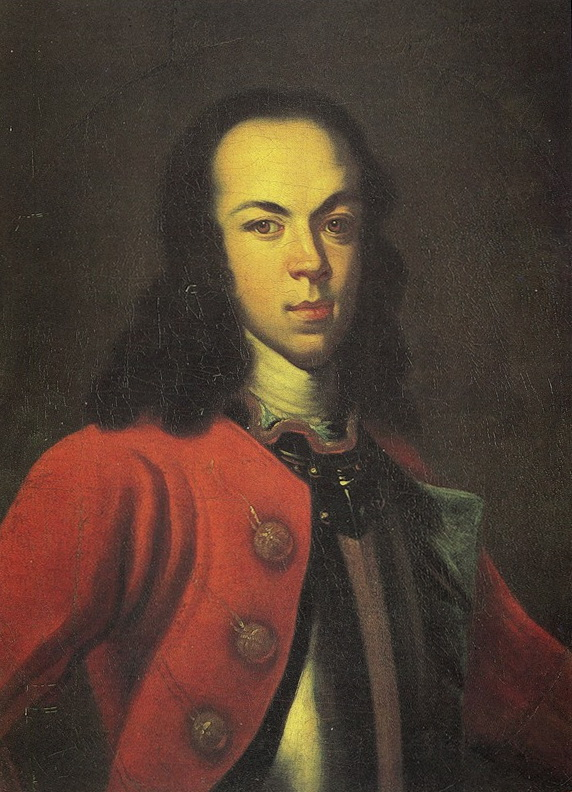
J.G. Tannauer. Portrait of Alexei Petrovich (1710s, State Russian Museum)

Despite the outward composure of Peter I and Tsarevich Alexei, it is evident that they are experiencing considerable anxiety and mental distress. It would appear that a heated discussion took place between them, the result of which was that Peter I became even more convinced of his son's betrayal. This is confirmed by the documents on the table, which were scattered when one of them fell to the floor. Before pronouncing sentence, Peter I casts his son's face in his gaze, still hoping to discern signs of remorse. Alexei, under his father's gaze, lowered his eyes. He was confident that Peter I would not dare to sentence his own son to death; therefore, he kept silent and did not ask for forgiveness. The artist and art historian Nikolai Shchekotov noted that the face of Tsarevich Alexei "belongs to a man who is not characterised by a more or less clear expression of his will, whose thoughts go confused, slippery paths, feelings are changeable, being rather the fruit of a painful nervous irritation than the expression of a strong, deep soul." Alexei is attired in a velvet camisole, black shoes with buckles, and high silk stockings on his feet. Light lace cuffs and a shirt collar serve to accentuate the pallor of his face. Peter I is attired in a black kaftan belonging to the Preobrazhensky Regiment, with red lapels on the sleeves and black boots on his feet.

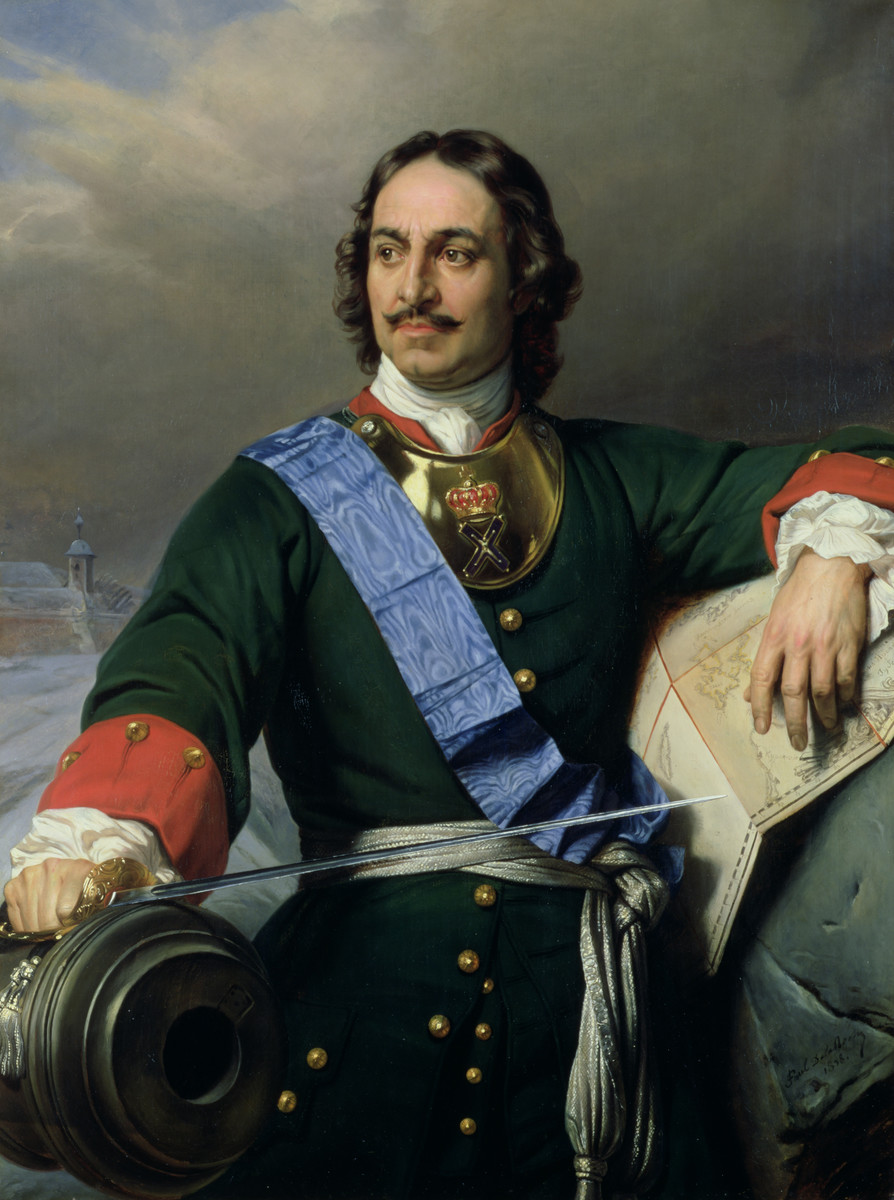
Paul Delaroche. Peter I in the uniform of an officer of the Preobrazhensky Regiment (1838, Hamburger Kunsthalle)

The contrast between light and shade in the composition serves to highlight the differences between the characters. According to Tatiana Karpova, an art historian, the figure of Tsarevich Alexei is illuminated by a paler, "as if lunar, dead light". This symbolises the fact that "he already belongs more to the realm of shadows than to real life with its passions and colours". In contrast, the face of Peter the Great is "vigorously moulded with contrasting chiaroscuro". The corner of the table and the red-and-black tablecloth hanging from it ("colours of mourning") appear to serve as a visual separation between father and son, suggesting a foreshadowing of the tragic outcome of the drama. Alexei's confusion is further emphasised by the gesture of his left hand, which involuntarily fidgets with the tablecloth. The alternation of black and white floor tiles has been interpreted in several ways - "an expression of the spirit of regularity of Peter's epoch, black and white in the characters of Peter and the Tsarevich, and a chessboard on which the final game, lost by Alexei, is played out".

Some authors express doubt that Peter I ever interrogated Tsarevich Alexei in the Montplaisir Palace, which by 1718 was not yet fully completed. Indeed, there are claims that the interrogation "did not actually take place in Montplaisir." On the other hand, it is claimed that in May 1718 the Austrian envoy to St Petersburg, Otto Pleier, reported to his government that Peter had gone to the "amusement palace of Peterhof", where the tsarevich had also been taken, and that the tsar had interrogated him there in person; sometimes more precise dates are given for the possible stay of Peter and Alexei in Peterhof - 15–16 May. It is thought unlikely that Peter I interrogated the Tsarevich in a one-on-one setting. Despite this, Ge chose to depict only Peter and Alexei in the painting, allowing him to focus on the psychological aspects of their experiences.

The anguished search for a solution depicted in the painting suggests that Ge wished to portray Peter the Great not as an executioner, but as a father who transcended his personal desires for the sake of the state's interests. Art historian Alla Vereshchagina observed that, "for the first time in Russian historical painting, typical, alien to idealisation images of real historical figures were created", because "psychologism determined the true historicism of the work".

Fragments of the painting Peter the Great Interrogating the Tsarevich Alexei Petrovich at Peterhof

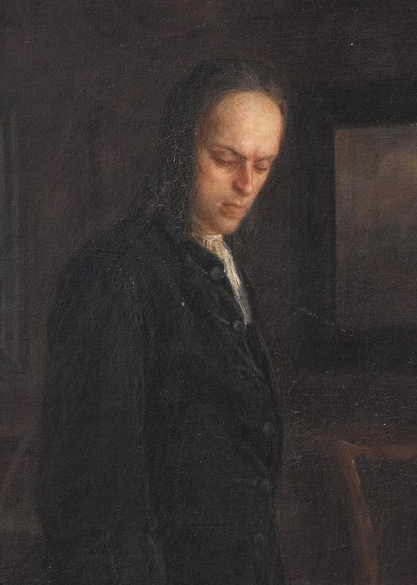
Tsarevich Alexei

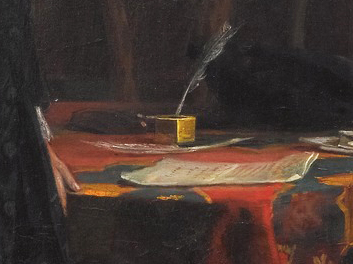
Papers on the table, the tablecloth and Alexei's hand

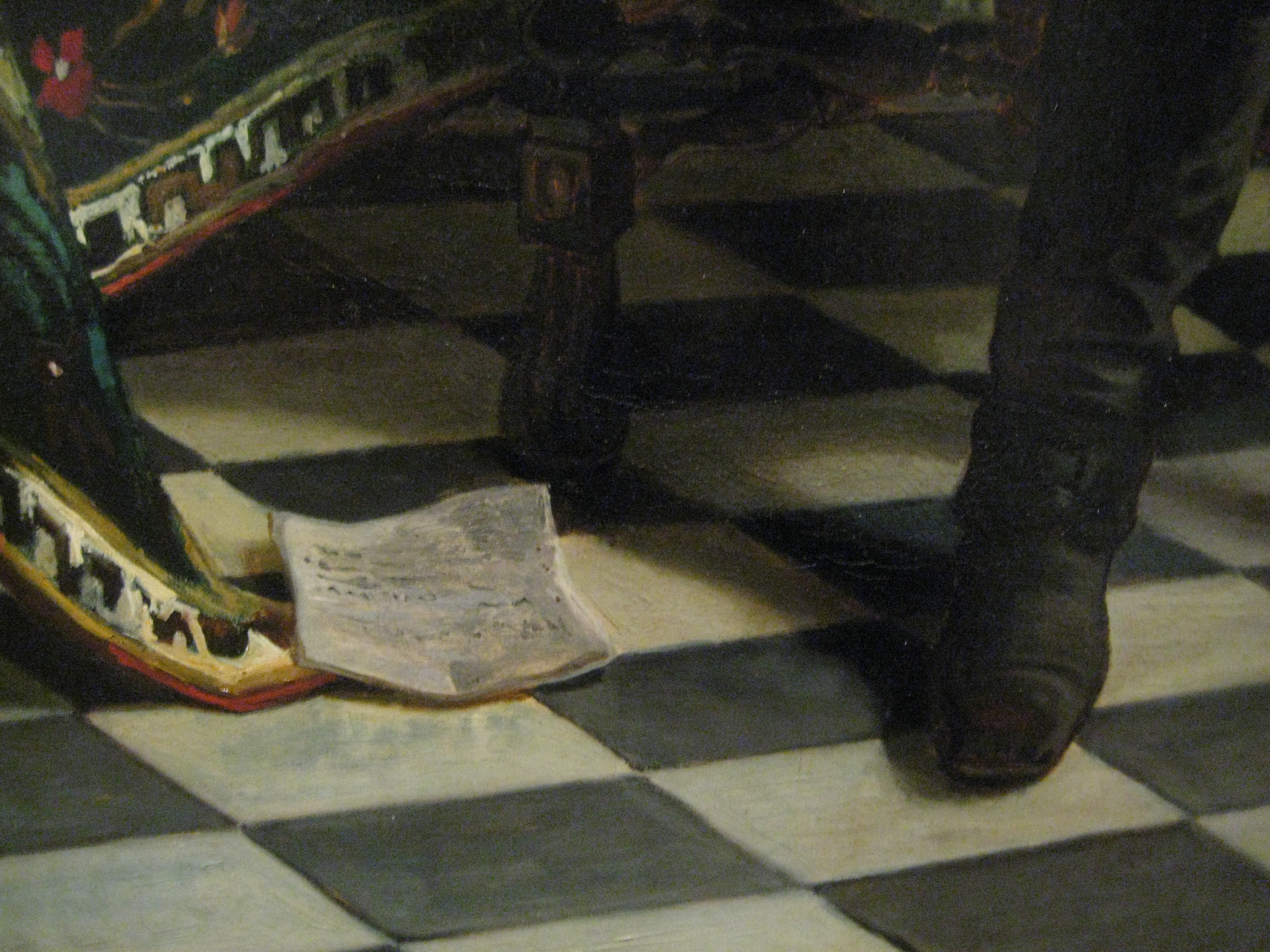
Paper that fell on the floor

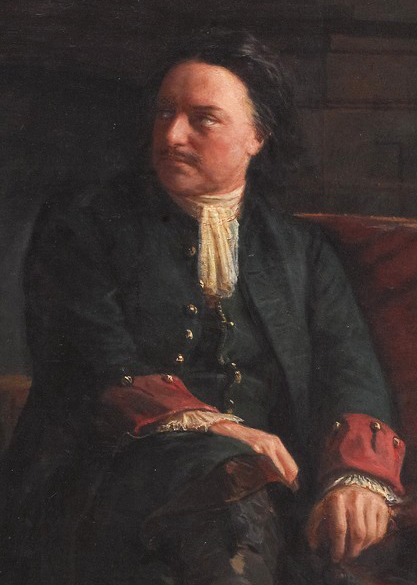
Peter the Great

The interior decoration of the front hall as depicted by Ge evokes a "Dutch setting," though not in the cozy manner of the paintings of the old Dutch masters. Instead, it features rigid and severe features that align with the meaning of the drama being played out here. The illuminated part of the carpet tablecloth in the foreground, with its excessively clear and detailed pattern, including sharp colour combinations, plays a certain role. According to Nikolai Shchekotov, this strongly manifested pattern, "on the one hand, gives a note of ornamentation to the overall extremely modest furnishings, tactfully reminding us that the matter is taking place in a palace, and on the other hand, it evokes a feeling of a certain uneasiness in the space between the two austere figures of Peter and Alexei, an uneasiness and a kind of anxiety that is quite appropriate in this case". Ge himself described this aspect of his work on the canvas as follows: "I was looking for a carpet to cover the table in the same painting; I found it in a Dutch painting and sketched out only one form of the pattern. I made the whole rug with all the coloured patterns and perspective as I needed it - all done at home without running to check." There are claims that the carpet depicted in Ge's painting is the work of Shirvan weavers. However, "in terms of composition, main motif and gloominess of the colour scheme," it corresponds with the carpets of the Caspian Turkmens, which are related in subject and execution.

In the background, the wall of the ceremonial hall, decorated "with four paintings of the Dutch school," can be discerned in the gloom. It is known that Peter the Great imported a number of Dutch paintings from abroad for the decoration of the Monplaisir. Among these, the works of the painter and engraver Adam Silo occupied a special place. The paintings were displayed in the palace's ceremonial hall and other rooms, which were regarded as "the first picture gallery in Russia".

== Studies, sketches and reproductions ==
=== Sketches and studies ===
The Tretyakov Gallery maintains a sketch bearing the same title as the painting Peter the Great Interrogating the Tsarevich Alexei Petrovich at Peterhof (1870, oil on canvas, 22 × 26.7 cm, Inventory No. Zh-593). Following the death of Ge in 1894, his sons presented this sketch to the artist Alexander Kurenny. It was subsequently inherited by A. D. Nekrasov and acquired by the Tretyakov Gallery in 1970 from Kurenny's heirs. The composition of the sketch differs significantly from that of the final version of the painting. In the sketch, Peter is depicted sitting in an armchair on the left, against the background of the window. Alexei, on the other hand, is shown standing with his head down on the right, by the table. The setting of the sketch bears little resemblance to the interior of the Montplaisir Palace, "with its huge, full-height walls, glazed windows with frequent bindings". According to art historian Irina Leytes, the scene depicted in this sketch reads as follows: "the guilty son, still inspiring the viewer with involuntary sympathy by the elegance of his appearance, obediently listens to the judgement of the formidable but fair parent-monarch". In addition, the existence of the study Portrait of Peter the Great (canvas, oil, 89 × 76.5 cm), previously held in the collection of Lidia Ruslanova, is known.

Sketch and studies for the painting Peter the Great Interrogating the Tsarevich Alexei Petrovich at Peterhof

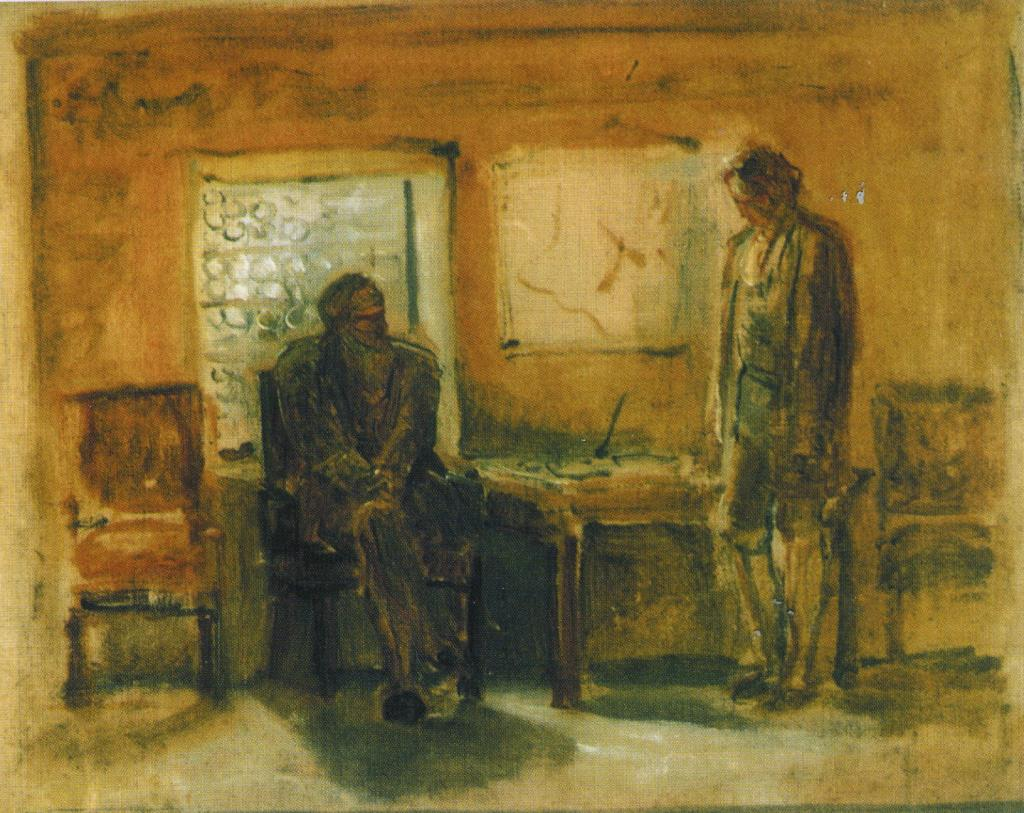
Peter the Great Interrogating the Tsarevich Alexei Petrovich at Peterhof (sketch, 1870, State Tretyakov Gallery)

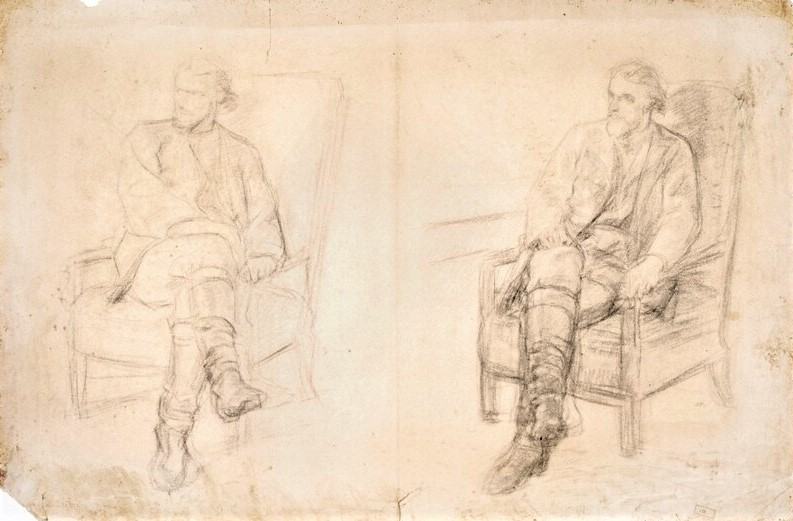
A man sitting in an armchair (two studies for the figure of Peter I, 1870, State Tretyakov Gallery)

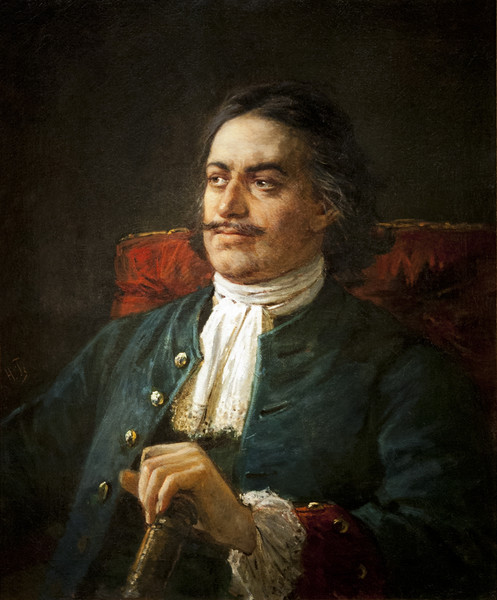
Portrait of Peter I (study, private collection)

The collection of the Tretyakov Gallery also contains graphic sketches for the painting Peter the Great Interrogating the Tsarevich Alexei Petrovich at Peterhof dated 1870, A Man Sitting in an Armchair (two sketches for the figure of Peter the Great Interrogating the Tsarevich Alexei Petrovich at Peterhof, paper, charcoal, 68 × 101.3 cm, inv. R-13746), Three Standing Male Figures (sketches for the figure of Tsarevich Alexei, paper, charcoal, paste-up, 100 × 67.8 cm, inv. R-13747), Standing Man (sketch for a figure of Tsarevich Alexei, paper, Italian pencil, 55.4 × 38.2 cm, Inventory No. R-13748), Standing Male Figures (paper, Italian pencil, 55.8 × 38 cm, Inventory No. R-13749) and Male Figure from the Back (paper, Italian pencil, 55.5 × 38 cm, Inventory No. R-13750). All of these drawings were in the possession of the artist's son, Nikolai Ge Jr., until 1938. From 1938 to 1952, they were in the possession of Beatrice de Watteville. Subsequently, they were held by the publishing house Librairie nouvelle. In 1974, they were acquired by Geneva collector Christophe Bolman. In 2011, they were purchased by OJSC "VTB Bank" for the Tretyakov Gallery.

=== Author's replicas ===
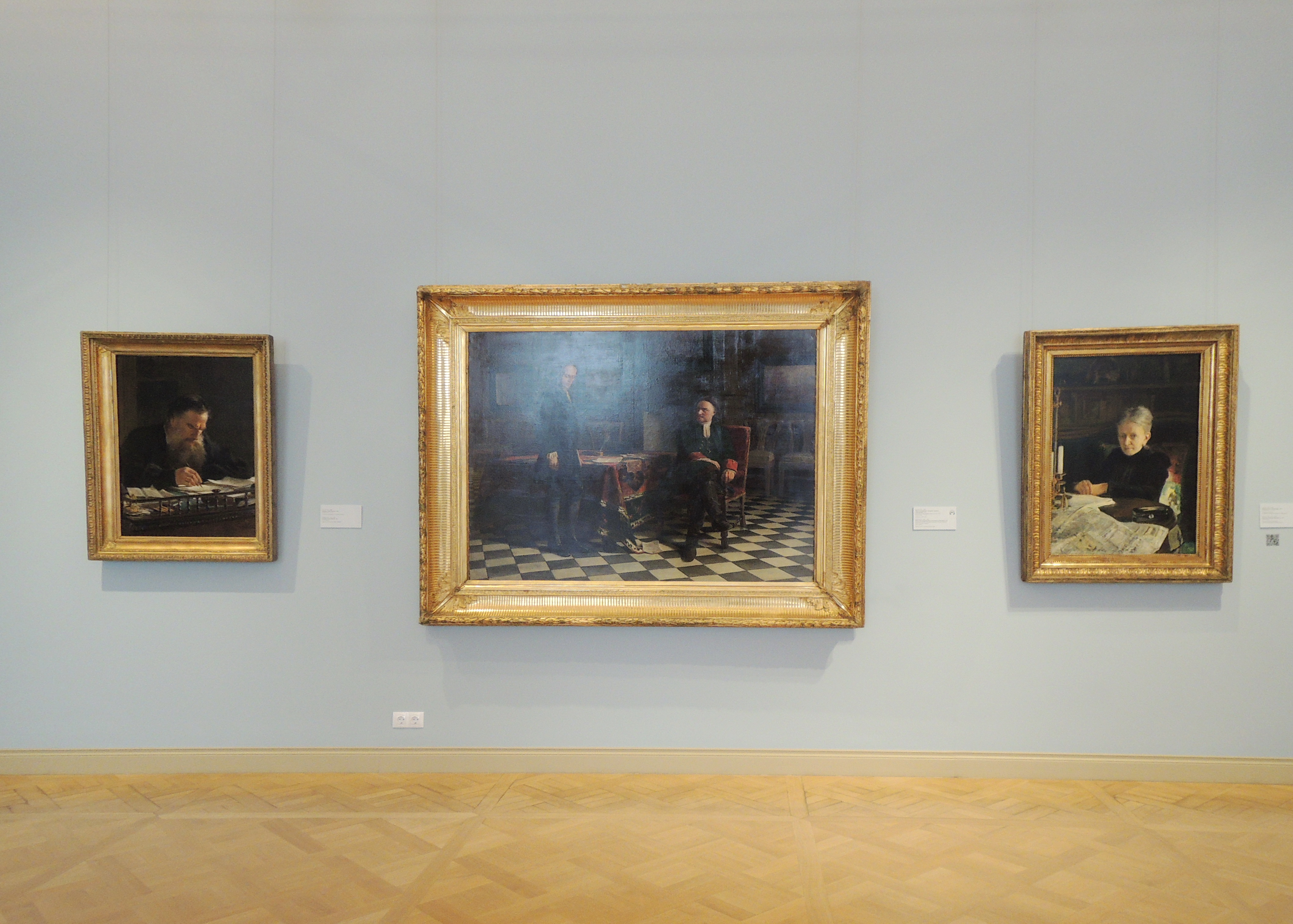
Author's reproduction of the painting Peter the Great Interrogating the Tsarevich Alexei Petrovich at Peterhof in the State Russian Museum

External images
- Author's replica of the painting in the Museum of Arts of Uzbekistan
- Author's replica of the painting in the Museum of Fine Arts of Turkmenistan

There are several full-length replicas of the painting by the same author. One of the replicas is currently on display at the State Russian Museum (1872, oil on canvas, 134.5 × 173 cm, inv. Zh-4142). It was acquired by the museum in 1897 from the Hermitage. This is the canvas that Ge created at the behest of Alexander II, and it was subsequently gifted to the Russian Museum by Nicholas II.

Another replica, also dated 1872, is currently on display at the Museum of Arts of Uzbekistan in Tashkent. The painting was acquired by the museum from the collection of Grand Duke Nikolai Konstantinovich (according to some sources, the painting was previously in the collection of his father, Grand Duke Konstantin Nikolayevich). Nikolai Konstantinovich resided in Tashkent for a considerable period, during which time a distinctive assemblage of Russian and foreign art was amassed in his palace, which served as the foundation for the collection of the Museum of Arts of Uzbekistan. In the 21st century, the possibility of returning the Grand Duke's collection to its original location, the palace, is being actively discussed.

Furthermore, an undated author's replica is held in the Museum of Fine Arts of Turkmenistan in Ashgabat.

Additionally, reduced replicas of this canvas by the artist are also known. One of the replicas, dated 1874, is housed by the Rybinsk State Historical, Architectural and Art Museum-Reserve (canvas, oil on canvas, 58.4 × 74.3 cm, Inventory No. Zh-211). A further reduced reproduction, also dated 1874, is held in the collection of the Novgorod State United Museum-Reserve (oil on canvas, 58 × 74 cm, Inventory No. 2595, received in 1926 from the State Russian Museum; the museum's website lists the dating as "19th century, end"). Another smaller reproduction, dated 1878, is held in a private collection in Kyiv.

It is also known of the existence of a grisaille drawing of the same name, made by Nikolai Ge in 1878 at the request of the lithographer Alexander Beggrov for the production of heliogravures. Later the drawing was kept by A.F. Felten (St. Petersburg) and in 1912 it was bought from him by the Moscow collector and art patron Ivan Tsvetkov. It was then transferred to the collection of the State Russian Museum and in 1929 to the Saratov Art Museum. The museum's catalogue describes the drawing as "a photographic print made by the author in grisaille", measuring 40 × 50.4 cm.

The Tretyakov Gallery also holds Ge's etching Peter the Great Interrogating the Tsarevich Alexei Petrovich at Peterhof (1872), previously in the collection of L.M. Kovalsky.

== Reviews and criticism ==
=== 19th century ===
The writer and critic Mikhail Saltykov-Shchedrin, in his review "The First Russian Travelling Art Exhibition", published in the magazine Otechestvennye Zapiski, paid much attention to Ge's painting. In particular, he wrote: "In the foreground we meet here with the picture of Professor Ge "Peter the Great, interrogating his son". In front of us only two figures and strictly-simple situation, which has nothing striking to the eye <...> Nevertheless, anyone who saw these two simple, not at all spectacularly staged figures, will have to confess that he was a witness to one of those amazing dramas that are never expunged from memory." Noting that "apparently, Peter's personality is extremely likable for Mr Ge", Saltykov-Shchedrin, for his part, gives a high assessment of Peter I's role in Russian history and his moral qualities. He favourably evaluates Peter's reforms, believing that the subsequent failures of some of them occurred not because of Peter's fault, "but because his successors supported only the letter of the reforms and completely forgot their reason". Consequently, in the conflict depicted in the painting, Saltykov-Shchedrin's sympathies are entirely on the side of Peter, who was concerned that Tsarevich Alexei, who would ascend the throne as Peter's heir, would destroy much of what he had created. According to Saltykov-Shchedrin, "the figure of Peter appears to be filled with that luminous beauty which is given to a man only by his undoubtedly beautiful inner world", while for Tsarevich Alexei the meeting with his father was also "full of moral anxieties, but these anxieties were of a different, undoubtedly low quality".

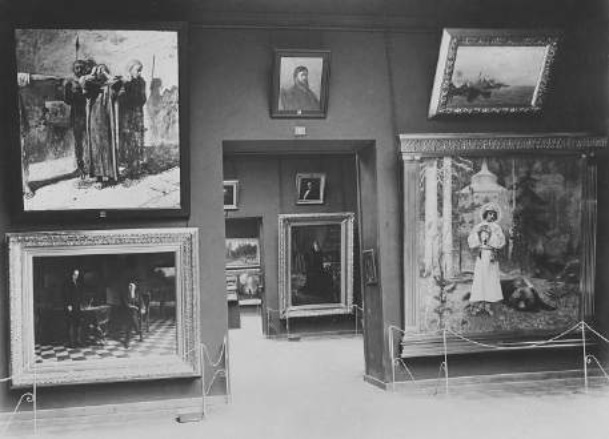
Peter the Great interrogating the Tsarevich Alexei and other paintings in the exposition of the Tretyakov Gallery (photo by Albert Mey, 1902)

An article about the 1st Travelling Exhibition was also published by art critic Vladimir Stasov, who also regarded Ge's painting as one of the most outstanding works on display. In particular, he wrote: "None of Ge's previous paintings has ever bore such a stamp of maturity and skill as this one. The strength and colourfulness of writing even in such trifles as, for example, a multicoloured carpet on the table, the simplicity and extraordinary truth of every detail, starting from Peter's head <...> and up to his dusty boots and kaftan, make this picture one of the Russian jewels, on a par with the best historical paintings of new Western art." Concurrently, in contrast to Saltykov-Shchedrin, Stasov was more critical of the character of Peter the Great, considering him a tyrant and despot, and Tsarevich Alexei a victim. It was from this perspective that he critiqued the composition of Ge's painting.

In an article published in the journal Russky Vestnik (vol. 99, 1872), the art critic Apollo Matushinsky wrote that the painting "Peter the Great Interrogating Tsarevich Alexei" "is well conceived, but it is far from making the impression it should have made, due to its highly tragic content". In Matuszynski's opinion, Ge did not develop the theme deeply enough, did not cover all its details, "limiting himself to conveying only the most important aspects of the chosen drama" and not allowing the viewer to look "into the very soul of its actors". Criticising the way the figures of Peter the Great and Tsarevich Alexei were portrayed, Matushinsky nevertheless acknowledged that the colouring of the painting "seems to be somewhat more lively" than in Ge's previous works.

In 1875, the magazine Ancient and New Russia (nos. 1–2) published the work of historian and publicist Nikolai Kostomarov, entitled Tsarevich Alexei Petrovich. On the painting by N. N. Ge, in which Kostomarov provides a comprehensive account of the Tsarevich's life and activities, with particular emphasis on his relationship with his father, Peter I. Kostomarov posits that the scene depicted by Ge refers to the events of 17 May 1818, and that the papers on the table are the fatal testimony of his mistress, Afrosinya Fyodorovna. Kostomarov characterised the image of Tsarevich Alexei presented in Ge's painting as follows: "The artist depicted This tsarevich in an impeccable and masterly manner. Stupidity, petty cowardice, mental and bodily laziness, gross animalism are visible in his features, struck by grief and longing, his grief is not such as to excite in himself that compassion, which is inseparable from respect."

=== 20th and 21st centuries ===
The artist and art historian Nikolai Shchekotov posited that Nikolai Ge succeeded in creating a painting, Peter the Great and the Tsarevich Alexei, that captivates the viewer, who perceives it "with great trust" and immerses himself in its consideration with "an interest that gradually leads to excitement." According to Shchekotov, the painting has retained its significance for many decades since its creation. It has "become part of Russian culture forever, and in it we see one of the outstanding examples of Russian art".

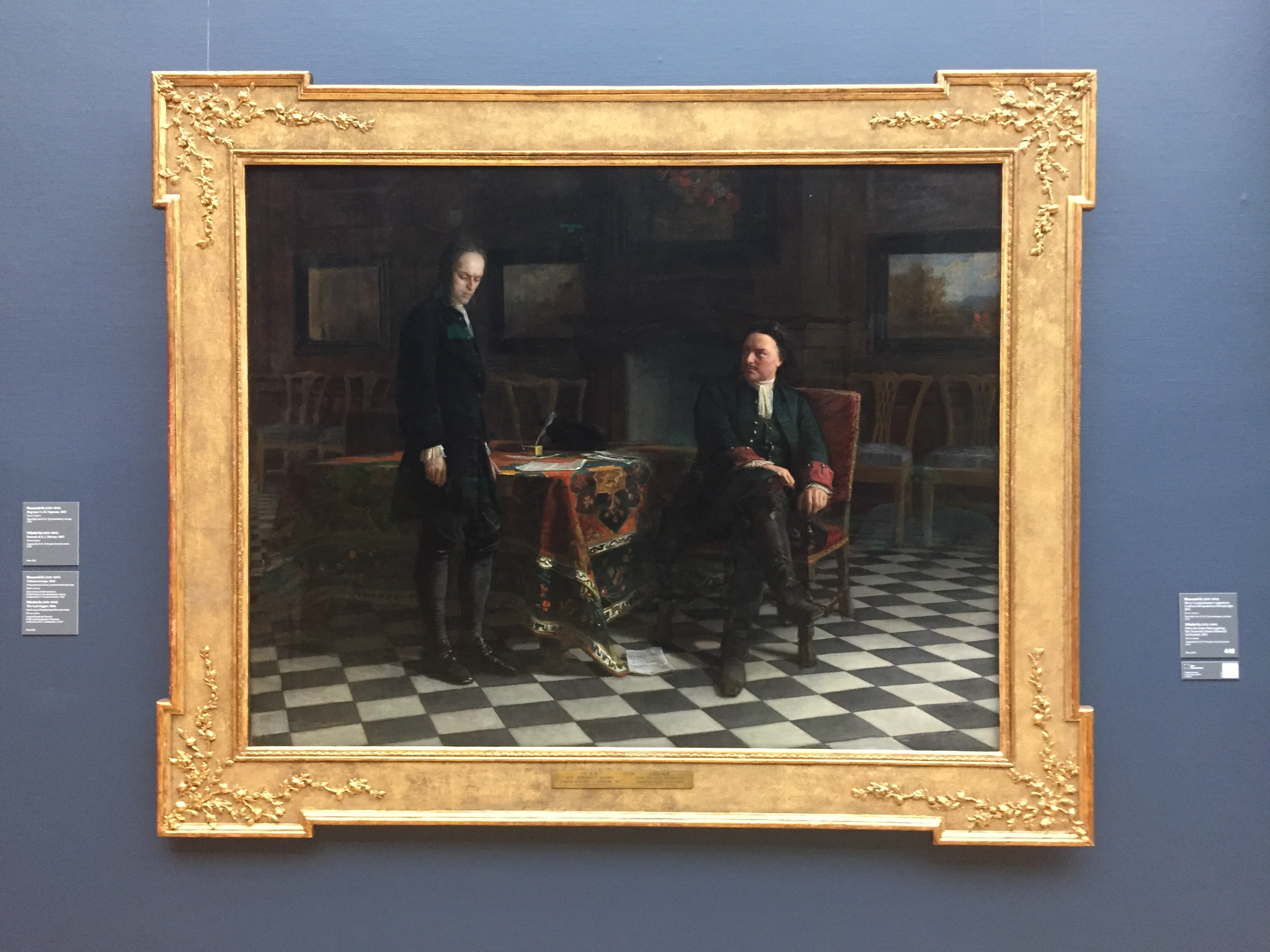
The painting Peter the Great Interrogating the Tsarevich Alexei Petrovich at Peterhof in the State Tretyakov Gallery

Art historian Alla Vereshchagina noted that the painting Peter the Great Interrogating the Tsarevich Alexei Petrovich at Peterhof was "the most important milestone" on the way to the development of a new direction in Russian historical painting of the 1870s, associated with the artistic interpretation of the outstanding man and his place in history. According to Vereshchagina, it was in this work that the contradictions and clashes of public interests were first so clearly depicted, and in this sense "there is a direct path from Ge's painting to Surikov's work".

Art historian Natalia Zograf wrote that the painting Peter and Alexei is "one of the most striking evidences of the convergence of Ge's art with that of his fellow travellers", as the artist strives to strictly follow historical authenticity, both in the choice of situation and setting, and in the characterisation of the actors. According to Zograf, in this work, when assessing historical figures, Ge is "primarily interested in the internal, psychological motives of actions", and he is "guided by the need to assess people and events in their moral sense".

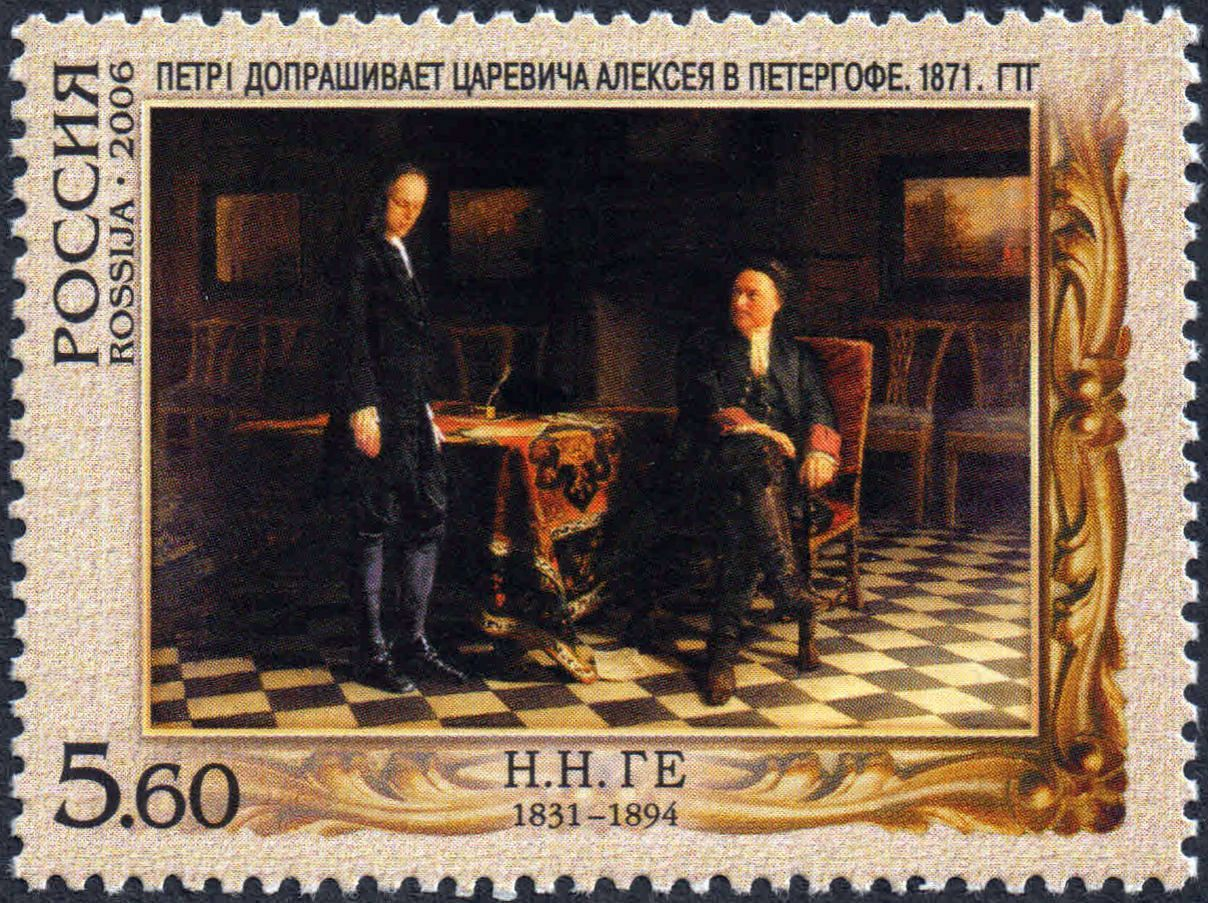
The painting Peter the Great interrogating Tsarevich Alexei at Peterhof on the Russian postage stamp of 2006

According to art historian Dmitry Sarabianov, in the painting Peter and Alexei Ge interpreted the image of Peter I from the position of advanced democrats, who saw him as "a progressive figure of his time, a fervent patriot and defender of Russia's progress." Sarabianov wrote that in this work, for the first time in Russian historical painting of the second half of the 19th century, "the theme of the struggle between two forces is resolved so vividly and concisely" and "the dramatic conflict is revealed with such depth of psychological interpretation of the actors" (to a lesser extent, such features were inherent in some earlier works by Vyacheslav Schwarz and Valery Jakobi). According to Sarabianov, the creation of Peter and Alexei marked the introduction of a new type of "realistic historical picture".

Art historian Grigory Sternin observed that the painting Peter I and the Tsarevich Alexei, which emerged on the eve of the bicentenary of Peter the Great's birth, was interpreted by his contemporaries as an attempt "to fit not so much into the artistic, but into the historiosophic context of the epoch". Consequently, the viewers' disagreements were primarily focused on determining the artist's stance in the conflict between the historical figures represented by Peter and Alexei. According to Sternin, despite the fact that the artist himself in this work wanted to be "first and foremost a documentary historian", the audience had "the most divergent assessments of the ideological content of the canvas": on the one hand, the author was reproached for Slavophilia and excessive sympathy for Tsarevich Alexei, and on the other - praised for "the ability to reveal in the image of Peter the energy and creative power of the new Russian state".

According to art historian Tatiana Karpova, one can trace the continuity between Peter and Alexei and Ge's earlier paintings on Gospel subjects, such as Last Supper (1863, State Russian Museum) and Heralds of the Resurrection (1867, State Tretyakov Gallery) - all these works deal with "the confrontation and clash of two irreconcilable positions, two world views at a moment of a major historical turning point". According to Karpova, in the painting Peter and Alexei "no one is right or wrong, each historical character has his own truth behind him".

== See also ==
Ivan the Terrible and His Son Ivan – 1885 painting by Ilya Repin

== Bibliography ==
- Анисимов, Е.В. (2020). 100 картин русской истории [100 paintings of Russian history] (in Russian). Saint Petersburg: Арка. ISBN 978-5-91208-411-9.
- Арбитман, Э.Н. (1972). Жизнь и творчество Н. Н. Ге [Life and creative work of N. N. Ge] (in Russian). Saratov: Приволжское книжное издательство.
- Баева, В. (2010). Николай Николаевич Ге [Nikolai Nikolaevich Ge]. Великие художники (in Russian). Vol. 35. Moscow: Directmedia Publishing and Komsomolskaya Pravda. ISBN 978-5-7475-0012-9.
- Верещагина, А.Г. (1960). Вячеслав Григорьевич Шварц [Vyacheslav Grigorievich Schwarts] (in Russian). Leningrad - Moscow: Iskusstvo (publishing house).
- Верещагина, А.Г. (1973). Художник. Время. История. Очерки русской исторической живописи XVIII — начала XX века [Artist. Time. History. Sketches of Russian historical painting of the 18th - early 20th century] (in Russian). Leningrad: Iskusstvo (publishing house) (Leningrad Branch).
- Верещагина, А.Г. (1988). Николай Николаевич Ге [Nikolai Nikolaevich Ge]. Русские живописцы XIX века (in Russian). Leningrad: Artist of the RSFSR.
- Горина, Т.Н. (1961). Н. Н. Ге [N. N. Ge]. Мастера русского искусства (in Russian). Moscow: State Publishing House of Fine Arts.
- Горина, Т.Н. (1962). "Николай Николаевич Ге" [Nikolai Nikolaevich Ge]. Русское искусство: очерки о жизни и творчестве художников. Вторая половина XIX века, часть I [Russian Art: Essays on the life and work of artists. The second half of the XIX century, part I] (in Russian). А.И. Леонов. Moscow: Iskusstvo. pp. 445–466.
- Евсеева, Е.Д. (2022). "И. Е. Цветков — заказчик живописи" [I. Е. Tsvetkov - commissioner of painting] (PDF). Третьяковские Чтения 2020 (in Russian). Moscow: State Tretyakov Gallery: 374–393. ISBN 978-5-89580-313-4.
- Зауст, С.К. (2020). Костюм в русской живописи второй половины XVIII — XIX в. Диссертация на соискание учёной степени кандидата искусствоведения [Costume in Russian painting of the second half of 18th-19th c. Dissertation for the degree of Candidate of Art History] (PDF) (in Russian). Saint Petersburg: Saint Petersburg Stieglitz State Academy of Art and Design.
- Зограф, Н.Ю. (1974). Николай Ге [Nikolai Ge]. Мастера мирового искусства (in Russian). Moscow: Fine Art.
- Зограф, Н.Ю. (1983). "Всесоюзная выставка произведений Н. Н. Ге (к 100-летию Товарищества передвижных художественных выставок)" [All-Union exhibition of works by N. N. Ge (for the 100th anniversary of the Society for Travelling Art Exhibitions)]. Государственная Третьяковская Галерея. Материалы И Исследования (in Russian). Leningrad: Artist of the RSFSR: 236–241.
- Каменский, А.Б. (2018). Россия в XVIII столетии. Общество и память. Исследования по социальной истории и исторической памяти [Russia in the 18th century. Society and Memory. Studies on social history and historical memory] (in Russian). Saint petersburg: Aletheia. ISBN 978-5-906910-57-8.
- Карпова, Т.Л. (2000). Смысл лица. Русский портрет второй половины XIX века. Опыт самопознания личности [The meaning of the face. Russian portrait of the second half of the 19th century. The experience of self-cognition of personality] (in Russian). Saint Petersburg: Aletheia. ISBN 5-89329-331-2.
- Карпова, Т.Л. (2002). Николай Ге [Nikolai Ge]. Мастера живописи (in Russian). Moscow: Bely Gorod. ISBN 5-7793-0291-X.
- Карпова, Т.Л.; Капырина, С.Л. (2011). "Летопись жизни и творчества Николая Николаевича Ге" [Chronicle of the life and creative work of Nikolai Nikolayevich Ge] (PDF). Tretyakov Gallery (in Russian) (3): 52–63.
- Коваленская, Н.Н. (1965). "Н. Н. Ге" [N. N. Ge]. История русского искусства [History of Russian Art] (in Russian). Vol. 9, book 1. И. Э. Грабарь, В. С. Кеменов, В. Н. Лазарев. Moscow: Nauka. pp. 217–259.
- Ковальский, Л.М. (2014). "Из воспоминаний о Николае Николаевиче Ге" [From Memories of Nikolai Nikolaevich Ge]. Николай Ге. Вектор судьбы и творчества. Материалы международной научной конференции. Архивные публикации [Nikolai Ge. Vector of destiny and creativity. Materials of the international scientific conference. Archival publications] (PDF) (in Russian). Т. Л. Карпова. Moscow: Государственный институт искусствознания. pp. 338–351. ISBN 978-5-98287-082-7.
- Kostomarov, Mykola (1975). "Царевич Алексей Петрович. По поводу картины Н. Н. Ге (начало)" [Tsarevich Alexei Petrovich. Regarding the painting of N. N. Ge (beginning)]. Древняя И Новая Россия (in Russian). 1 (1): 30–54.
- Kostomarov, Mykola (1875). "Царевич Алексей Петрович. По поводу картины Н. Н. Ге (окончание)" [Tsarevich Alexei Petrovich. Regarding the painting of N. N. Ge (end)]. Древняя И Новая Россия (in Russian). 1 (2): 134–152.
- Круковская, С.М. (1982). В мире сокровищ [In the world of treasures] (in Russian). Tashkent: Издательство литературы и искусства имени Гафура Гуляма. p. 103.
- Лейтес, И.А. (1988). "Опыт исторической картины Н. Н. Ге" [Experience of historical painting of N. N. Ge]. Iskusstvo (in Russian) (3): 56–63.
- Леонтьева, О.Б. (2011). Историческая память и образы прошлого в российской культуре XIX — начале XX веков [Historical memory and images of the past in Russian culture of the 19th - early 20th centuries] (PDF) (in Russian). Samara: ООО «Книга». ISBN 978-5-93424-522-2.
- Лужецкая, А.Н. (1965). Техника масляной живописи русских мастеров с XVIII по начало XX века [Oil painting technique of Russian masters from the 18th to the beginning of the 20th century] (in Russian). Moscow: Iskusstvo.
- Матушинский, А.М. (1872). "Последние художественные выставки в Петербурге" [Latest art exhibitions in St. Petersburg]. The Russian Messenger (in Russian). 99: 769–837.
- Никитенко, Г.Ю. (2013). Дома и люди Васильевского острова [Houses and people of Vasilievsky Island] (in Russian). Moscow - Saint Petersburg: Центрполиграф. ISBN 978-5-227-04047-3.
- Repin, Ilya (1949). Далёкое близкое [The far and the near] (in Russian). К. И. Чуковский. Moscow - Leningrad: Iskusstvo.
- Рогинская, Ф.С. (1989). Товарищество передвижных художественных выставок [Society for Travelling Art Exhibitions] (in Russian). Moscow: Iskusstvo. ISBN 5-87685-054-3.
- Saltykov-Shchedrin, Mikhail (1970). "Первая русская передвижная художественная выставка" [First Russian Travelling Art Exhibition]. Собрание сочинений в 20 томах [Collected Works in 20 Volumes] (in Russian). Vol. 9. Moscow: Khudozhestvennaya Literatura. pp. 225–233.
- Сарабьянов, Д.В. (1955). Народно-освободительные идеи русской живописи второй половины XIX века [People's liberation ideas in Russian painting of the second half of the 19th century] (in Russian). Moscow: Iskusstvo.
- Селезнёва, Е.Л. (2006). "П. М. Третьяков и Всемирная парижская выставка 1878 года" [P. M. Tretyakov and the Paris World Fair in 1878] (PDF). Tretyakov Gallery (in Russian) (1): 22–27.
- Stasov, Vladimir (1904). Николай Николаевич Ге, его жизнь, произведения и переписка [Nikolai Nikolaevich Ge, his life, works and correspondence] (in Russian). Moscow: Типография товарищества К. Н. Кушнерев и Ко..
- Stasov, Vladimir (1950). Избранное: живопись, скульптура, графика [Favourites: painting, sculpture, graphics] (in Russian). Vol. 1 — Русское искусство. Moscow: Iskusstvo.
- Stasov, Vladimir (1952). Избранные сочинения: живопись, скульптура, музыка [Selected Works: Painting, Sculpture, Music] (in Russian). Vol. 1. Moscow: Iskusstvo.
- Stasov, Vladimir (1951). Избранное: живопись, скульптура, графика [Favourites: painting, sculpture, graphics] (in Russian). Vol. 2 — Искусство XIX века. Iskusstvo.
- Стернин, Г.Ю. (2007). Два века. Очерки русской художественной культуры [Two Centuries. Outlines of Russian Artistic Culture] (in Russian). Moscow: Галарт. ISBN 978-5-269-01052-6.
- Фёдорова, Н.Н. (1959). Петродворец [Petrodvorets] (in Russian). Leningrad: Lenizdat.
- Фурсикова, Е.Г. (2011). "Августейший коллекционер: штрихи к портрету великого князя Николая Константиновича" [The august collector: touches to the portrait of Grand Duke Nikolai Konstantinovich]. Константиновский Дворцово-парковый Ансамбль: Исследования И Материалы (Collection of Articles, 322 p.) (in Russian). Saint Petersburg: Президентская библиотека имени Б. Н. Ельцина: 260–276.
- Царёва, Е.Г. (2019). "Восточные ковры в русских коллекциях и интерьерах. Туркменские ковры в дворцах и коллекциях Санкт-Петербурга. XVIII—XIX вв" [Oriental carpets in Russian collections and interiors. Turkmen carpets in the palaces and collections of St Petersburg. 18th-19th cc.] (PDF). Русский Ориентализм (наука, Искусство, Коллекции) (in Russian). Saint Petersburg: МАЭ РАН: 137–170. ISBN 978-5-88431-380-4.
- Чистяков, П.П. (1953). Письма, записки, воспоминания [Letters, notes, memories] (in Russian). Э. М. Белютин, Н. М. Молева. Moscow: Iskusstvo.
- Чукчеева, М.А. (2017). "Формирование исторического жанра в России в 1860-е годы и творчество В. Г. Шварца" [The formation of the historical genre in Russia in the 1860s and the work of V. G. Shvarts]. Художественная Культура (in Russian) (1 (19)).
- Чукчеева, М.А. (2021). "Картина Н. Ге "Пётр I допрашивает царевича Алексея Петровича в Петергофе": исторические источники и восприятие современников" [Painting H. Ge "Peter the Great Interrogating the Tsarevich Alexei Petrovich at Peterhof": historical sources and perception of contemporaries] (PDF). Искусствознание (in Russian) (2): 172–201.
- Щёкотов, Н.М. (1943). Пётр I и царевич Алексей. Картина русского живописца Н. Н. Ге [Peter I and Tsarevich Alexei. Painting by Russian painter N. N. Ge] (PDF). Массовая библиотека «Искусство» (in Russian). Moscow - Leningrad: Iskusstvo.
- Eidelman, Natan (1973). Герцен против самодержавия. Секретная политическая история России XVIII—XIX веков и Вольная печать [Herzen against autocracy. The Secret Political History of Russia in the 18th and 19th centuries and the Free Press] (in Russian). Moscow: Мысль.
- Юденкова, Т.В. (2011). "Павел Михайлович Третьяков и Николай Николаевич Ге" [Pavel Mikhailovich Tretyakov and Nikolai Nikolayevich Ge] (PDF). Tretyakov Gallery (in Russian) (3): 20–31.
- Юденкова, Т.В. (2014). "П. М. Третьяков и Н. Н. Ге. К истории формирования монографии художника в галерее". Николай Ге. Вектор судьбы и творчества. Материалы международной научной конференции. Архивные публикации [Nikolai Ge. Vector of destiny and creativity. Materials of the international scientific conference. Archival publications] (PDF) (in Russian). Т. Л. Карпова. Moscow: Государственный институт искусствознания. pp. 77–102. ISBN 978-5-98287-082-7.
- Яковлева, Н.А. (2005). Историческая картина в русской живописи [Historical picture in Russian painting]. Энциклопедия мирового искусства (in Russian). Moscow: Bely Gorod. ISBN 5-7793-0898-5.
- Государственная Третьяковская галерея — каталог собрания [State Tretyakov Gallery - catalogue of the collection] (in Russian). Vol. 4: Живопись второй половины XIX века, book 1, А–М. Я. В. Брук, Л. И. Иовлева. Moscow: Красная площадь. 2001. ISBN 5-900743-56-X.
- Государственная Третьяковская галерея — каталог собрания [State Tretyakov Gallery - catalogue of the collection] (in Russian). Vol. 4: Живопись второй половины XIX века, book 2, Н–Я. Я. В. Брук, Л. И. Иовлева. Moscow: Красная площадь. 2006. ISBN 5-900743-22-5.
- Государственная Третьяковская галерея — каталог собрания [State Tretyakov Gallery - catalogue of the collection] (in Russian). Vol. 2: Рисунок XIX века, book 2, Г–И. Я. В. Брук, Л. И. Иовлева. Moscow: СканРус. 2013. ISBN 978-5-89580-042-3.
- Государственный Русский музей — Живопись, XVIII — начало XX века (каталог) [State Russian Museum - Painting, 18th - early 20th century (catalogue)] (in Russian). А. В. Губарев, Н. Н. Новоуспенский, В. А. Пушкарёв, Г. В. Смирнов. Leningrad: Aurora and Iskusstvo. 1980.
- Государственный Русский музей — каталог собрания [State Russian Museum - catalogue of the collection] (in Russian). Vol. 5: Живопись второй половины XIX века (А—И). Г. Н. Голдовский, В. А. Леняшин. Saint Petersburg: Palace Editions. 2014. ISBN 978-5-93332-507-9.
- Иллюстрированный каталог Художественного отдела Всероссийской выставки в Москве, 1882 г. [Illustrated catalogue of the Art Department of the All-Russian Exhibition in Moscow, 1882.] (in Russian). Н. П. Собко. Saint Petersburg: Publisher М. П. Боткин. 1882.
- Николай Николаевич Ге. Письма, статьи, критика, воспоминания современников [Nikolai Nikolaevich Ge. Letters, articles, criticism, memoirs of contemporaries] (in Russian). Н. Ю. Зограф. Moscow: Iskusstvo. 1978.
- Переписка И. Н. Крамского: Переписка с художниками [Correspondence of I. N. Kramskoi: Correspondence with artists] (in Russian). С. Н. Гольдштейн. Moscow: Iskusstvo. 1954.
- Письма И. Е. Репина. И. Е. Репин и В. В. Стасов. I. 1871—1876 [Letters of I. E. Repin. I. Е. Repin and V. V. Stasov. I. 1871-1876] (in Russian). А. К. Лебедев, Г. К. Бурова. Moscow - Leningrad: Iskusstvo. 1948.
- Письма художников Павлу Михайловичу Третьякову: 1870—1879 [Letters from artists to Pavel Mikhailovich Tretyakov: 1870-1879] (in Russian). Н. Г. Галкина, М. Н. Григорьева, Н. Л. Приймак. Moscow: Iskusstvo. 1968.
- Саратовский государственный художественный музей имени А. Н. Радищева. Русская живопись XVIII — начала XX века. Каталог [Saratov State Art Museum named after A. N. Radishchev. Russian painting of the 18th - early 20th century. Catalogue] (in Russian). Vol. 1. Е. И. Водонос, Г. Е. Фёдорова, Г. М. Кормакулина, Л. В. Пашкова. Moscow: Трилистник. 2004. ISBN 9785894800776.
- Товарищество передвижных художественных выставок. Письма, документы. 1869—1899 [Society for Travelling Art Exhibitions. Letters, documents. 1869-1899] (in Russian). В. В. Андреева, М. В. Астафьева, С. Н. Гольдштейн, Н. Л. Приймак. Moscow: Iskusstvo. 1987.
- Три века Санкт-Петербурга. Том 2: Девятнадцатый век. Книга 5: П—Р [Three Centuries of St Petersburg. Volume 2: The Nineteenth Century. Book 5: P-R] (in Russian). П. Е. Бухаркин. Филологический факультет Санкт-Петербургского государственного университета. 2006. p. 216. ISBN 5-8465-0052-8.
- Catalogue de la section russe à l'Exposition universelle de Paris. Paris: Lahure. 1878.
- London International Exhibition of 1873. Official catalogue. London: J. M. Johnson & Sons. 1873.
