= Monplaisir (surname) =

Monplaisir is a French surname. Notable people with the surname include:

- Hippolyte Monplaisir (1821–1877), French choreographer, dancer, and ballet master
- Sharon Monplaisir (born 1960), American fencer
