= Monplaisir Garden =

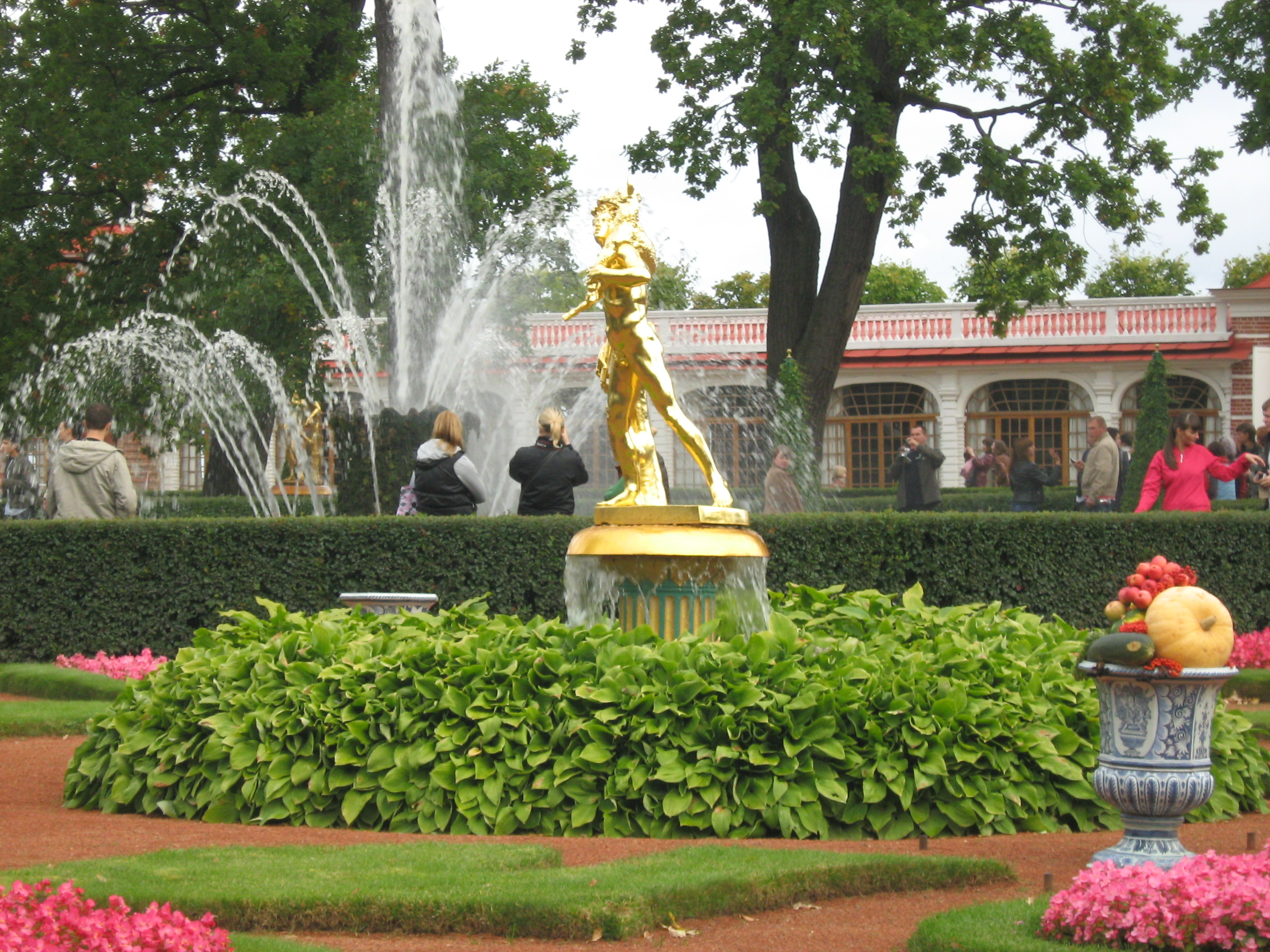
Monplaisir Garden

The Monplaisir Garden (Russian: сад Монплезир) is a garden by the Monplaisir Palace of the Peterhof Palace Complex, Russia.

The garden was laid out according to a sketch of Peter the Great during 1714-1716. The layout of the garden consists of four flower stalls (with a total area of 30x32 m), separated by crossing alleys. The main decorations of the garden are its fountains. The largest one is The Sheaf, in the center of the garden composition. It has a major main jet and twenty-four small inclined jets. This fountain marks the central point of the entire composition.

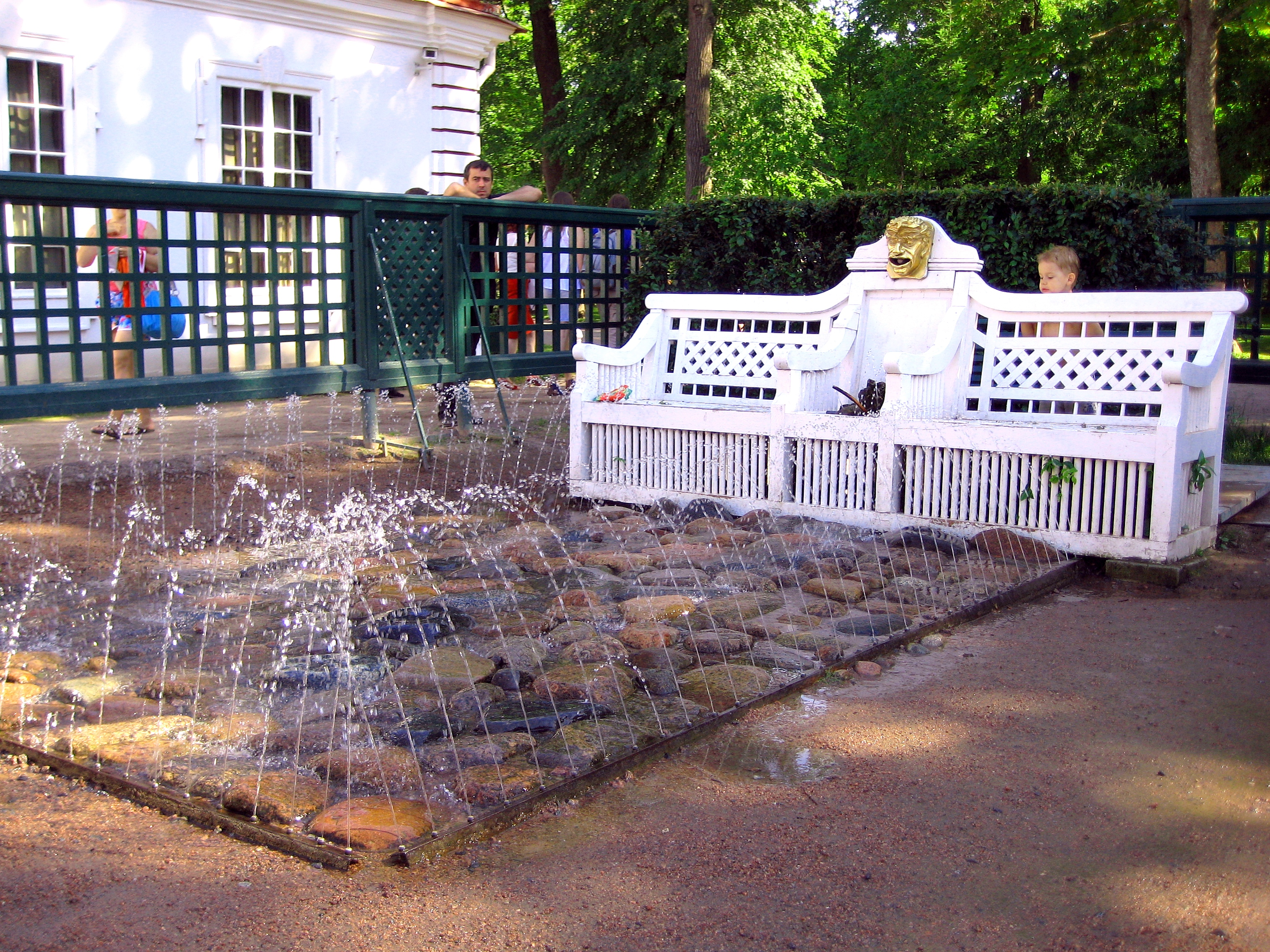
A prank fountain

Side alleys of the garden have a number of prank fountains ("фонтаны-шутихи"). Two of them are disguised as benches, named «Диванчики» (Divanchiki, "Little sofas"). The fountain is activated when one steps on a pavement in front of such a "bench", and the person will be sprinkled.
