= Monplaisir Palace =

Palace in Petergof, Saint Petersburg, Russia

Coordinates: 59.8872°N 29.9192°E

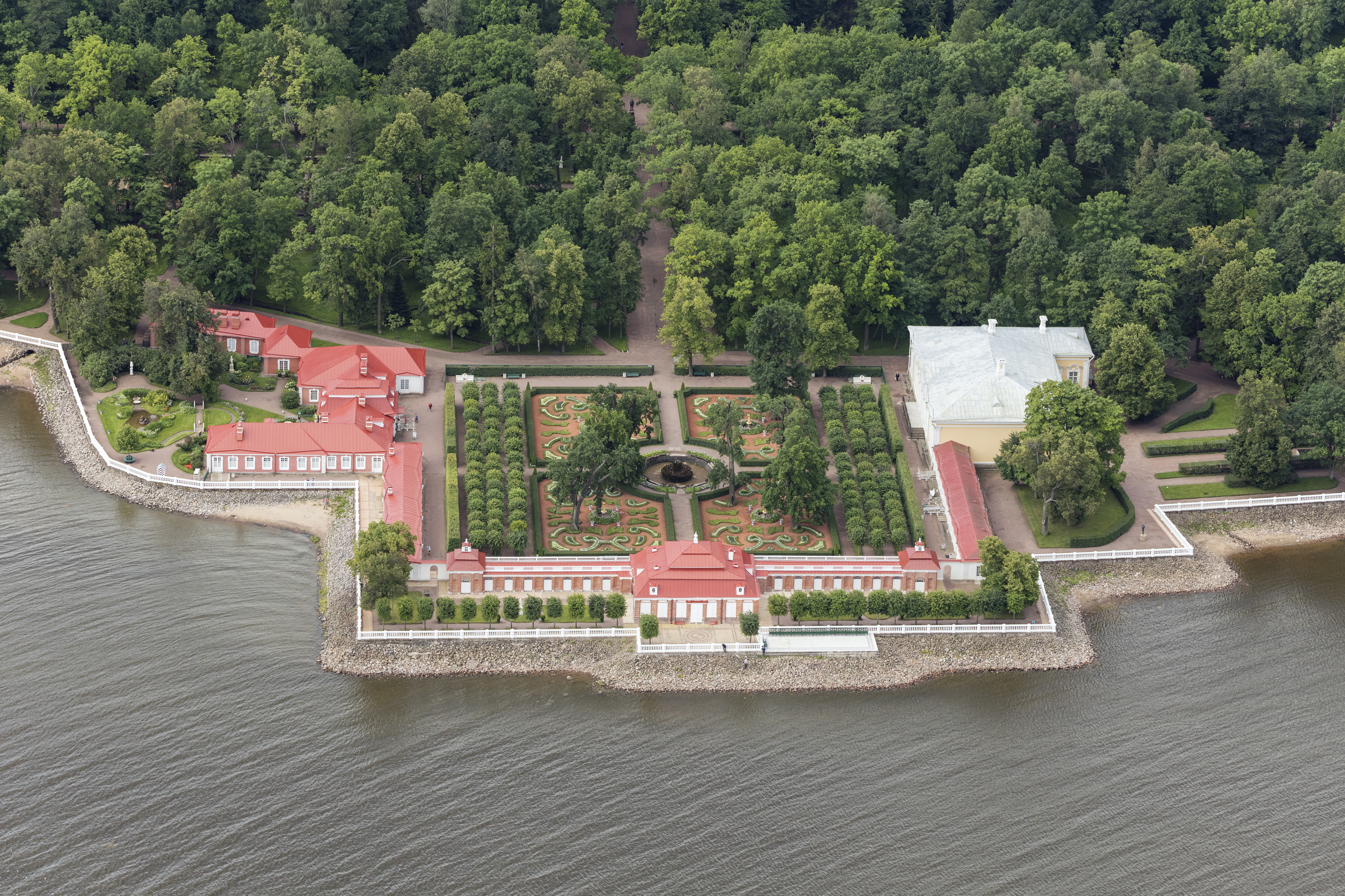
Aerial view of Monplaisir Palace

The Monplaisir Palace is part of the Peterhof Palace Complex, Russia.

== History ==
In 1714, Peter began construction of the Monplaisir Palace ("Monplaisir" means "my delight" in French) based on his own sketches. He "chalked out not only the site but also the inside layout, some elements of the decorative finish, etc". Based in a Dutch style, this was Peter's summer retreat (not to be confused with his Summer Palace) that he would use on his way coming and going from Europe through the harbour at Kronstadt. On the walls of this seacoast palace hung hundreds of paintings that Peter brought from Europe and allowed to weather Russian winters and the dampness of the sea without heat. In the seaward corner of his Monplaisir Palace, Peter made his Maritime Study, from which he could see Kronstadt Island to the left and St. Petersburg to the right. Later, he expanded his plans to include a vaster royal château of palaces and gardens further inland, on the model of Versailles which would become Peterhof Palace. The initial design of the palace and its garden was done by the French architect Jean-Baptiste Le Blond.

== See also ==
- Monplaisir Garden
