= Culture of Russia =

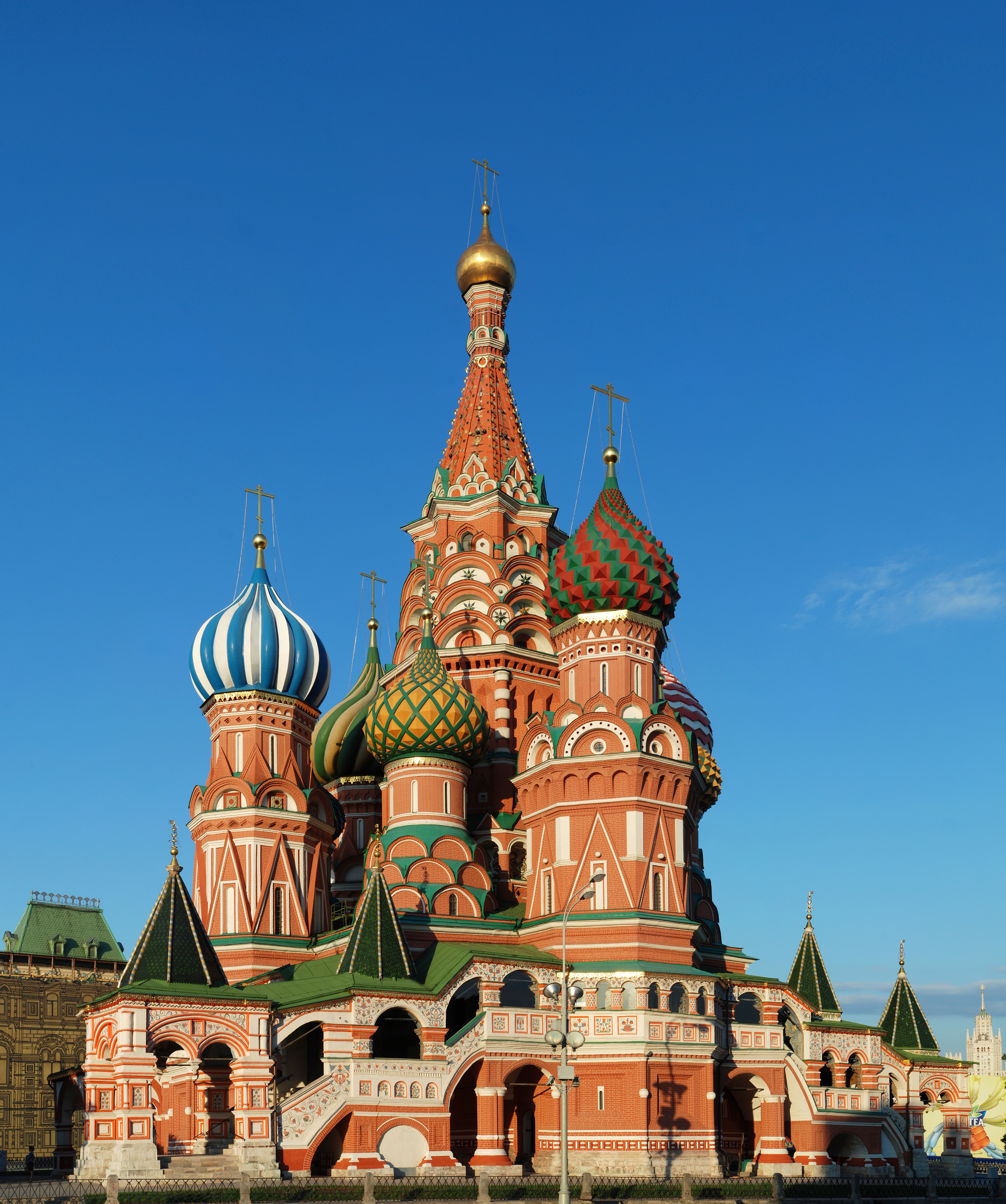
Saint Basil's Cathedral on Red Square in Moscow, most iconic Moscovite architecture that combined earlier Russian church and the Tatar east styles.

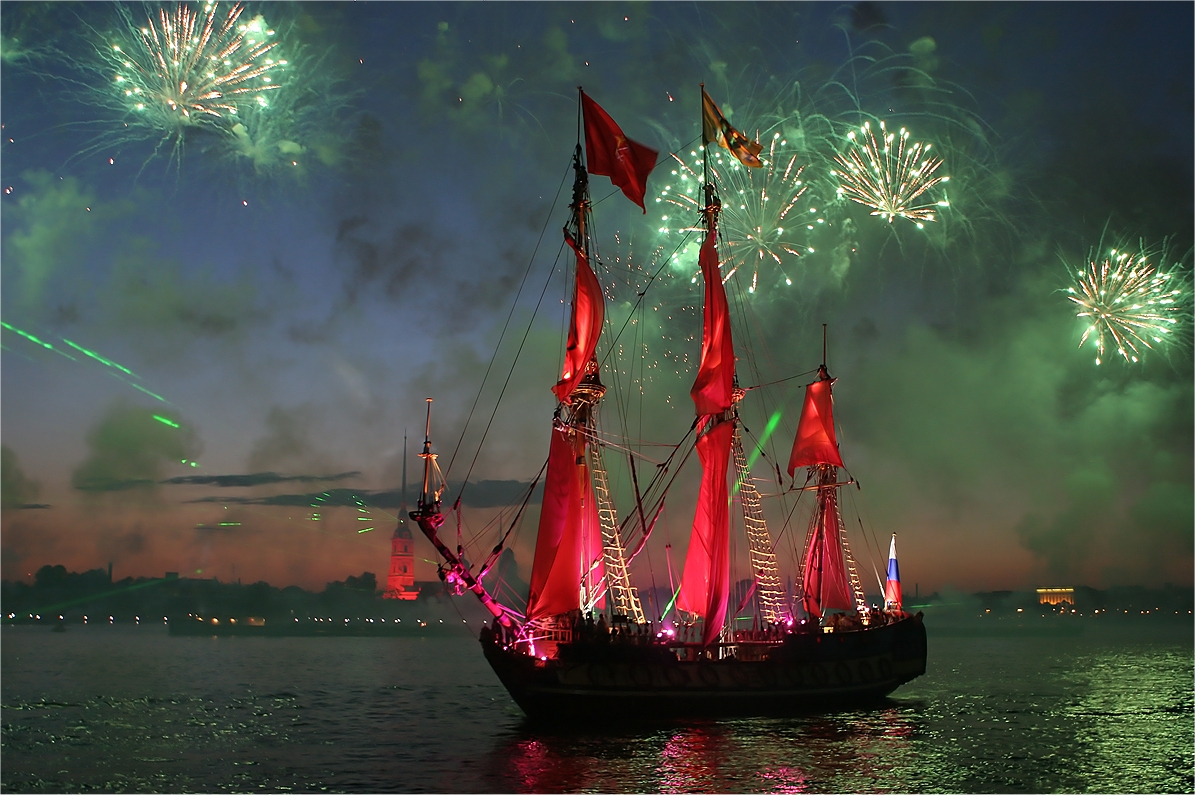
"Scarlet Sails" celebration in Saint Petersburg

Russian culture (Russian: Культура России, romanized: Kul'tura Rossii, IPA: [kʊlʲˈturə rɐˈsʲiɪ]) has been formed by the nation's history, its geographical location and its vast expanse, religious and social traditions, and both Eastern and Western influence. Cultural scientists believe that the influence of the East was fairly insignificant, since the Mongols did not coexist with the Russians during conquest, and the indigenous peoples were subjected to reverse cultural assimilation, unlike the Scandinavian and more western neighbors, which have become the main reason for the formation of modern culture among Russians. Russian writers and philosophers have played an important role in the development of European thought. The Russians have also greatly influenced classical music, ballet, theatre, painting, cinema and sport. The nation has also made pioneering contributions to science and technology and space exploration.

== History ==
The history of Russia begins with the histories of the East Slavs. The traditional start date of specifically Russian history is the establishment of the Rus' state in the north in the year 862, ruled by Varangians. In 882, Prince Oleg of Novgorod seized Kiev, uniting the northern and southern lands of the Eastern Slavs under one authority, moving the governance center to Kiev by the end of the 10th century, and maintaining northern and southern parts with significant autonomy from each other. The state adopted Christianity from the Byzantine Empire in 988, beginning the synthesis of Byzantine, Slavic and Scandinavian cultures that defined Russian culture for the next millennium. Kievan Rus' ultimately disintegrated as a state due to the Mongol invasions in 1237–1240. After the 13th century, Moscow emerged as a significant political and cultural force, driving the gathering of Russian territories. By the end of the 15th century, many of the petty principalities around Moscow had been united with the Grand Duchy of Moscow, which took full control of its own sovereignty under Ivan the Great.

Ivan the Terrible transformed the Grand Duchy into the Tsardom of Russia in 1547. However, the death of Ivan's son Feodor I without issue in 1598 created a succession crisis and led Russia into a period of chaos and civil war known as the Time of Troubles, ending with the coronation of Michael Romanov as the first Tsar of the Romanov dynasty in 1613. During the rest of the seventeenth century, Russia completed the exploration and conquest of Siberia, claiming lands as far as the Pacific Ocean by the end of the century. Domestically, Russia faced numerous uprisings of the various ethnic groups under their control, as exemplified by the Cossack leader Stenka Razin, who led a revolt in 1670–1671. In 1721, in the wake of the Great Northern War, Tsar Peter the Great renamed the state as the Russian Empire; he is also noted for establishing St. Petersburg as the new capital of his Empire, and for his introducing Western European culture to Russia. In 1762, Russia came under the control of Catherine the Great, who continued the westernizing policies of Peter the Great, and ushered in the era of the Russian Enlightenment. Catherine's grandson, Alexander I, repulsed an invasion by the French Emperor Napoleon, leading Russia into the status of one of the great powers.

Peasant revolts intensified during the nineteenth century, culminating with Alexander II abolishing Russian serfdom in 1861. In the following decades, reform efforts such as the Stolypin reforms of 1906–1914, the constitution of 1906, and the State Duma (1906–1917) attempted to open and liberalize the economy and political system, but the emperors refused to relinquish autocratic rule and resisted sharing their power. A combination of economic breakdown, mismanagement over Russia's involvement in World War I, and discontent with the autocratic system of government triggered the Russian Revolution in 1917. The end of the monarchy initially brought into office a coalition of liberals and moderate socialists, but their failed policies led to the October Revolution. In 1922, Soviet Russia, along with the Ukrainian SSR, Byelorussian SSR, and Transcaucasian SFSR signed the Treaty on the Creation of the USSR, officially merging all four republics to form the Soviet Union as a single state. Between 1922 and 1991 the history of Russia essentially became the history of the Soviet Union. During this period, the Soviet Union was one of the victors in World War II after recovering from a surprise invasion in 1941 by Nazi Germany and its collaborators, which had previously signed a non-aggression pact with the Soviet Union. The Soviet Union's network of satellite states in Eastern Europe, which were brought into its sphere of influence in the closing stages of World War II, helped the country become a superpower competing with fellow superpower the United States and other Western countries in the Cold War.

By the mid-1980s, with the weaknesses of Soviet economic and political structures becoming acute, Mikhail Gorbachev embarked on major reforms, which eventually led to the weakening of the communist party and dissolution of the Soviet Union, leaving Russia again on its own and marking the start of the history of post-Soviet Russia. The Russian Soviet Federative Socialist Republic renamed itself as the Russian Federation and became the primary successor state to the Soviet Union. Russia retained its nuclear arsenal but lost its superpower status. Scrapping the central planning and state-ownership of property of the Soviet era in the 1990s, new leaders, led by President Vladimir Putin, took political and economic power after 2000 and engaged in an assertive foreign policy. Coupled with economic growth, Russia has since regained significant global status as a world power. Russia's 2014 annexation of the Crimean Peninsula led to economic sanctions imposed by the United States and the European Union. Russia's 2022 invasion of Ukraine led to significantly expanded sanctions. Under Putin's leadership, corruption in Russia is rated as the worst in Europe, and Russia's human rights situation has been increasingly criticized by international observers.

== Language and literature ==
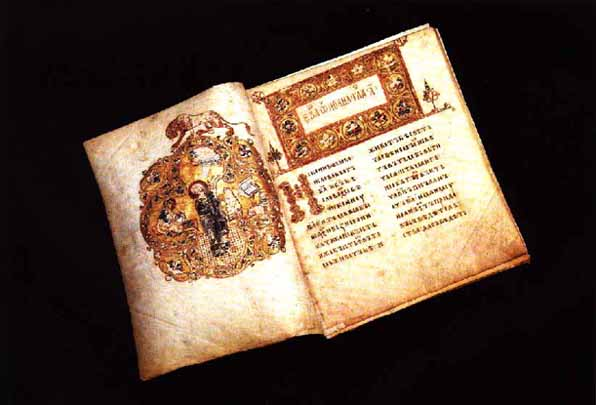
The Ostromir Gospels, the second oldest East Slavic book known; 1056 AD; Russian National Library (Saint Petersburg)

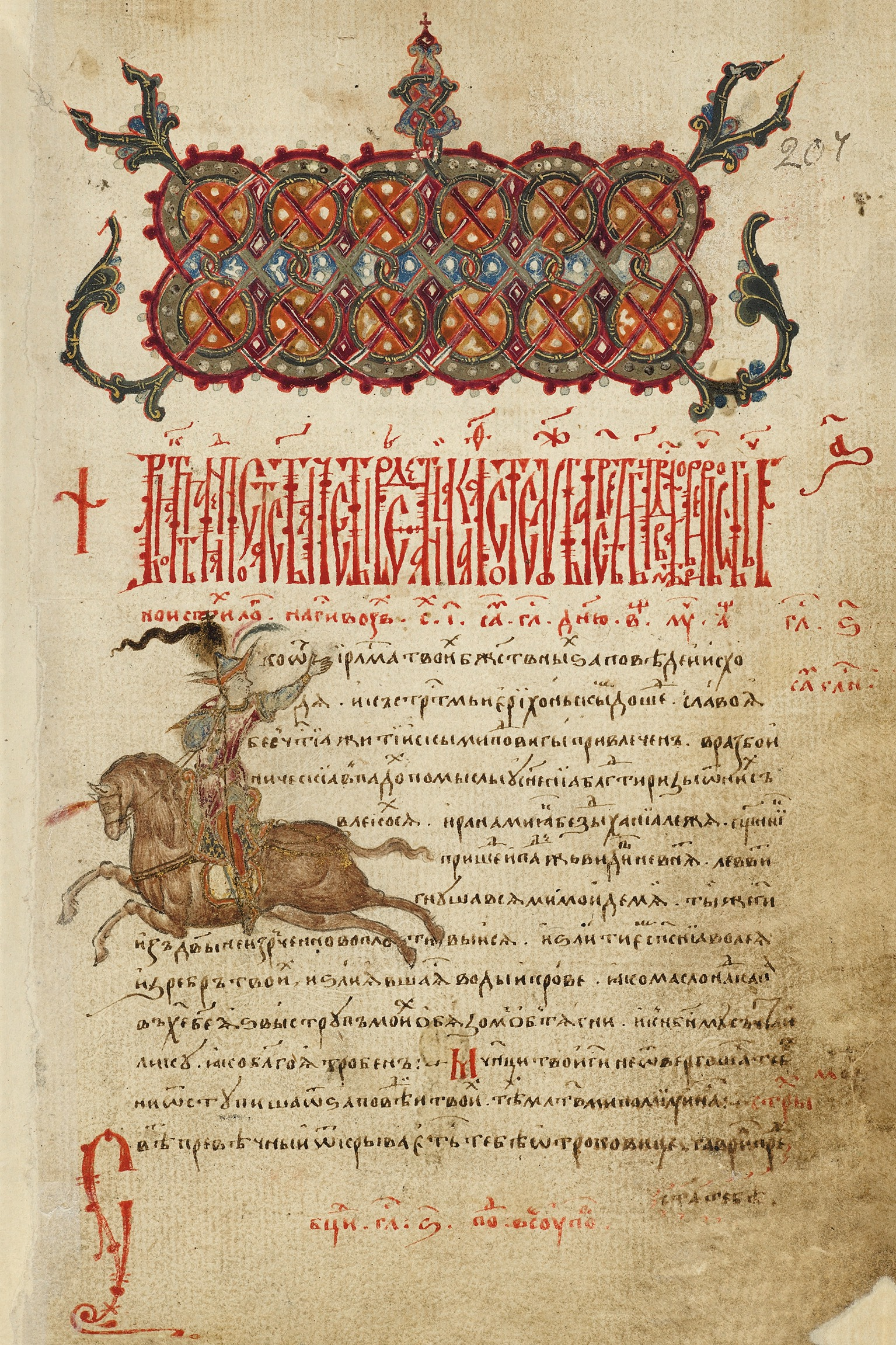
Page of a Russian illuminated manuscript; 1485–1490

Russia's 160 ethnic groups speak some 100 languages. According to the 2002 census, 142.6 million people speak Russian, followed by Tatar with 5.3 million and Ukrainian with 1.8 million speakers. Russian is the only official state language, but the Constitution gives the individual republics the right to make their native language co-official next to Russian. Despite its wide dispersal, the Russian language is homogeneous throughout Russia. Russian is the most geographically widespread language of Eurasia and the most widely spoken Slavic language. Russian belongs to the Indo-European language family and is one of the living members of the East Slavic languages; the others being Belarusian and Ukrainian (and possibly Rusyn). Written examples of Old East Slavic (Old Russian) are attested from the 10th century onwards.

Over a quarter of the world's scientific literature is published in Russian. Russian is also applied as a means of coding and storage of universal knowledge—60–70% of all world information is published in the English and Russian languages. The language is one of the six official languages of the United Nations.

=== Folklore ===
Russian folklore takes its roots in the pagan beliefs of ancient Slavs, which is nowadays still represented in the Russian folklore. Epic Russian bylinas are also an important part of Slavic mythology. The oldest bylinas of Kievan cycle were recorded in the Russian North, especially in Karelia, where most of the Finnish national epic Kalevala was recorded as well.

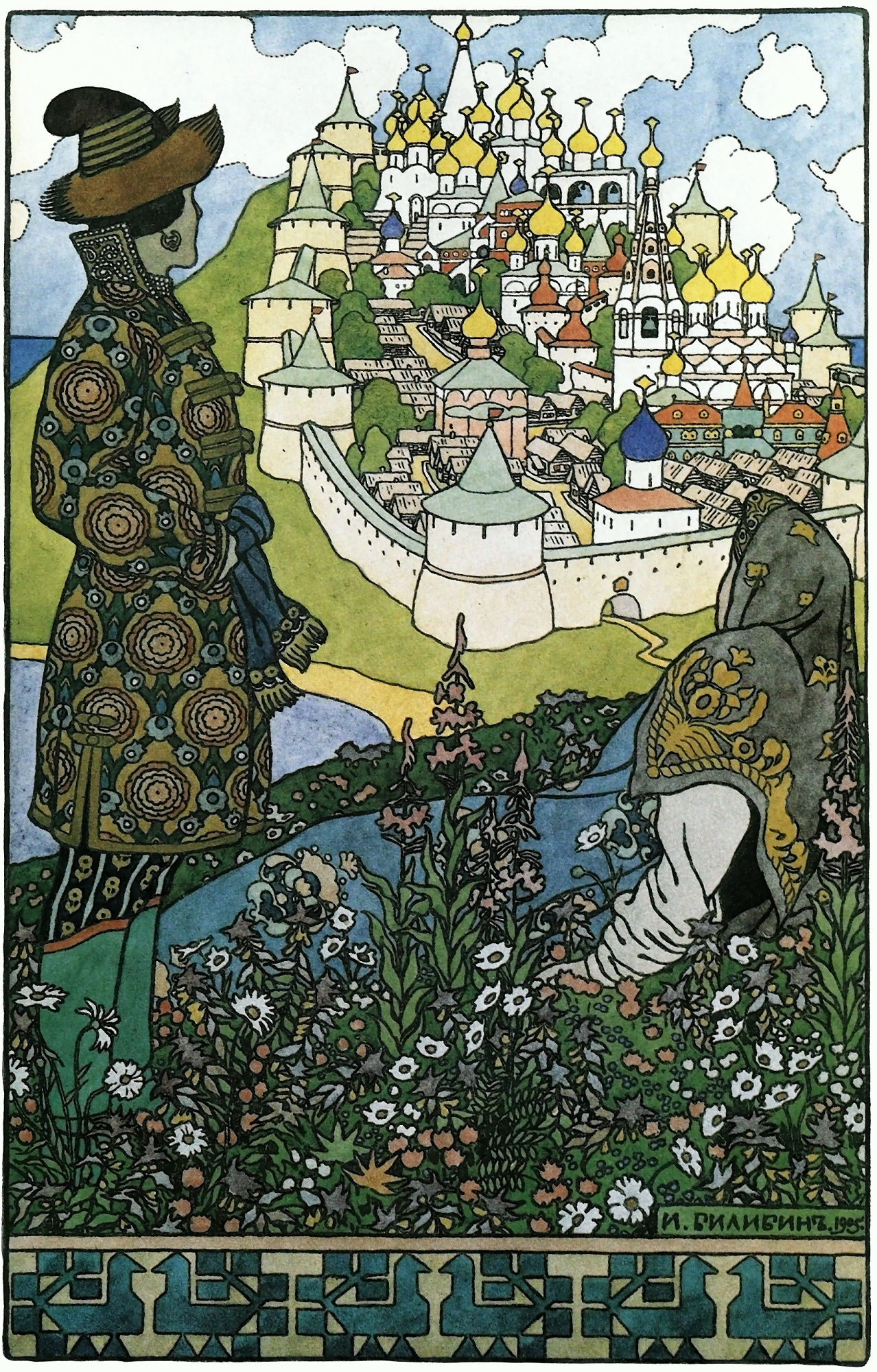
Buyan by Ivan Bilibin

Many Russian fairy tales and bylinas were adapted for Russian animations, or for feature movies by famous directors like Aleksandr Ptushko (Ilya Muromets, Sadko) and Aleksandr Rou (Morozko, Vasilisa the Beautiful). Some Russian poets, including Pyotr Yershov and Leonid Filatov, created a number of well-known poetical interpretations of classical Russian fairy tales, and in some cases, like that of Alexander Pushkin, also created fully original fairy tale poems that became very popular.

Folklorists today consider the 1920s the Soviet Union's golden age of folklore. The struggling new government, which had to focus its efforts on establishing a new administrative system and building up the nation's backwards economy, could not be bothered with attempting to control literature, so studies of folklore thrived. There were two primary trends of folklore study during the decade: the formalist and Finnish schools. Formalism focused on the artistic form of ancient byliny and faerie tales, specifically their use of distinctive structures and poetic devices. The Finnish school was concerned with connections amongst related legends of various Eastern European regions. Finnish scholars collected comparable tales from multiple locales and analyzed their similarities and differences, hoping to trace these epic stories' migration paths.

Emblem of the Ministry of Culture of Russia. The image of the crowned double eagle and the central crown which is connected with the other two crowns is often used as a pictorial example of Russia's cultural nature. One crowned head looks to Europe and reflects the Western European element in Russian culture, the other looks to Asia and symbolizes the Asian Oriental element in Russia. Both are connected to a big third crown. Russian culture is connected with European and Asian cultures and was influenced by both.

Once Joseph Stalin came to power and put his first five-year plan into motion in 1928, the Soviet government began to criticize and censor folklore studies. Stalin and the Soviet regime repressed folklore, believing that it supported the old tsarist system and a capitalist economy. They saw it as a reminder of the backward Russian society that the Bolsheviks were working to surpass. To keep folklore studies in check and prevent "inappropriate" ideas from spreading amongst the masses, the government created the RAPP – the Russian Association of Proletarian Writers. The RAPP specifically focused on censoring fairy tales and children's literature, believing that fantasies and "bourgeois nonsense" harmed the development of upstanding Soviet citizens. Fairy tales were removed from bookshelves and children were encouraged to read books focusing on nature and science. RAPP eventually increased its levels of censorship and became the Union of Soviet Writers in 1932.

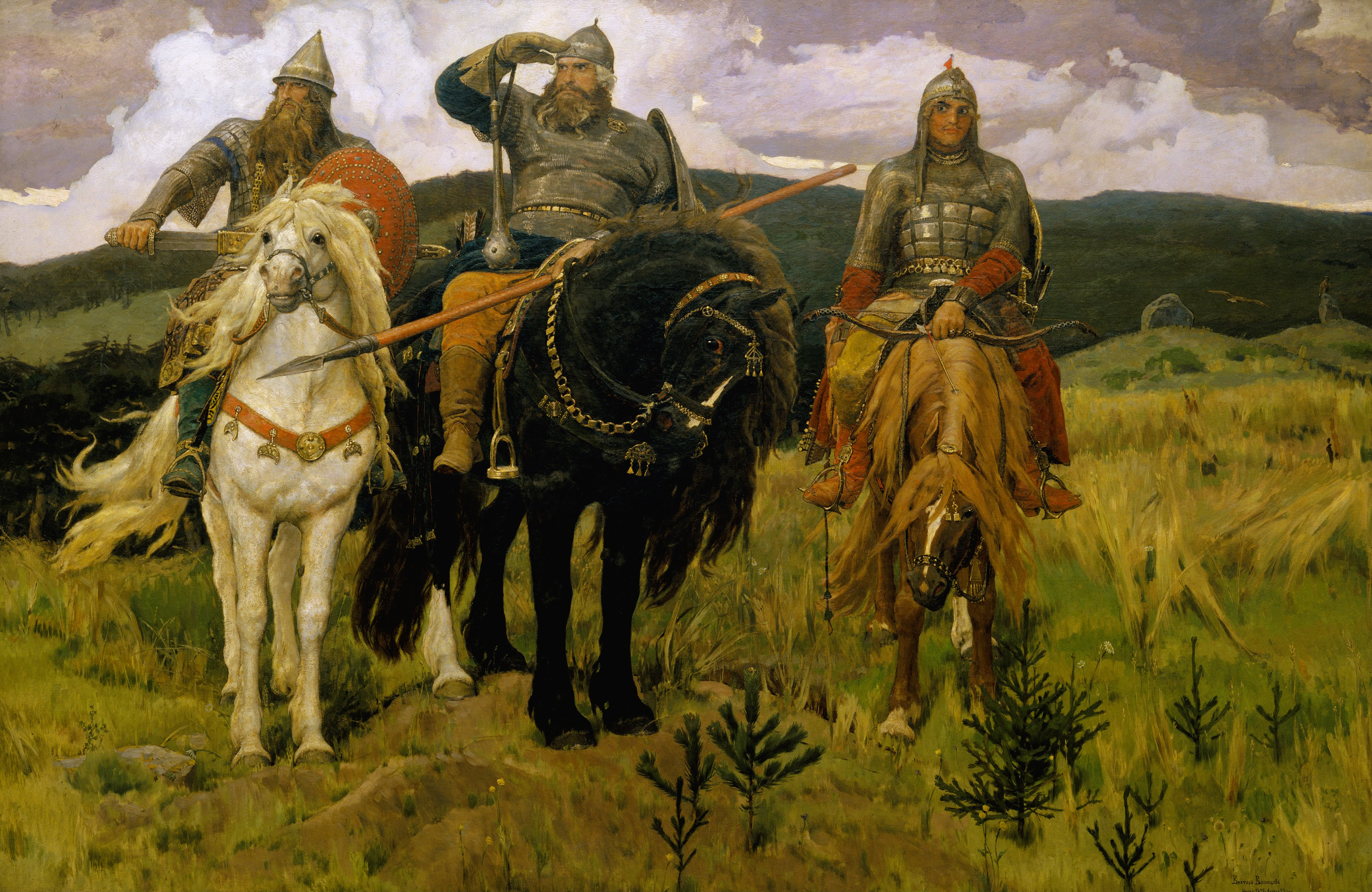
Bogatyrs by Viktor Vasnetsov. The three heroes of Russian mythology: (l-r) Dobrynya Nikitich, Ilya Muromets and Alyosha Popovich

In order to continue researching and analyzing folklore, intellectuals needed to justify its worth to the Communist regime. Otherwise, collections of folklore, along with all other literature deemed useless for the purposes of Stalin's Five Year Plan, would be an unacceptable realm of study. In 1934, Maksim Gorky gave a speech to the Union of Soviet Writers arguing that folklore could, in fact, be consciously used to promote Communist values. Apart from expounding on the artistic value of folklore, he stressed that traditional legends and fairy tales showed ideal, community-oriented characters, which exemplified the model Soviet citizen. Folklore, with many of its conflicts based on the struggles of a labor-oriented lifestyle, was relevant to Communism as it could not have existed without the direct contribution of the working classes. Also, Gorky explained that folklore characters expressed high levels of optimism, and therefore could encourage readers to maintain a positive mindset, especially as their lives changed with the further development of Communism.

Yuri Sokolov, the head of the folklore section of the Union of Soviet Writers also promoted the study of folklore by arguing that folklore had originally been the oral tradition of the working people, and consequently could be used to motivate and inspire collective projects amongst the present-day proletariat. Characters throughout traditional Russian folktales often found themselves on a journey of self-discovery, a process that led them to value themselves not as individuals, but rather as a necessary part of a common whole. The attitudes of such legendary characters paralleled the mindset that the Soviet government wished to instill in its citizens. He also pointed out the existence of many tales that showed members of the working class outsmarting their cruel masters, again working to prove folklore's value to Soviet ideology and the nation's society at large. Convinced by Gorky and Sokolov's arguments, the Soviet government and the Union of Soviet Writers began collecting and evaluating folklore from across the country. The Union handpicked and recorded particular stories that, in their eyes, sufficiently promoted the collectivist spirit and showed the Soviet regime's benefits and progress. It then proceeded to redistribute copies of approved stories throughout the population. Meanwhile, local folklore centers arose in all major cities. Responsible for advocating a sense of Soviet nationalism, these organizations ensured that the media published appropriate versions of Russian folktales in a systematic fashion.

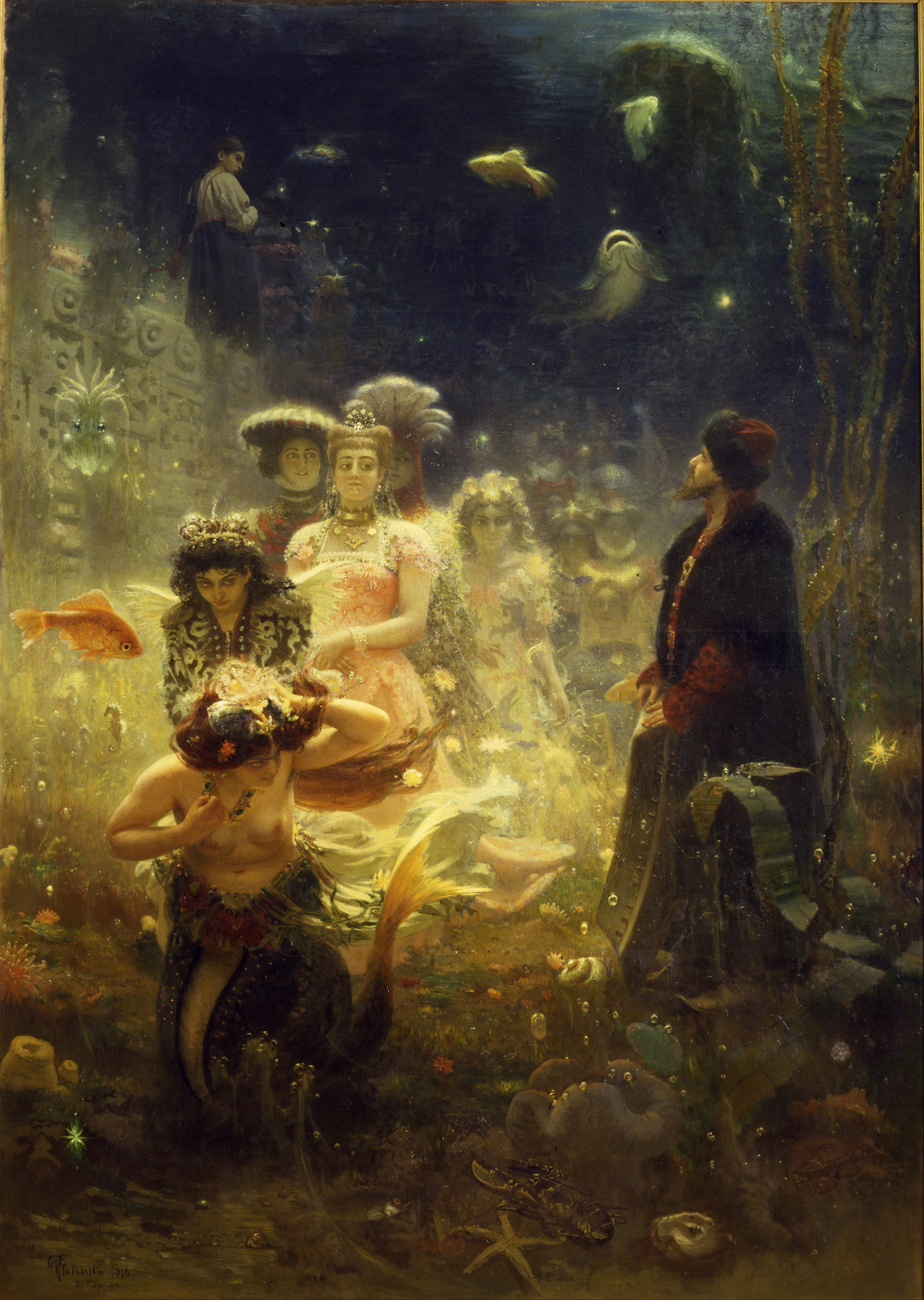
Sadko by Ilya Repin

Apart from circulating government-approved fairy tales and byliny that already existed, during Stalin's rule authors parroting appropriate Soviet ideologies wrote Communist folktales and introduced them to the population. These contemporary folktales combined the structures and motifs of the old byliny with contemporary life in the Soviet Union. Called noviny, these new tales were considered the renaissance of the Russian epic. Folklorists were called upon to teach modern folksingers the conventional style and structure of the traditional byliny. They also explained to the performers the appropriate types of Communist ideology that should be represented in the new stories and songs As the performers of the day were often poorly educated, they needed to obtain a thorough understanding of Marxist ideology before they could be expected to impart folktales to the public in a manner that suited the Soviet government. Besides undergoing extensive education, many folk performers traveled throughout the nation in order to gain insight into the lives of the working class, and thus communicate their stories more effectively. Due to their crucial role in spreading Communist ideals throughout the Soviet Union, eventually some of these performers became highly valued members of Soviet society. A number of them, despite their illiteracy, were even elected as members of the Union of Soviet Writers.

These new Soviet fairy tales and folk songs primarily focused on the contrasts between a miserable life in old tsarist Russia and an improved one under Stalin's leadership. Their characters represented identities for which Soviet citizens should strive, exemplifying the traits of the "New Soviet Man". The heroes of Soviet tales were meant to portray a transformed and improved version of the average citizen, giving the reader a clear goal for an ideal community-oriented self that the future he or she was meant to become. These new folktales replaced magic with technology, and supernatural forces with Stalin. Instead of receiving essential advice from a mythical being, the protagonist would be given advice from omniscient Stalin. If the character followed Stalin's divine advice, he could be assured success in all his endeavors and a complete transformation into the "New Soviet Man". The villains of these contemporary fairy tales were the Whites and their leader Idolisce, "the most monstrous idol", who was the equivalent of the tsar. Descriptions of the Whites in noviny mirrored those of the Tartars in byliny. In these new stories, the Whites were incompetent, stagnant capitalists, while the Soviet citizens became invincible heroes.

Once Stalin died in March 1953, folklorists of the period quickly abandoned the new folktales. Written by individual authors and performers, noviny did not come from the oral traditions of the working class. Consequently, today they are considered pseudo-folklore, rather than genuine Soviet (or Russian) folklore. Without any true connection to the masses, there was no reason noviny should be considered anything other than contemporary literature. Specialists decided that attempts to represent contemporary life through the structure and artistry of the ancient epics could not be considered genuine folklore. Stalin's name has been omitted from the few surviving pseudo-folktales of the period. Instead of considering folklore under Stalin a renaissance of the traditional Russian epic, today it is generally regarded as a period of restraint and falsehood.

=== Literature ===
Russian literature is considered to be among the world's most influential and developed. It can be traced to the Middle Ages, when epics and chronicles in Old East Slavic were composed. By the Age of Enlightenment, literature had grown in importance, with works from Mikhail Lomonosov, Denis Fonvizin, Gavrila Derzhavin, and Nikolay Karamzin. From the early 1830s, during the Golden Age of Russian Poetry, literature underwent an astounding golden age in poetry, prose and drama. Romanticism permitted a flowering of poetic talent: Vasily Zhukovsky and later his protégé Alexander Pushkin came to the fore. Following Pushkin's footsteps, a new generation of poets were born, including Mikhail Lermontov, Nikolay Nekrasov, Aleksey Konstantinovich Tolstoy, Fyodor Tyutchev and Afanasy Fet.

The first great Russian novelist was Nikolai Gogol. Then came Ivan Turgenev, who mastered both short stories and novels. Fyodor Dostoevsky and Leo Tolstoy soon became internationally renowned. Ivan Goncharov is remembered mainly for his novel Oblomov. Mikhail Saltykov-Shchedrin wrote prose satire, while Nikolai Leskov is best remembered for his shorter fiction. In the second half of the century Anton Chekhov excelled in short stories and became a leading dramatist. Other important 19th-century developments included the fabulist Ivan Krylov, non-fiction writers such as the critic Vissarion Belinsky, and playwrights such as Aleksandr Griboyedov and Aleksandr Ostrovsky. The beginning of the 20th century ranks as the Silver Age of Russian Poetry. This era had poets such as Alexander Blok, Anna Akhmatova, Boris Pasternak, Konstantin Balmont, Marina Tsvetaeva, Vladimir Mayakovsky, and Osip Mandelshtam. It also produced some first-rate novelists and short-story writers, such as Aleksandr Kuprin, Nobel Prize winner Ivan Bunin, Leonid Andreyev, Yevgeny Zamyatin, Dmitry Merezhkovsky and Andrei Bely.

After the Russian Revolution of 1917, Russian literature split into Soviet and white émigré parts. In the 1930s, Socialist realism became the predominant trend in Russia. Its leading figure was Maxim Gorky, who laid the foundations of this style. Mikhail Bulgakov was one of the leading writers of the Soviet era. Nikolay Ostrovsky's novel How the Steel Was Tempered has been among the most successful works of Russian literature. Influential émigré writers include Vladimir Nabokov, and Isaac Asimov; who was considered one of the "Big Three" science fiction writers. Some writers dared to oppose Soviet ideology, such as Nobel Prize-winning novelist Aleksandr Solzhenitsyn, who wrote about life in the Gulag camps.

At the beginning of the 21st century, the most discussed figures, postmodernists Victor Pelevin and Vladimir Sorokin remained the leading Russian writers.

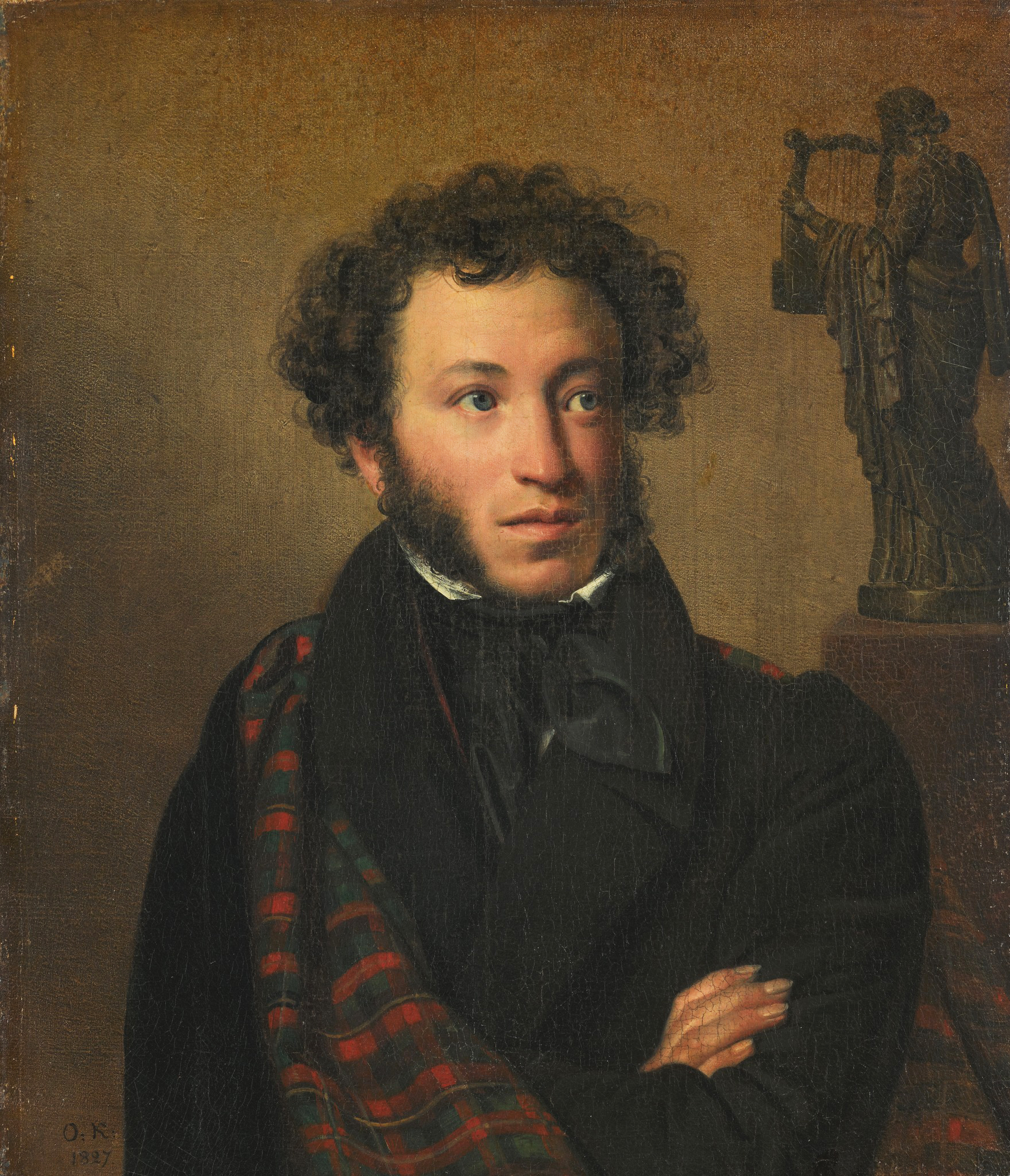
Pushkin

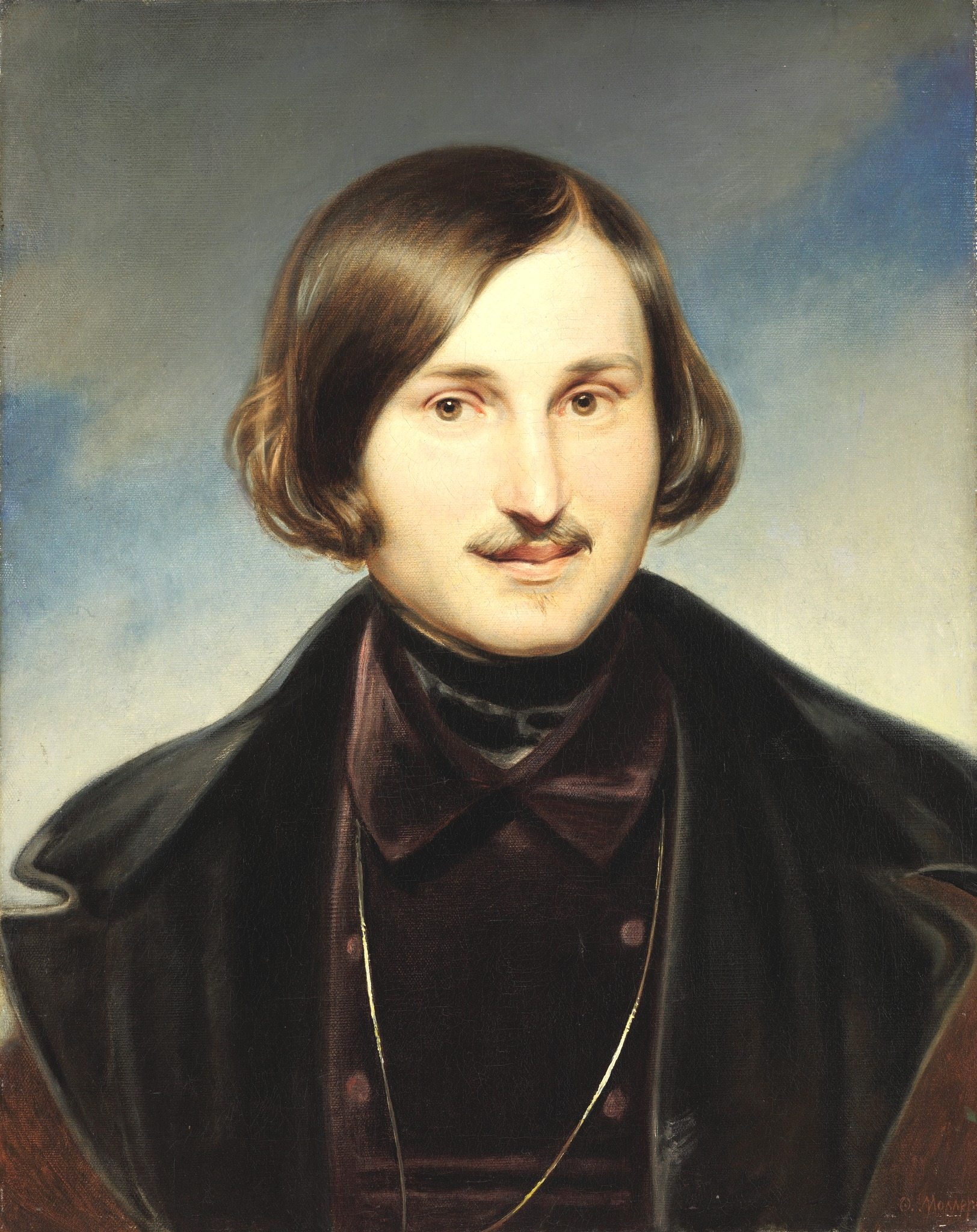
Gogol

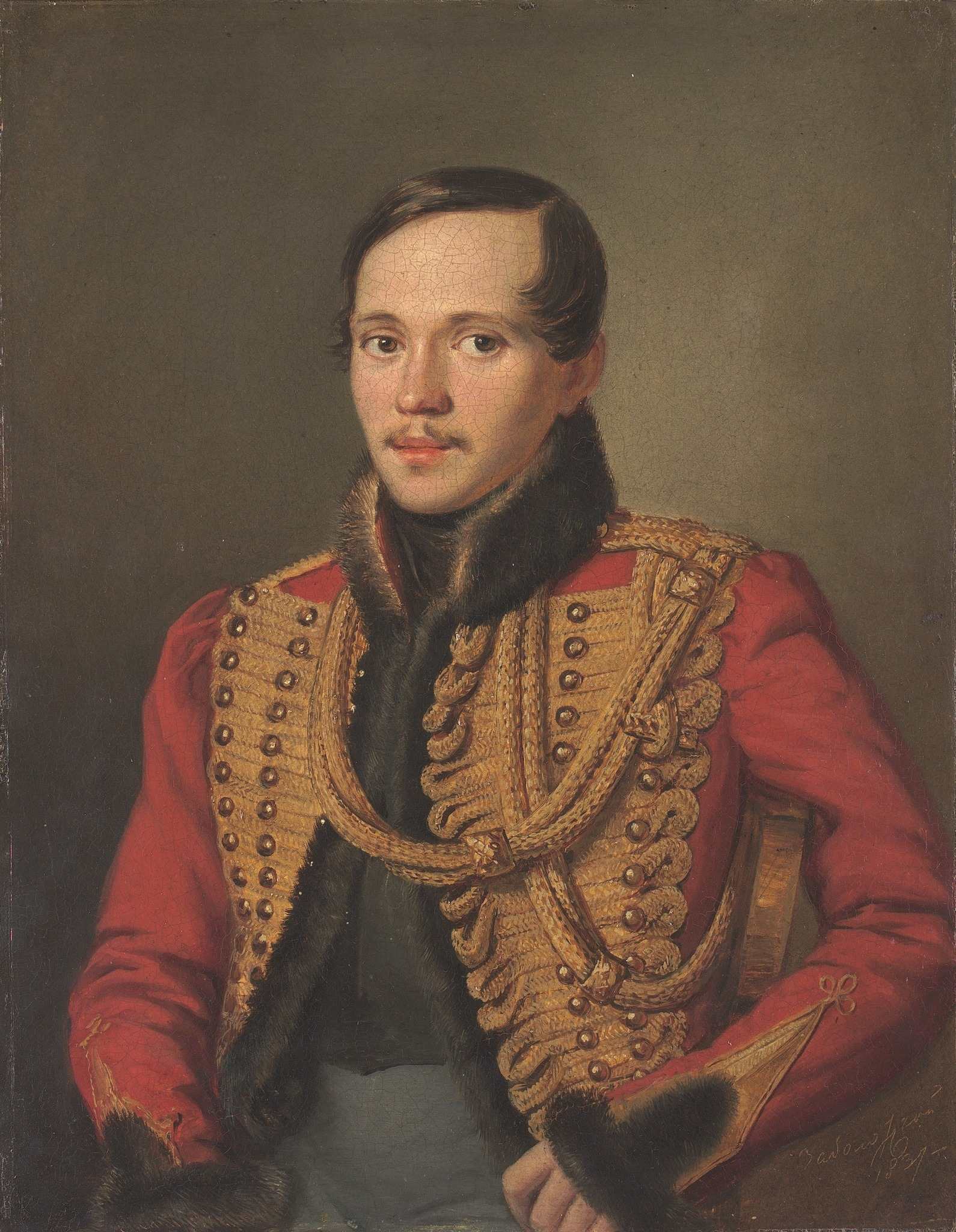
Lermontov

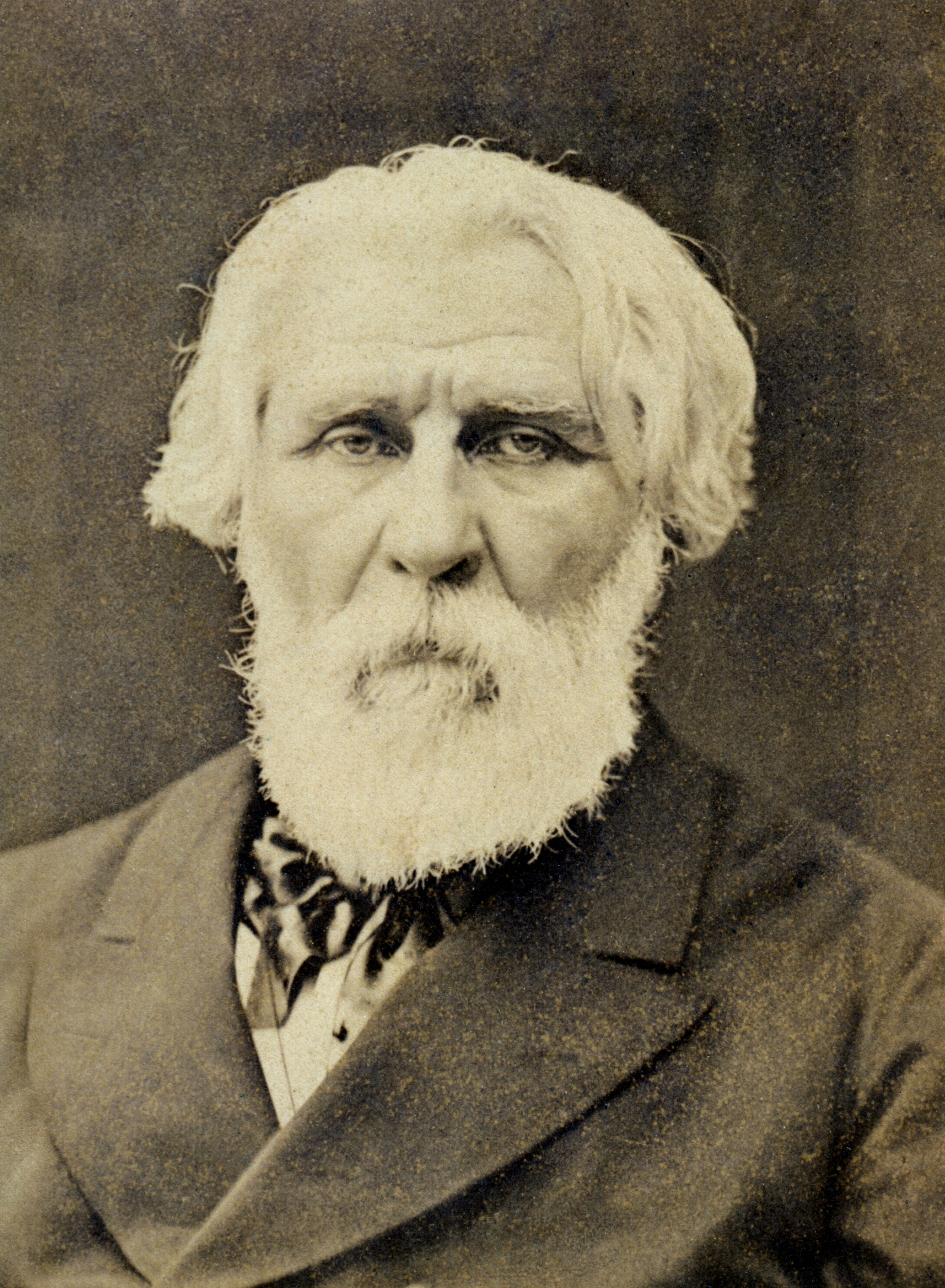
Turgenev

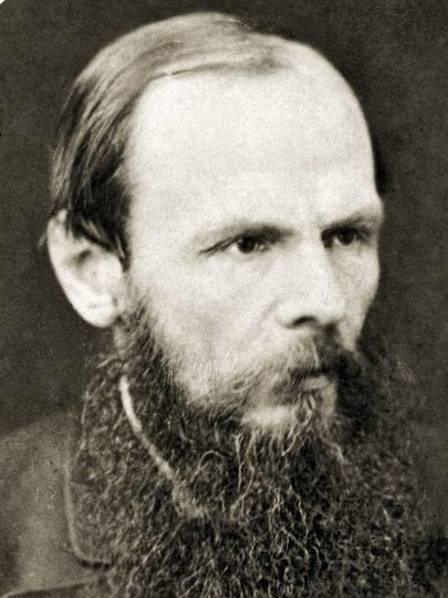
Dostoevsky

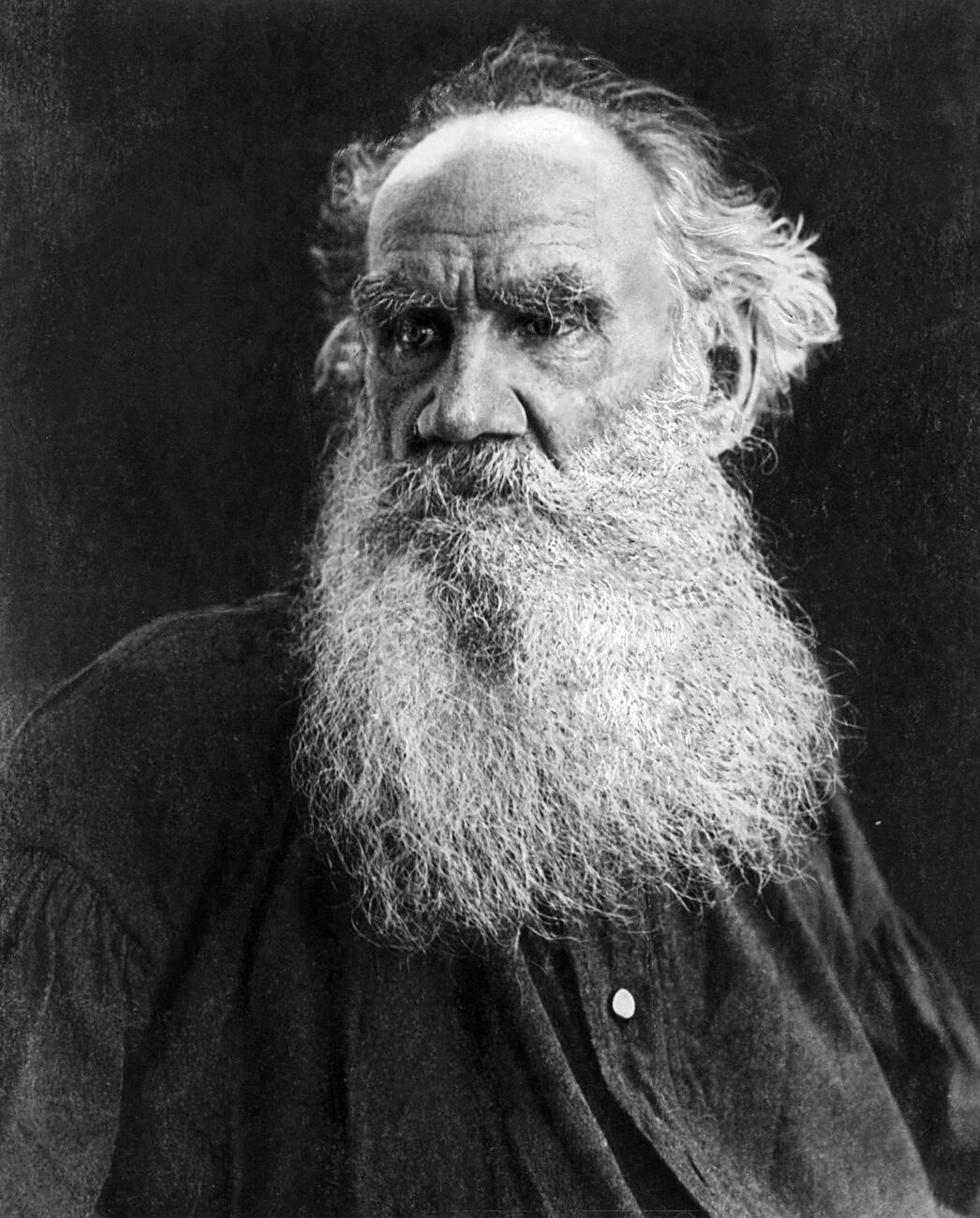
Tolstoy

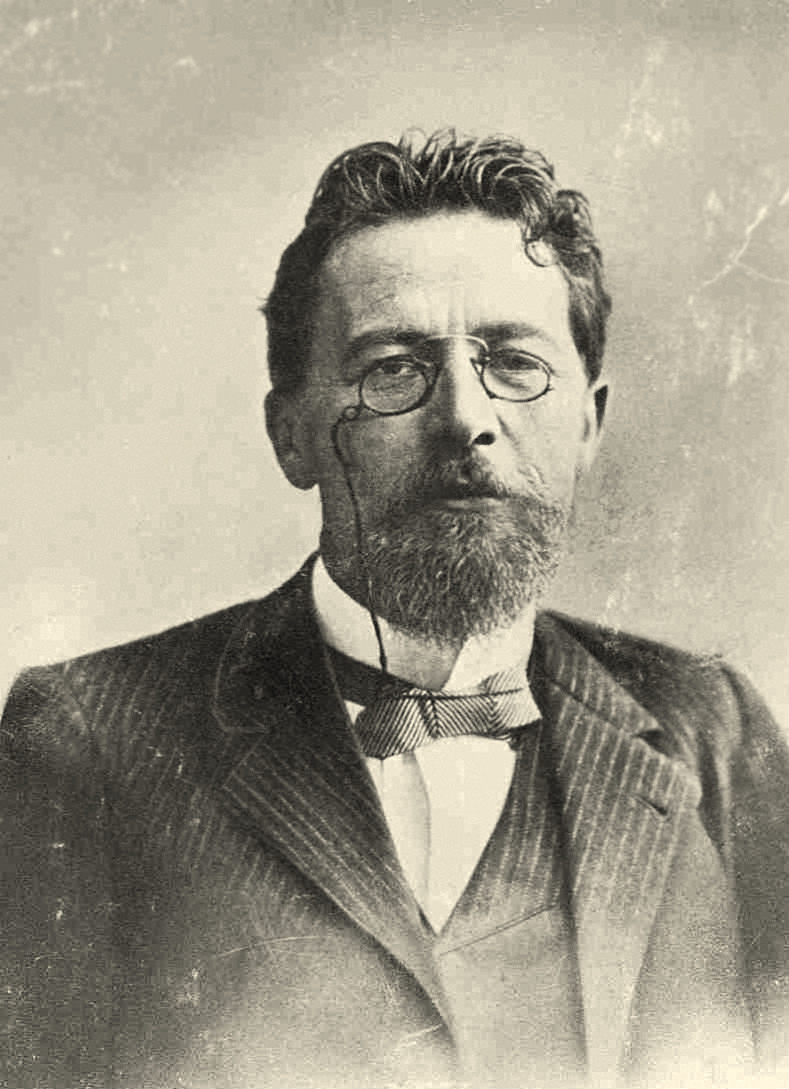
Chekhov

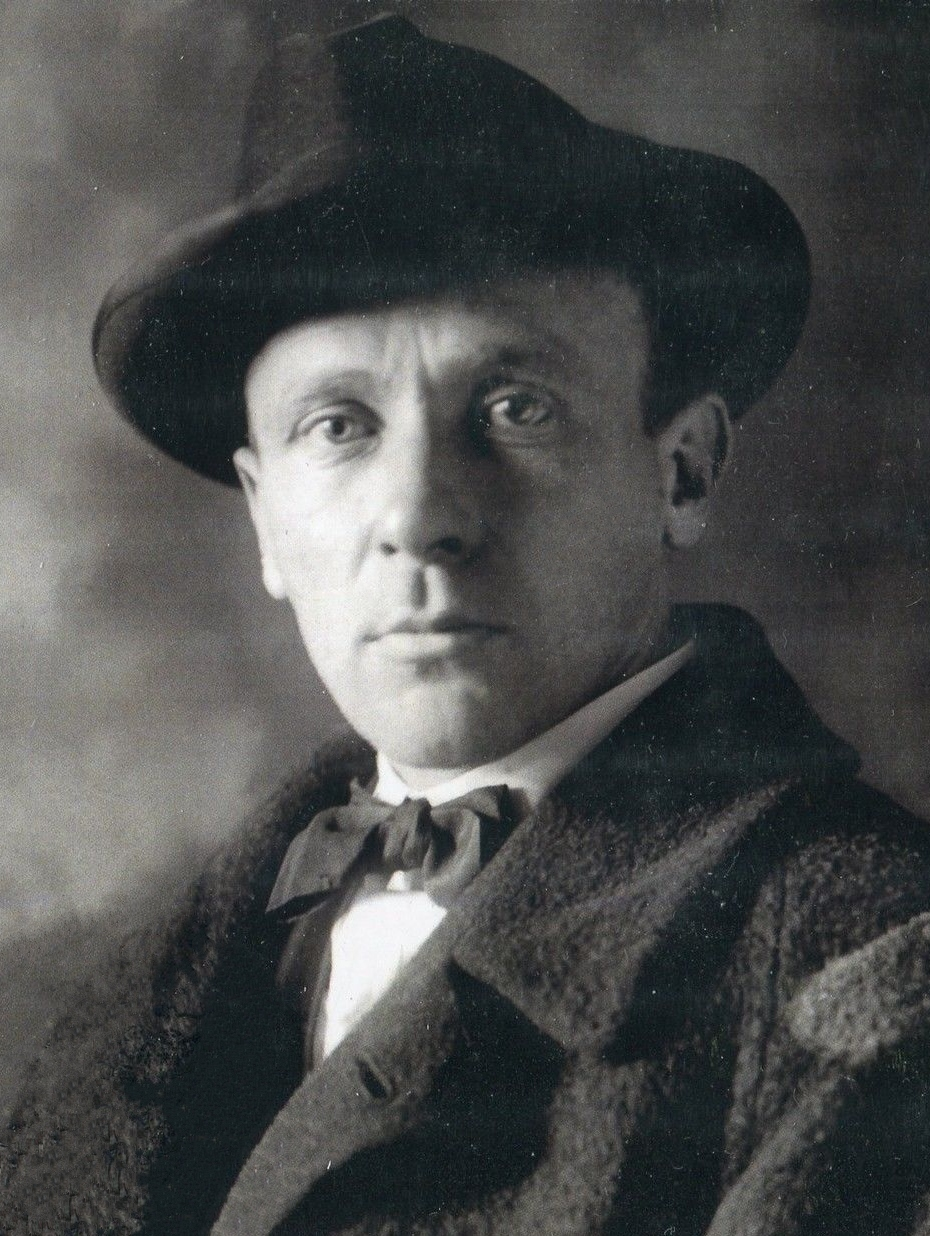
Bulgakov

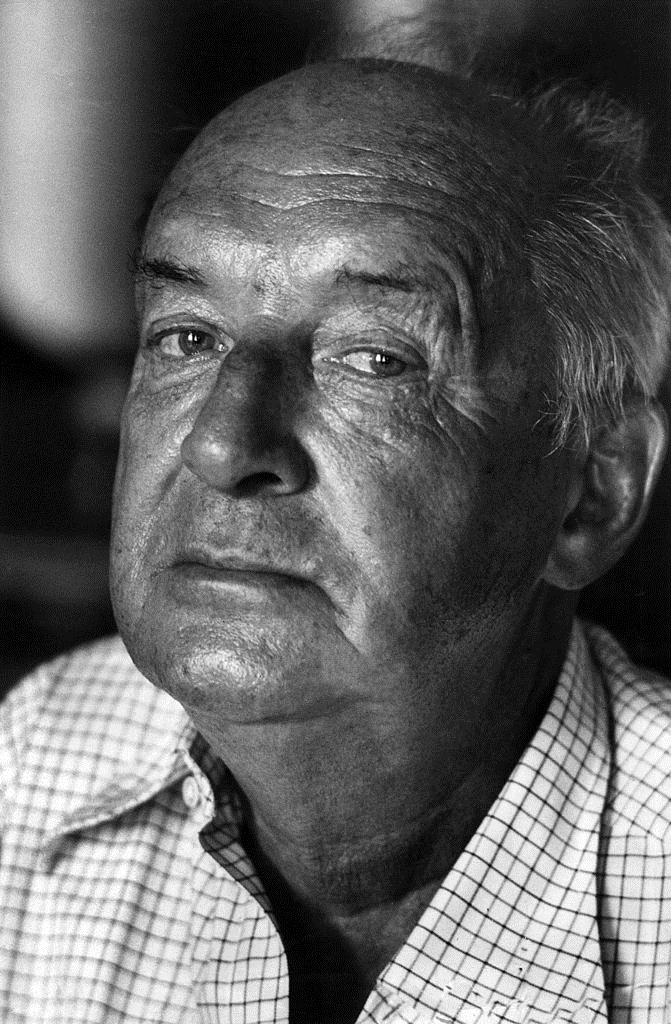
Nabokov

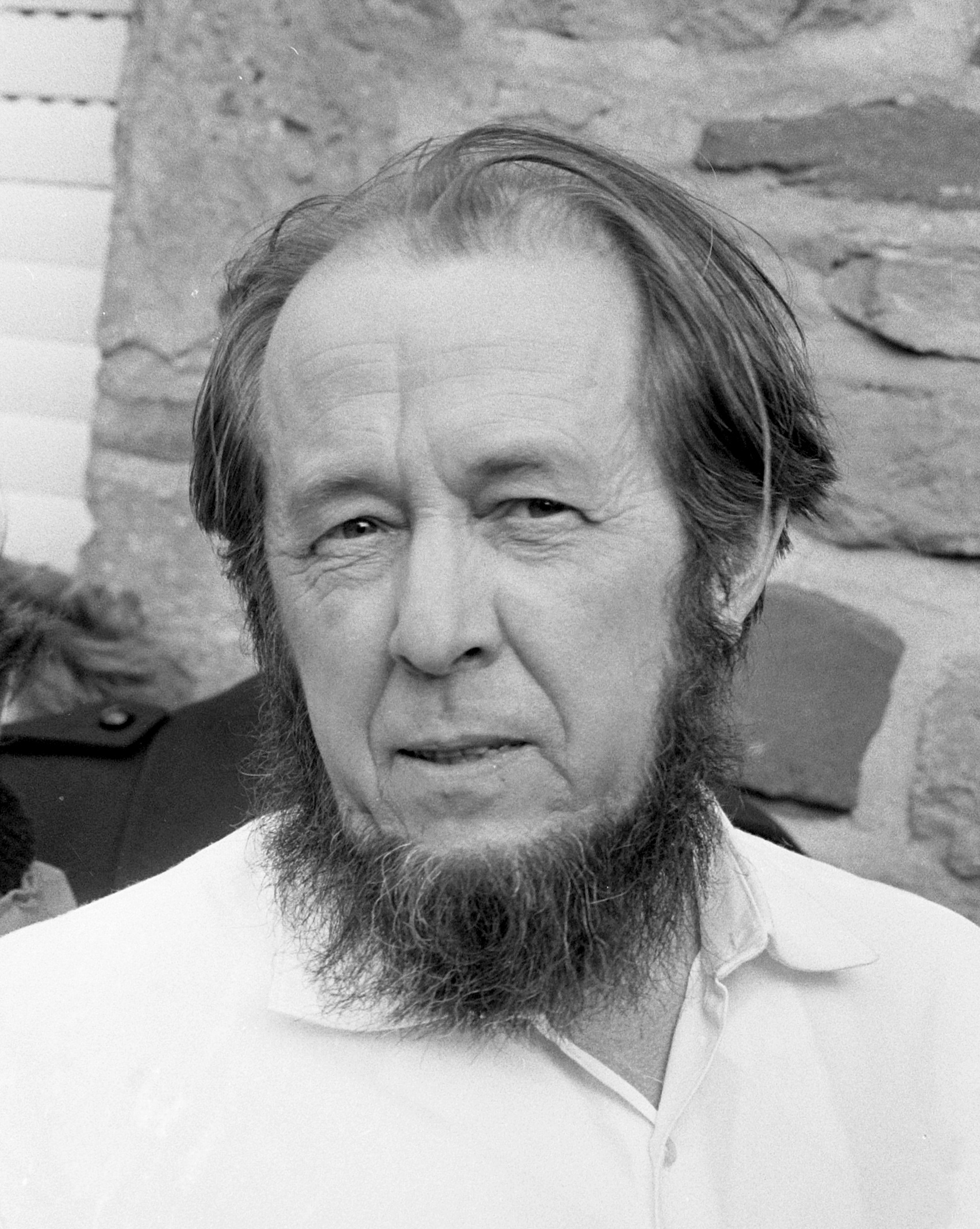
Solzhenitsyn

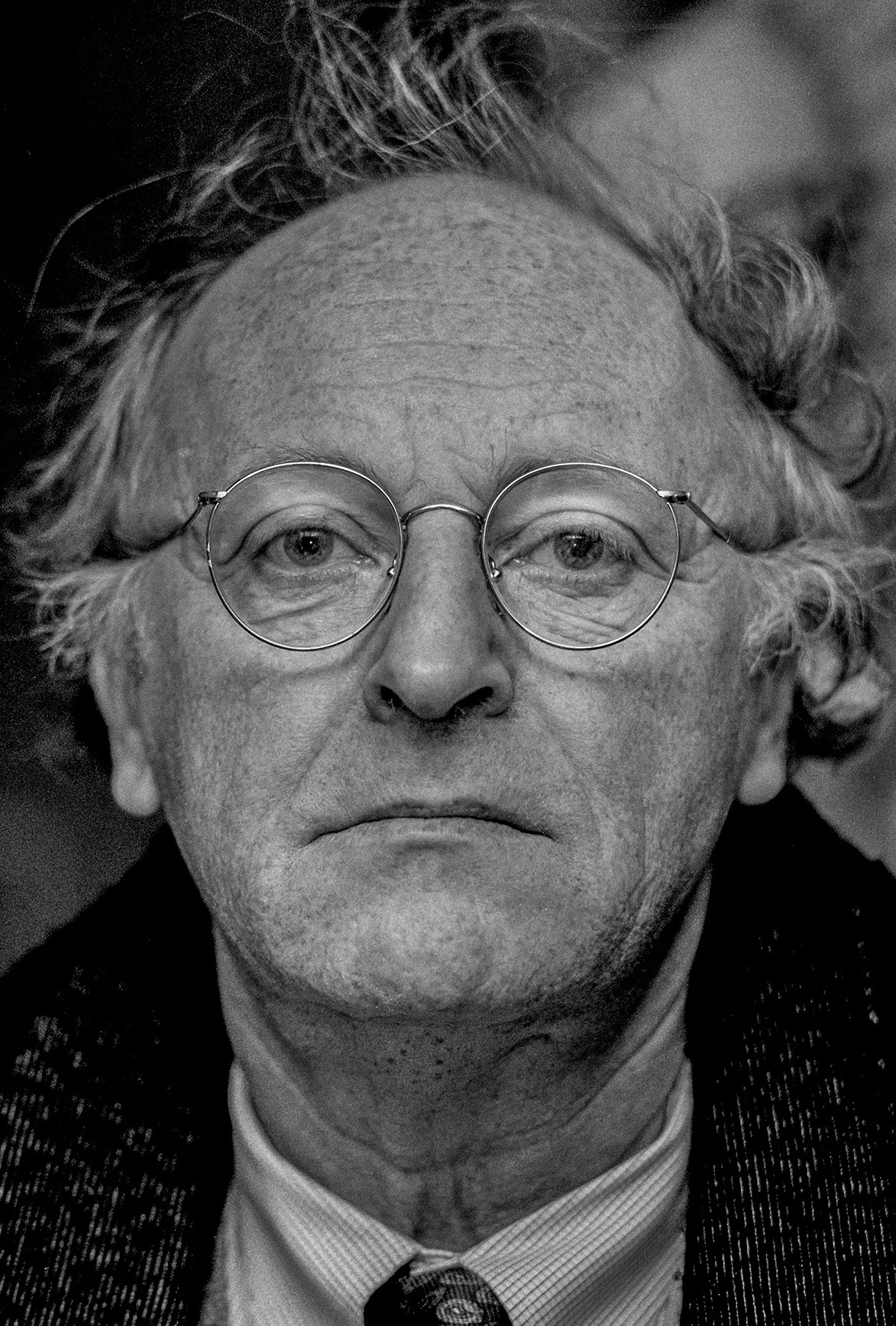
Brodsky

=== Humour ===
Russia owes much of its humour to the flexibility of the Russian language, allowing for puns and unexpected associations. As with any other nation, its vast scope ranges from lewd jokes and silly word play to political satire.

Russian jokes, the most popular form of Russian humour, are short fictional stories or dialogues with a punch line. Russian joke culture features a series of categories with fixed and highly familiar settings and characters. Surprising effects are achieved by an endless variety of plots. Russians love jokes on topics found everywhere in the world, be it politics, spouse relations, or mothers-in-law.

Chastushka, a type of traditional musical Russian poetry, is a single quatrain in trochaic tetrameter with an ABAB or ABCB rhyme scheme. Usually humorous, satirical, or ironic in nature, chastushkas are often put to music as well, usually with balalaika or accordion accompaniment. The rigid, short structure (and to a lesser degree, the type of humor these use) parallels limericks. The name originates from the Russian word части́ть, meaning "to speak fast".

== Visual arts ==
As early as the 12th and 13th centuries Russia had its national masters who were free of all foreign influence, i. e. that of the Greeks on the one hand, and on the other hand that of the Lombard master-masons called in Andrei Georgievich to build the Uspensky (Assumption) Cathedral in the city of Vladimir. Russia's relations with the Greek world were hampered by the Mongol invasion, and it is to the isolation arising from this that we must attribute the originality of Slavo-Russian ornamentation, which has a character of its own, quite unlike the Byzantine style and the Romanesque.

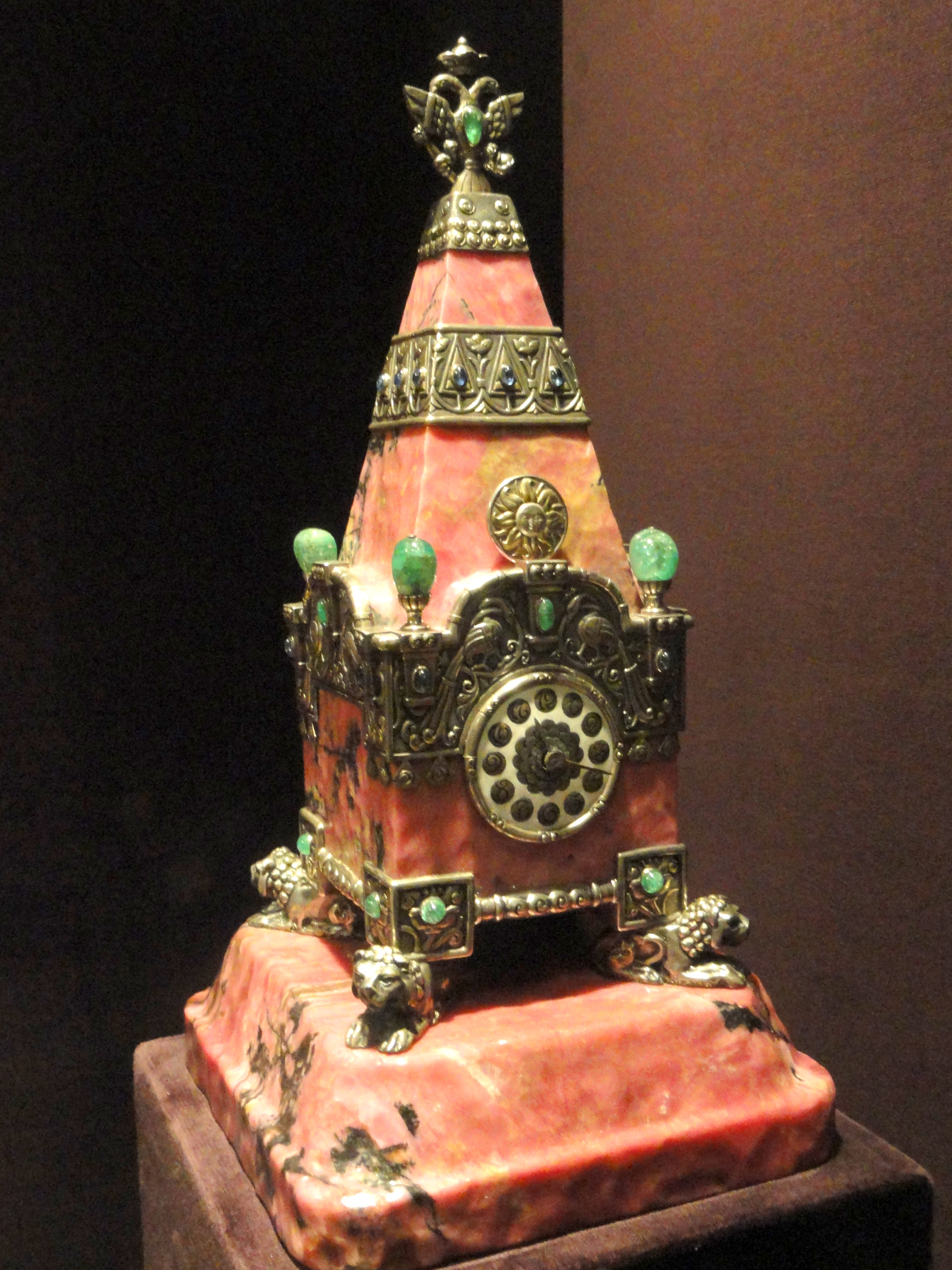
Kremlin Tower Clock; 1913; rhodonite, silver, enamel, emeralds, sapphires; by House of Fabergé; Cleveland Museum of Art

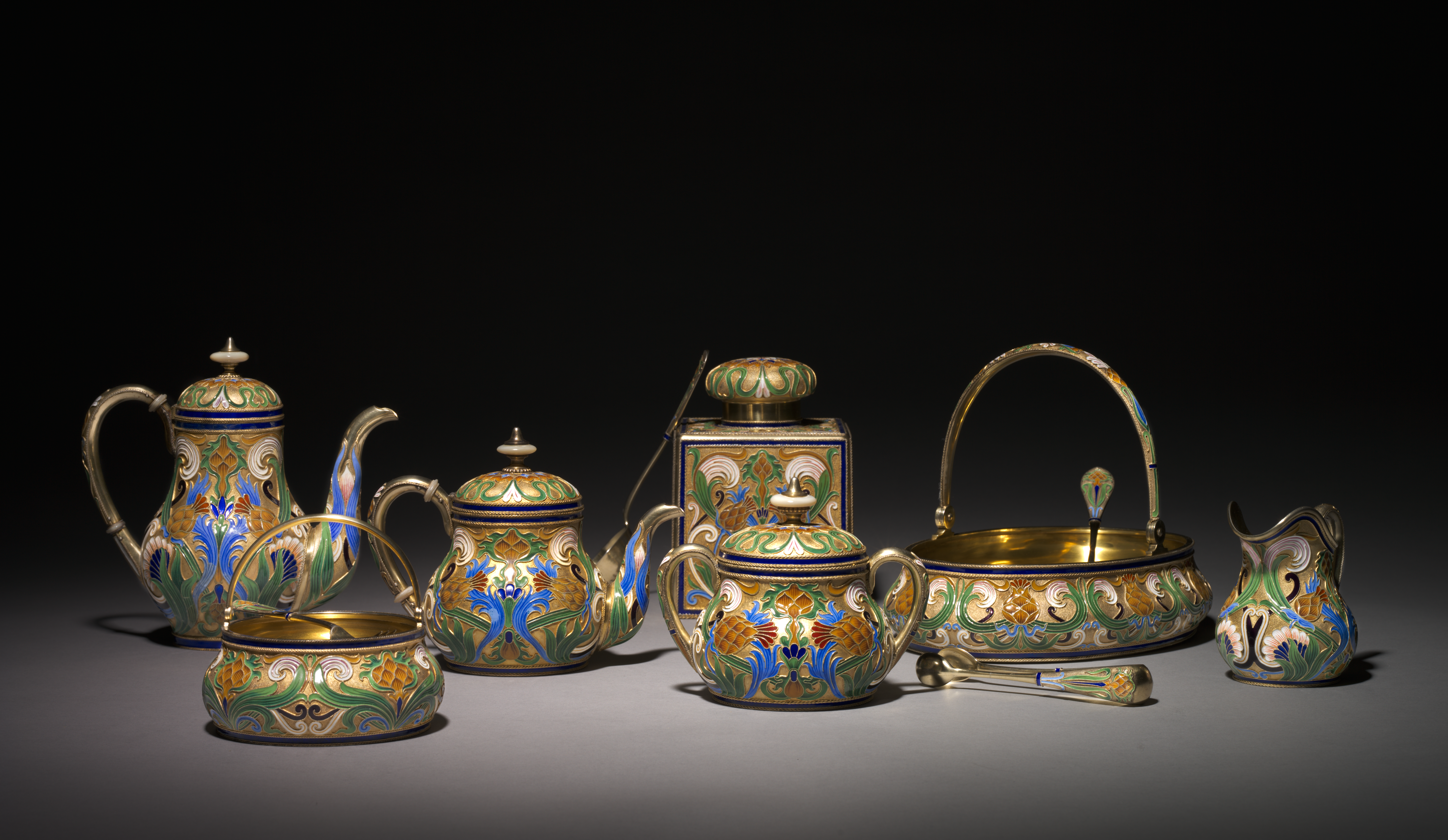
Russian tea set; by Peter Carl Fabergé; made before 1896; silver gilt and opaque cloisonne enamel; Cleveland Museum of Art (USA)

Kovsh (wine vessel); by Fedor I. Rückert; 1896–1906; overall: 8.3 x 20.4 x 12.7 cm; Cleveland Museum of Art

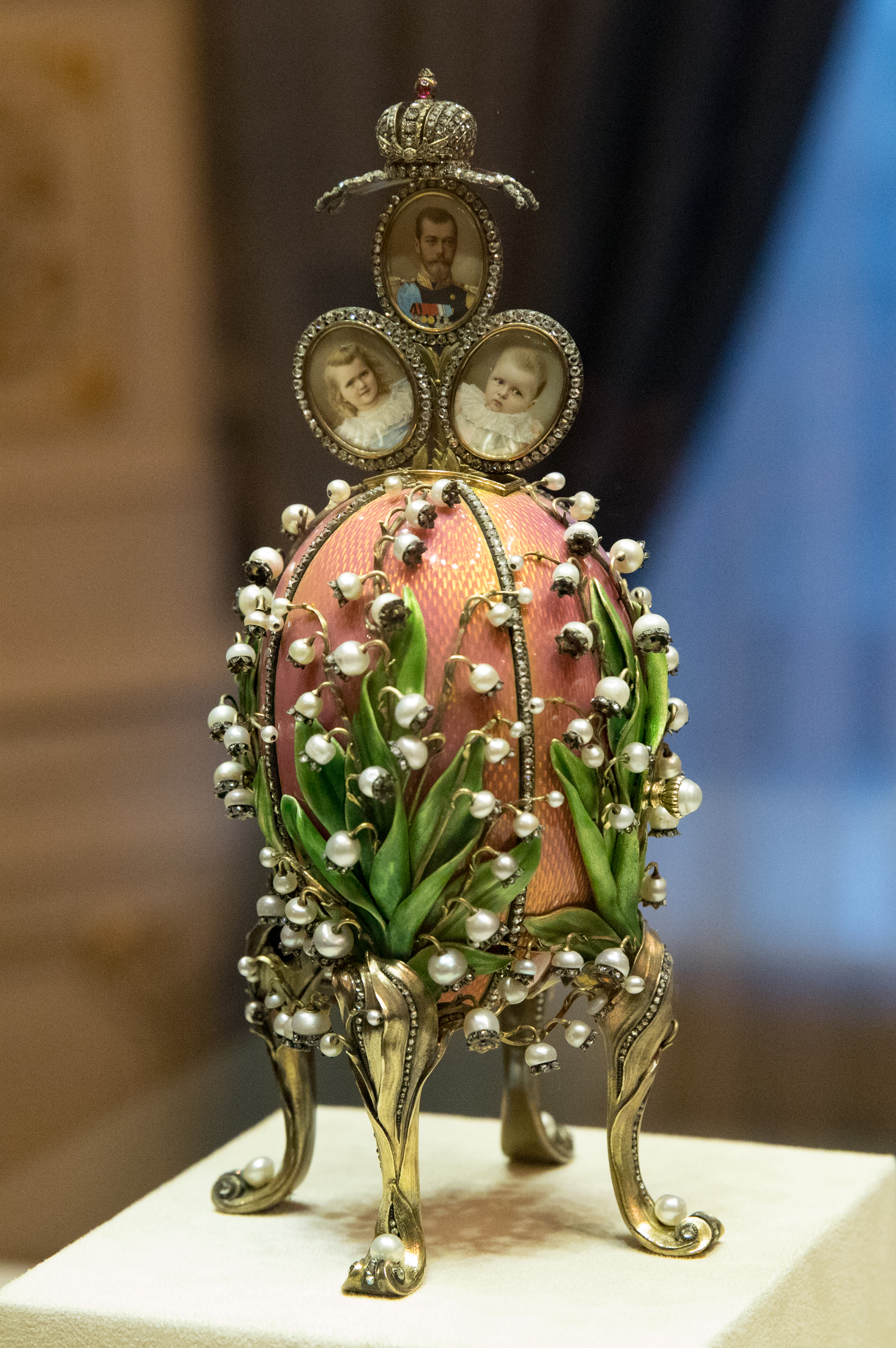
Lilies of the Valley, a Fabergé egg; by Peter Carl Fabergé; 1898; enamel, gold, diamonds, rubies & pearls; 15.1 cm (5.9 in) when is closed; Fabergé Museum (Saint Petersburg, Russia)

=== Architecture ===
The history of Russian architecture begins with early woodcraft buildings of ancient Slavs, and the church architecture of Kievan Rus'. Following the Christianization of Kievan Rus', for several centuries it was influenced predominantly by the Byzantine Empire. Aristotle Fioravanti and other Italian architects brought Renaissance trends into Russia. The 16th century saw the development of the unique tent-like churches; and the onion dome design, which is a distinctive feature of Russian architecture. In the 17th century, the "fiery style" of ornamentation flourished in Moscow and Yaroslavl, gradually paving the way for the Naryshkin baroque of the 1690s.

After the reforms of Peter the Great, Russia's architecture became influenced by Western European styles. The 18th-century taste for Rococo architecture led to the splendid works of Bartolomeo Rastrelli and his followers. The most influential Russian architects of the eighteenth century; Vasily Bazhenov, Matvey Kazakov, and Ivan Starov, created lasting monuments in Moscow and Saint Petersburg and established a base for the more Russian forms that followed. During the reign of Catherine the Great, Saint Petersburg was transformed into an outdoor museum of Neoclassical architecture. During Alexander I's rule, Empire style became the de facto architectural style, and Nicholas I opened the gate of Eclecticism to Russia. The second half of the 19th century was dominated by the Neo-Byzantine and Russian Revival style. In the early 20th century, Russian neoclassical revival became a trend. Prevalent styles of the late 20th century were the Art Nouveau, Constructivism, and Socialist Classicism.

Some notable Russian buildings include:

- Saint Sophia Cathedral in Novgorod | Golden Gate (Vladimir) | Cathedral of Christ the Saviour | Assumption Cathedral in Vladimir | Cathedral of the Annunciation | Cathedral of the Archangel | Cathedral of the Dormition | Church of the Savior on Blood | Saint Basil's Cathedral | Kazan Kremlin | Saint Isaac's Cathedral | Kazan Cathedral | Peter and Paul Cathedral | Sukharev Tower | Menshikov Tower | Moscow Manege | Narva Triumphal Gate | Kolomenskoye | Peterhof Palace | Gatchina | Troitse-Sergiyeva Lavra | Solovetsky Monastery | Kunstkamera | Russian Museum | Catherine Palace | Grand Kremlin Palace | Winter Palace | Simonov Monastery | Novodevichy Convent | Lenin's Mausoleum | Tatlin's Tower | Palace of the Soviets | Seven Sisters (Moscow) | All-Soviet Exhibition Centre | Ostankino Tower | Triumph-Palace | White House of Russia
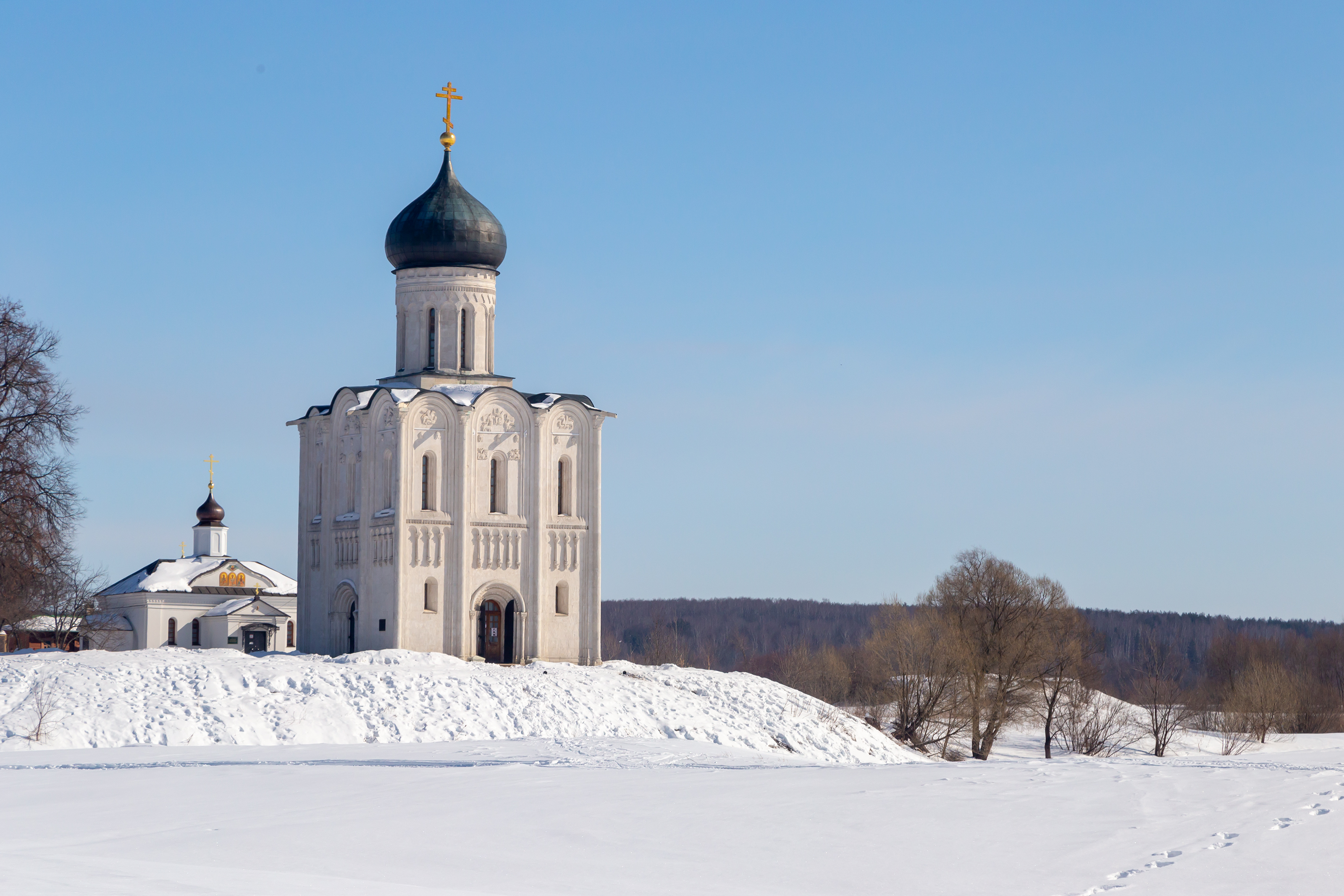
Church of the Intercession on the Nerl in Bogolyubovo

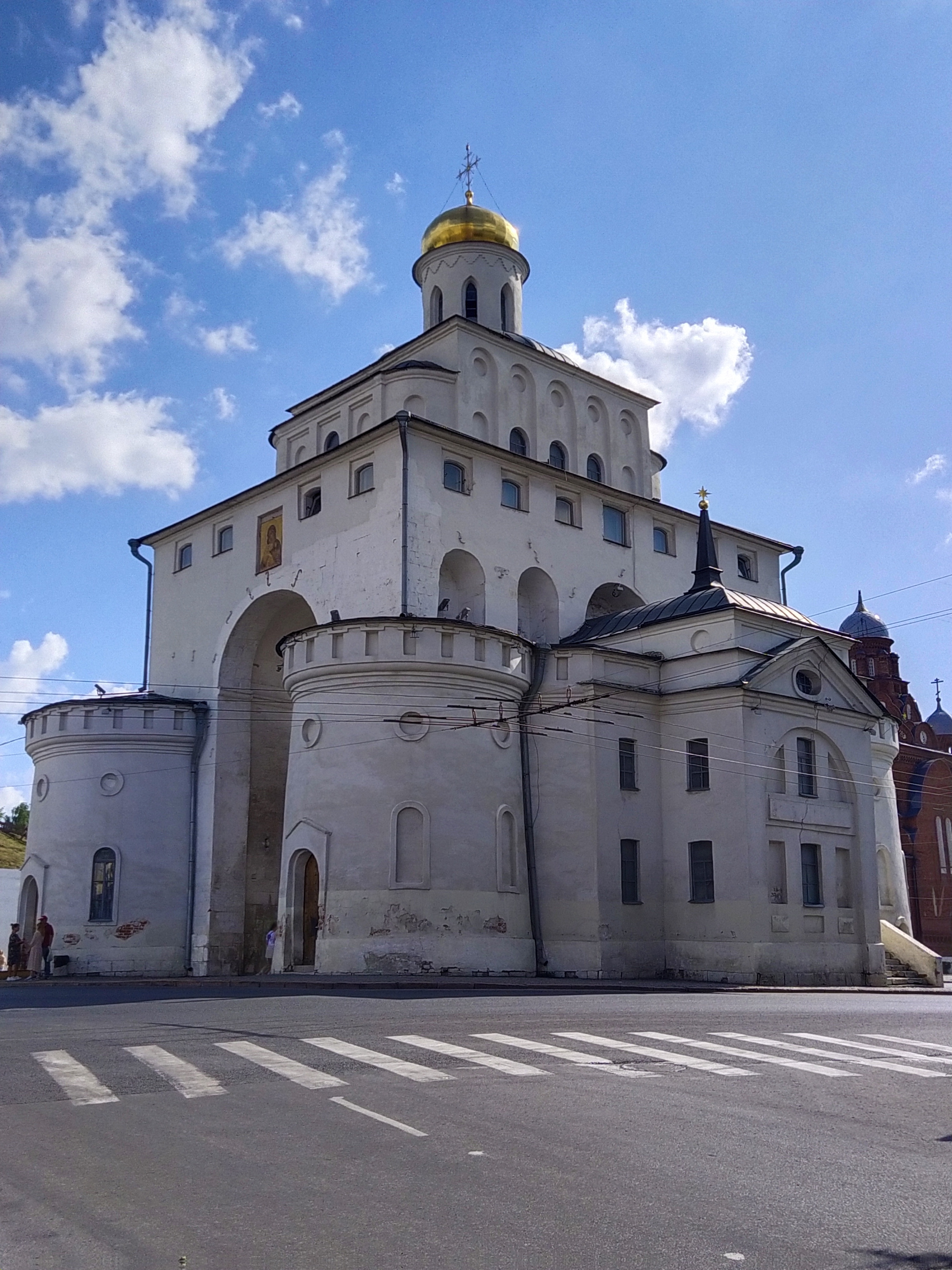
Golden Gate, Vladimir

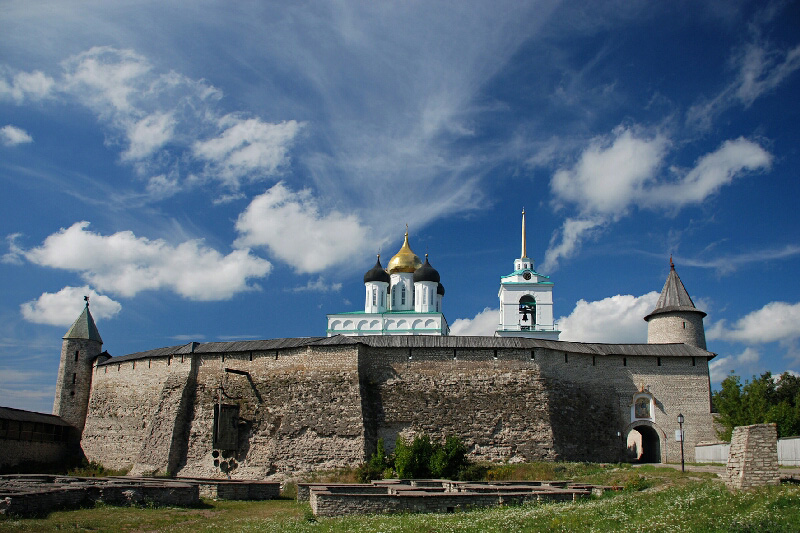
The medieval Pskov Krom

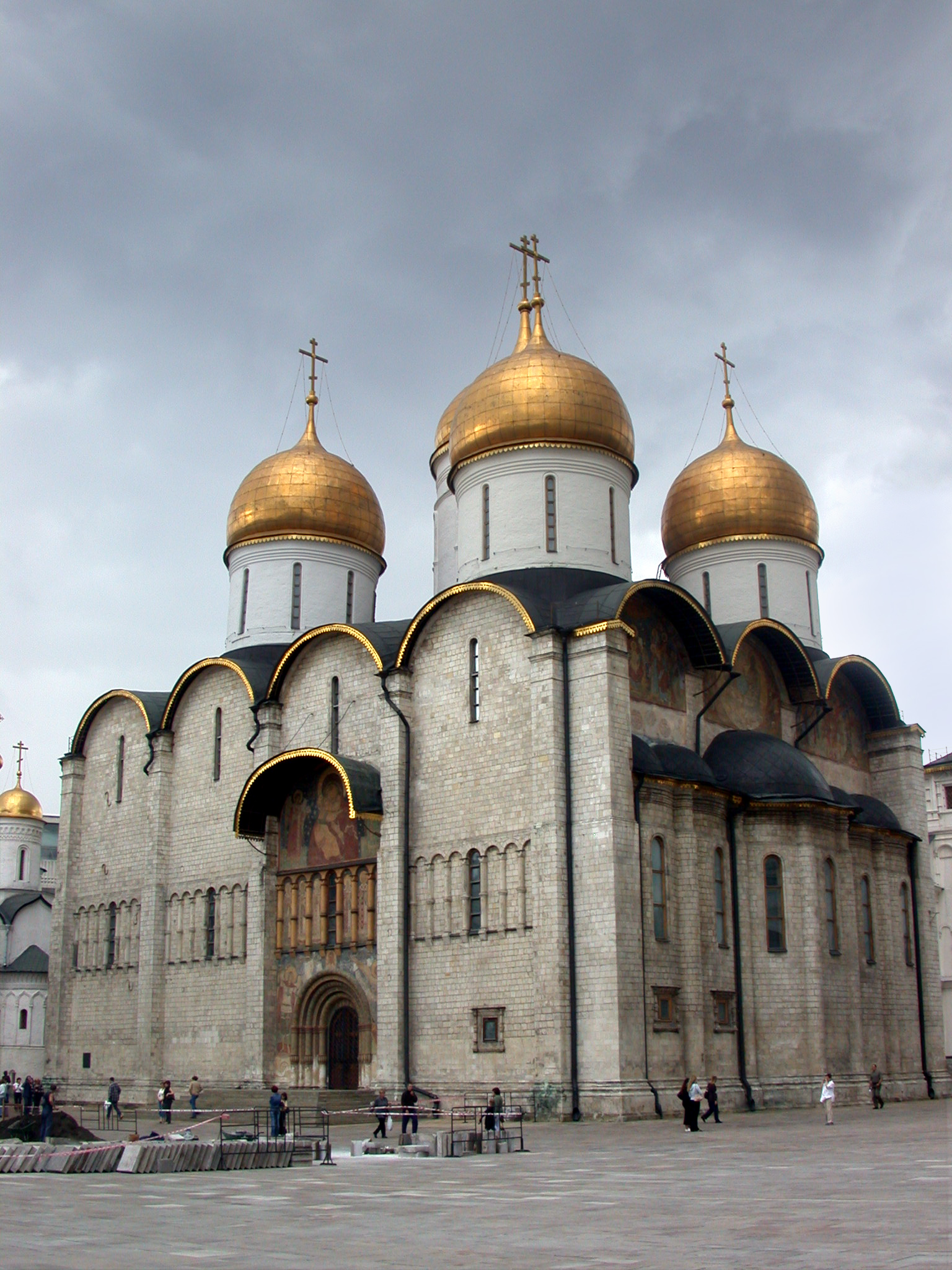
Dormition Cathedral in Moscow

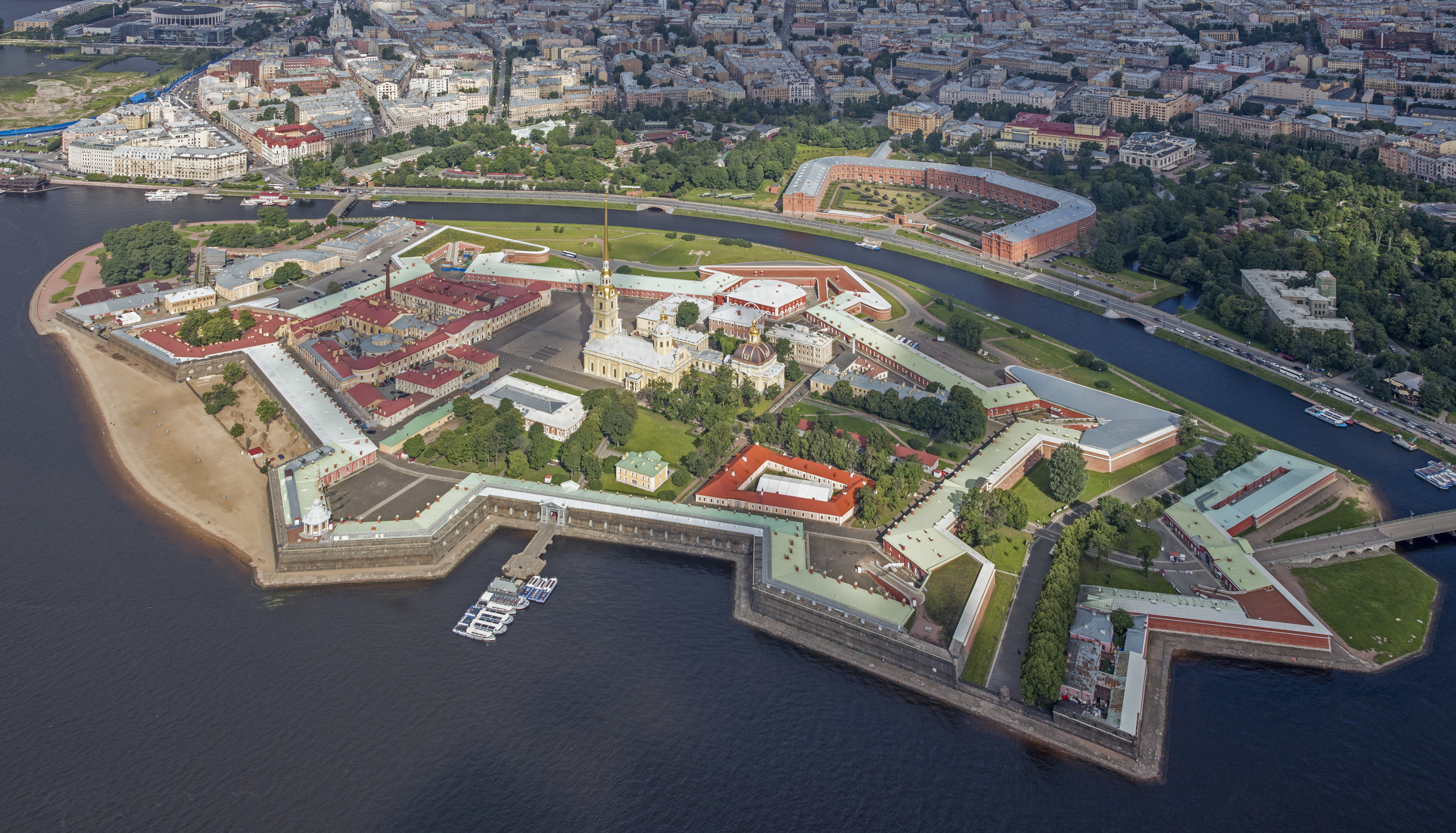
Peter and Paul Fortress in Saint Petersburg

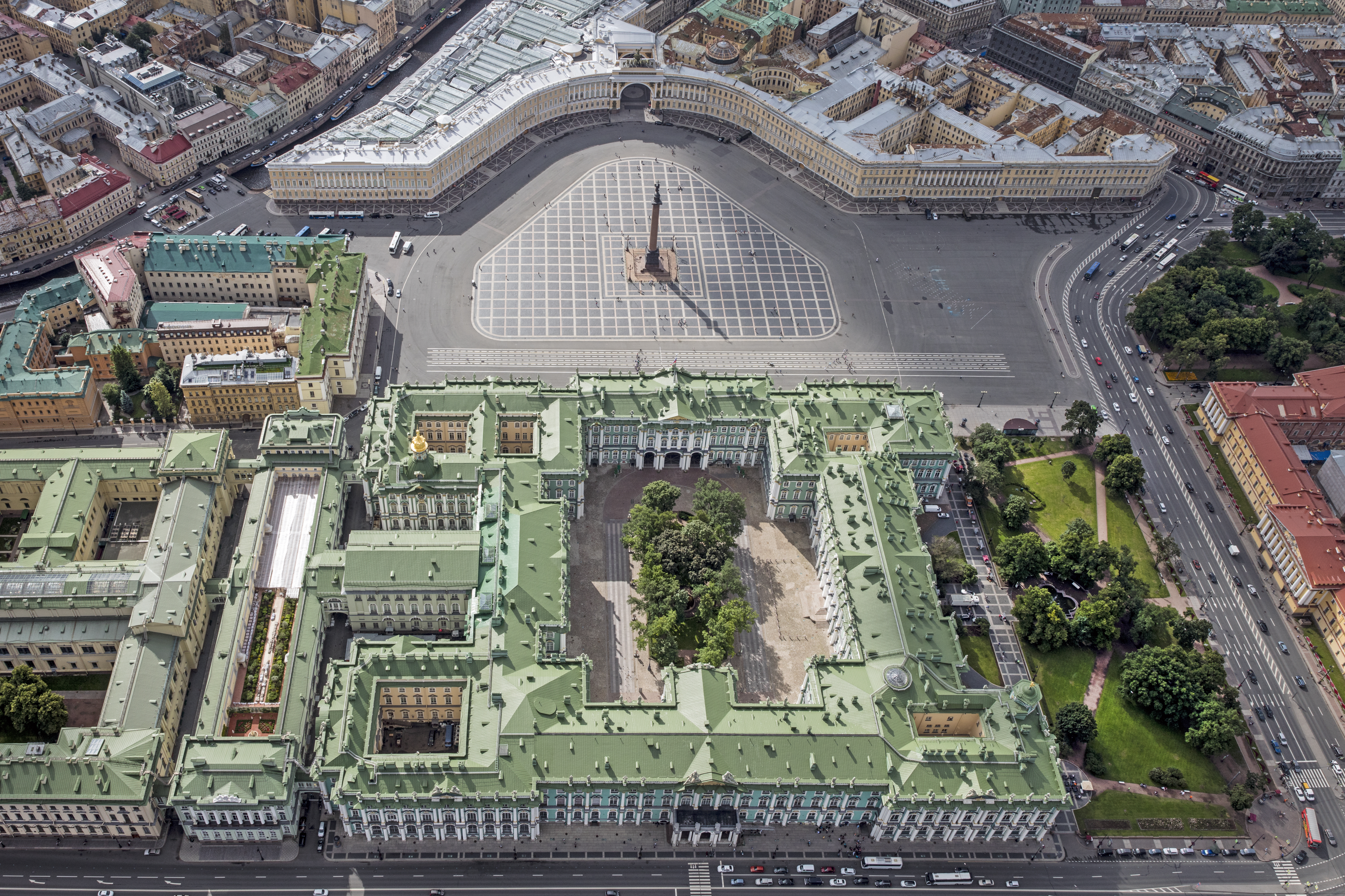
An aerial view of the Winter Palace, Alexander Column and the General Staff Building at the Palace Square, Saint Petersburg

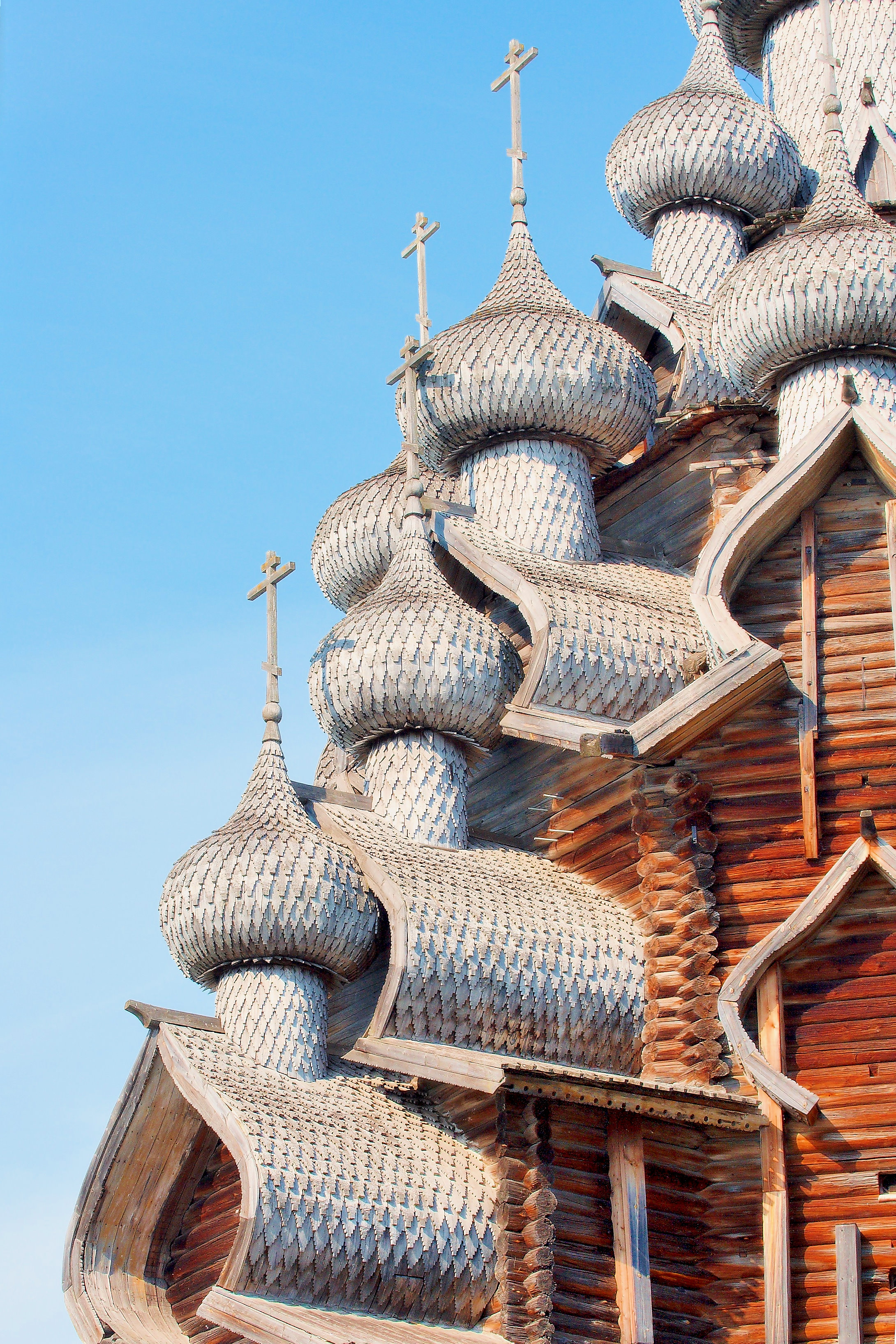
Details of the domes, Kizhi

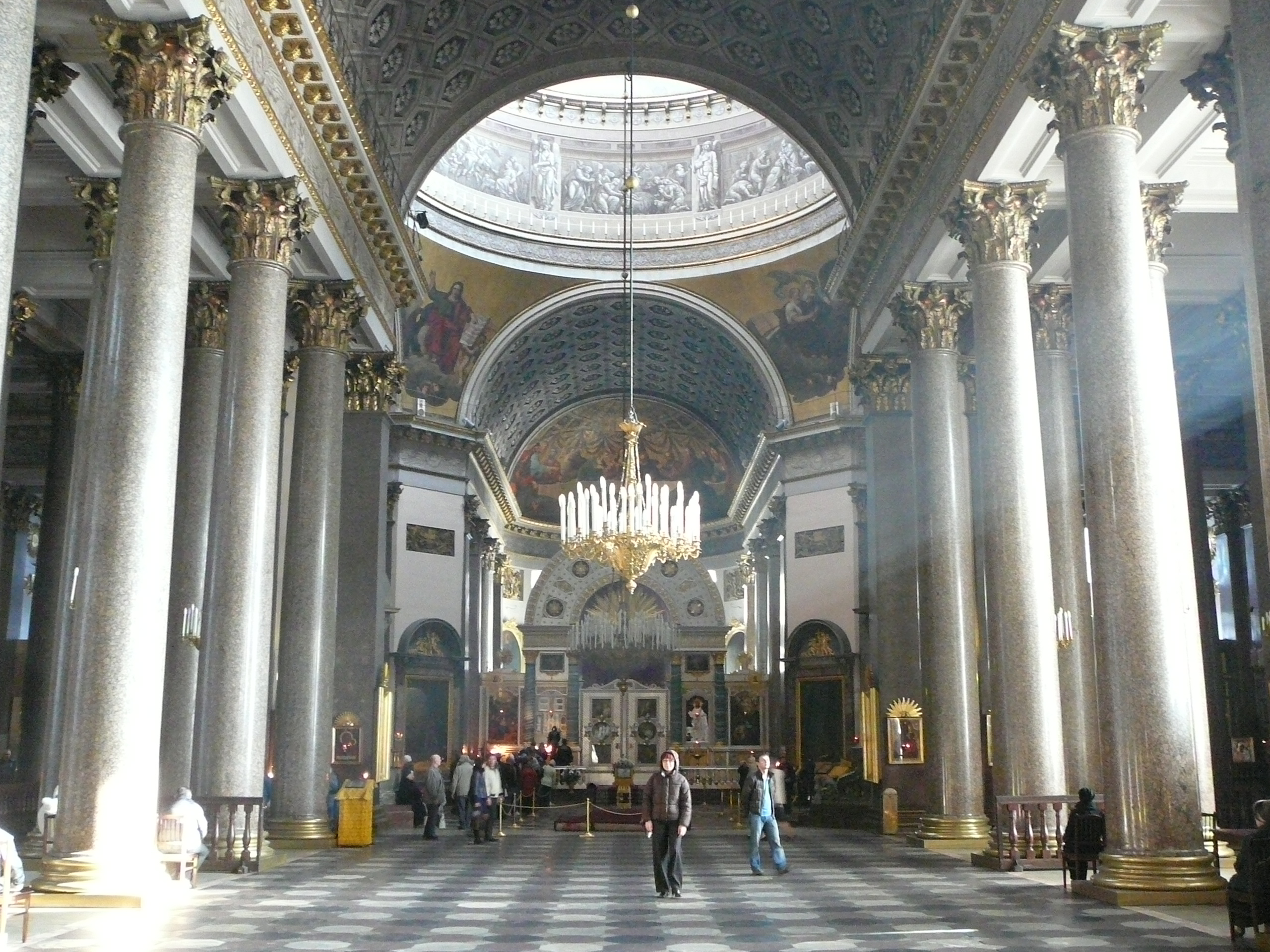
An interior of Kazan Cathedral, Saint Petersburg

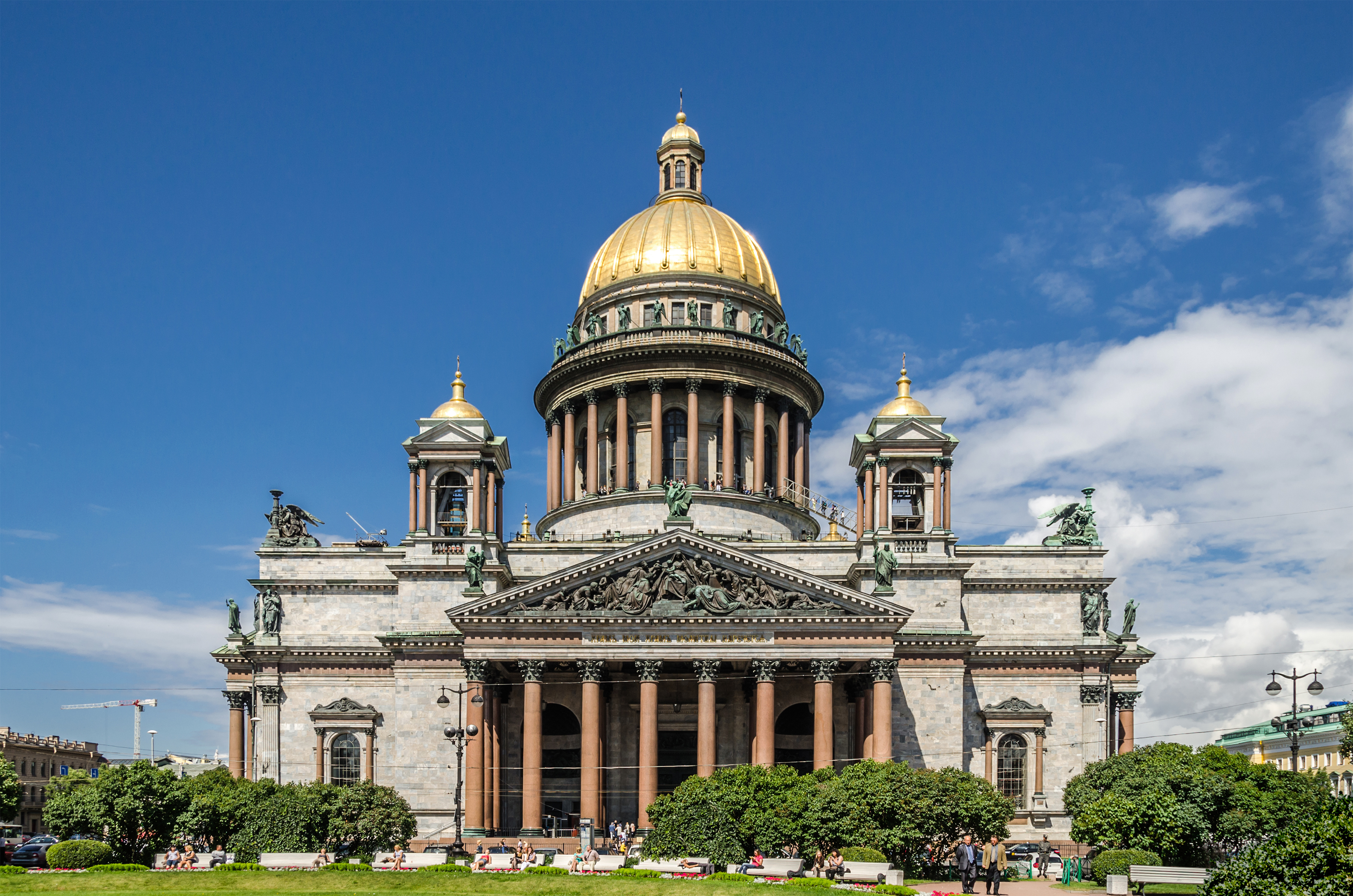
Saint Isaac's Cathedral from Saint Petersburg

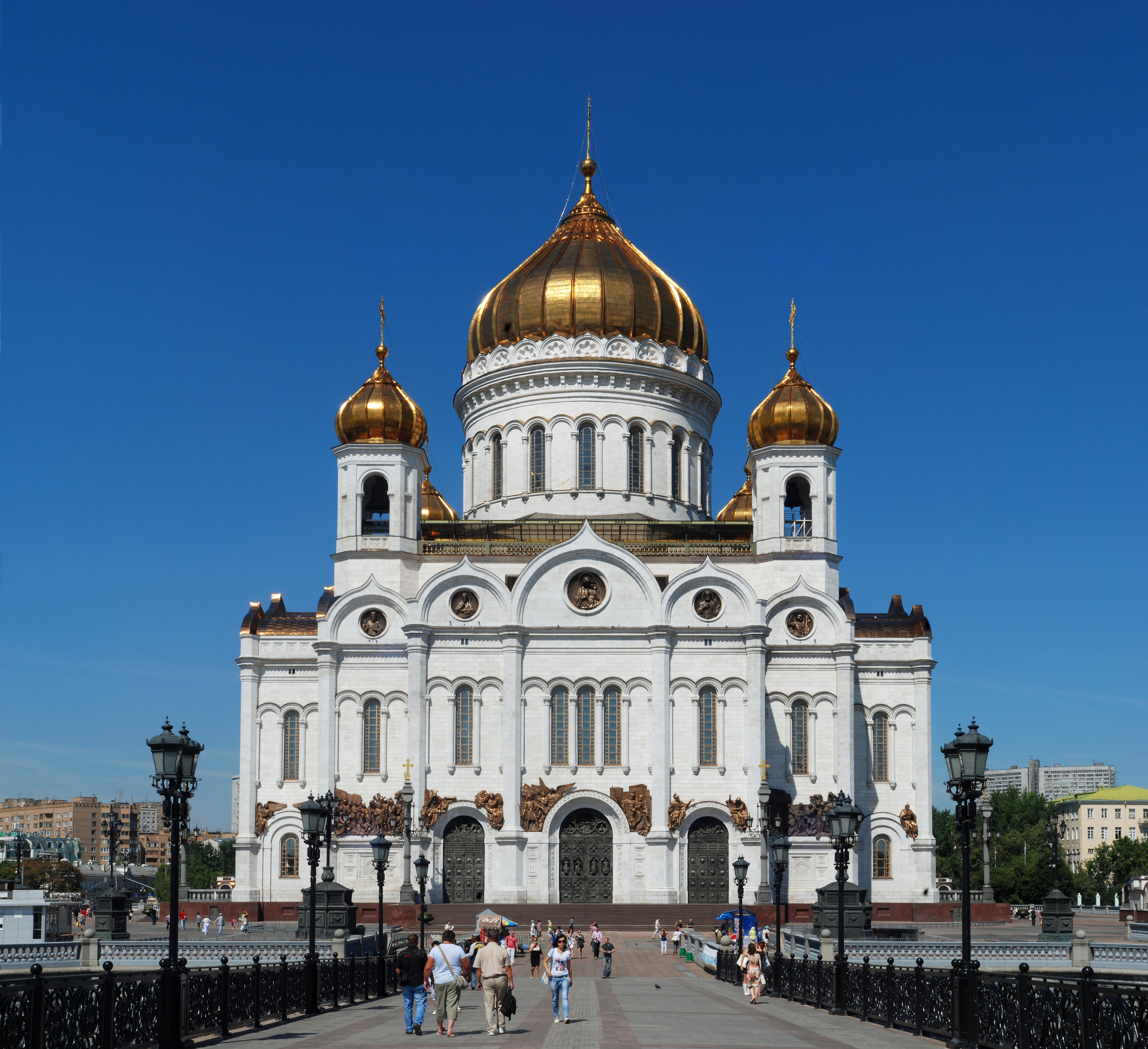
Cathedral of Christ the Saviour in Moscow

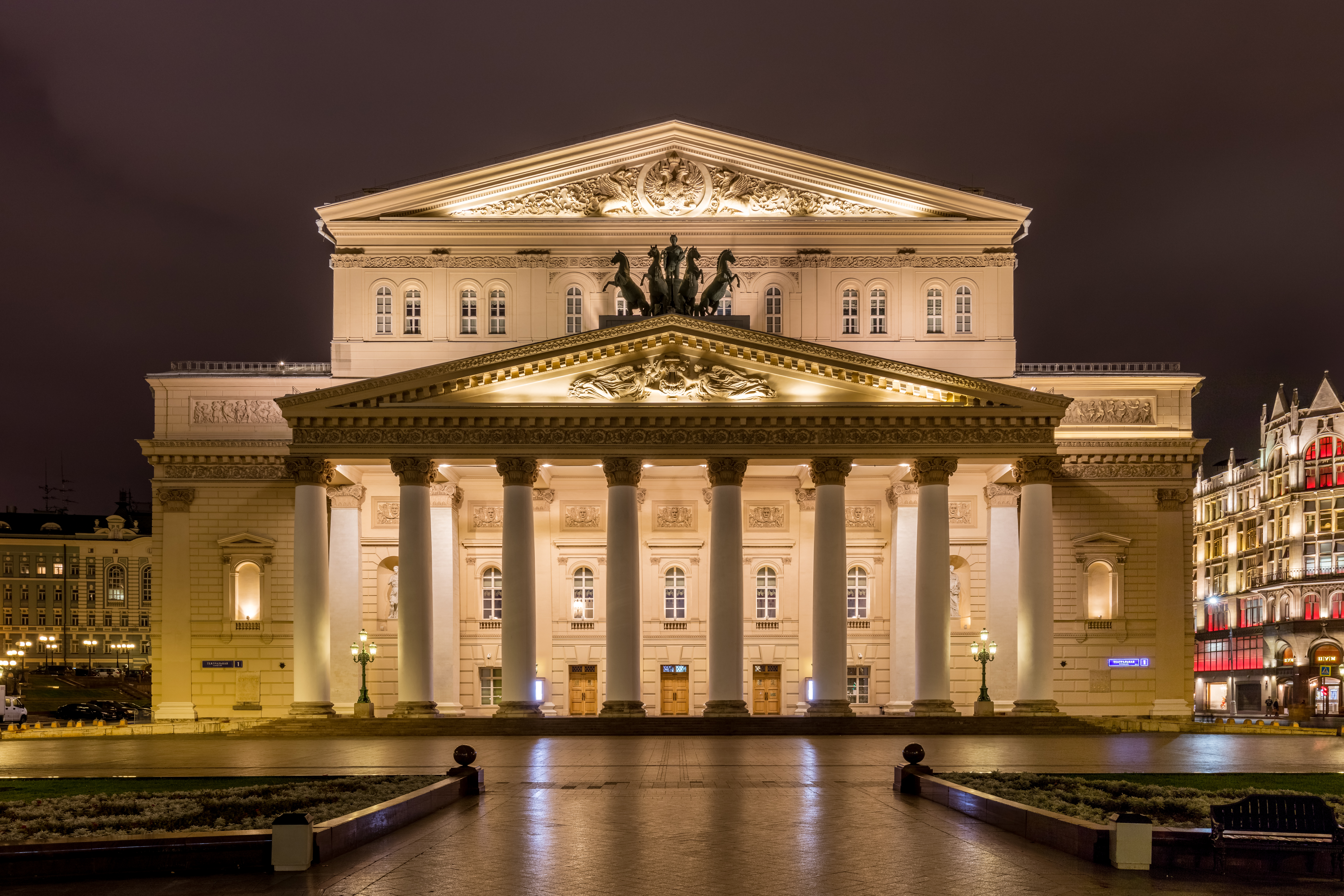
The Bolshoi Theatre in Moscow

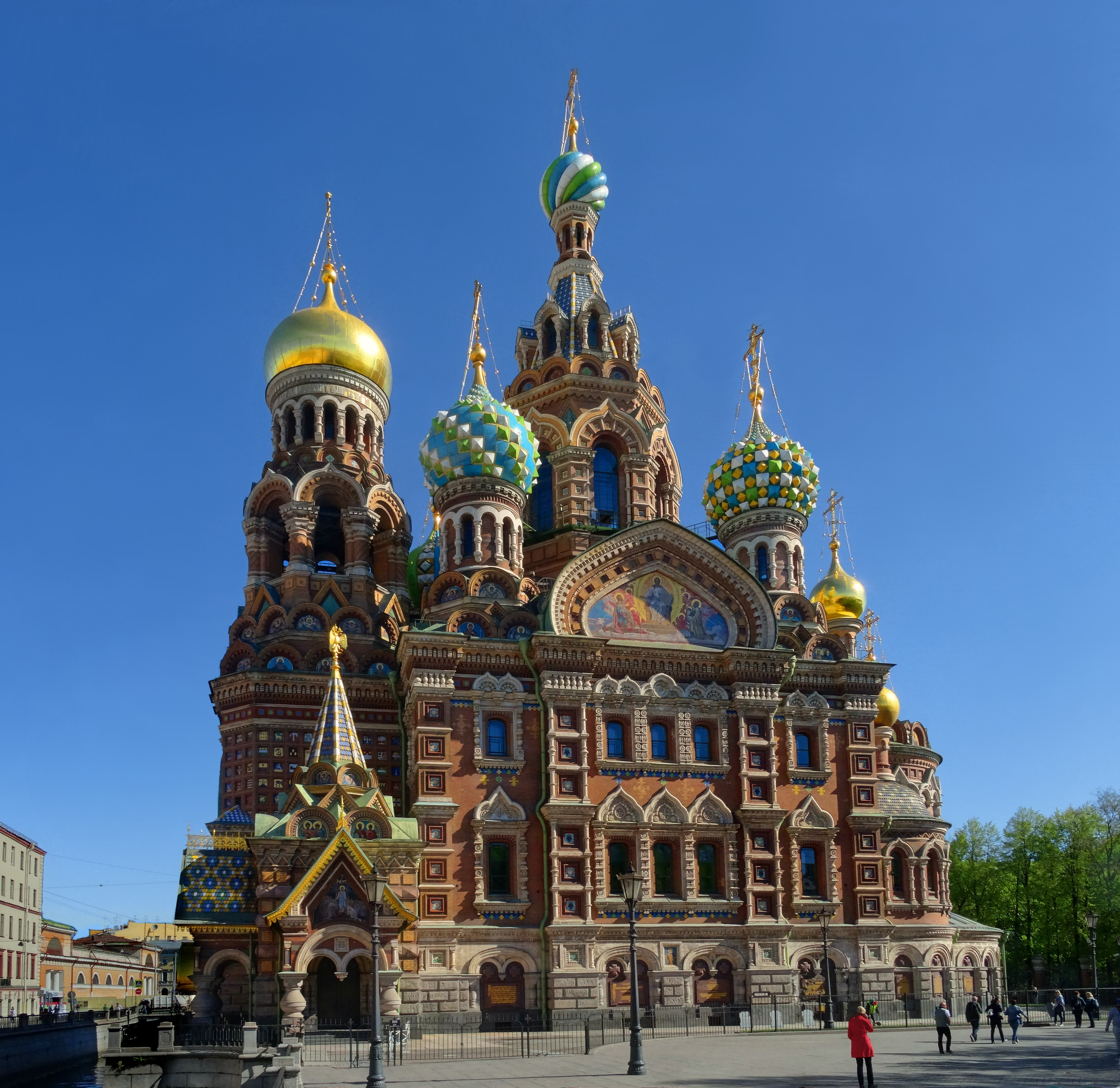
Church of the Savior on Blood in Saint Petersburg

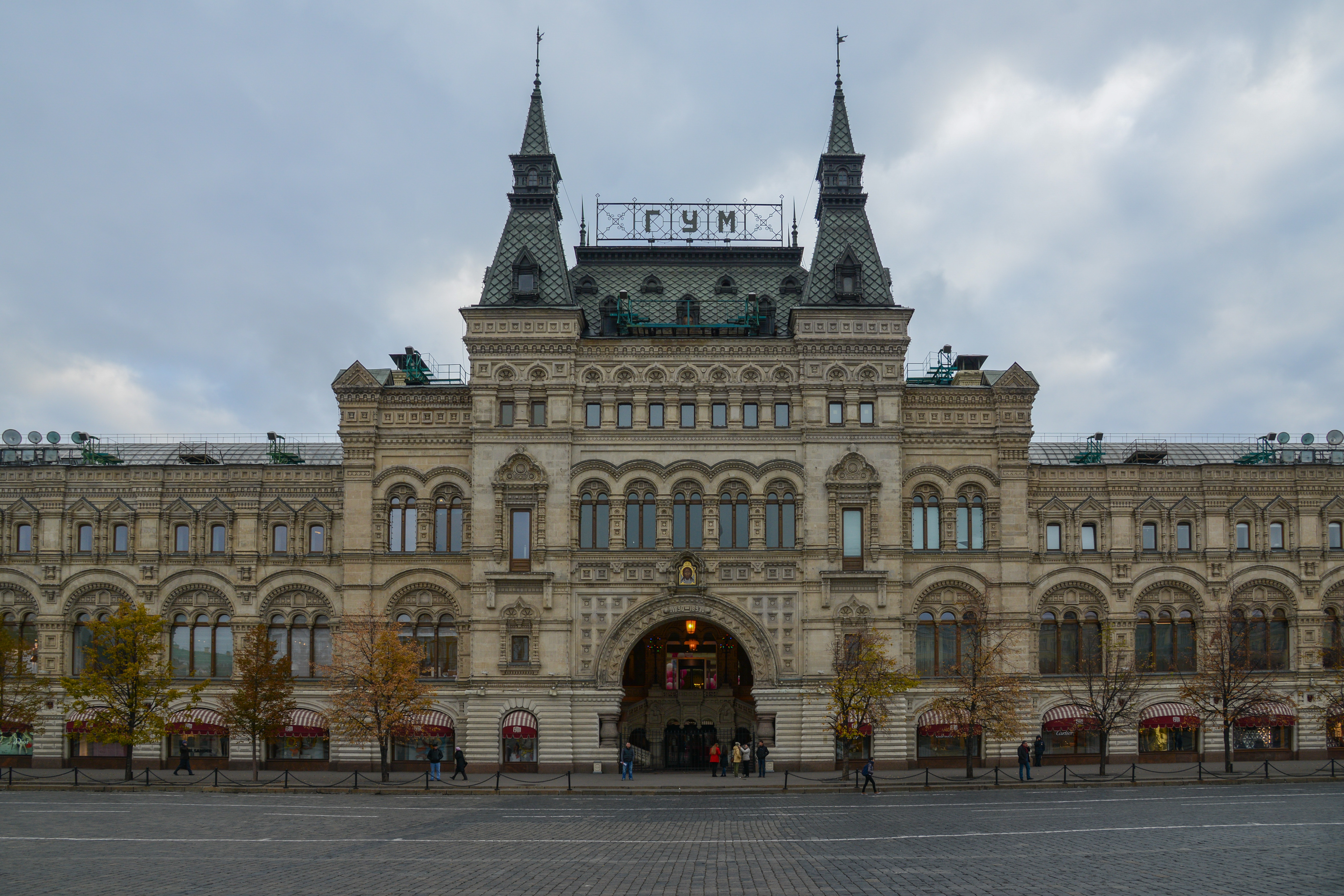
GUM in Moscow

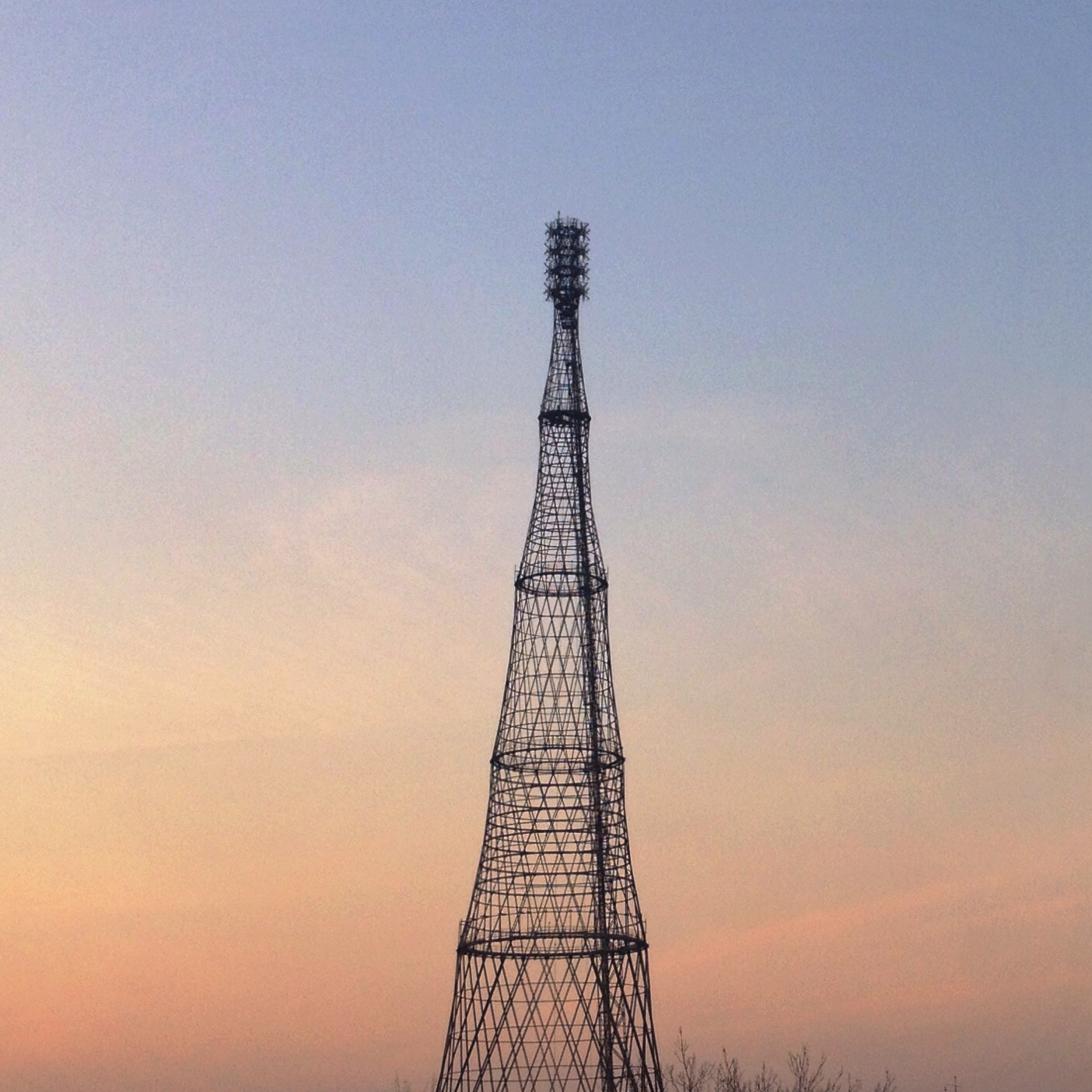
The Shukhov Tower in Moscow

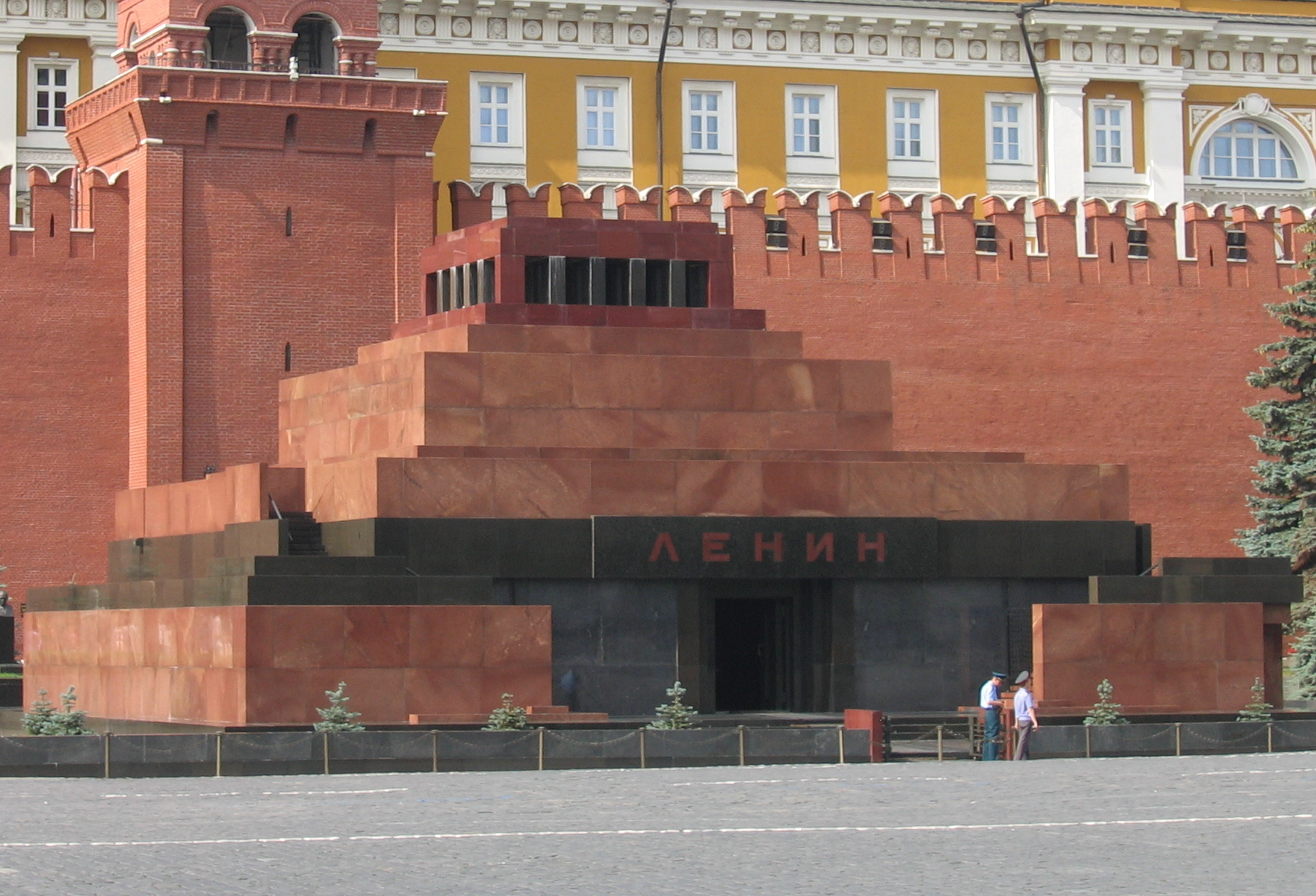
Lenin's Mausoleum in Moscow

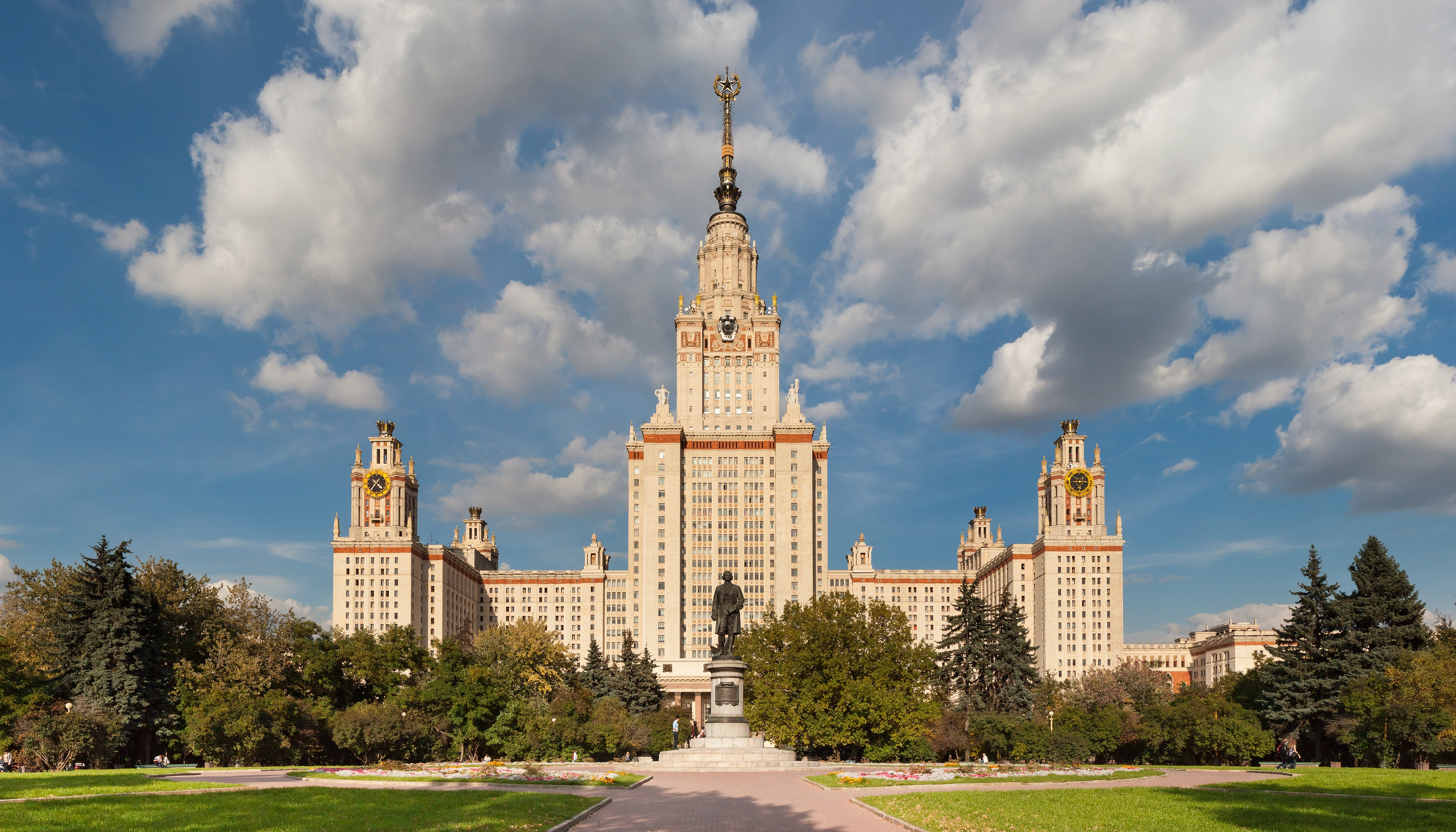
The main building of Moscow State University in Moscow

=== Handicraft ===
Matryoshka doll is a Russian nesting doll. A set of Matryoshka dolls consist of a wooden figure which can be pulled apart to reveal another figure of the same sort but somewhat smaller inside. It has in turn another somewhat smaller figure inside, and so on. The number of nested figures is usually six or more. The shape is mostly cylindrical, rounded at the top for the head and tapered towards the bottom, but little else. The dolls have no extremities, (except those that are painted). The true artistry is in the painting of each doll, which can be extremely elaborate. The theme is usually peasant girls in traditional dress, but can be almost anything; for instance, fairy tales or Soviet leaders.

Other forms of Russian handicraft include khokhloma, Dymkovo toy, gzhel, Zhostovo painting, Filimonov toys, pisanka, Pavlovo Posad shawl, Rushnyk, and palekh.

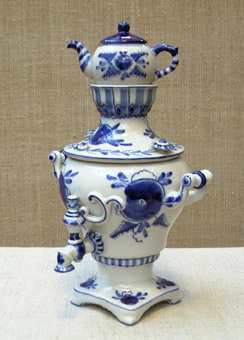
A Gzhel samovar

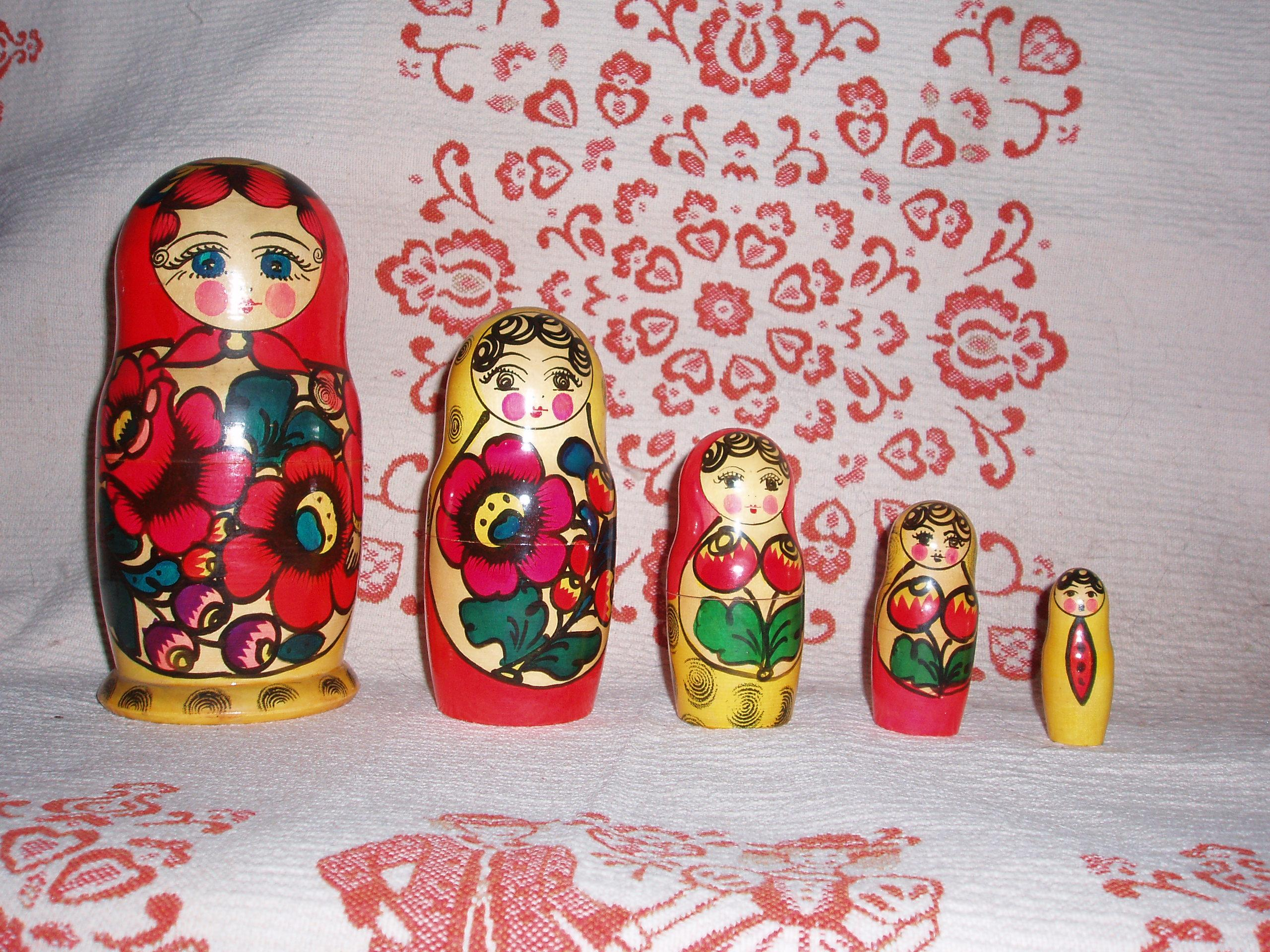
Matryoshka doll

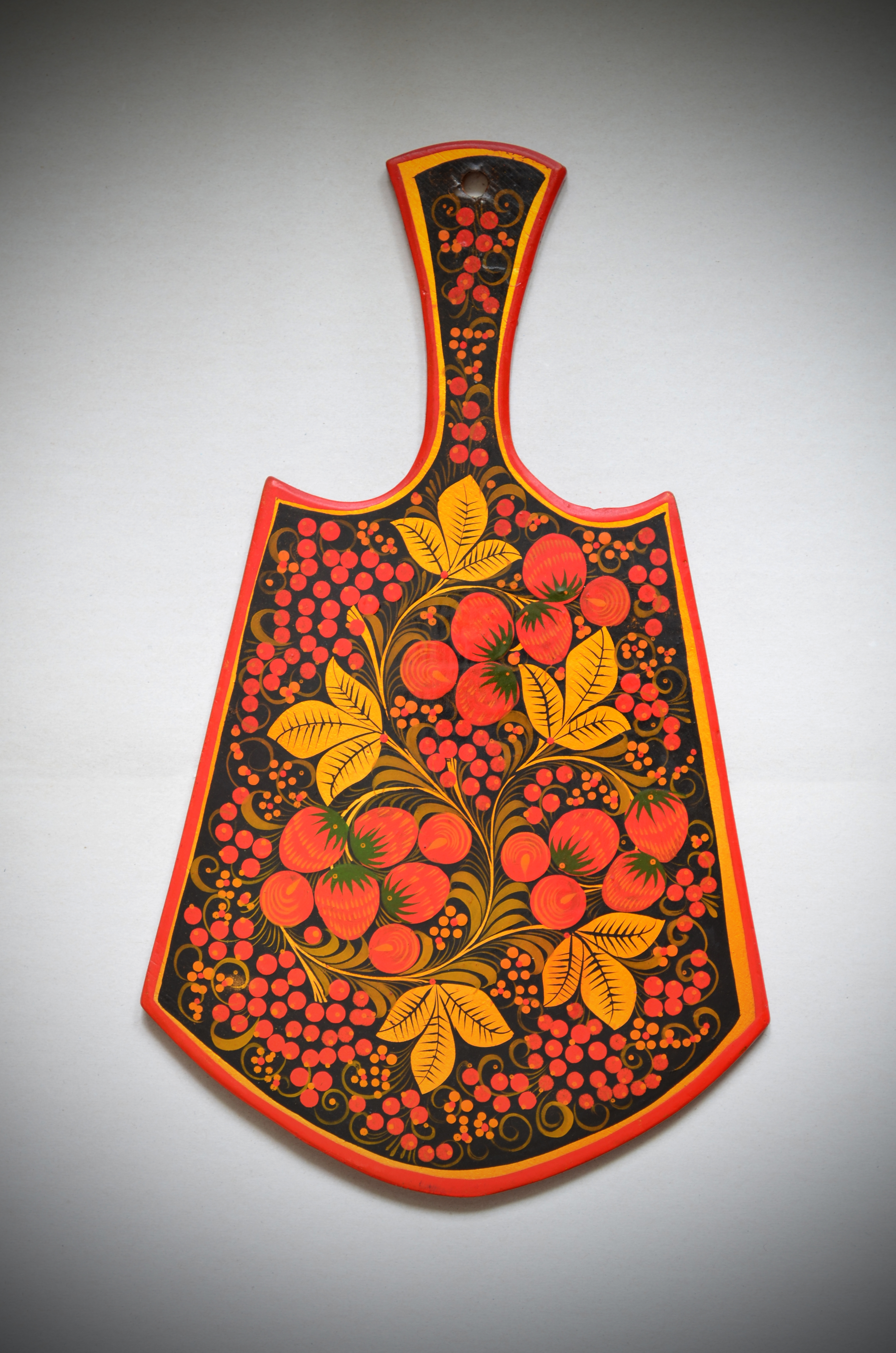
A Khokhloma painting on a cutting board

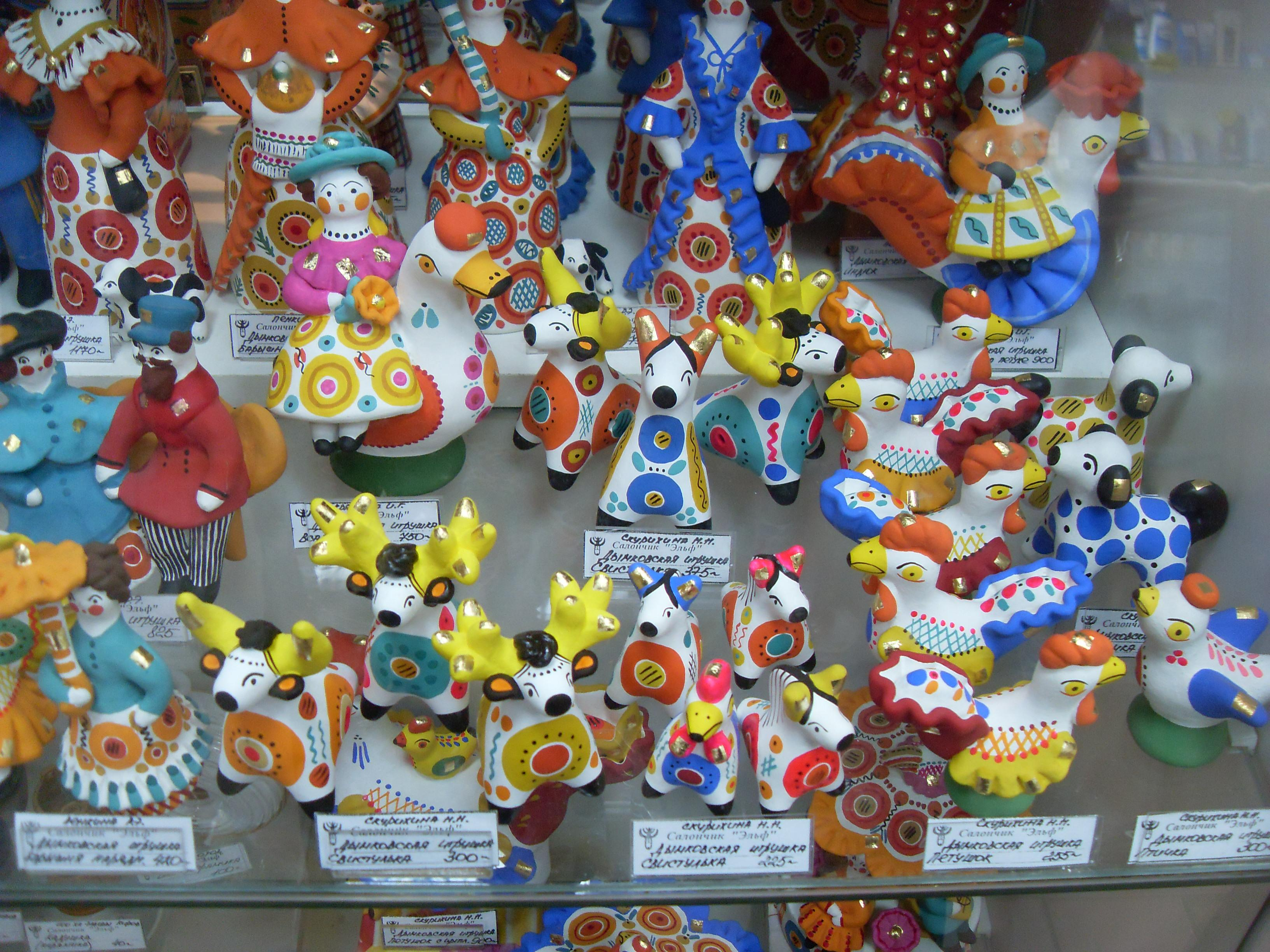
Dymkovo toys in a store

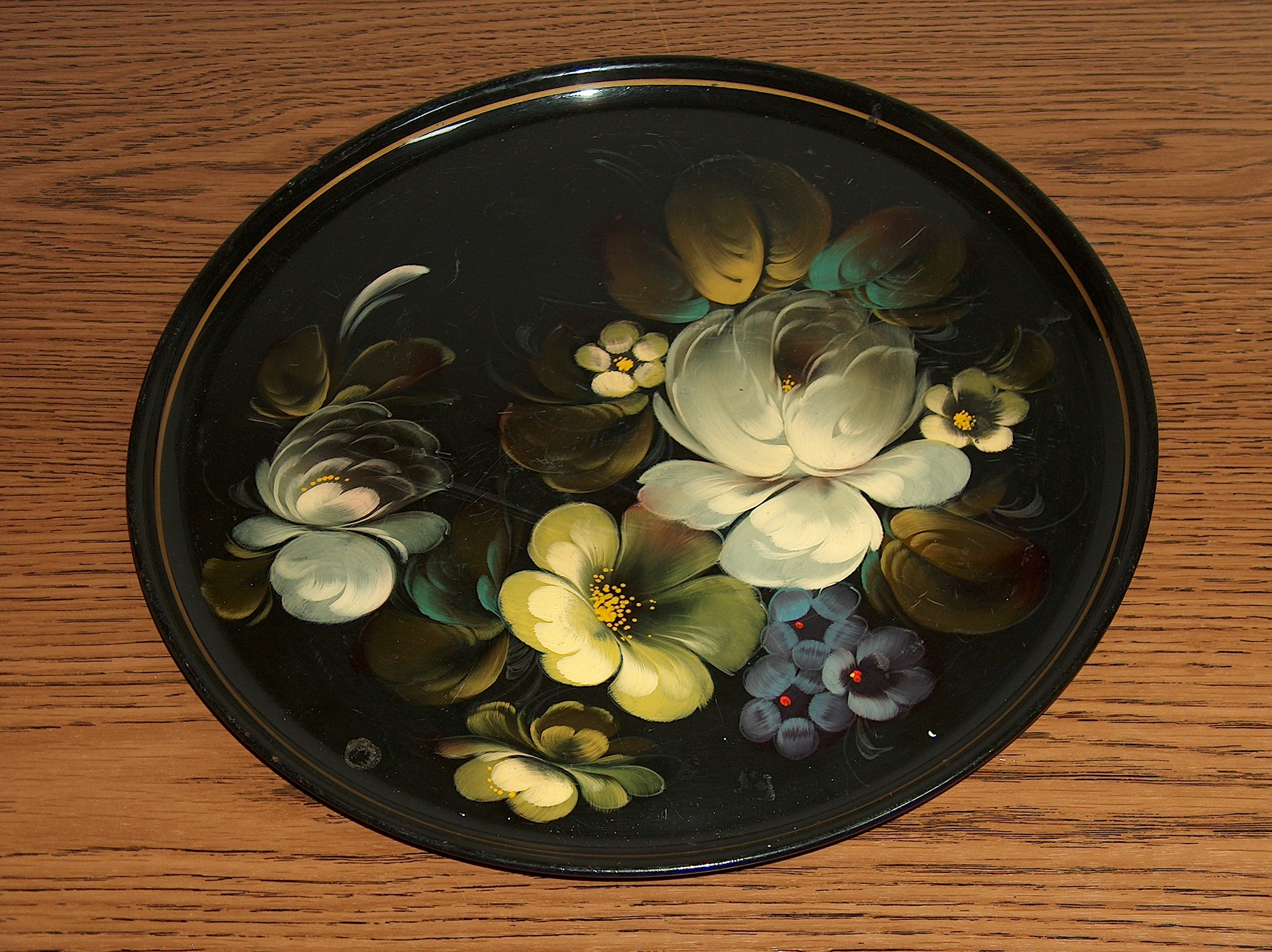
A Zhostovo painting

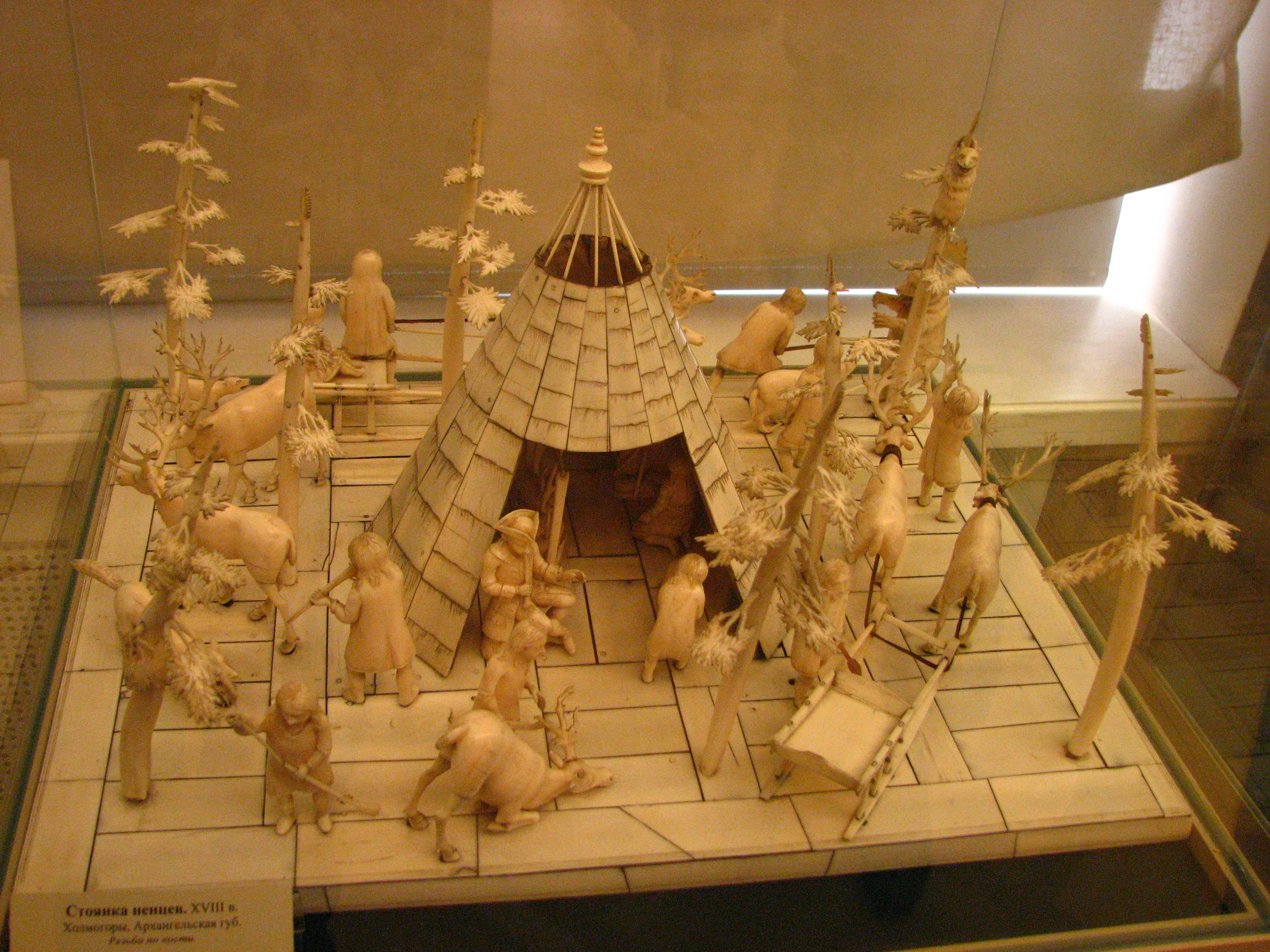
Kholmogory bone carving: A walrus ivory model of the Nenets encampment

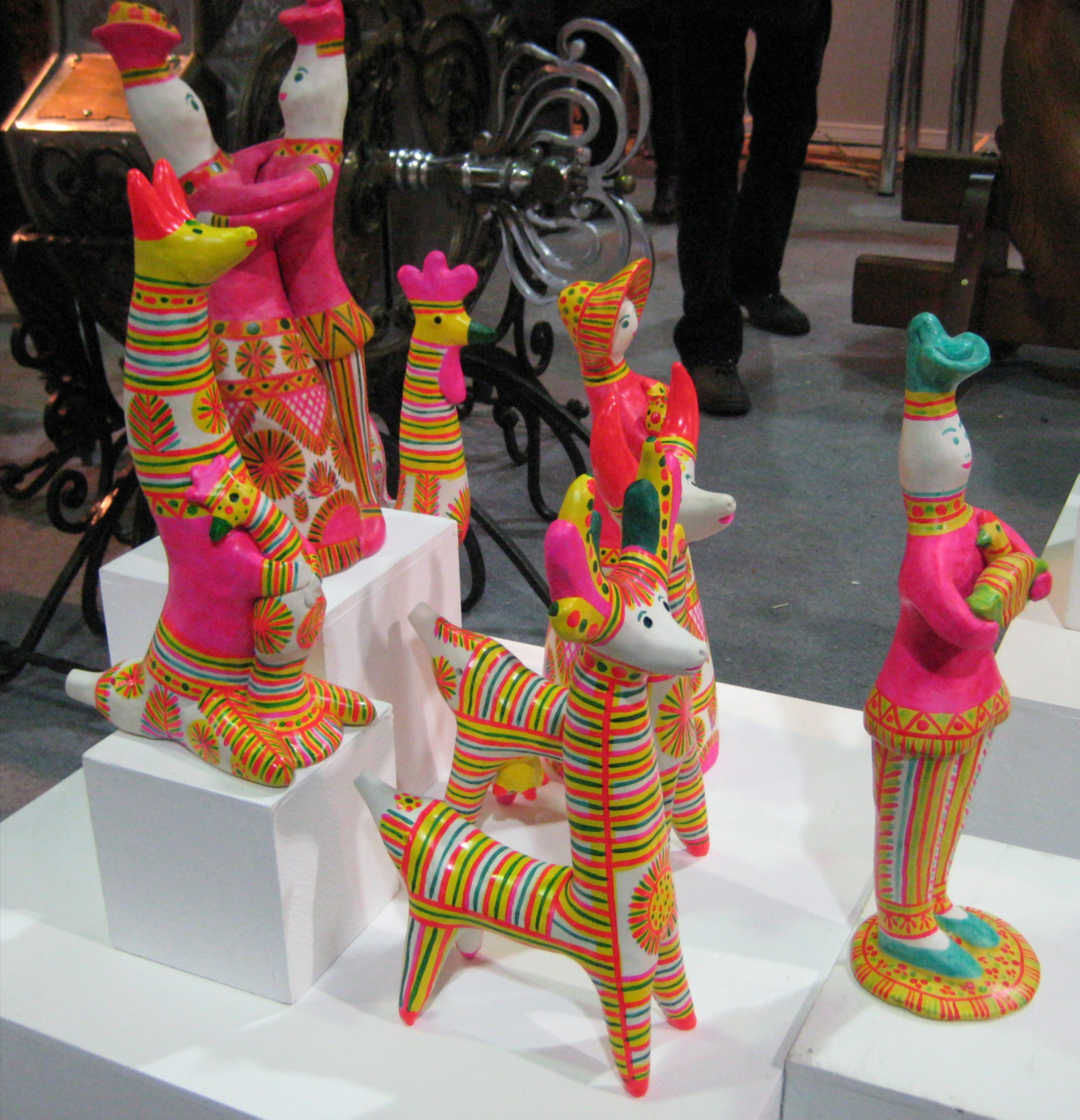
Some Filimonovo toys

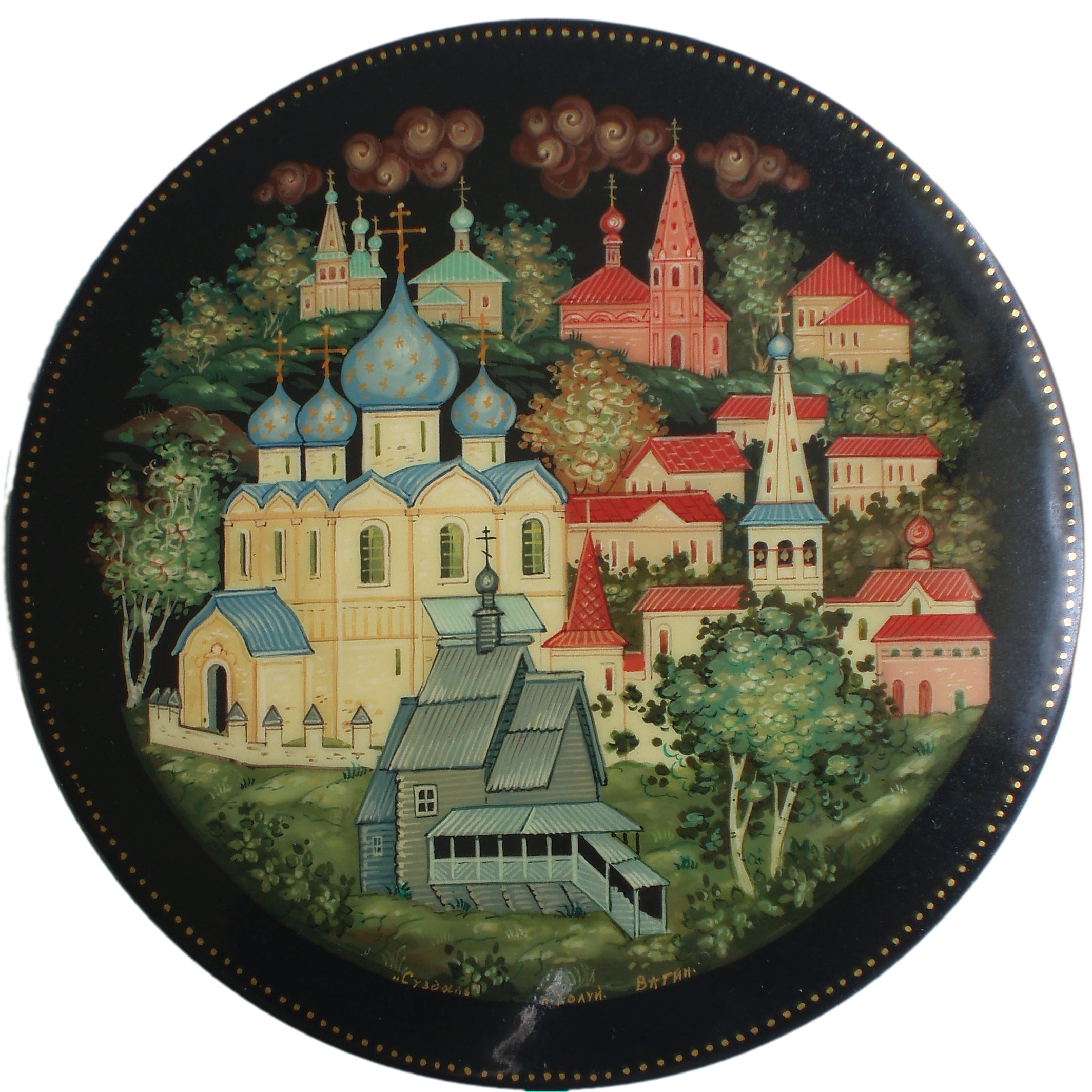
Lacquered box with a Kholuy miniature, depicting the town of Suzdal

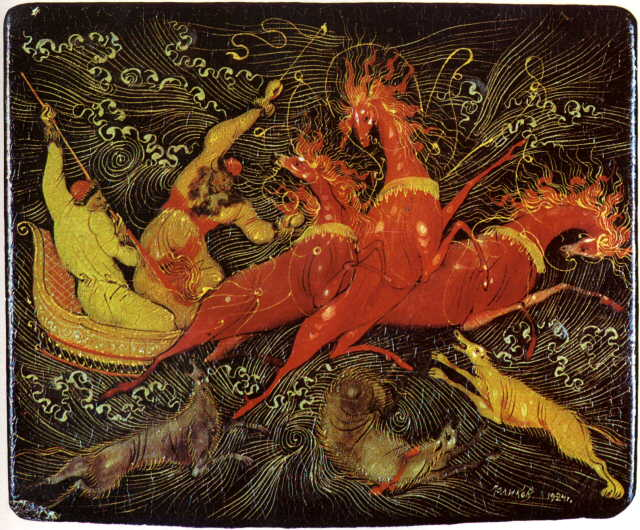
Troika with wolves.Palekh miniature

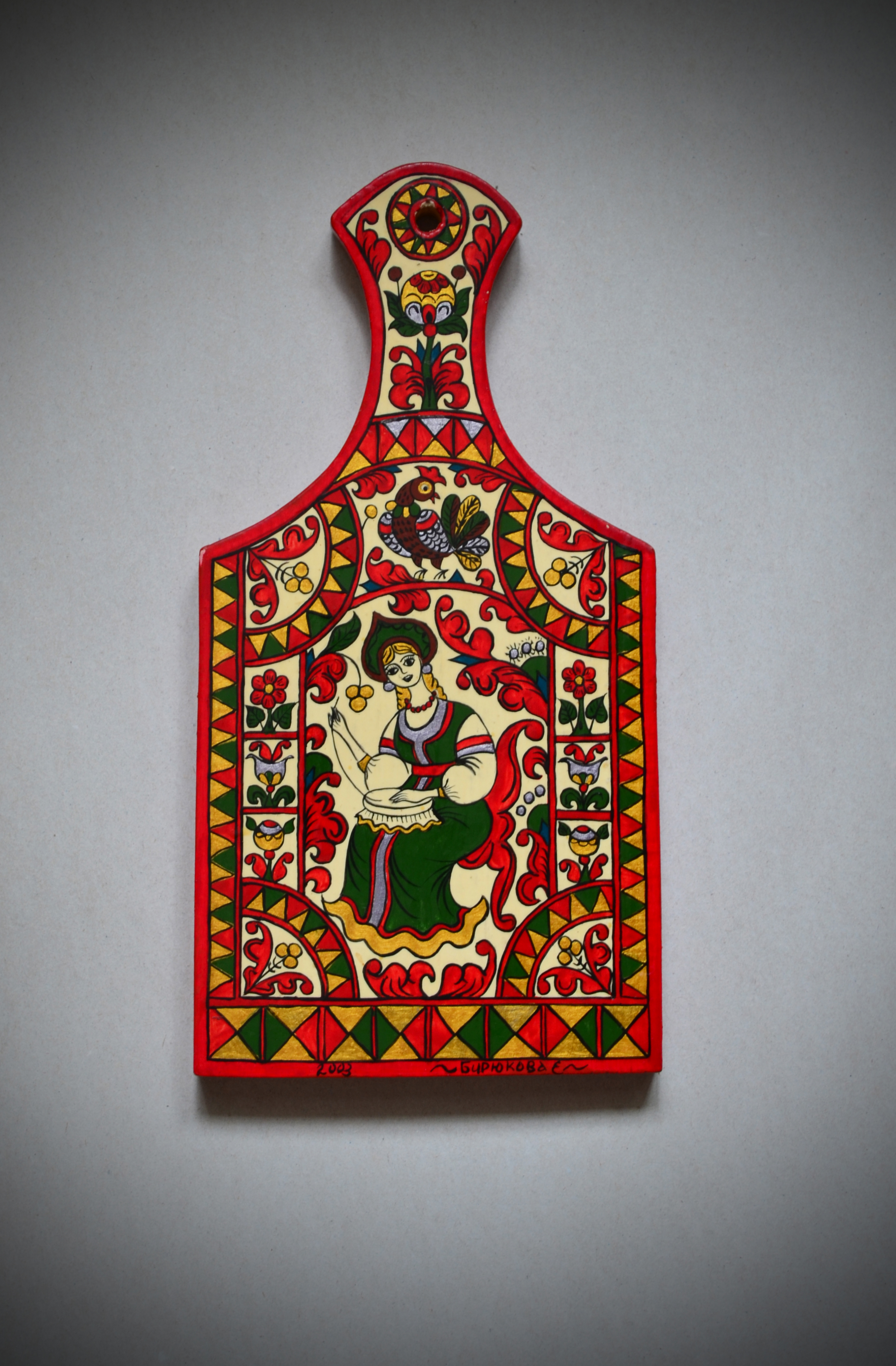
A Permogorsk painting on wood

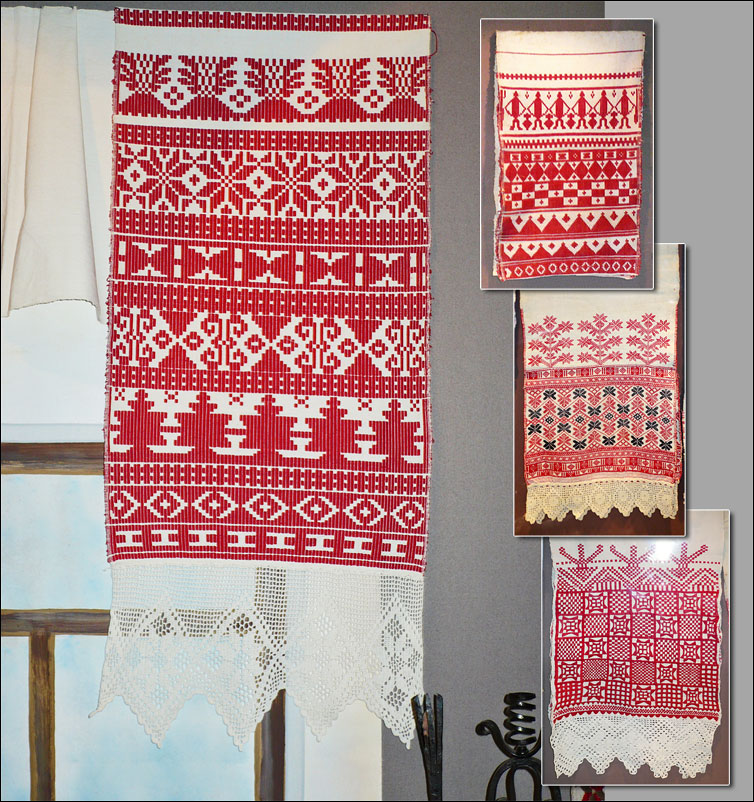
Rushnyk, old traditional Russian weaving style. The patterns vary between regions, and can be found across Russian history in textiles and Russian architecture

=== Historical paintings depicting average Russians and their clothing ===
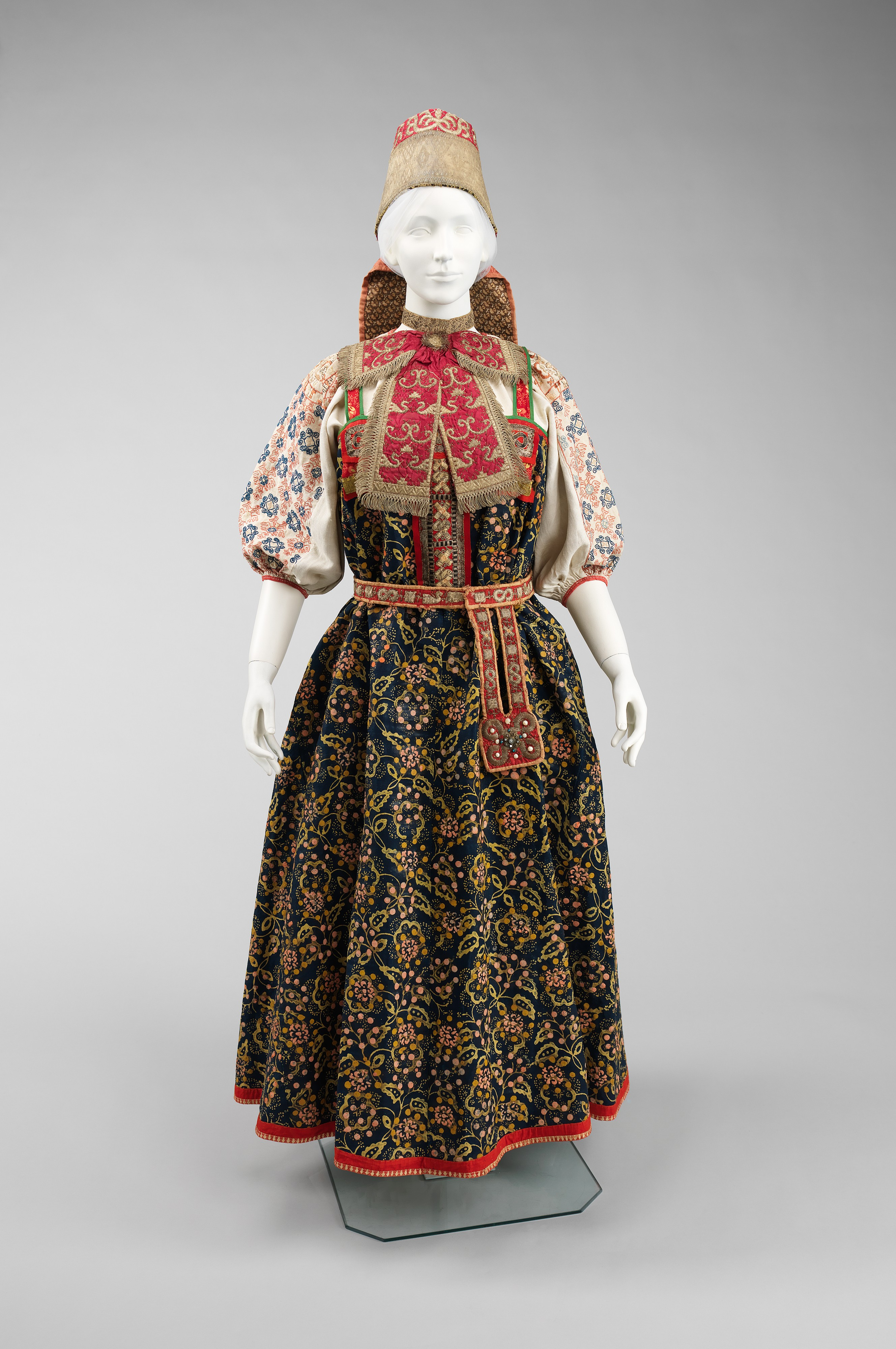
Russian clothing, ca. 17th–19th century. Metropolitan Museum of Art.

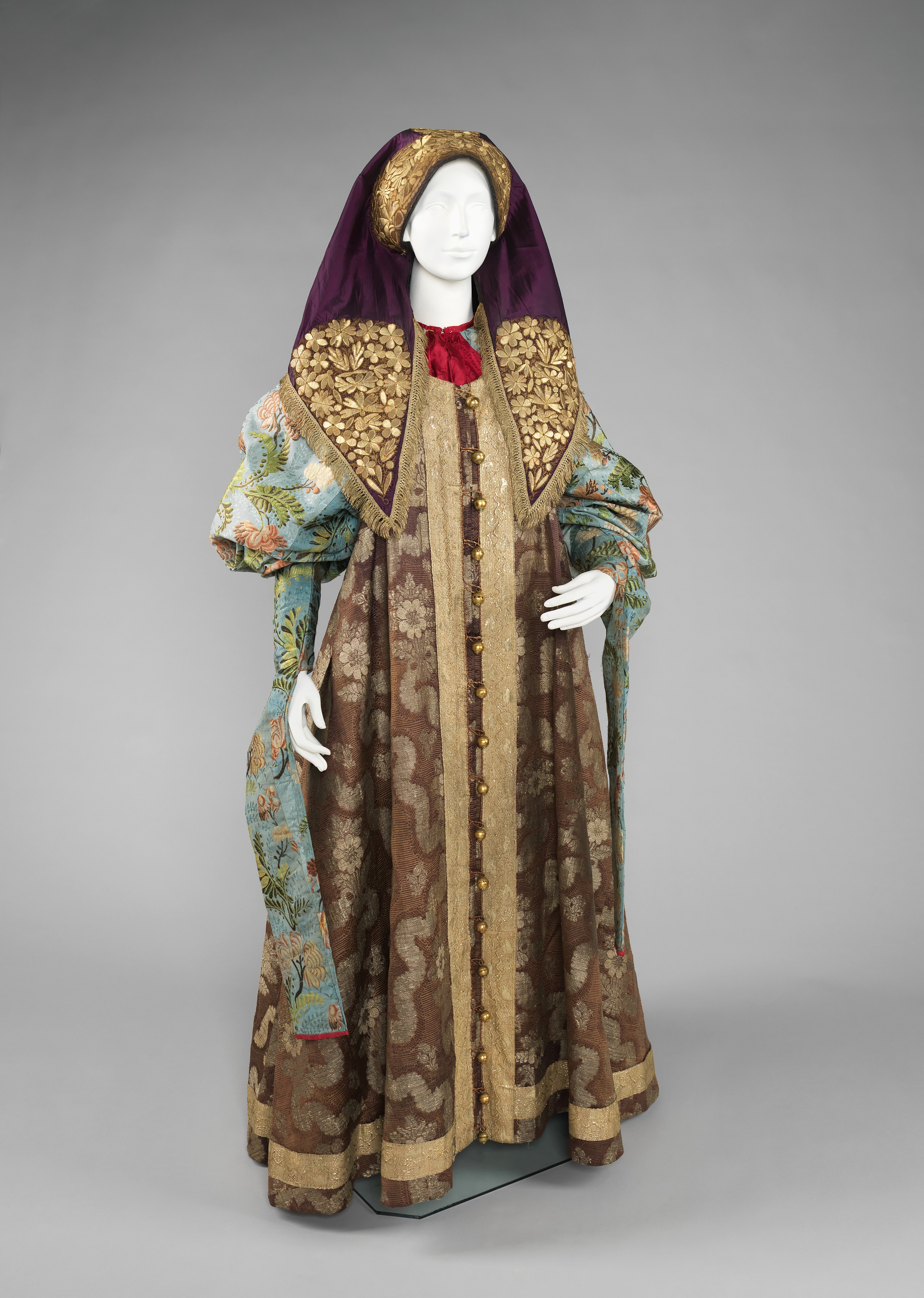
Russian clothing, late 18th–19th century. Metropolitan Museum of Art.

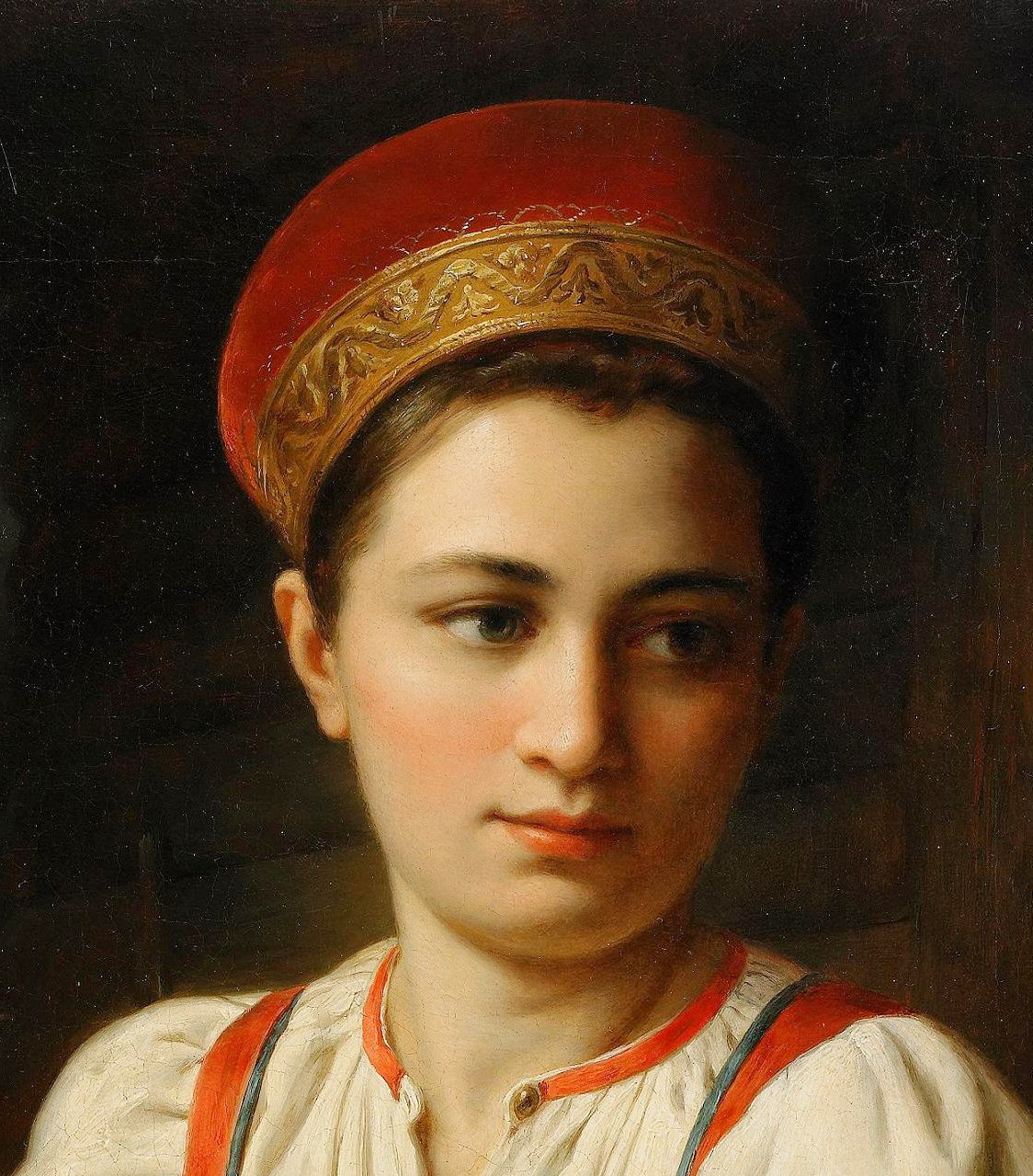
Peasant girl with kokoshnik headdress, ca. 19th century.

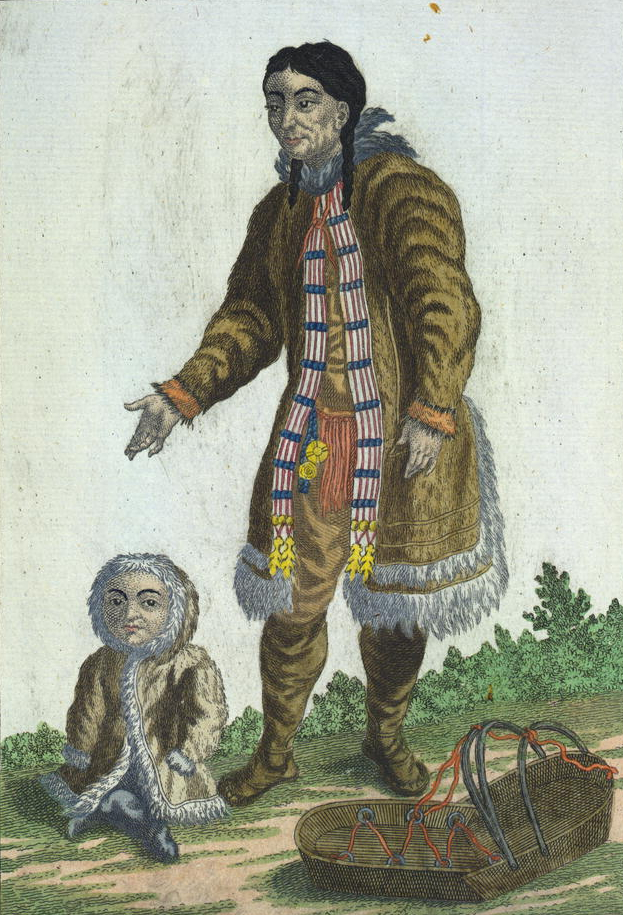
Samoyed in summer dress, in 1781, by Johann Gottlieb Georgi, Siberia

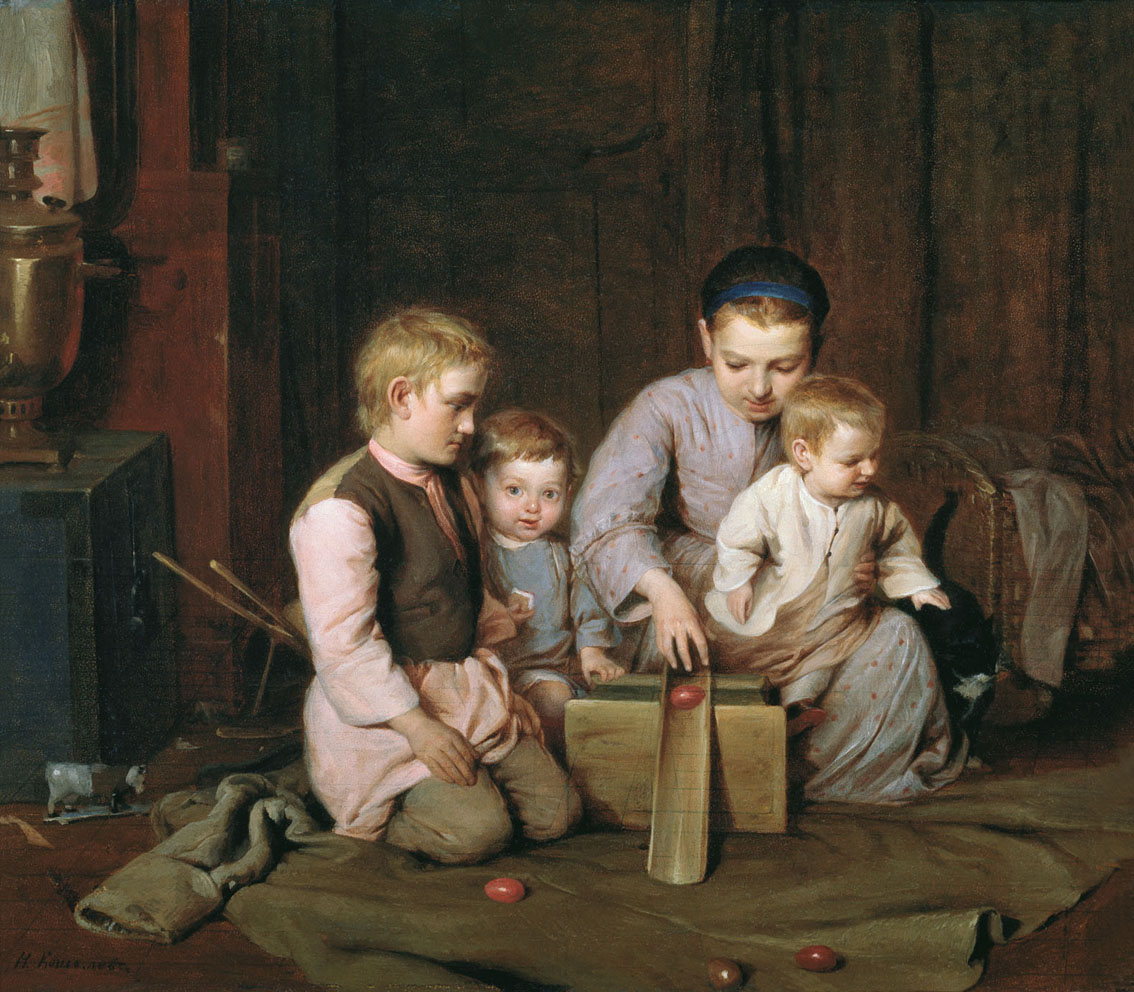
Children, let the Easter eggs roll, ca. 1855, by Nikolay Koshelev. Russian Museum.

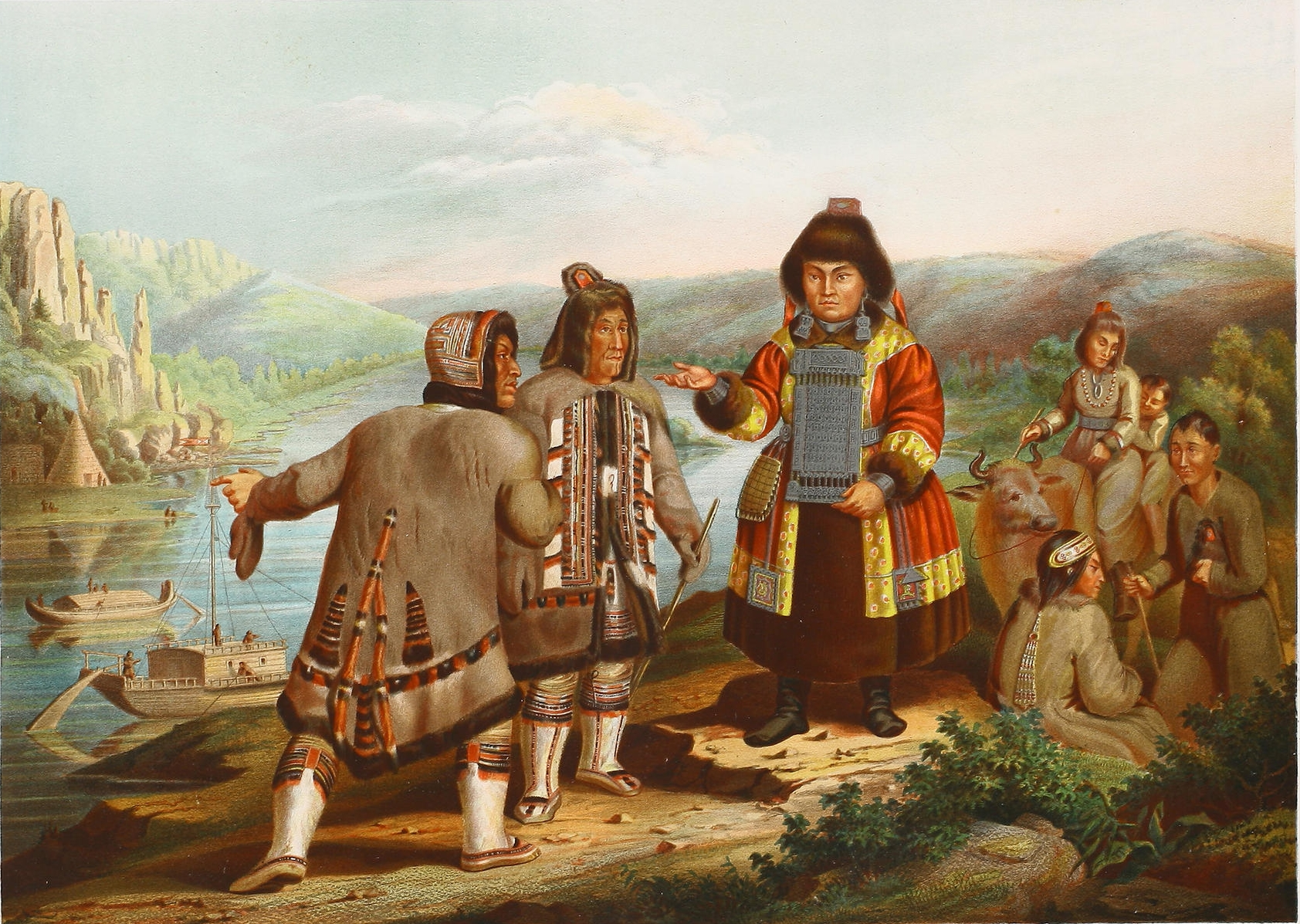
Yakutians, ca. 1862 by Gustav Pauli, Eastern Siberia

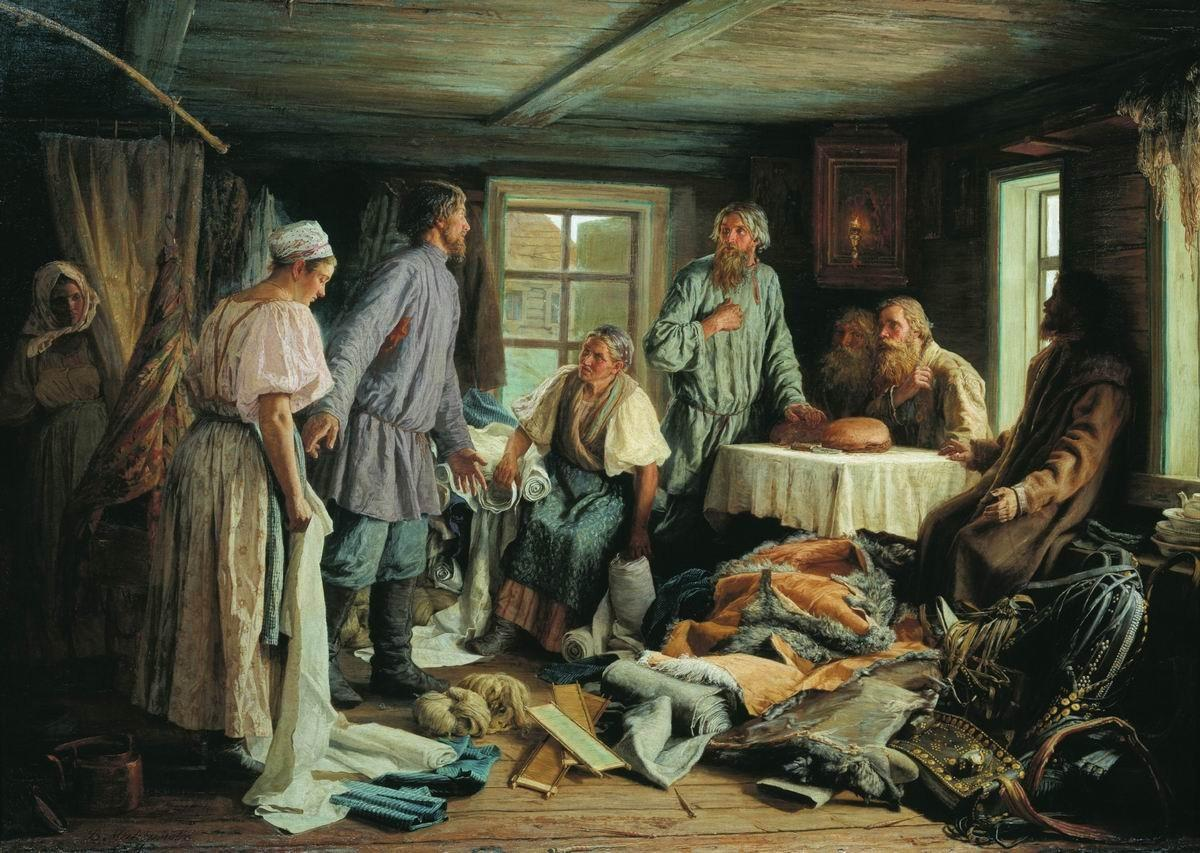
Russian peasants, ca. 1871, by Vassily Maximov.

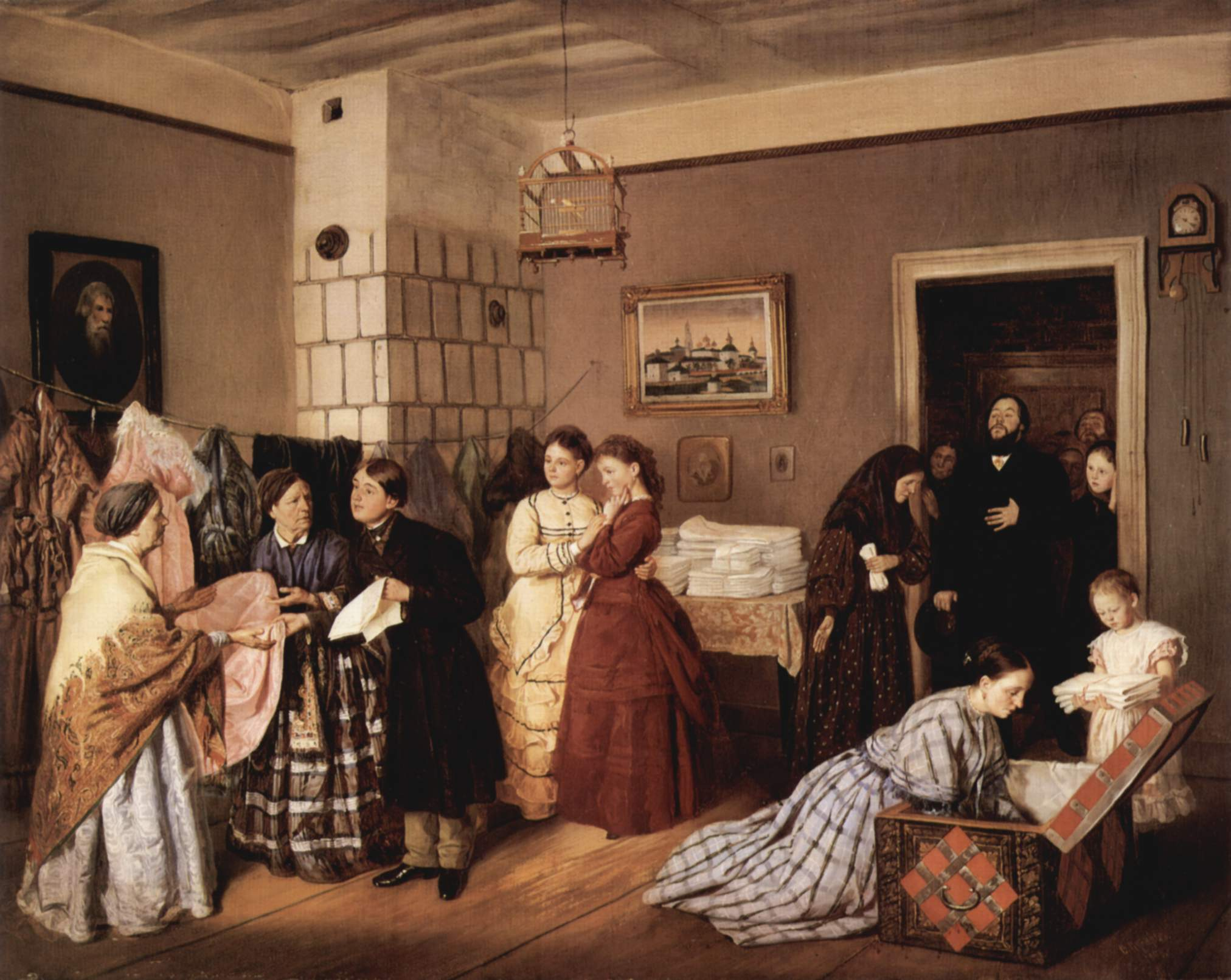
Acceptance of dowry in a business family, ca. 1873, by Vasili Pukirev.

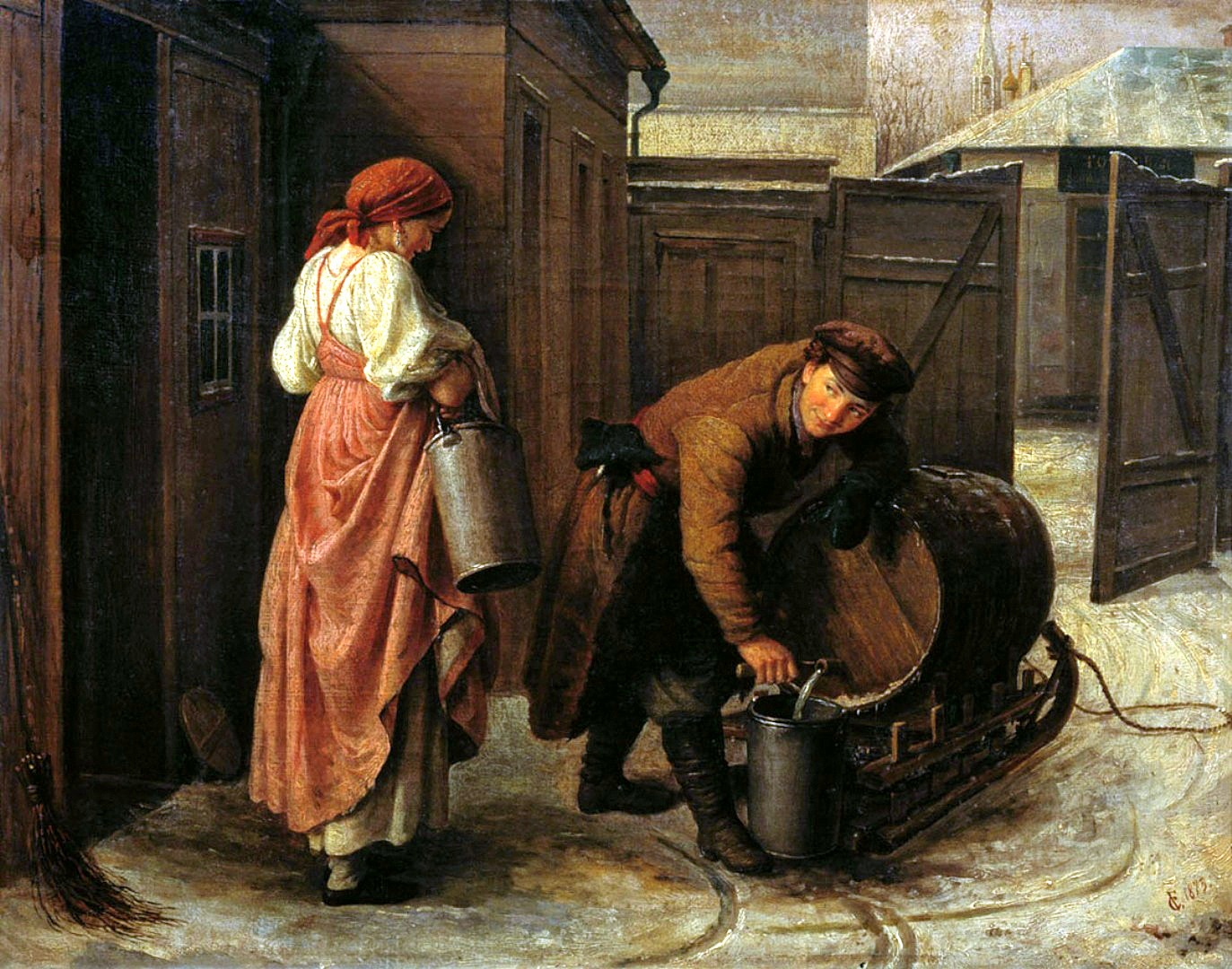
Water Carrier, in inland Russia, in 1873, by Sergei Gribkov

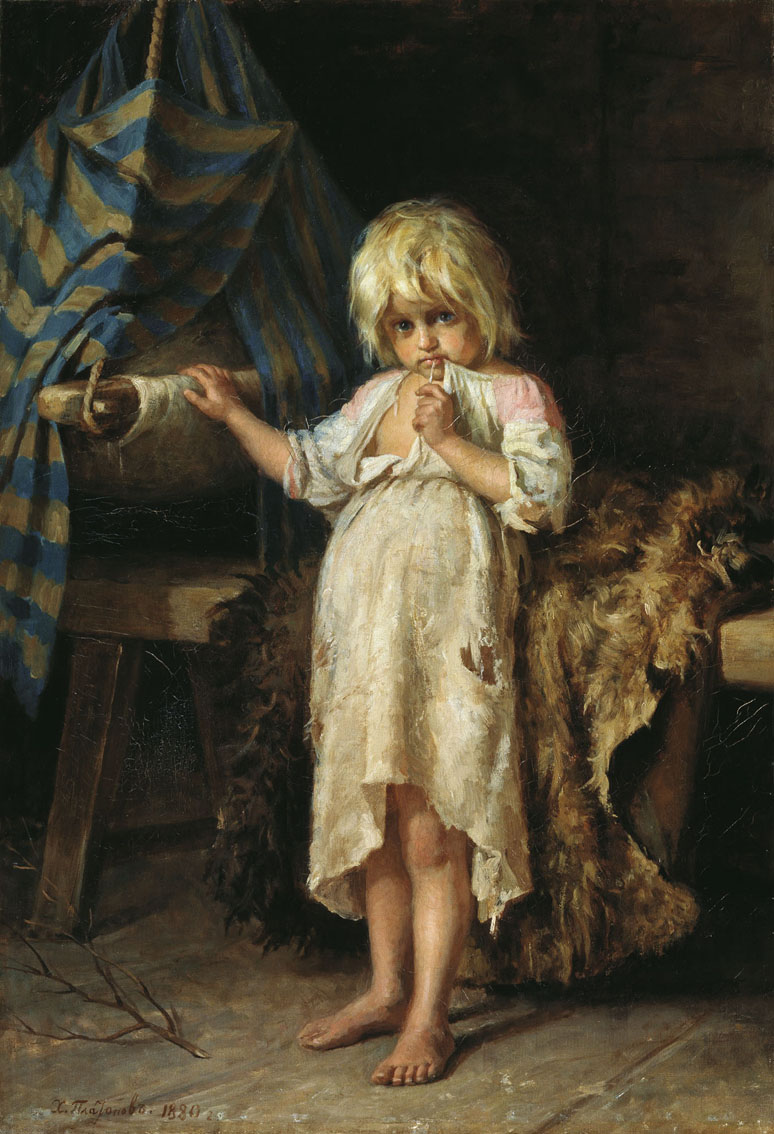
The Little Baby-Sitter, in 1880 by Khariton Platonov, Russia.

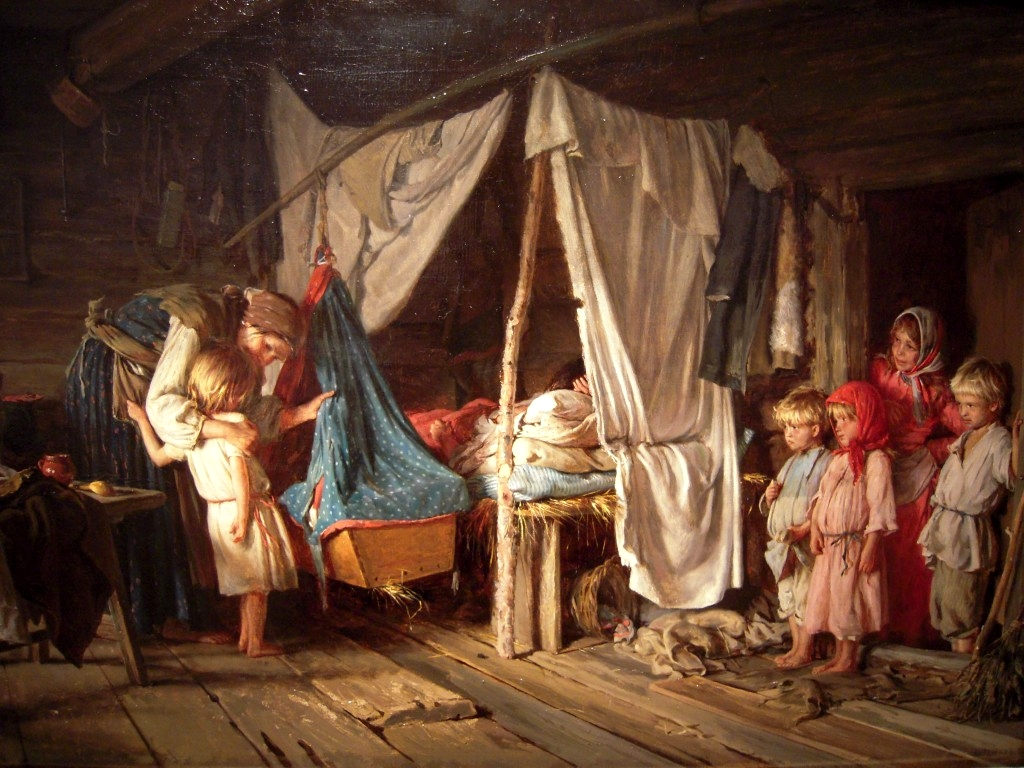
Russian family, in 1885, by Kirill Lemokh.

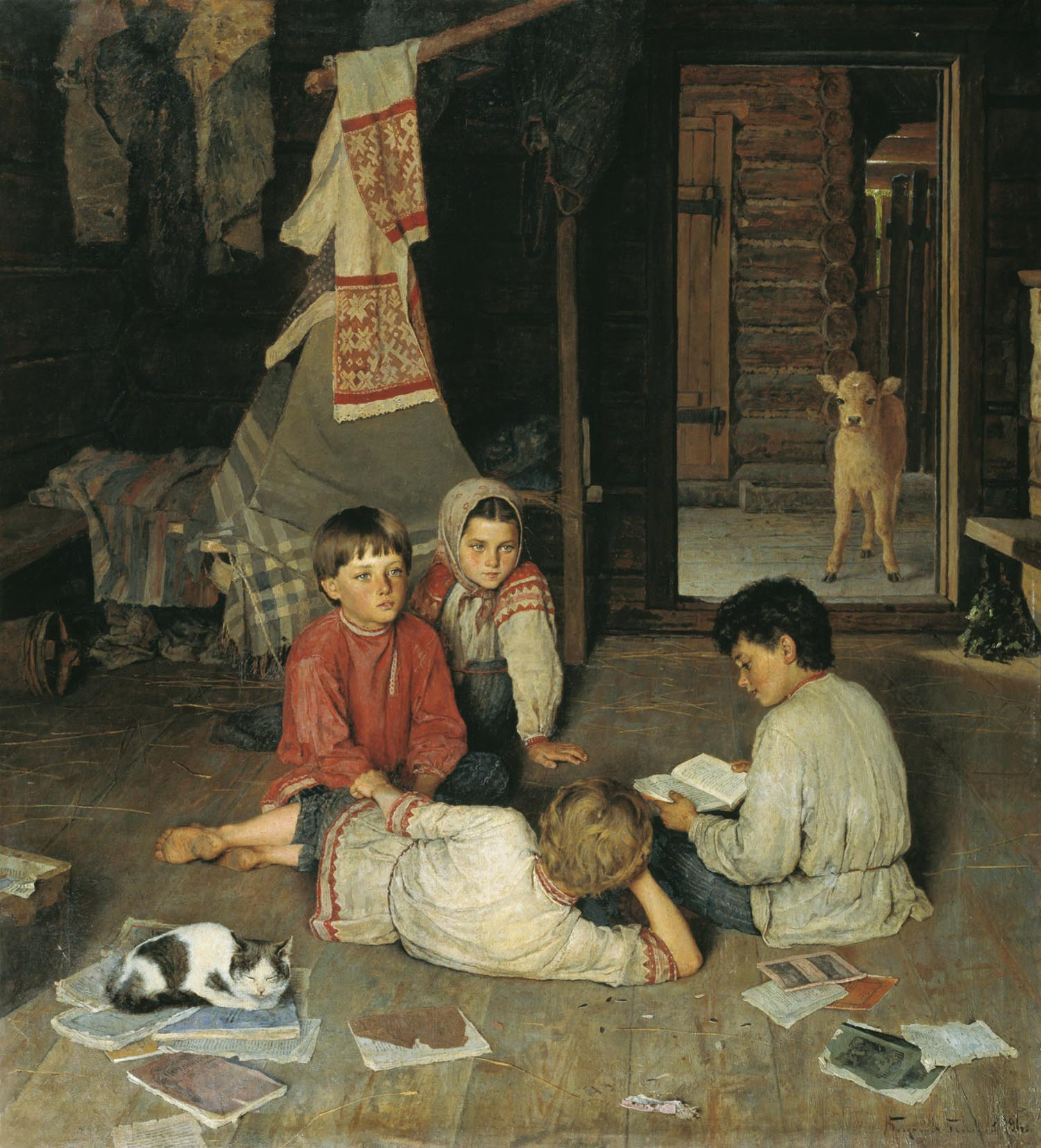
Russian brothers reading a tale, in 1891, by Nikolay Bogdanov-Belsky. Belarusian National Arts Museum

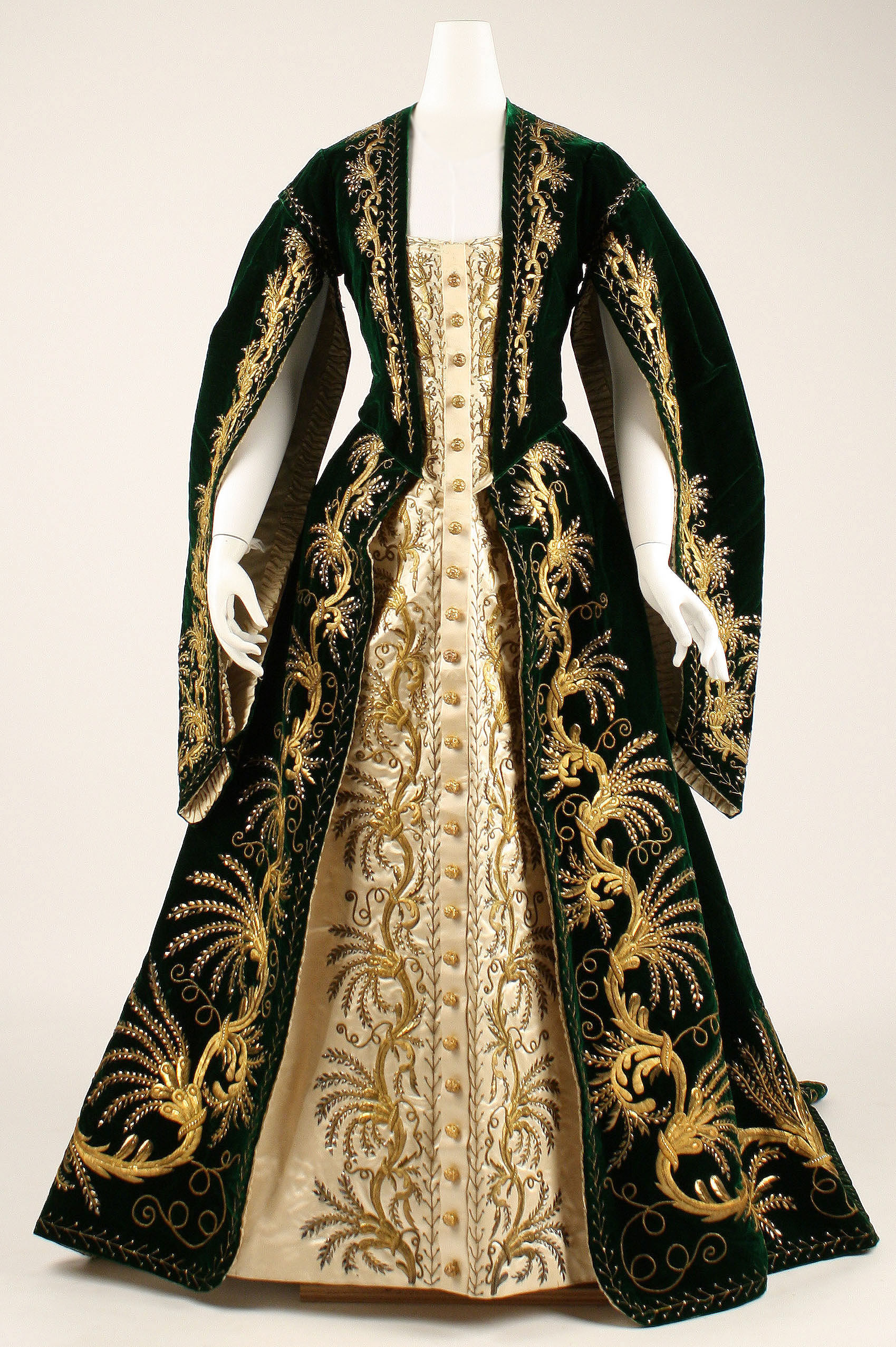
Court robe, Russian, ca. 1900. Metropolitan Museum of Art.

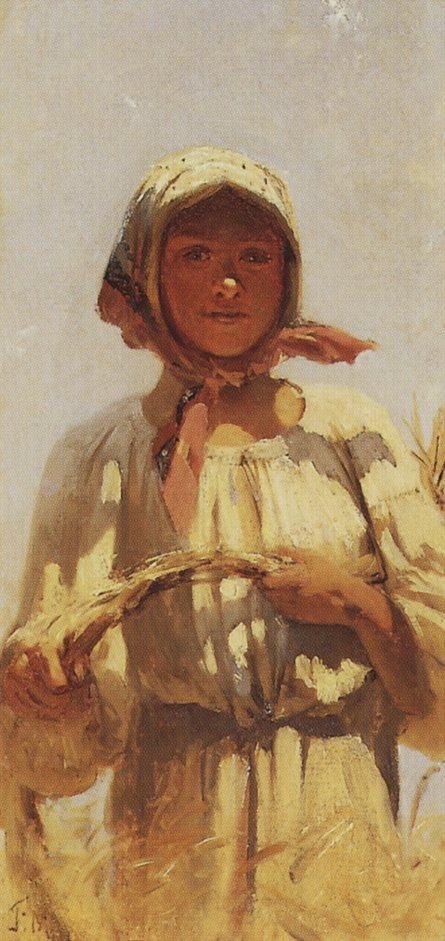
"The Reaper" by Grigoriy Myasoyedov, before 1911

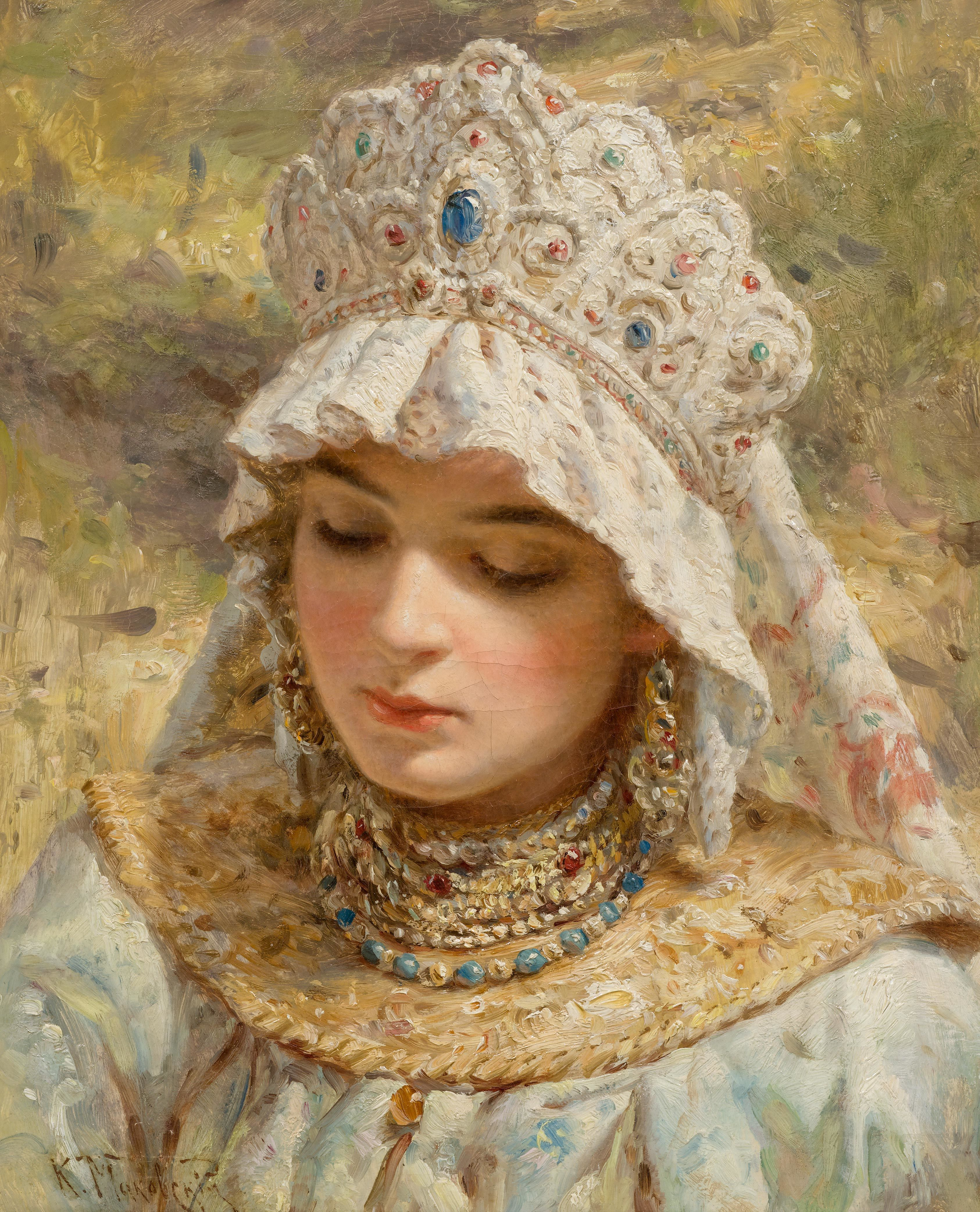
Russian girl with kokoshnik, before 1915, by Konstantin Makovsky

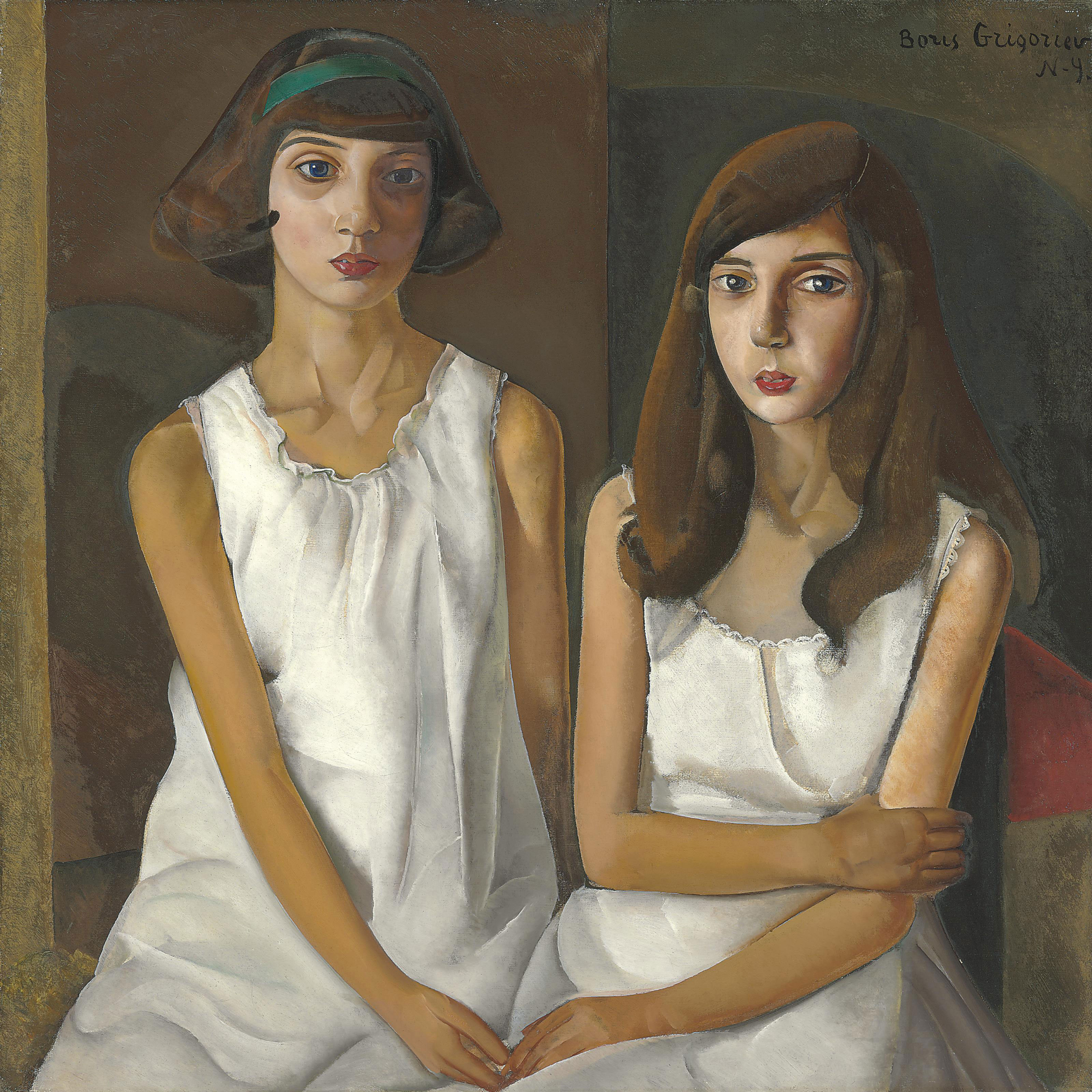
Two girls by Boris Grigoriev, early 20th century, Soviet Russia.

=== Icon painting ===
Triptych with Christ, the Virgin, and St. John the Evangelist; 1800s; pigment on wood, in cloisonné enamelled insert; overall: 7.9 x 21.9 x 2 cm; Cleveland Museum of Art (USA)

Russian icons are typically paintings on wood, often small, though some in churches and monasteries may be as large as a table top. Many religious homes in Russia have icons hanging on the wall in the krasny ugol, the "red" or "beautiful" corner (see Icon Corner). There is a rich history and elaborate religious symbolism associated with icons. In Russian churches, the nave is typically separated from the sanctuary by an iconostasis (Russian ikonostás) a wall of icons. Icon paintings in Russia attempted to help people with their prayers without idolizing the figure in the painting. The most comprehensive collection of Icon art is found at the Tretyakov Gallery.

The use and making of icons entered Kievan Rus' following its conversion to Orthodox Christianity from the Eastern Roman (Byzantine) Empire in 988 AD. As a general rule, these icons strictly followed models and formulas hallowed by usage, some of which had originated in Constantinople. As time passed, the Russians—notably Andrei Rublev and Dionisius—widened the vocabulary of iconic types and styles far beyond anything found elsewhere. The personal, improvisatory and creative traditions of Western European religious art are largely lacking in Russia before the seventeenth century, when Simon Ushakov's painting became strongly influenced by religious paintings and engravings from Protestant as well as Catholic Europe.

In the mid-seventeenth century, changes in liturgy and practice instituted by Patriarch Nikon resulted in a split in the Russian Orthodox Church. The traditionalists, the persecuted "Old Ritualists" or "Old Believers", continued the traditional stylization of icons, while the State Church modified its practice. From that time icons began to be painted not only in the traditional stylized and nonrealistic mode, but also in a mixture of Russian stylization and Western European realism, and in a Western European manner very much like that of Catholic religious art of the time. The Stroganov movement and the icons from Nevyansk rank among the last important schools of Russian icon-painting.

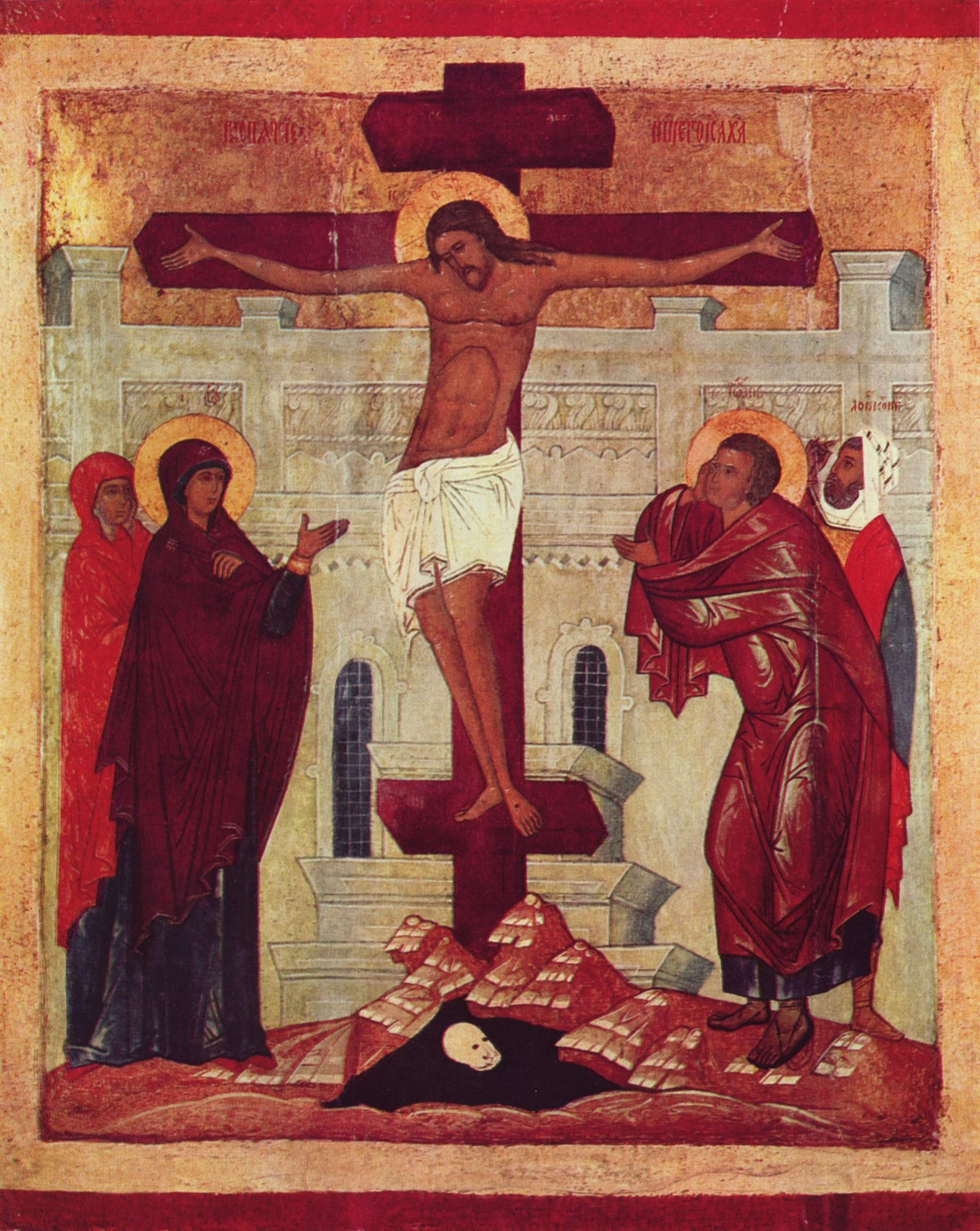
Icon of the Crucifixion; circa 1360; by the Novgorod school; Louvre (Paris)

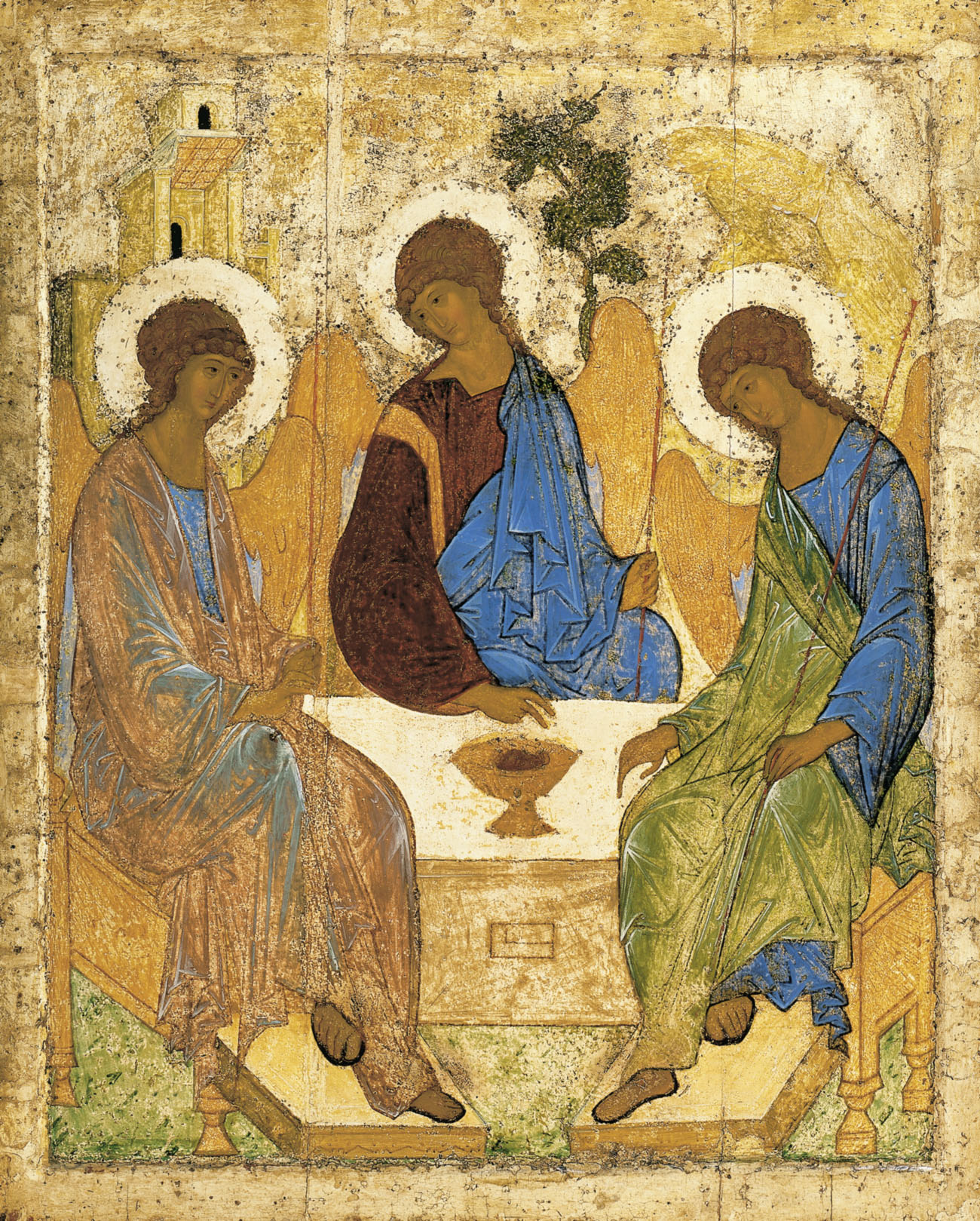
Holy Trinity, Hospitality of Abraham; by Andrei Rublev; c. 1411; tempera on panel; 1.1 x 1.4 m (4 ft 8 in x 3 ft 8 3/4 in); Tretyakov Gallery (Moscow)

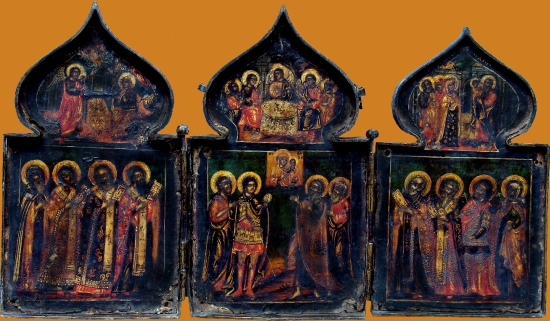
A three-leaved fold with the image of the "Annunciation", "Trinity" and "Presentation"; the end of the 17th century; temperaon wood; 13 x 7.3 cm; National Art Museum of Azerbaijan (Baku)

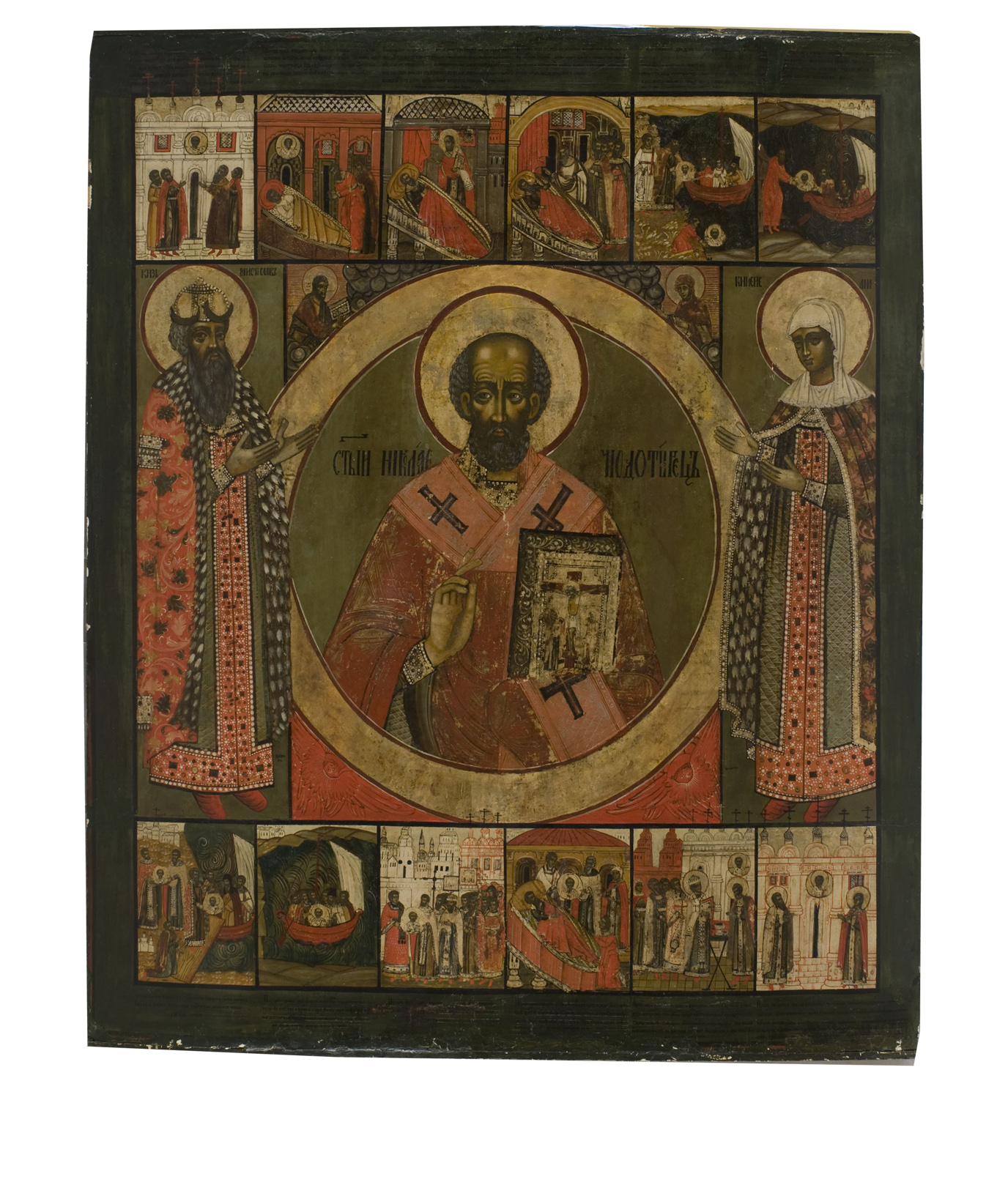
Icon of St. Nicholas the Wonderworker (Dvorischensky); 18th century; wood, gesso & tempera; Ryabushinsky Museum of Icons and Paintings (Moscow)

=== Lubok ===
A lubok (plural Lubki, Cyrillic: Russian: лубо́к, лубо́чная картинка) is a Russian popular print, characterized by simple graphics and narratives derived from literature, religious stories and popular tales. Lubki prints were used as decoration in houses and inns. Early examples from the late 17th and early 18th centuries were woodcuts, then engravings or etchings were typical, and from the mid-19th century lithography. They sometimes appeared in series, which might be regarded as predecessors of the modern comic strip. Cheap and simple books, similar to chapbooks, which mostly consisted of pictures, are called lubok literature or (Cyrillic: Russian: лубочная литература). Both pictures and literature are commonly referred to simply as lubki. The Russian word lubok derives from lub – a special type of board that pictures were printed on.

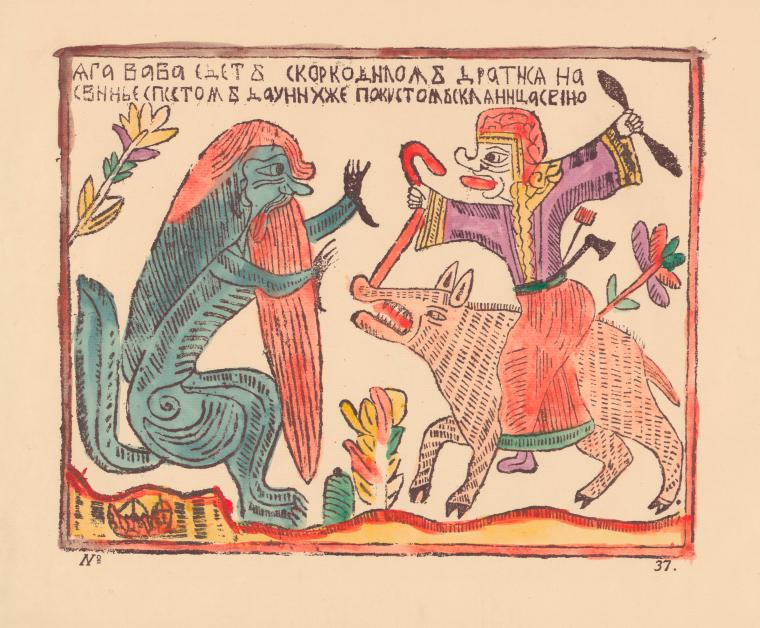
Baba Yaga riding a pig and fighting the infernal Crocodile; 17th century

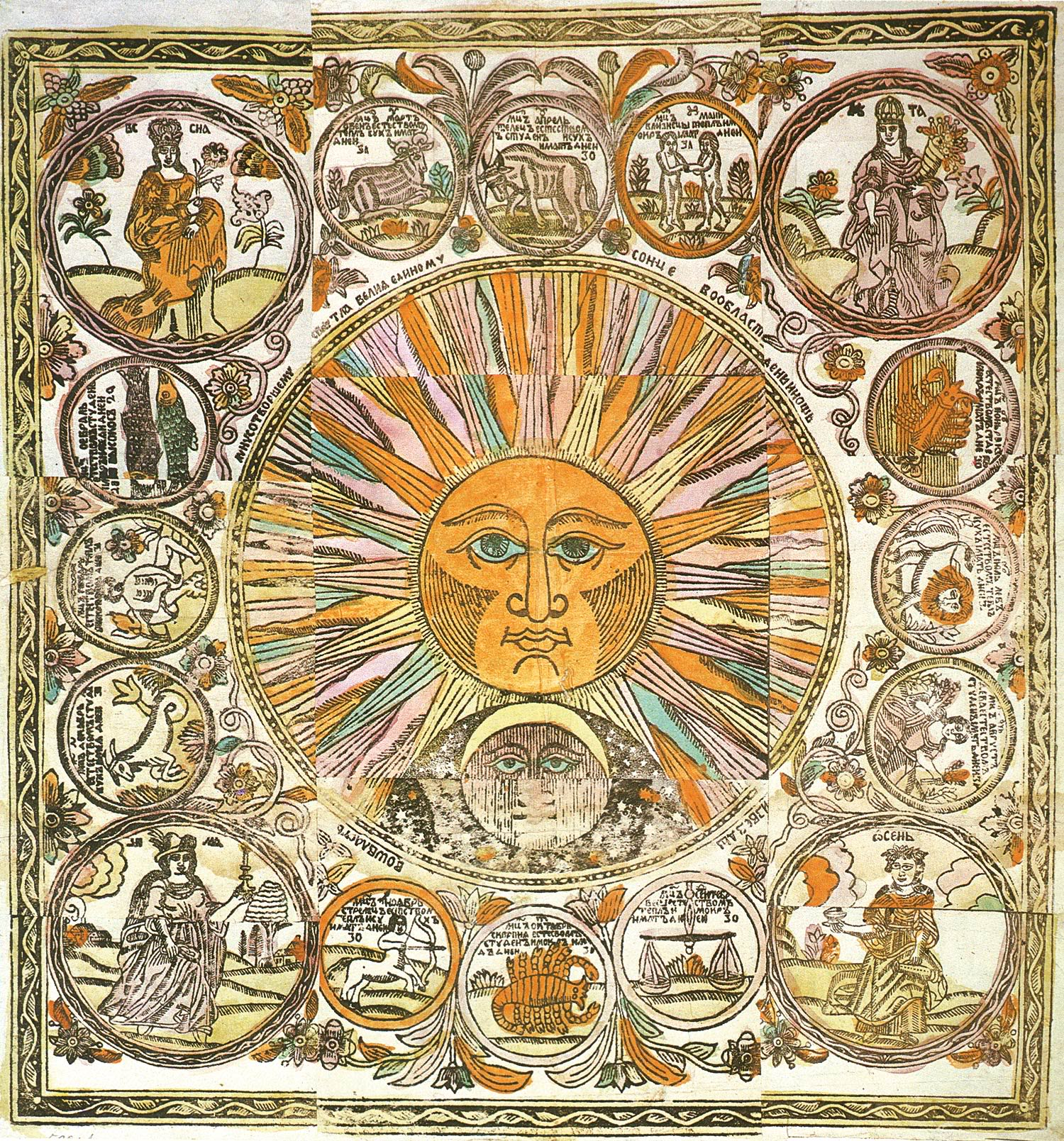
The sun, moon, seasons and 12 months in the form of signs of the zodiac; the end of the 17th-early 18th century

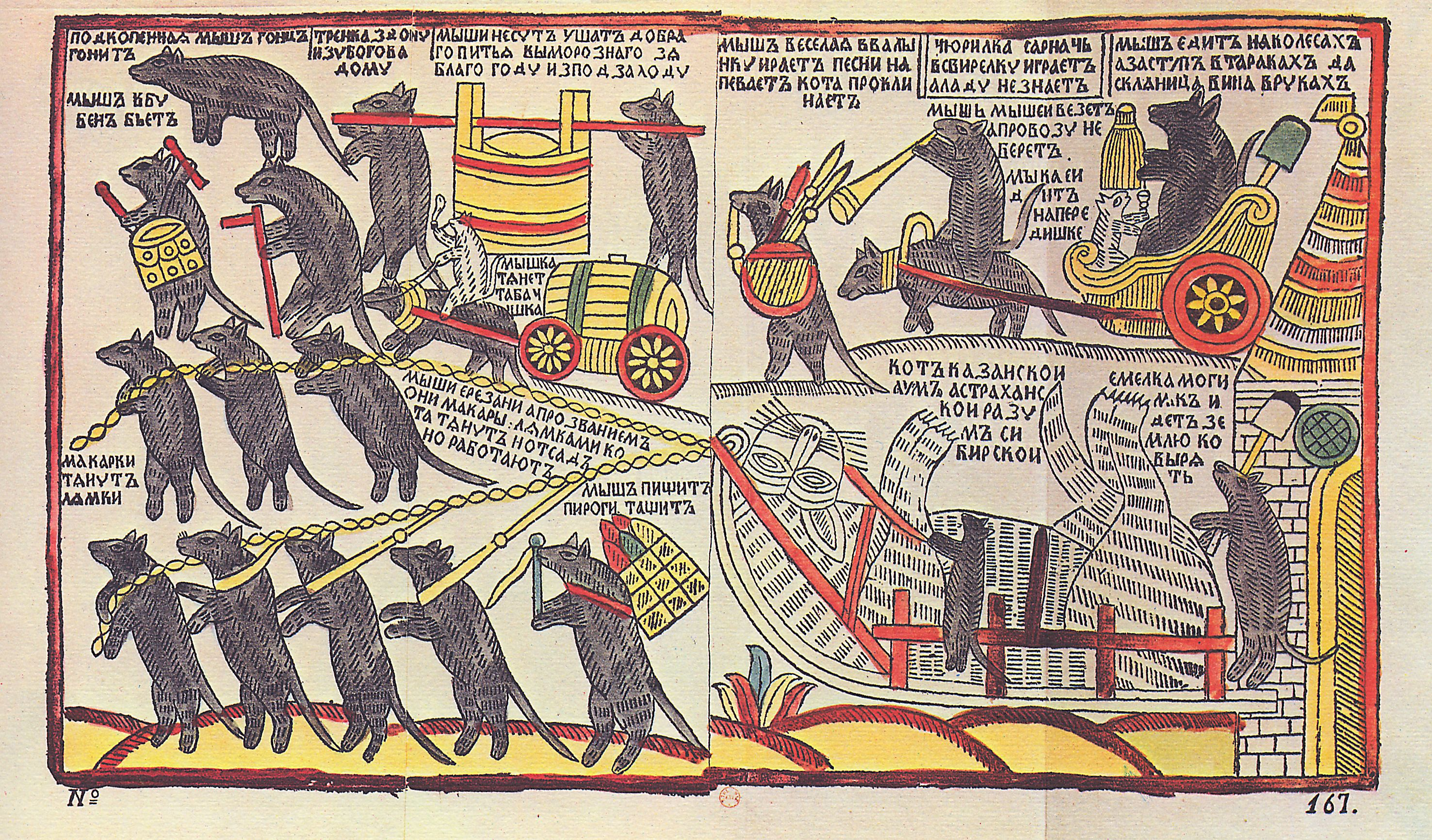
The Mice are burying the Cat; 18th century

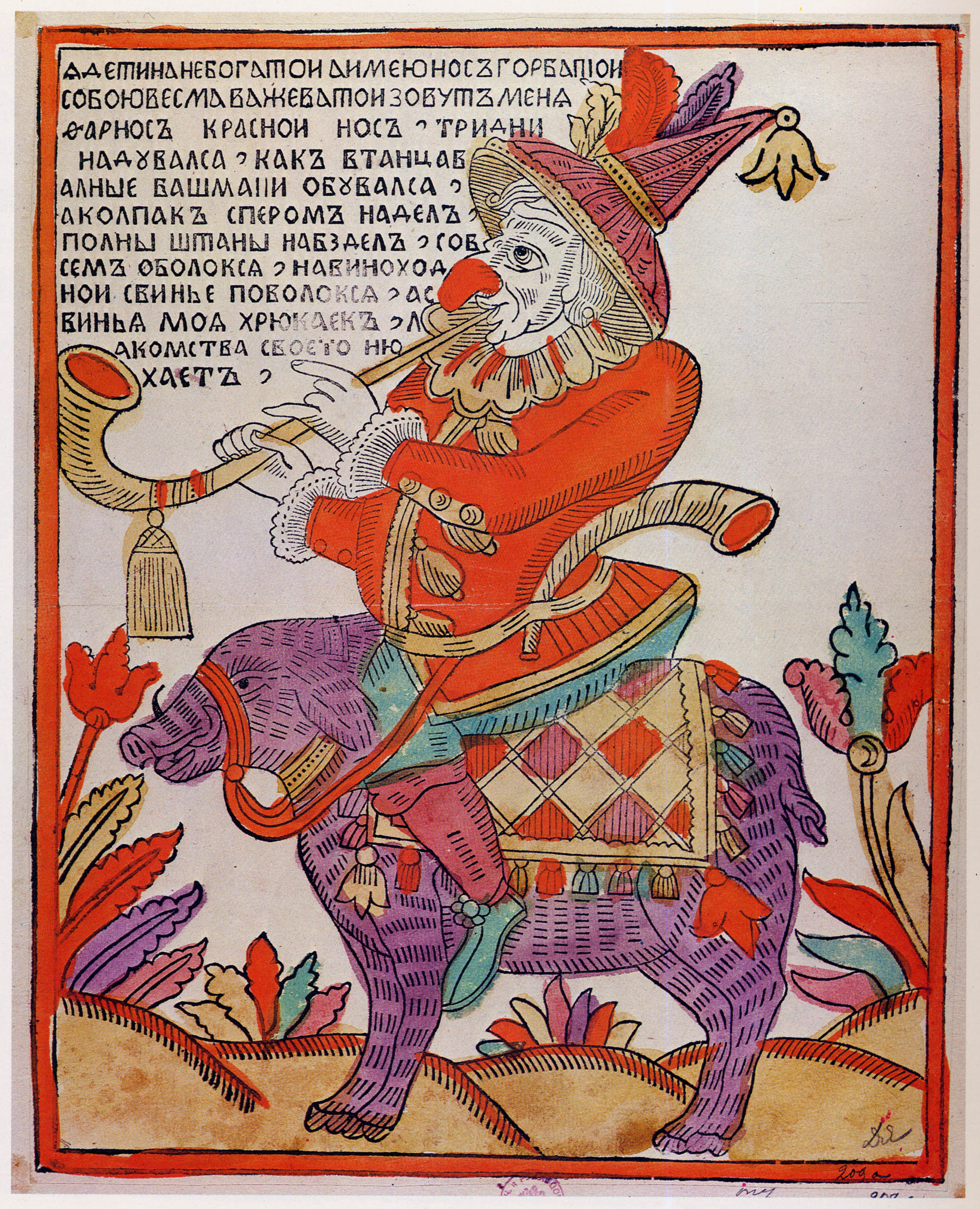
Farnos the Red Nose (lubok depicting a pig-riding jester); 18th century

=== Baroque, Classical and Romanticist painting ===
The Russian Academy of Arts was created in 1757 with the aim of giving Russian artists an international role and status. Notable portrait painters from the academy include Ivan Argunov, Fyodor Rokotov, Dmitry Levitzky, and Vladimir Borovikovsky.

In the early 19th century, when neoclassicism and romanticism flourished, famous academic artists focused on mythological and Biblical themes, like Karl Briullov, Orest Kiprensky, Ivan Aivazovsky and Alexander Ivanov.

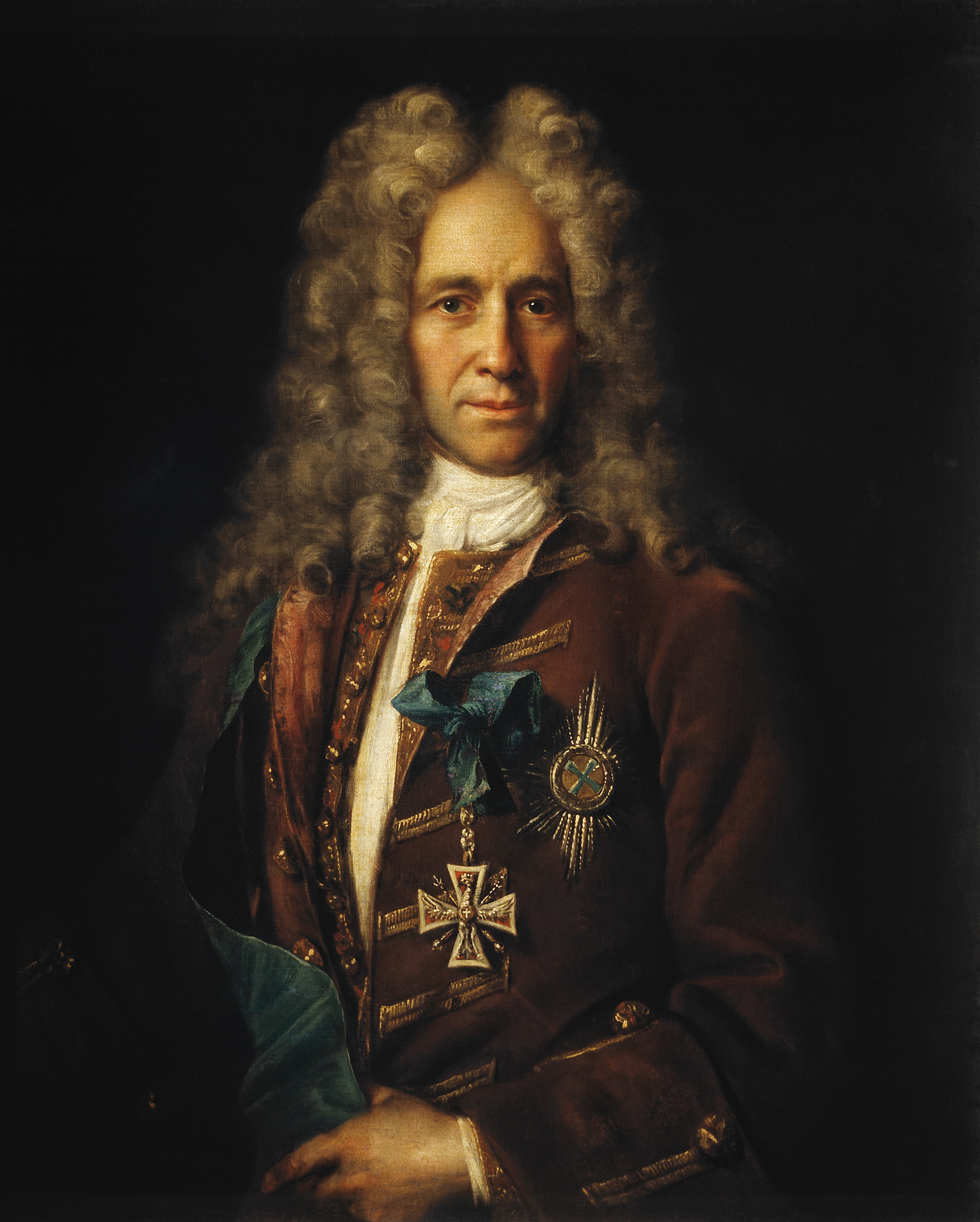
Portrait of Chancellor Gavriil Golovkin by Ivan Nikitin (1720)

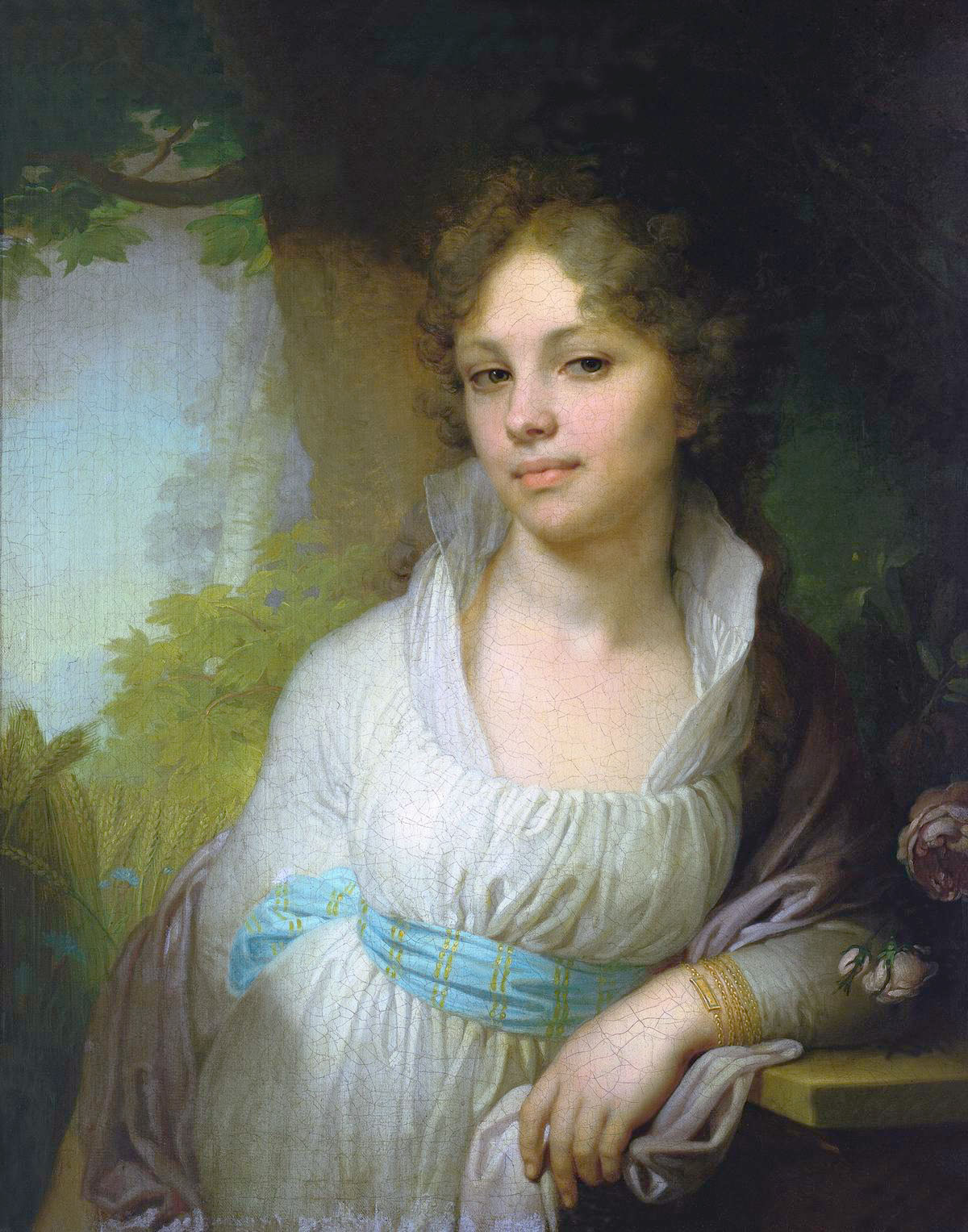
Portrait of Maria Lopukhina by Vladimir Borovikovsky (1797)

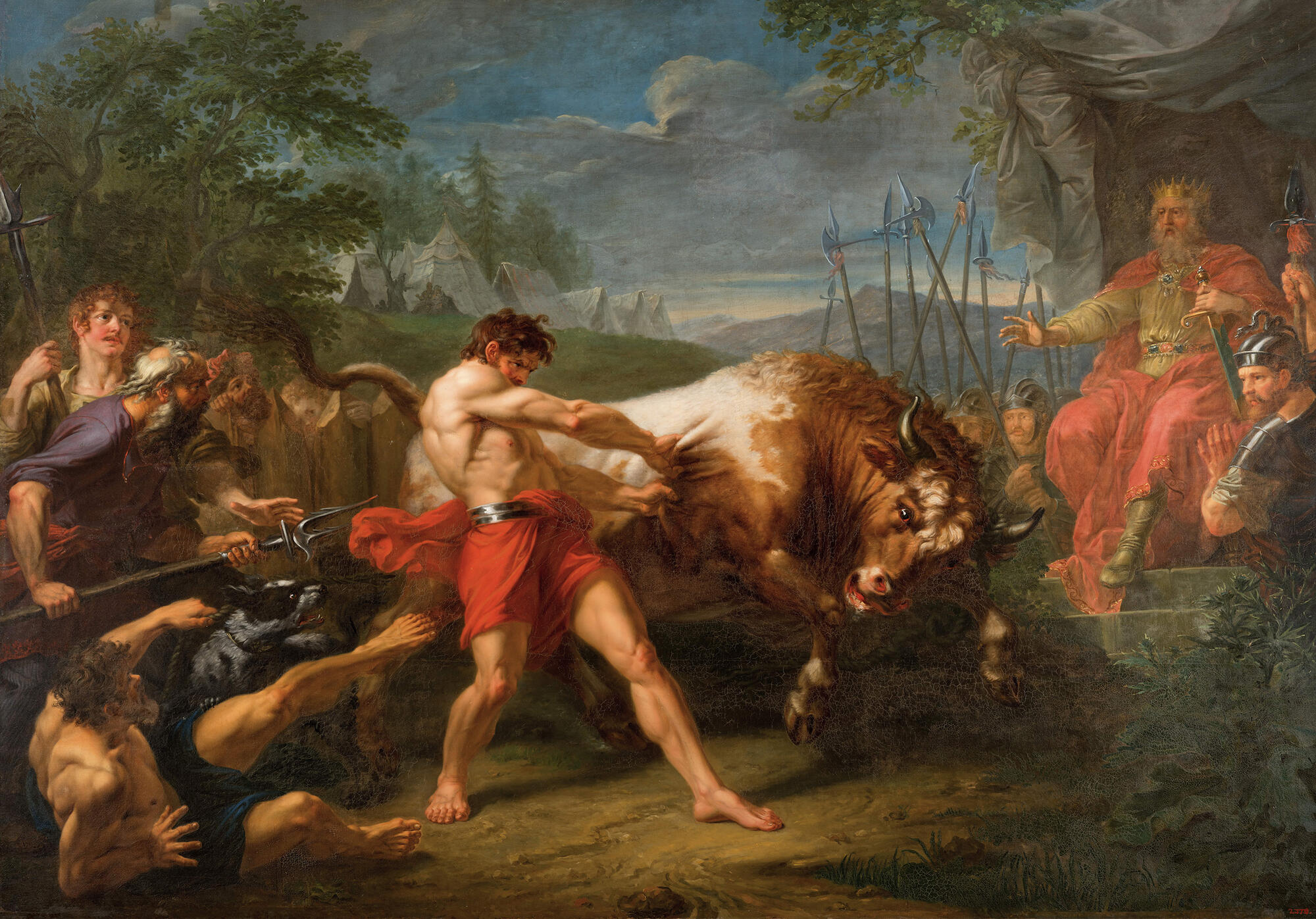
Testing the strength of Jan Usmar by Grigory Ugryumov (1797)

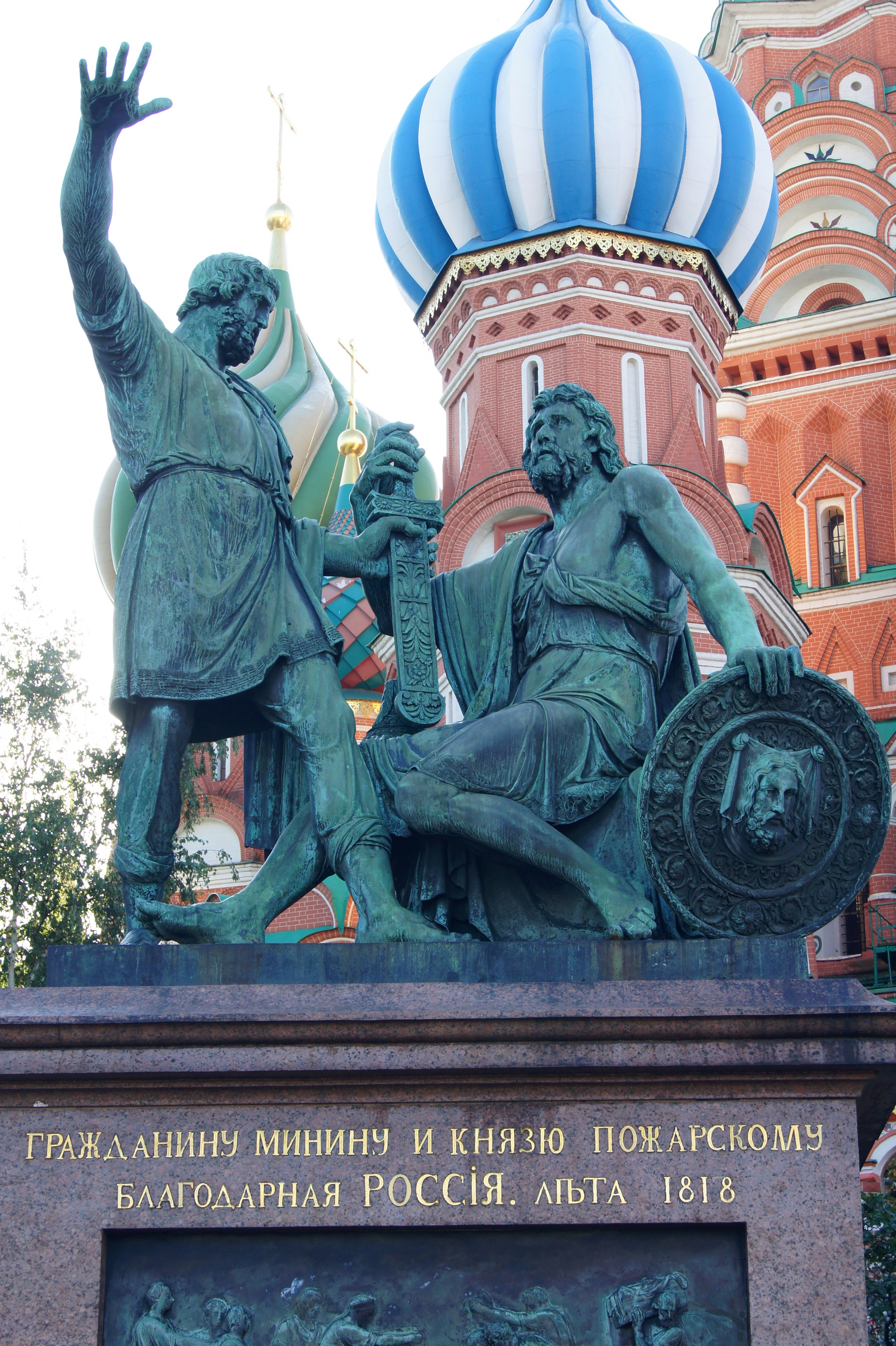
Monument to Minin and Pozharsky by Ivan Martos (1818)

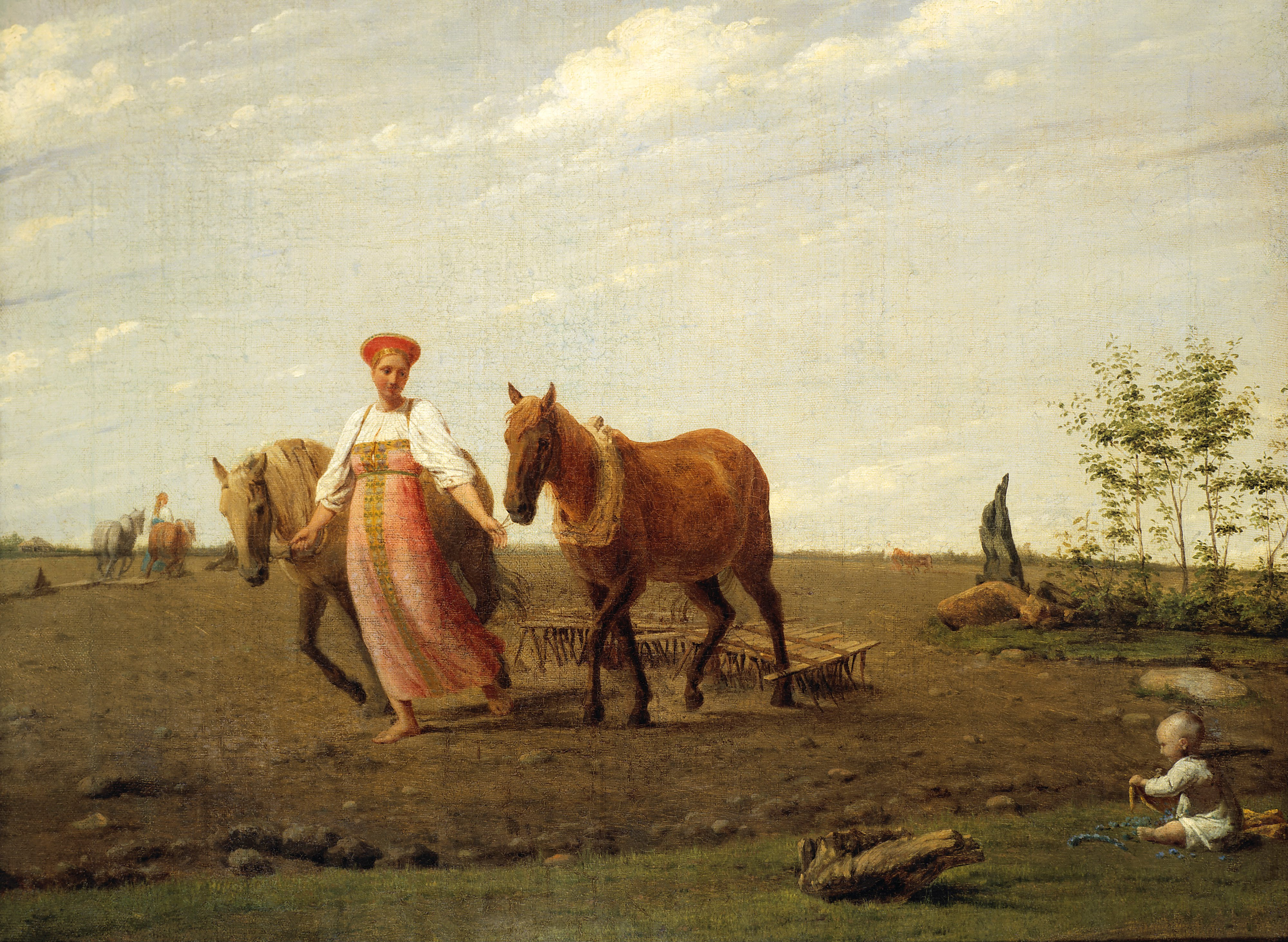
In the Ploughed Field: Spring by Alexey Venetsianov (1820)

The Last Day of Pompeii by Karl Bryullov (1833)

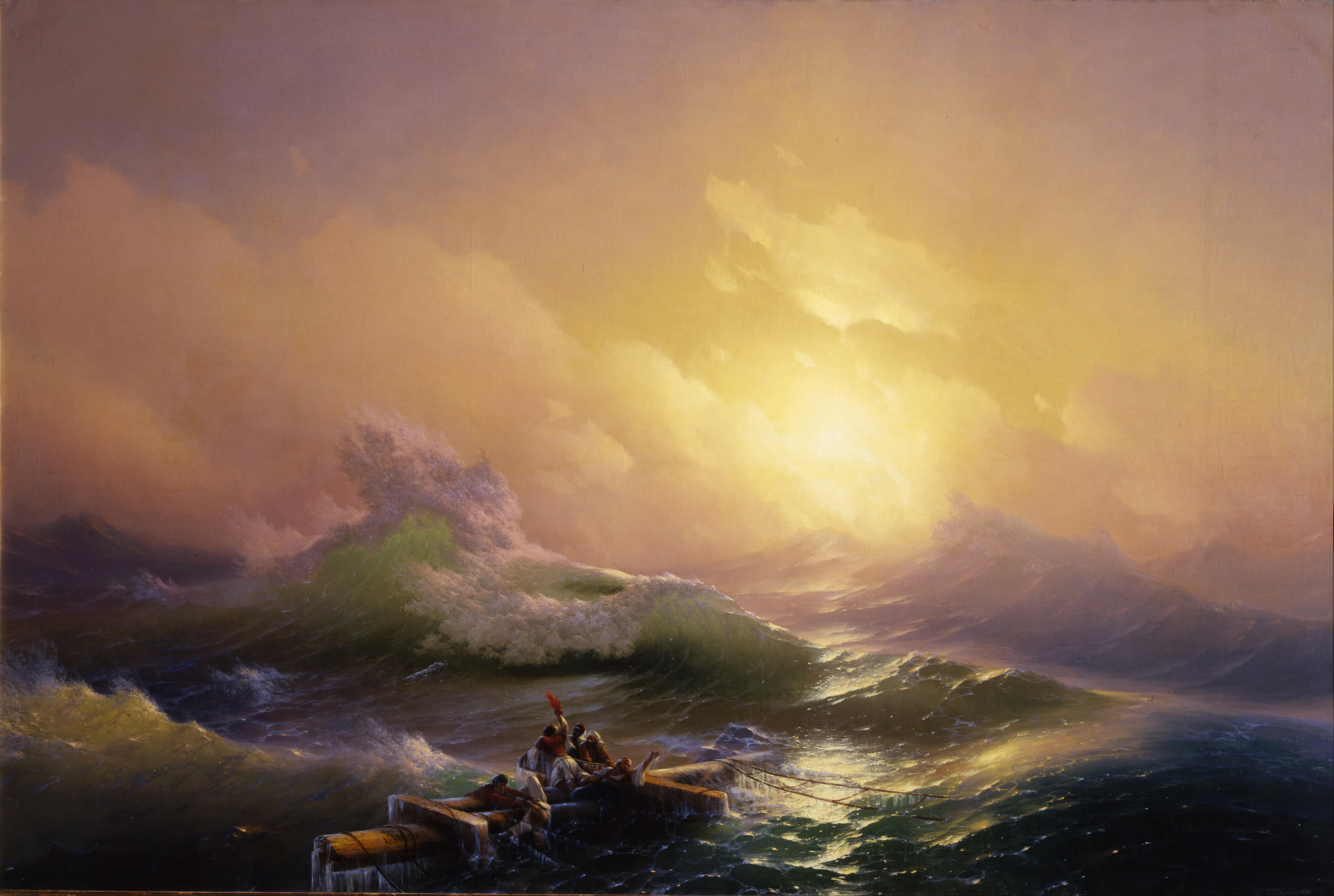
The Ninth Wave by Ivan Aivazovsky (1850)

The Appearance of Christ Before the People by Alexander Ivanov (1857)

=== Realist and Modernist painting ===
Realism came into dominance in the 19th century. The realists captured Russian identity in landscapes of wide rivers, forests, and birch clearings, as well as vigorous genre scenes and robust portraits of their contemporaries. Other artists focused on social criticism, showing the conditions of the poor and caricaturing authority; critical realism flourished under the reign of Alexander II, with some artists making the circle of human suffering their main theme. Others focused on depicting dramatic moments in Russian history. The Peredvizhniki (wanderers) group of artists broke with Russian Academy and initiated a school of art liberated from Academic restrictions. Leading realists include Ivan Shishkin, Arkhip Kuindzhi, Ivan Kramskoi, Vasily Polenov, Isaac Levitan, Vasily Surikov, Viktor Vasnetsov and Ilya Repin.

By the turn of the 20th century and on, many Russian artists developed their own unique styles, neither realist nor avant-garde. These include Boris Kustodiev, Kuzma Petrov-Vodkin, Mikhail Vrubel and Nicholas Roerich. Many works by the Peredvizhniki group of artists have been highly sought after by collectors in recent years. Russian art auctions during Russian Art Week in London have increased in demand and works have been sold for record breaking prices.

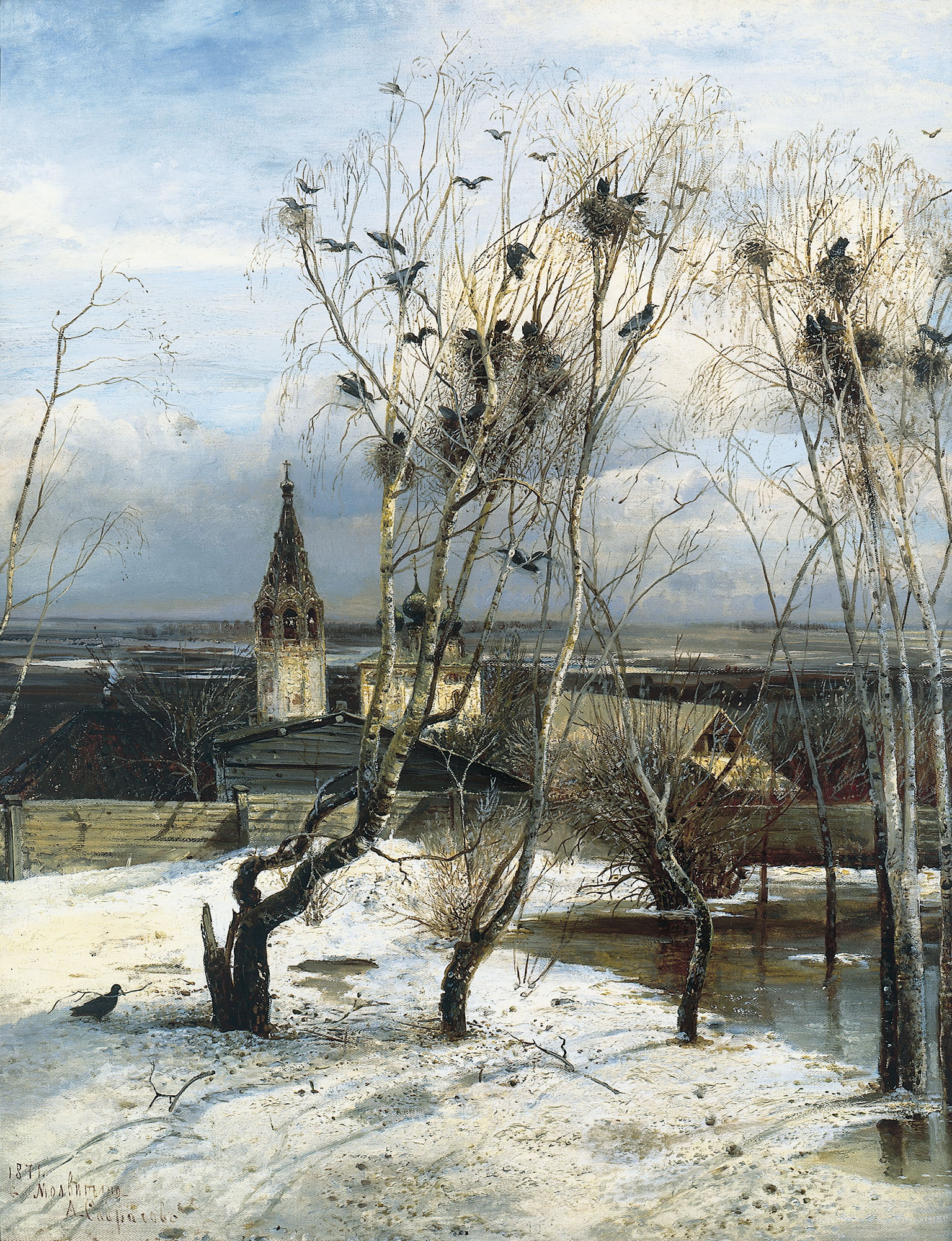
The Rooks Have Returned by Alexei Savrasov (1871)

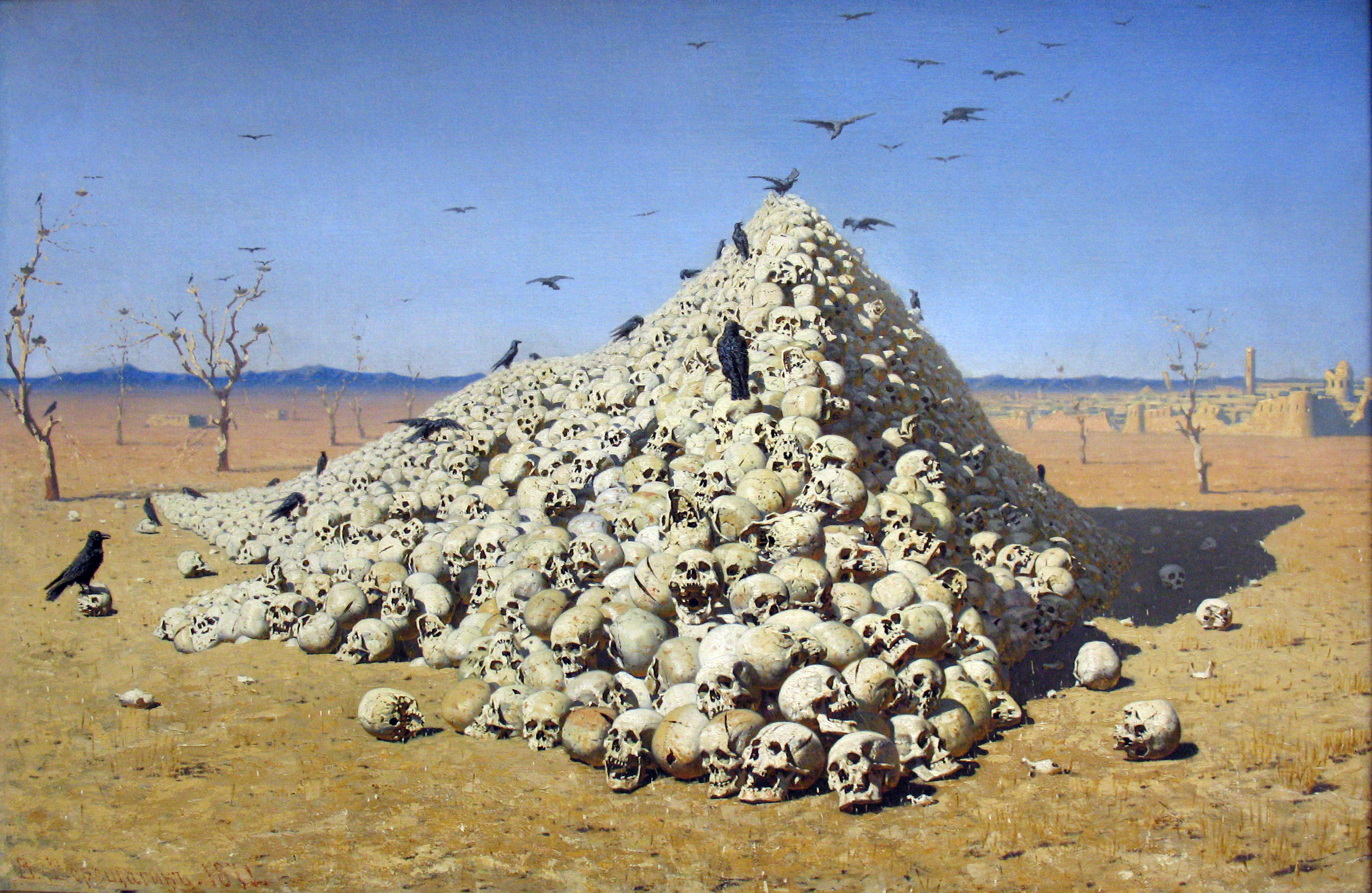
The Apotheosis of War by Vasily Vereshchagin (1871)

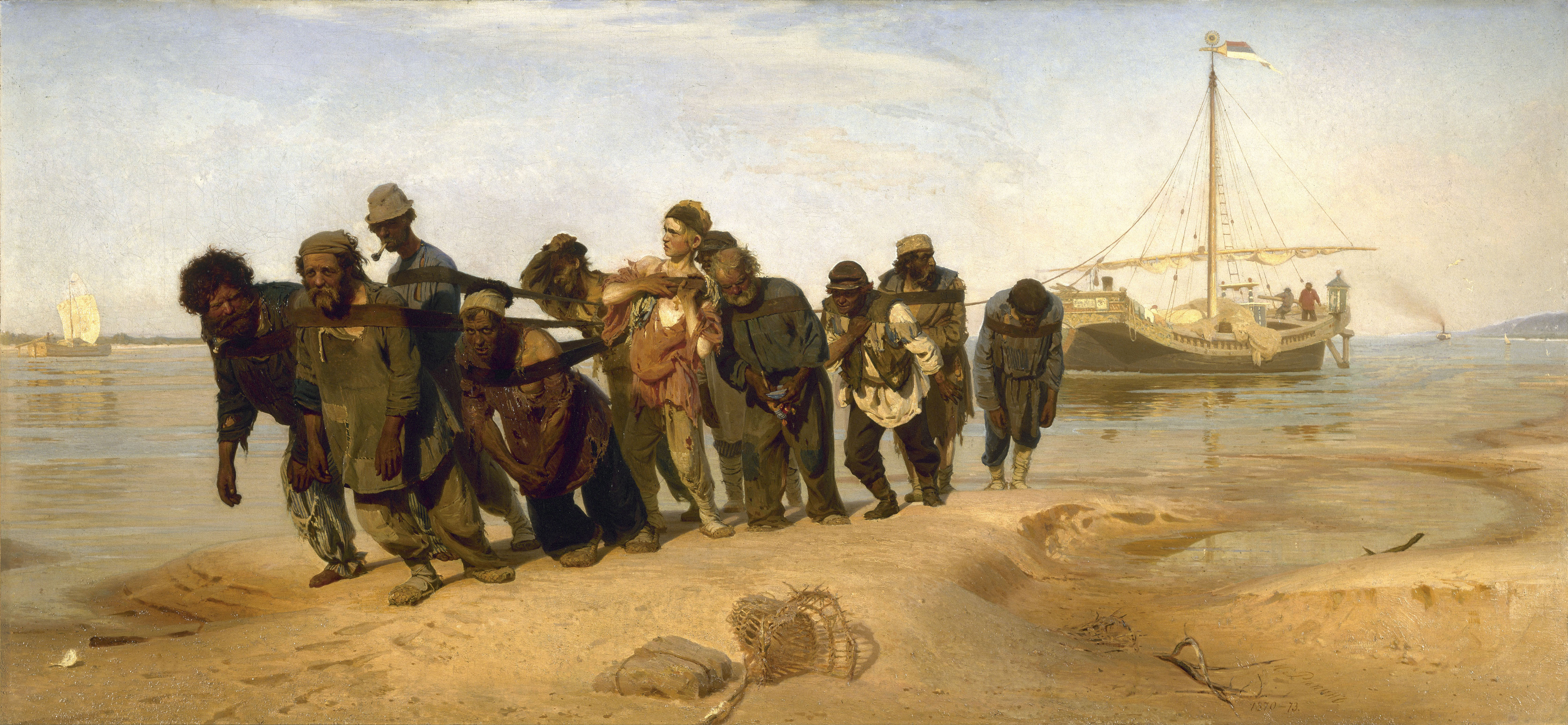
Barge Haulers on the Volga by Ilya Repin (1873)

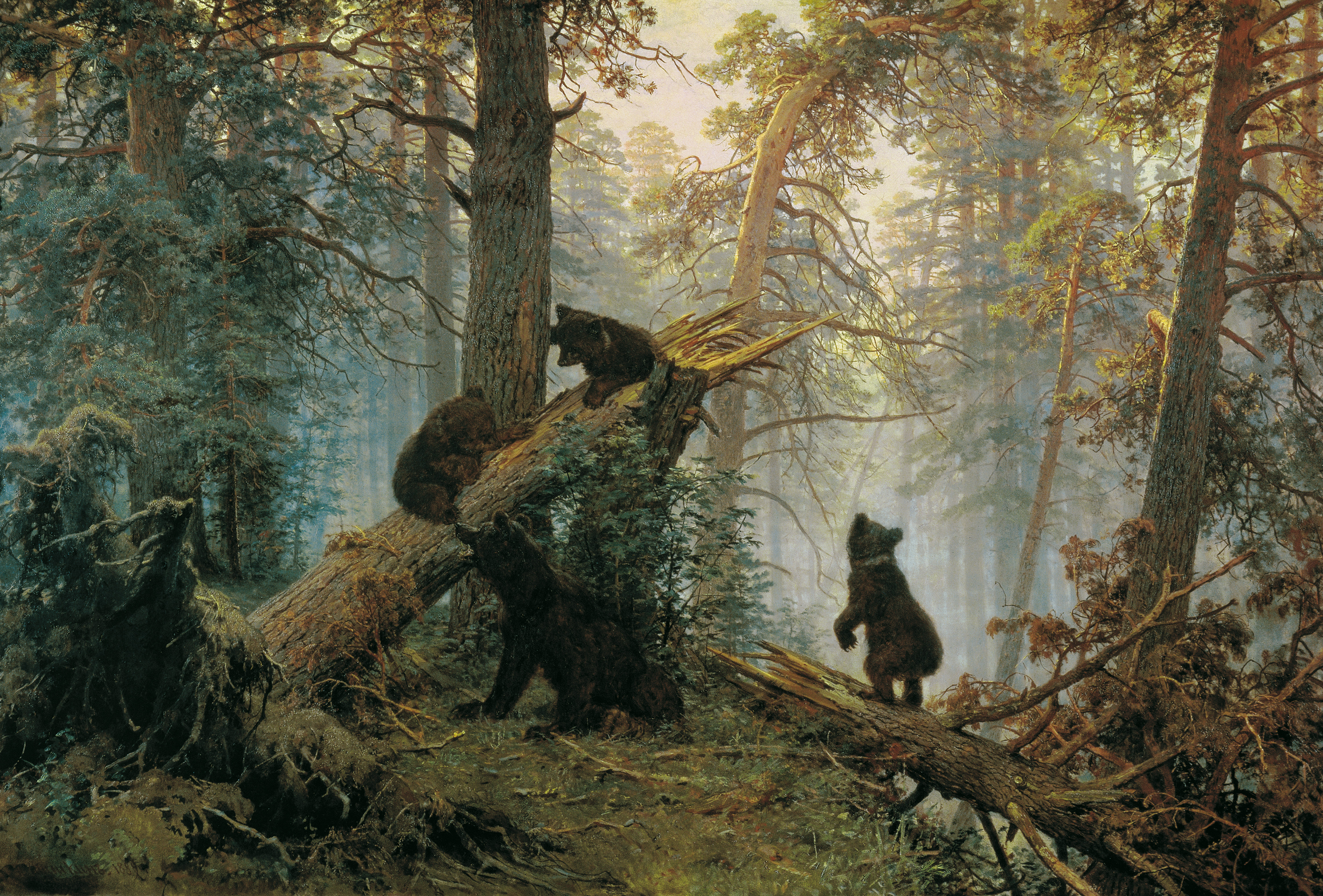
Morning in a Pine Forest by Ivan Shishkin and Konstantin Savitsky (1878)

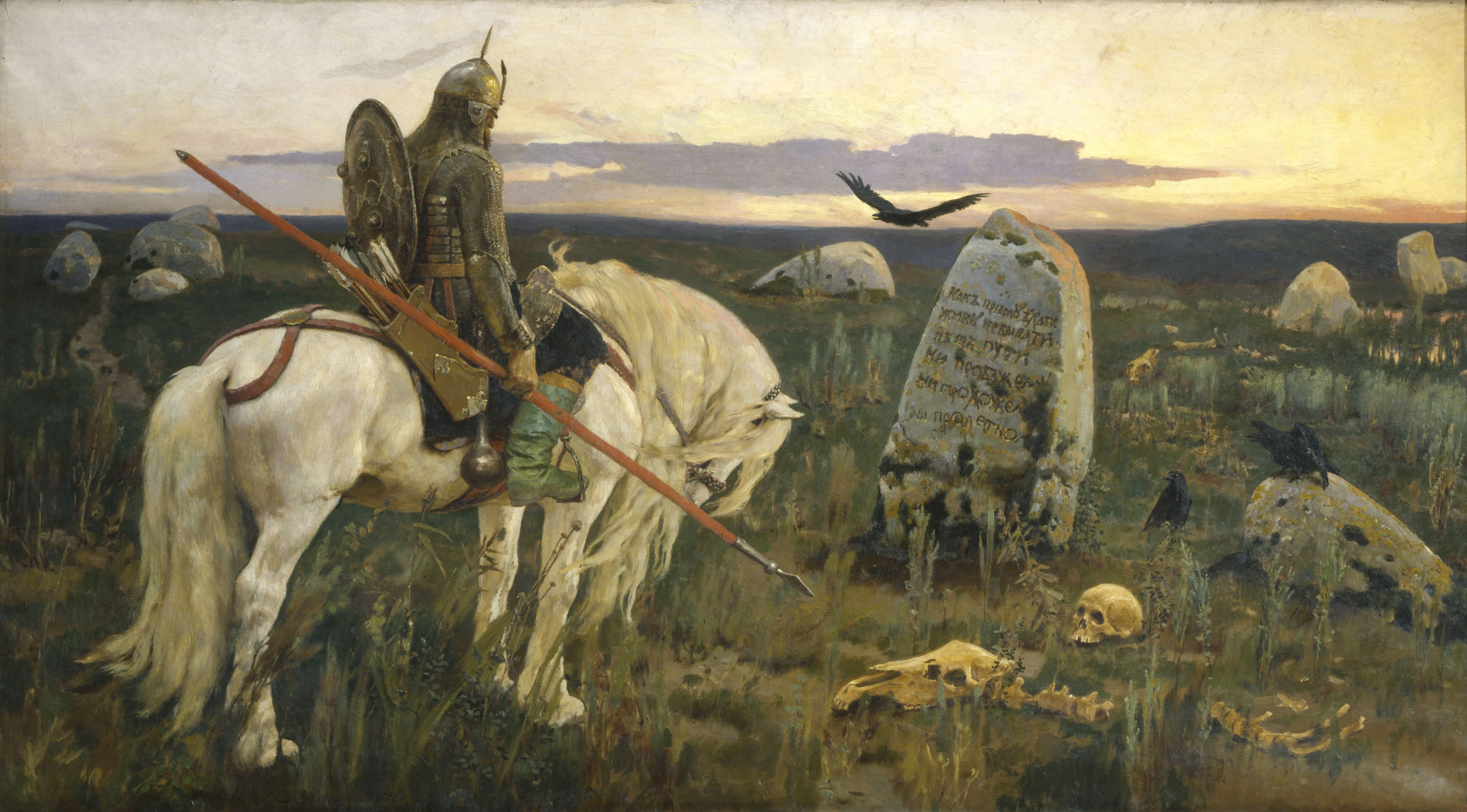
Knight at the Crossroads by Viktor Vasnetsov (1878)

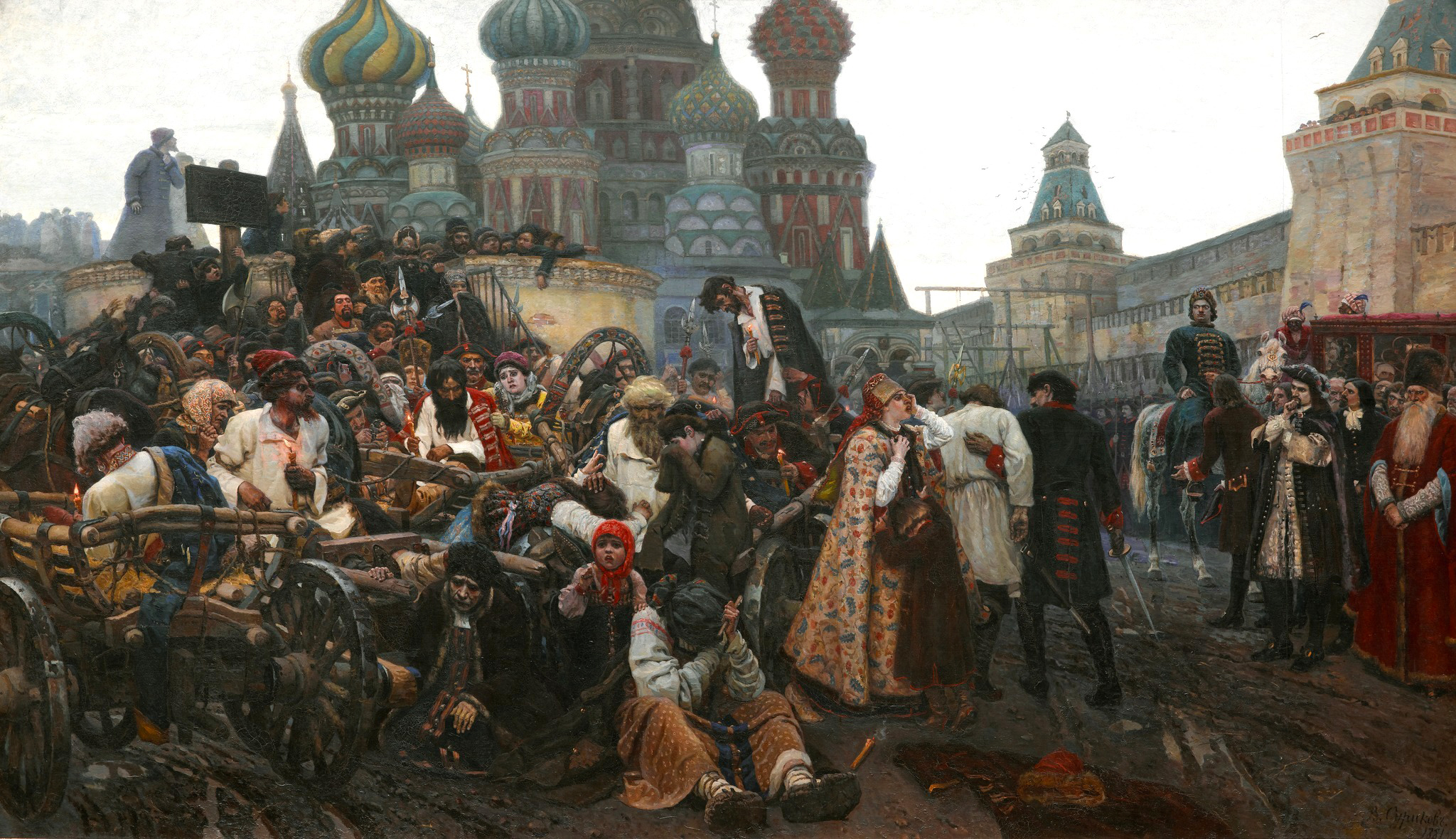
The Morning of the Streltsy Execution by Vasily Surikov (1881)

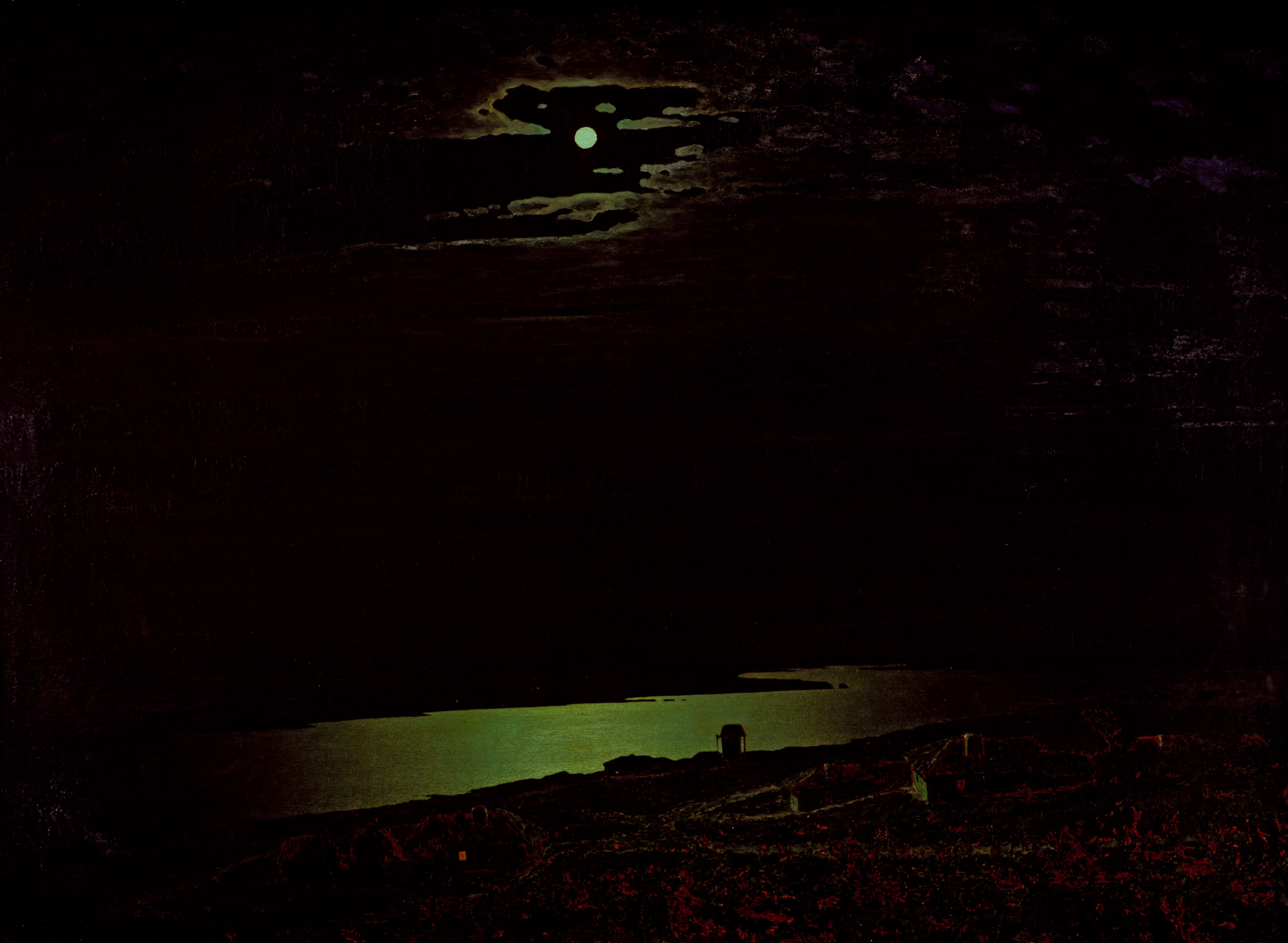
Moonlit Night on the Dnieper by Arkhip Kuindzhi (1882)

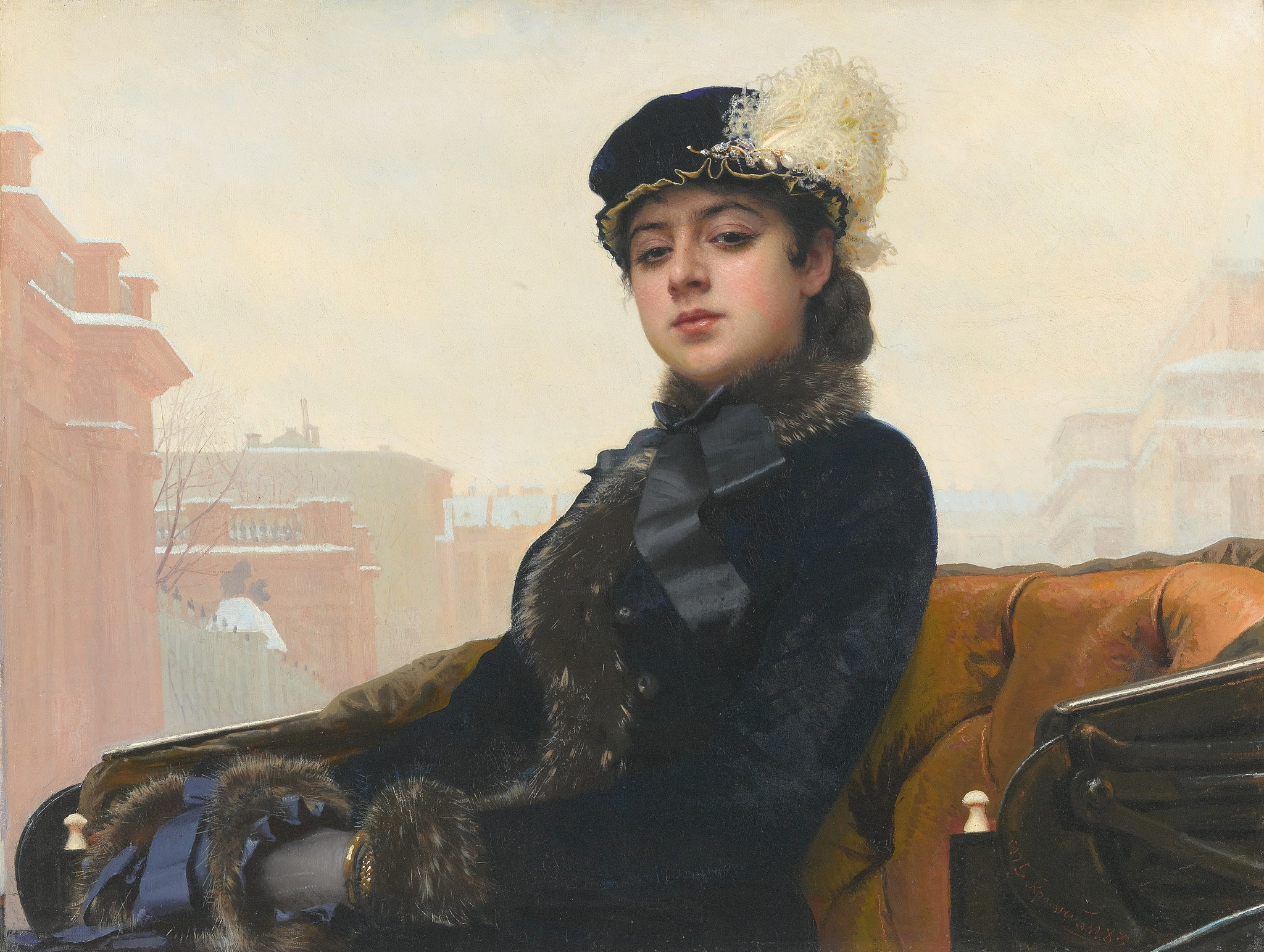
Portrait of an Unknown Woman by Ivan Kramskoi (1883)

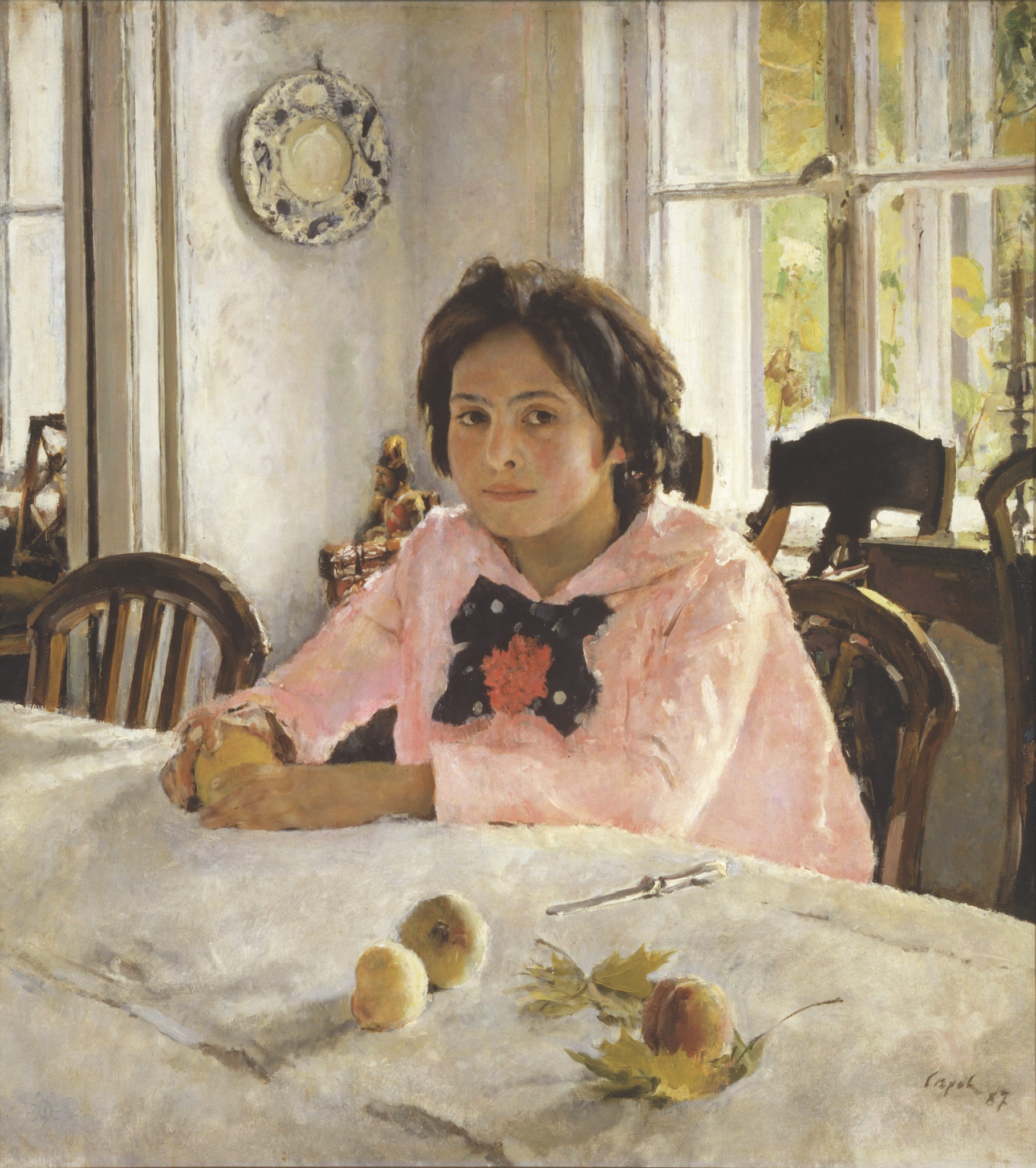
Girl with Peaches by Valentin Serov (1887)

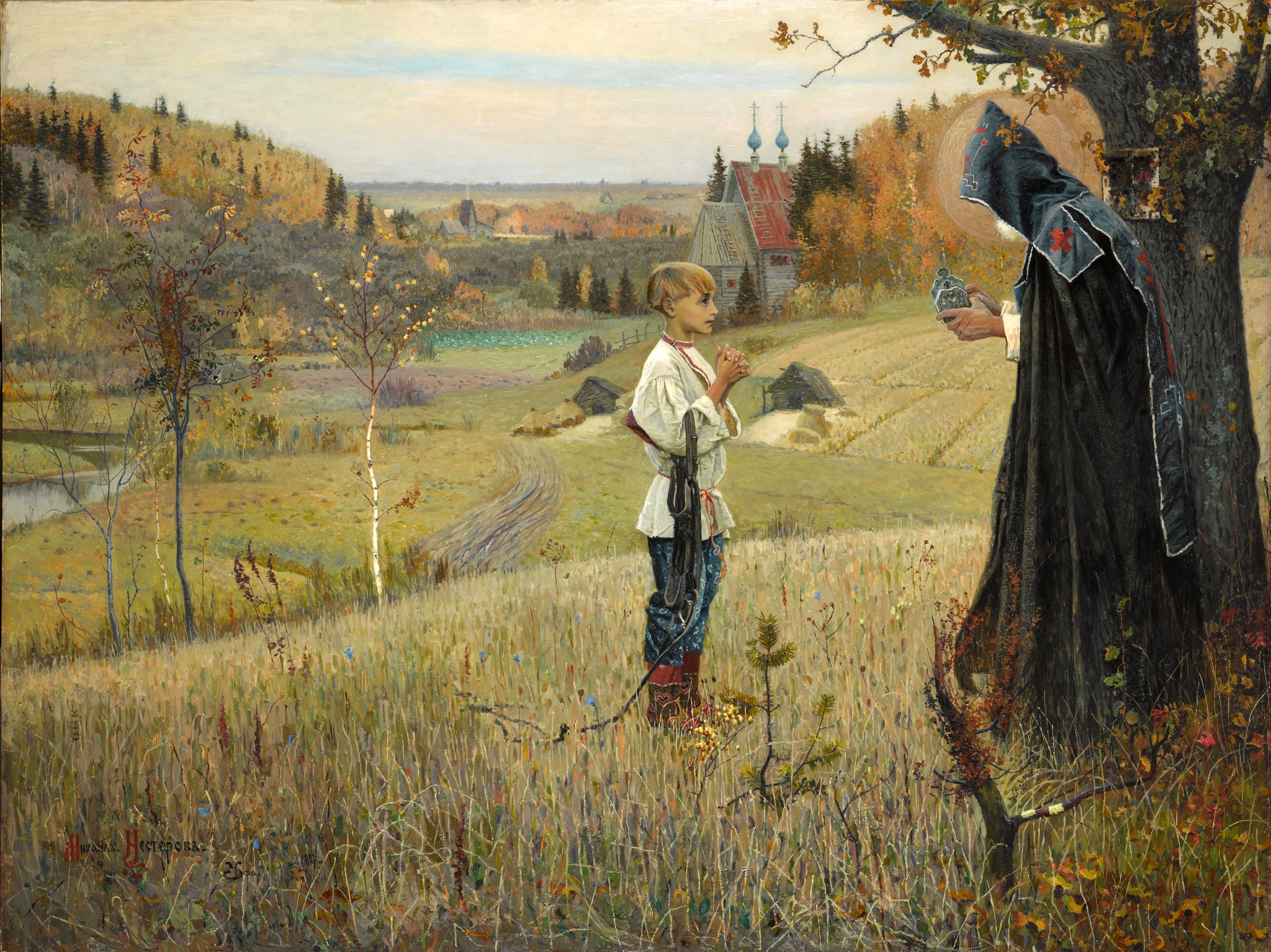
The Vision to the Youth Bartholomew by Mikhail Nesterov (1890)

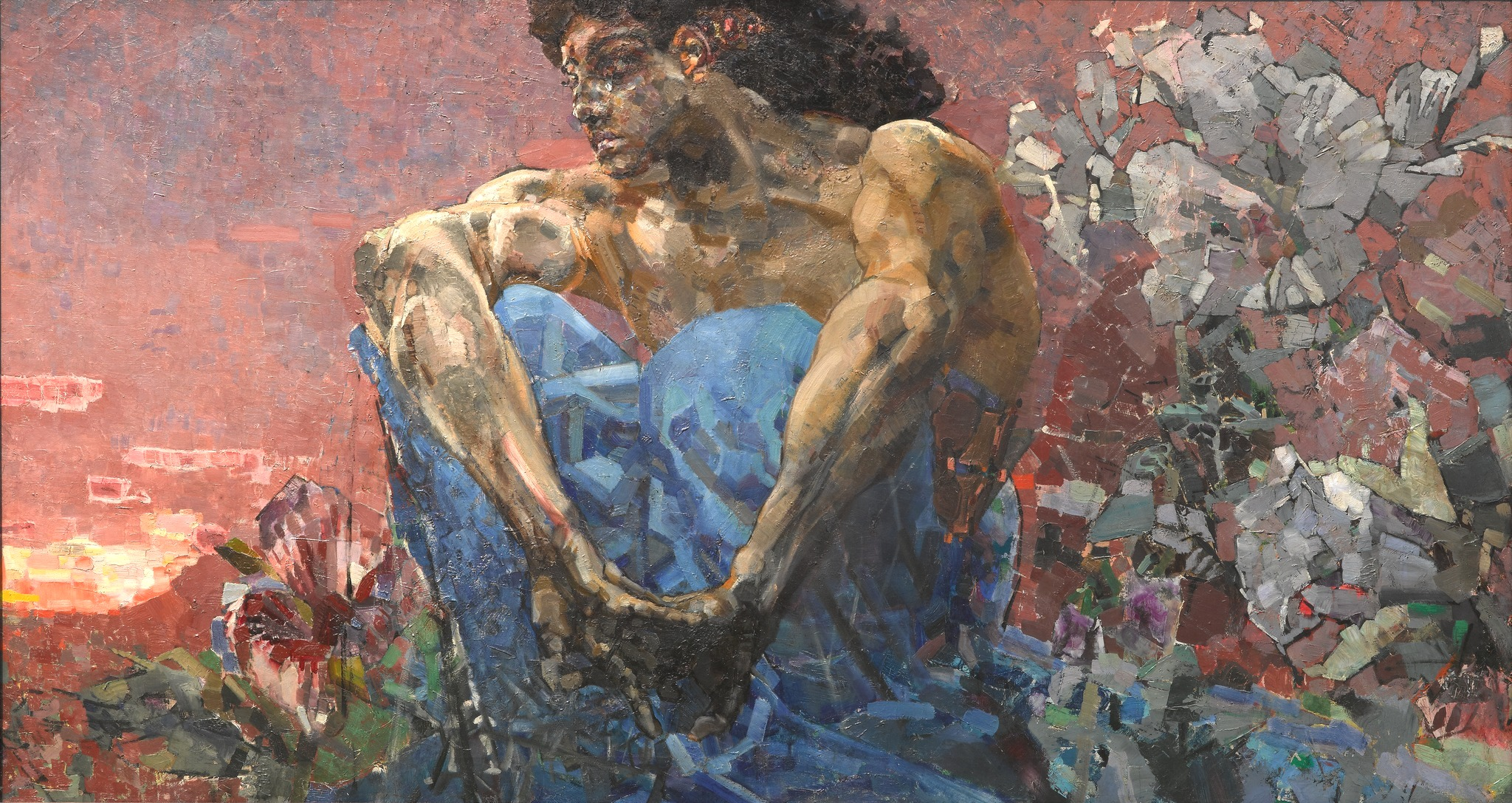
The Demon Seated by Mikhail Vrubel (1891)

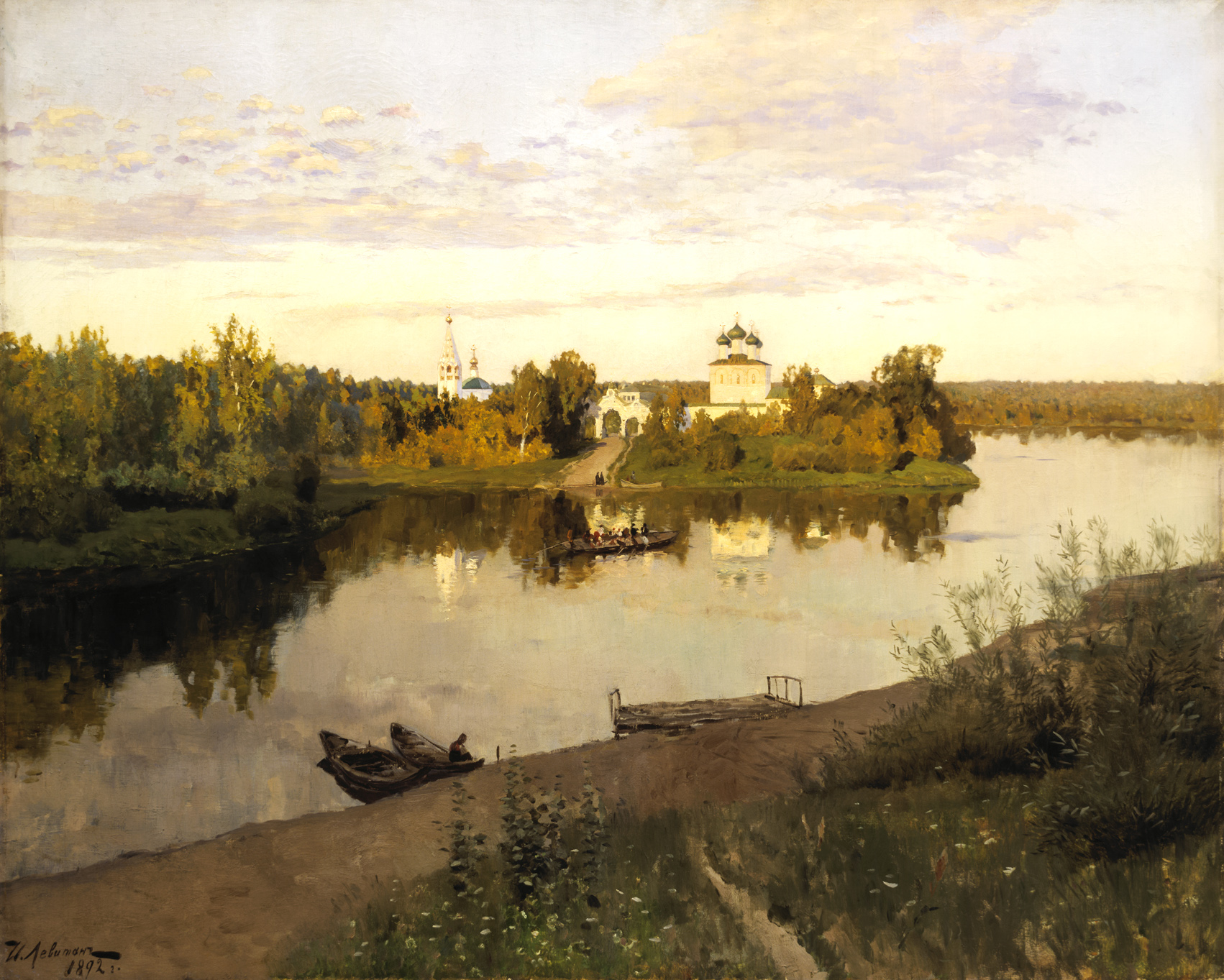
The Evening Bells by Isaac Levitan (1892)

=== Russian avant-garde ===
The Russian avant-garde is an umbrella term used to define the large, influential wave of modernist art that flourished in Russia from approximately 1890 to 1930. The term covers many separate, but inextricably related, art movements that occurred at the time; namely neo-primitivism, suprematism, constructivism, rayonism, and futurism. Notable artists from this era include El Lissitzky, Kazimir Malevich, Wassily Kandinsky, Vladimir Tatlin, Alexander Rodchenko, Pavel Filonov and Marc Chagall. The Russian avant-garde reached its creative and popular height in the period between the Russian Revolution of 1917 and 1932, at which point the revolutionary ideas of the avant-garde clashed with the newly emerged conservative direction of socialist realism.

In the 20th century many Russian artists made their careers in Western Europe, forced to emigrate by the Revolution. Wassily Kandinsky, Marc Chagall, Naum Gabo and others spread their work, ideas, and the impact of Russian art globally.

I and the Village by Marc Chagall (1911)

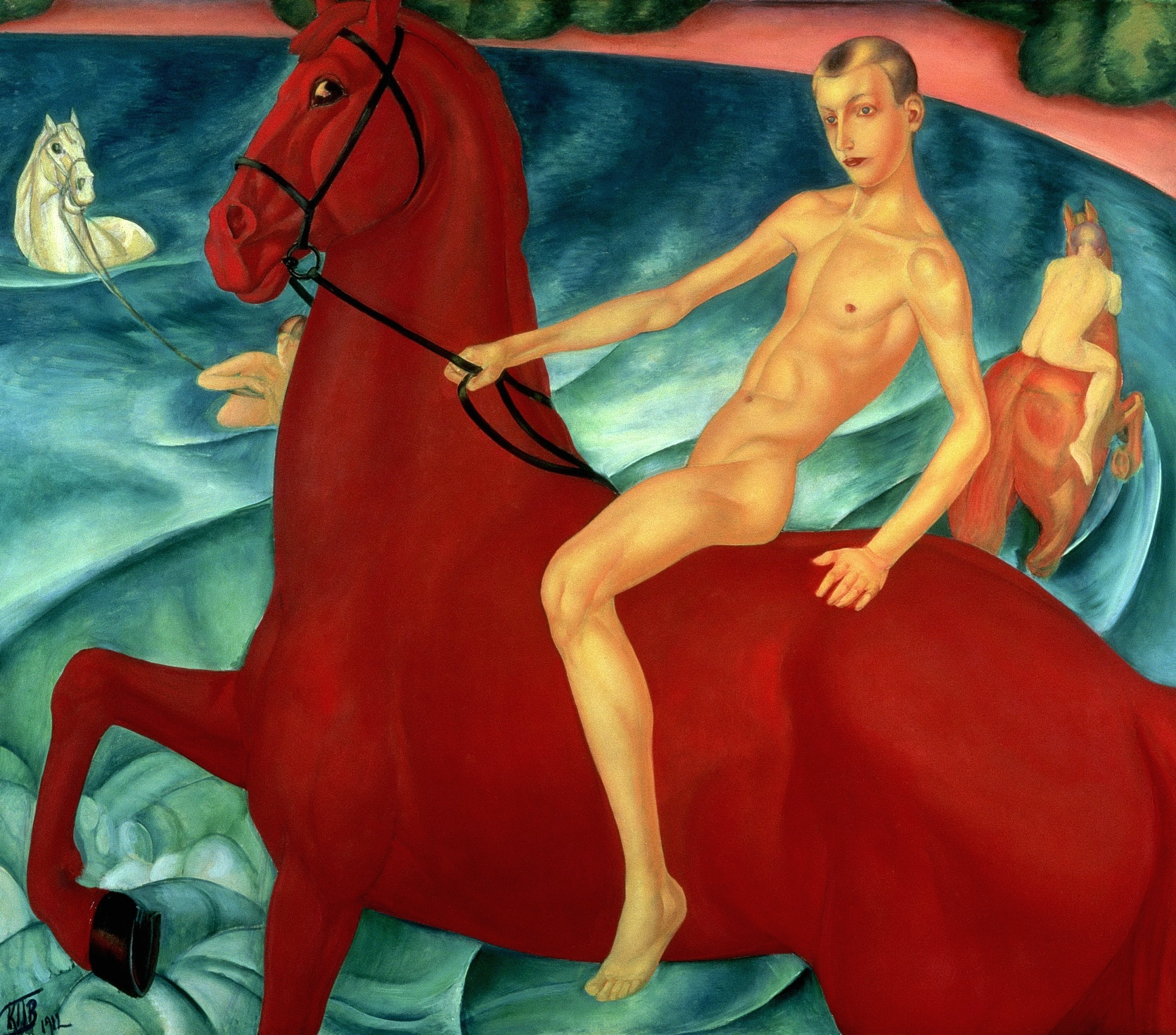
Bathing of a Red Horse by Kuzma Petrov-Vodkin (1912)

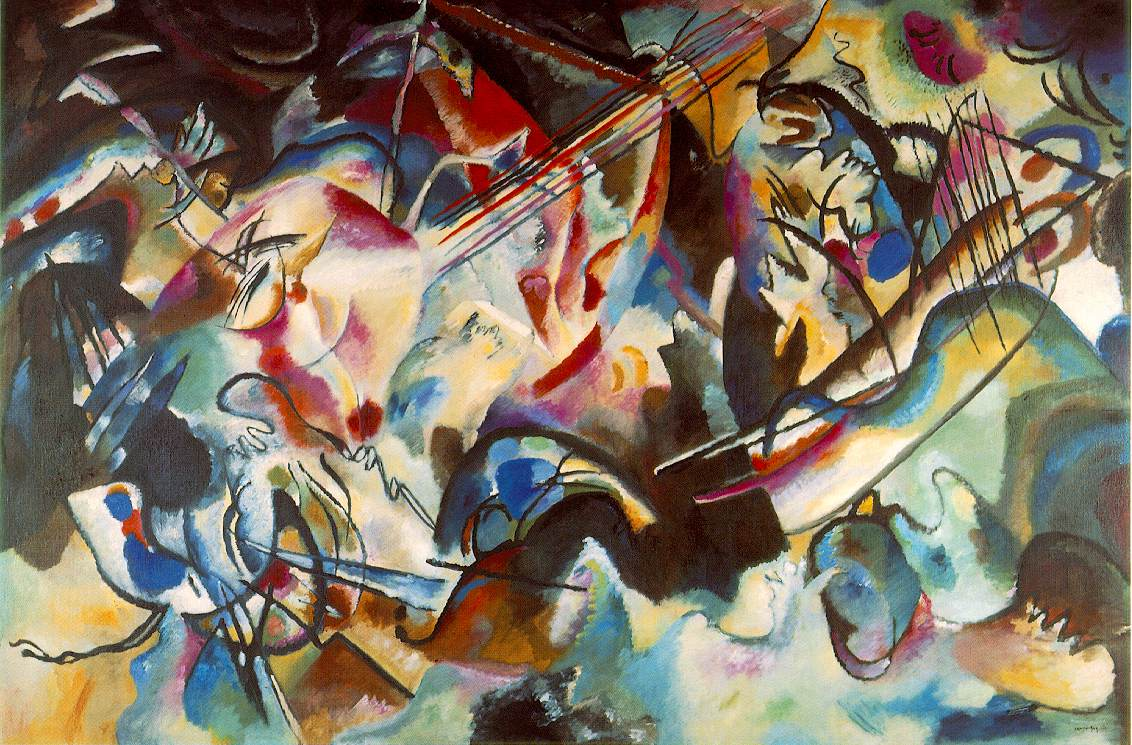
Composition VI by Vasily Kandinsky (1913)

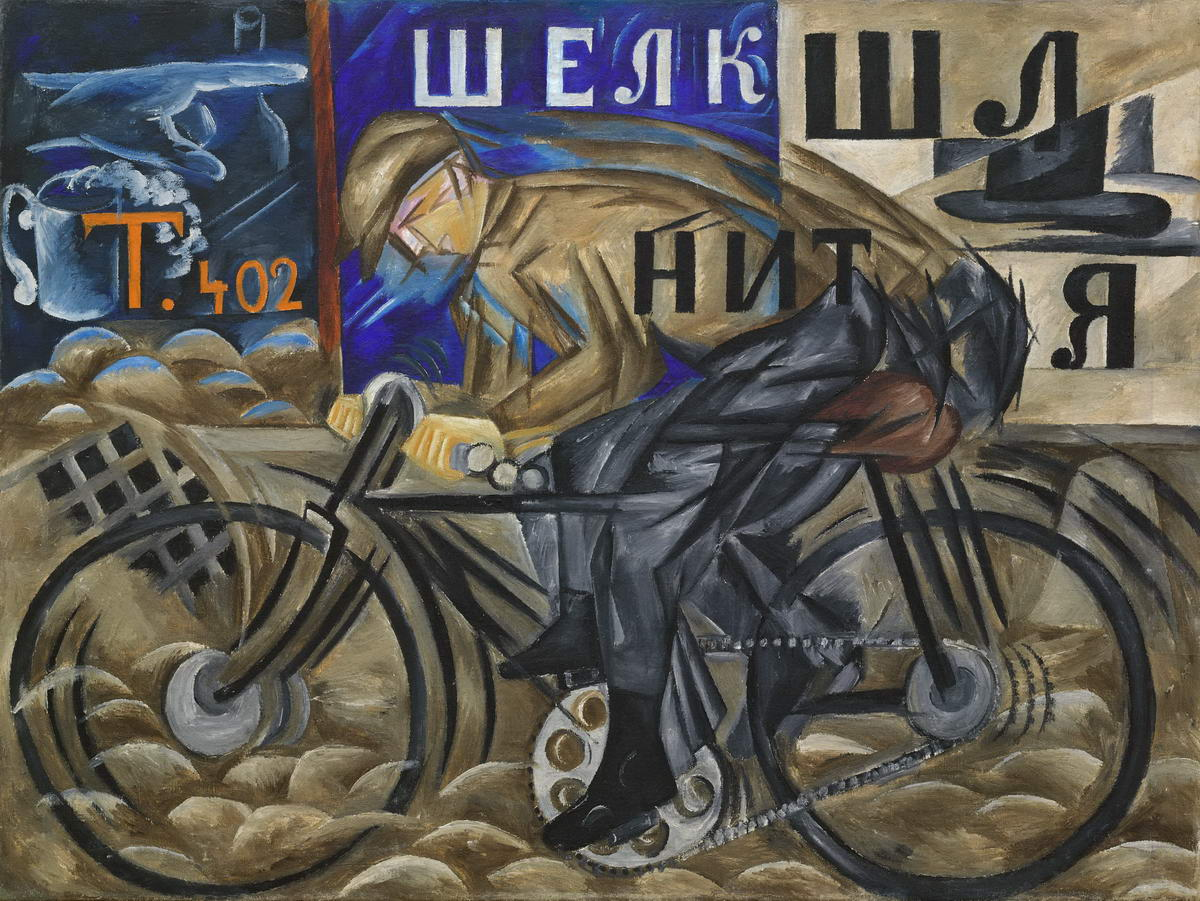
Cyclist by Natalia Goncharova (1913)

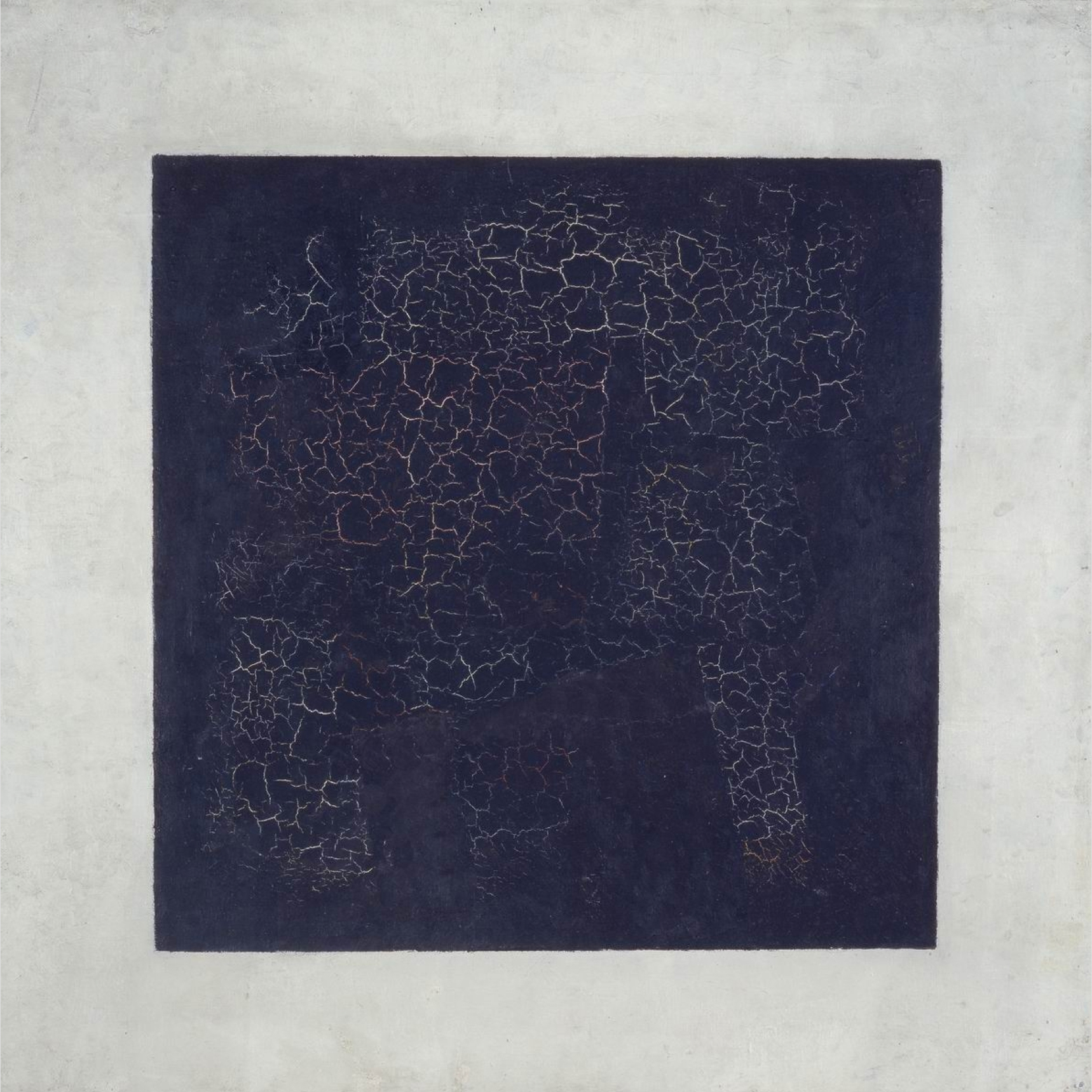
Black Square by Kazimir Malevich (1915)

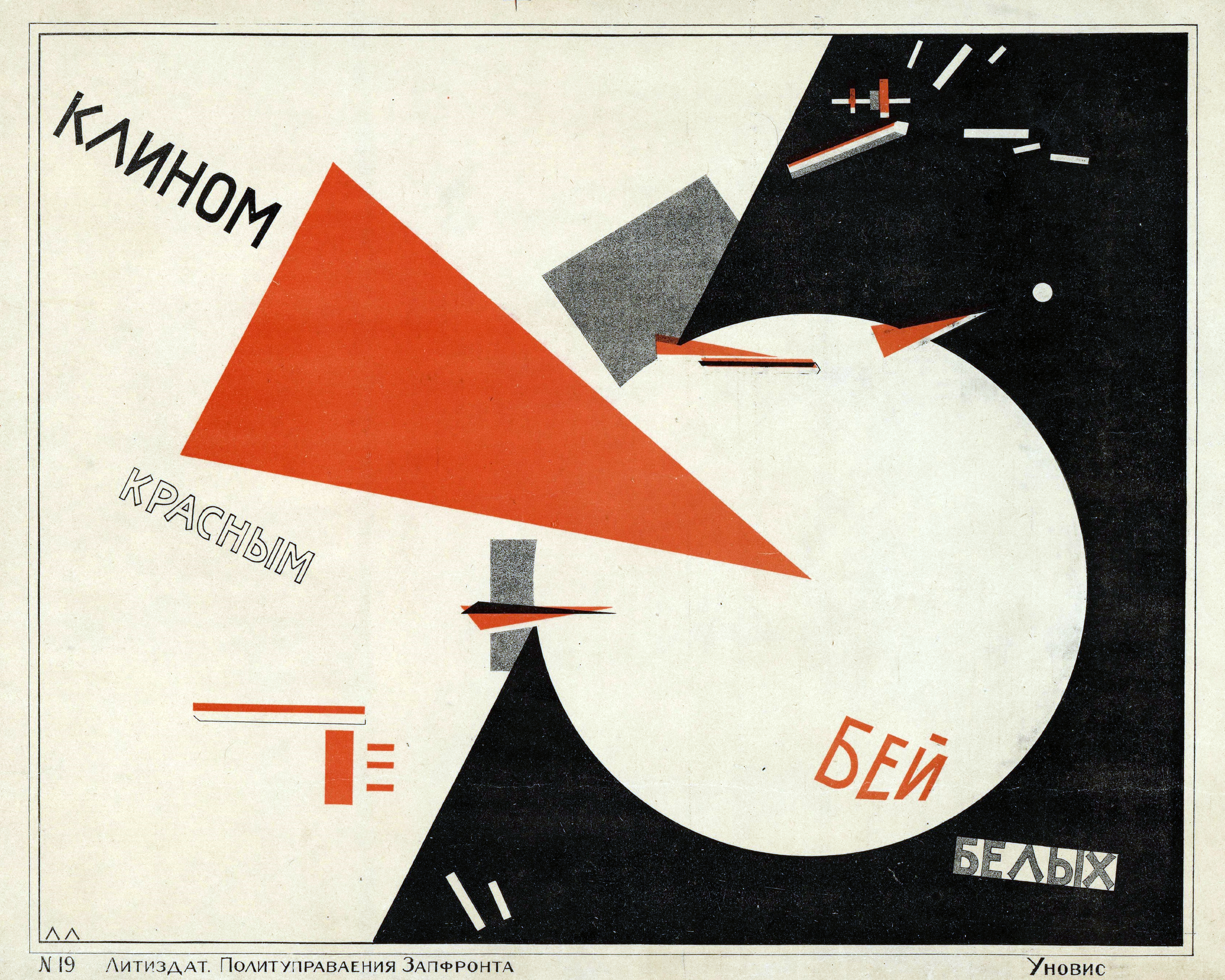
Beat the Whites with the Red Wedge by El Lissitzky (1919)

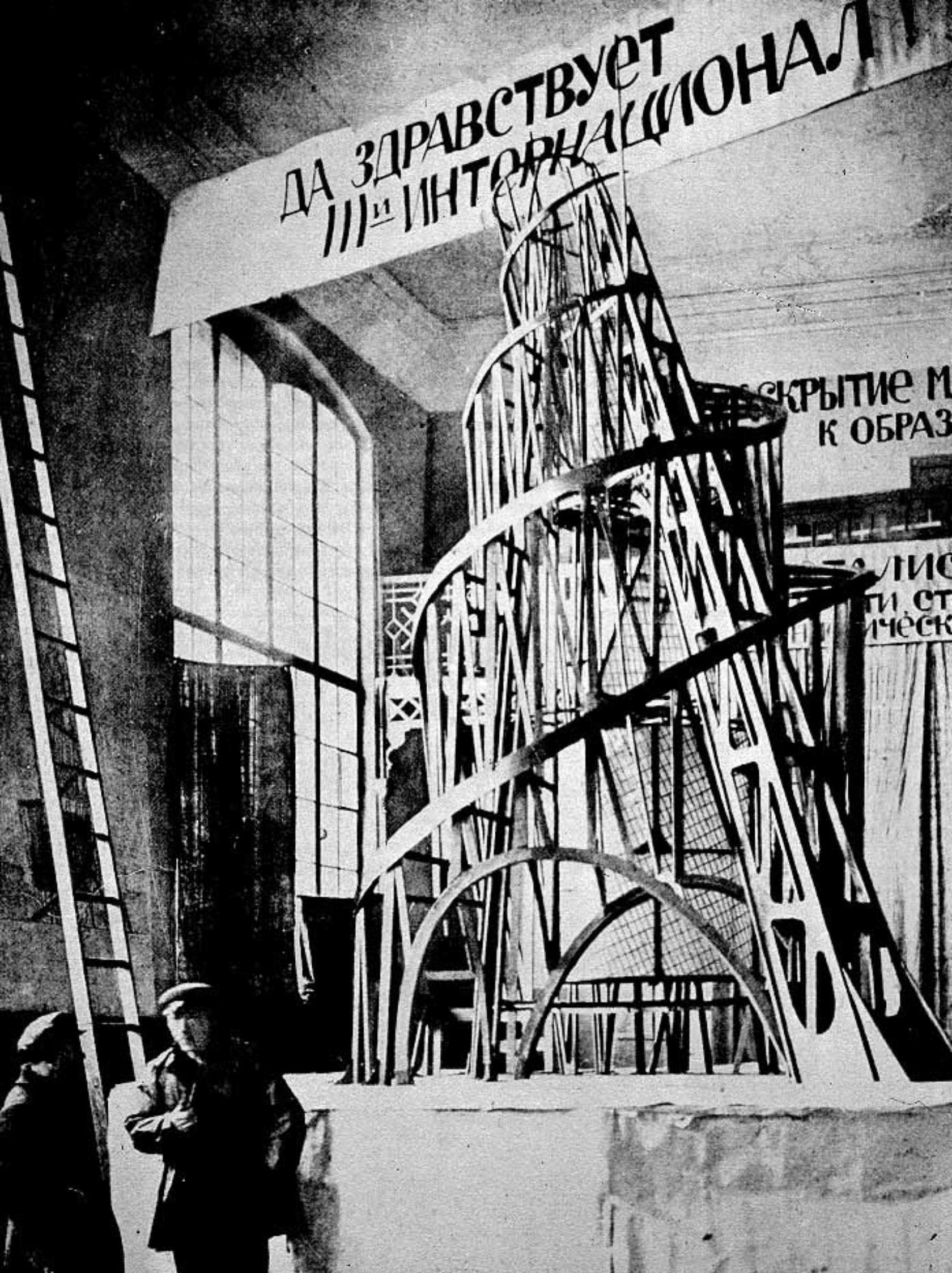
Tatlin's Tower by Vladimir Tatlin (1920)

Books in All Branches of Knowledge poster by Alexander Rodchenko

=== Soviet art ===
The Motherland Calls statue, designed by Yevgeny Vuchetich and Nikolai Nikitin.

During the Russian Revolution a movement was initiated to put all arts to service of the dictatorship of the proletariat. The instrument for this was created just days before the October Revolution, known as Proletkult, an abbreviation for "Proletarskie kulturno-prosvetitelnye organizatsii" (Proletarian Cultural and Enlightenment Organizations). A prominent theorist of this movement was Alexander Bogdanov. Initially, Narkompros (ministry of education), which was also in charge of the arts, supported Proletkult. Although Marxist in character, the Proletkult gained the disfavor of many party leaders, and by 1922 it had declined considerably. It was eventually disbanded by Stalin in 1932. De facto restrictions on what artists could paint were abandoned by the late 1980s.

However, in the late Soviet era many artists combined innovation with socialist realism including Ernst Neizvestny, Ilya Kabakov, Mikhail Shemyakin, Igor Novikov, Erik Bulatov, and Vera Mukhina. They employed techniques as varied as primitivism, hyperrealism, grotesque, and abstraction. Soviet artists produced works that were furiously patriotic and anti-fascist in the 1940s. After the Great Patriotic War Soviet sculptors made multiple monuments to the war dead, marked by a great restrained solemnity.

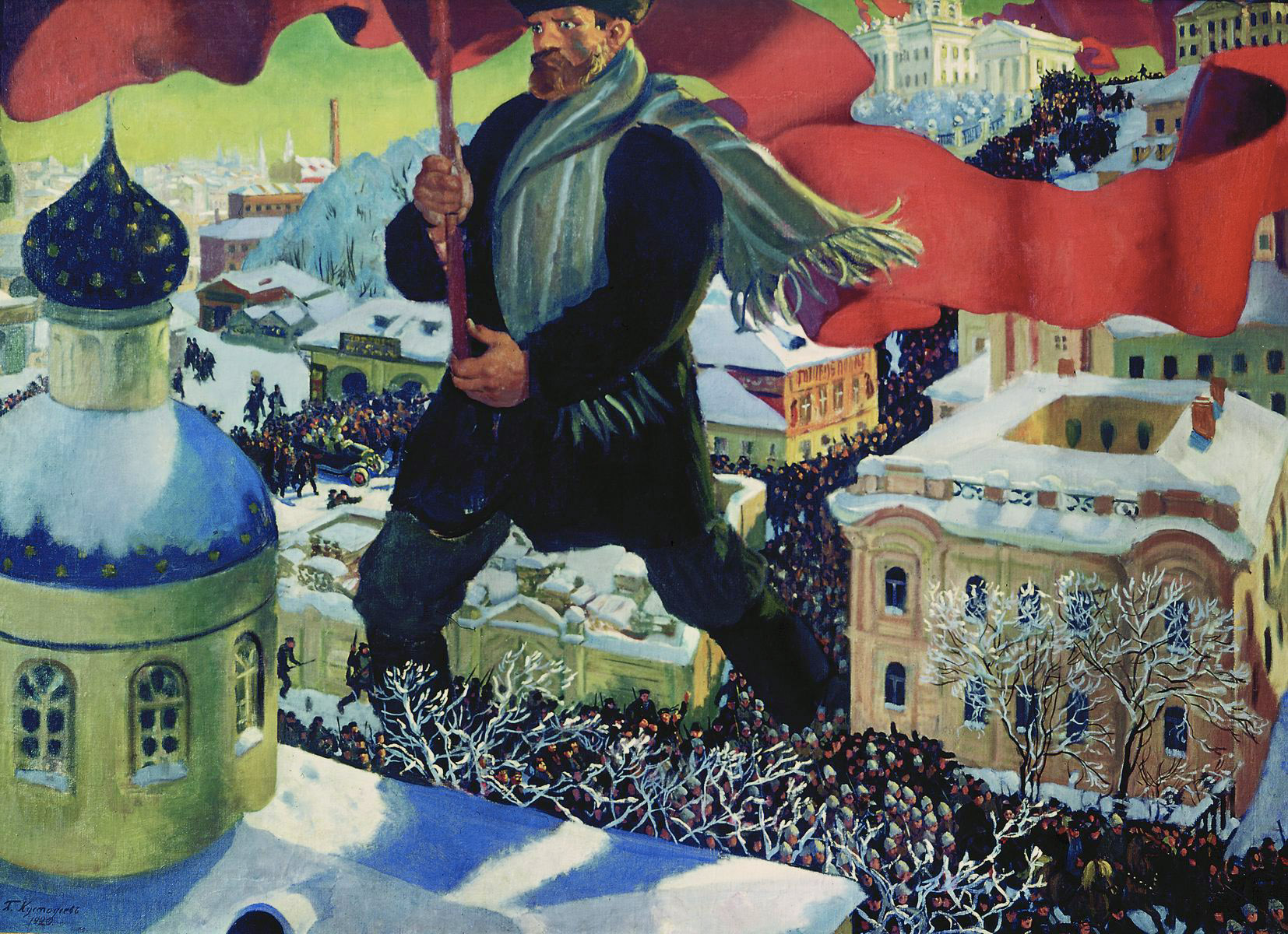
The Bolshevik by Boris Kustodiev (1920)

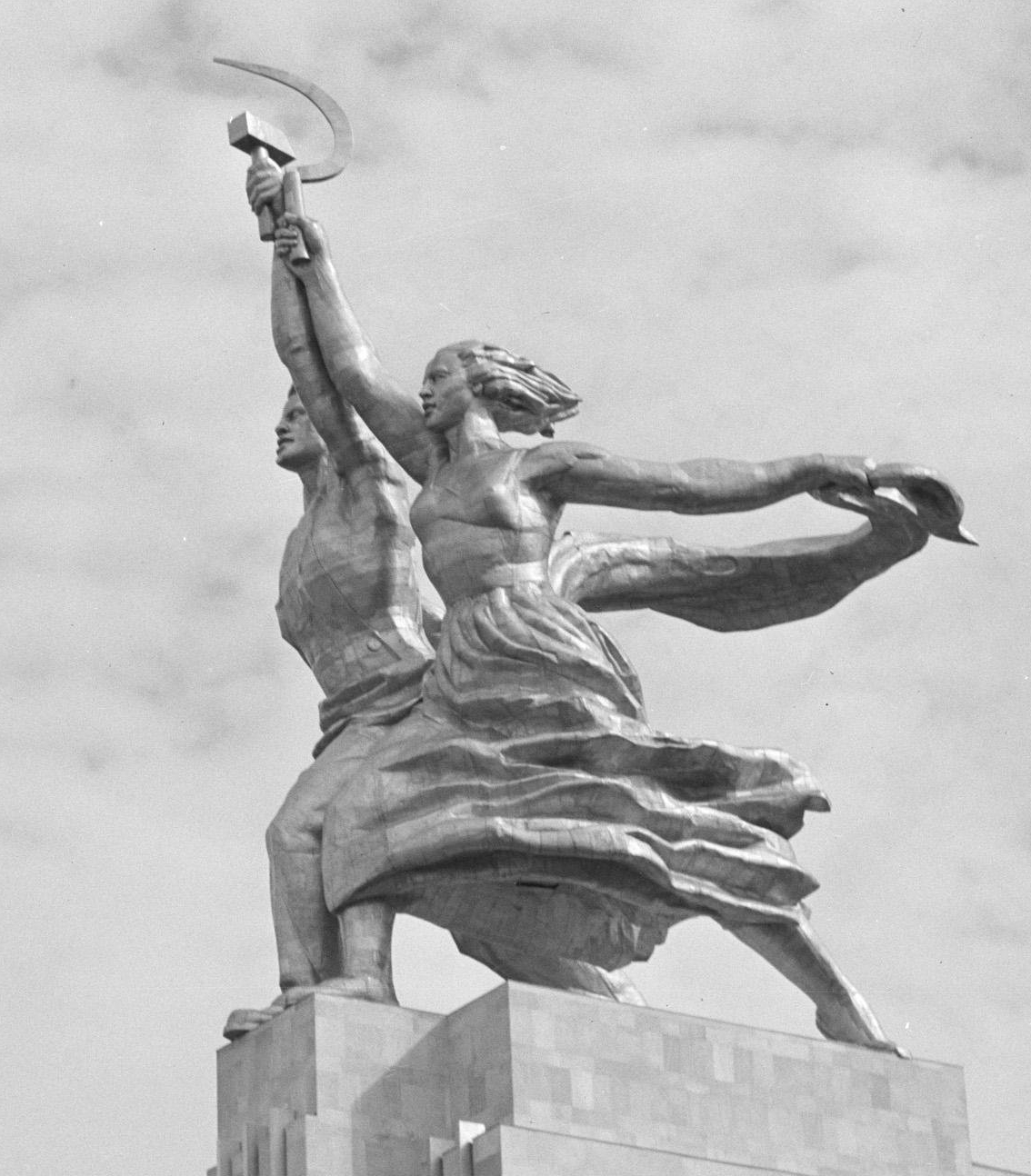
Worker and Kolkhoz Woman by Vera Mukhina (1937)

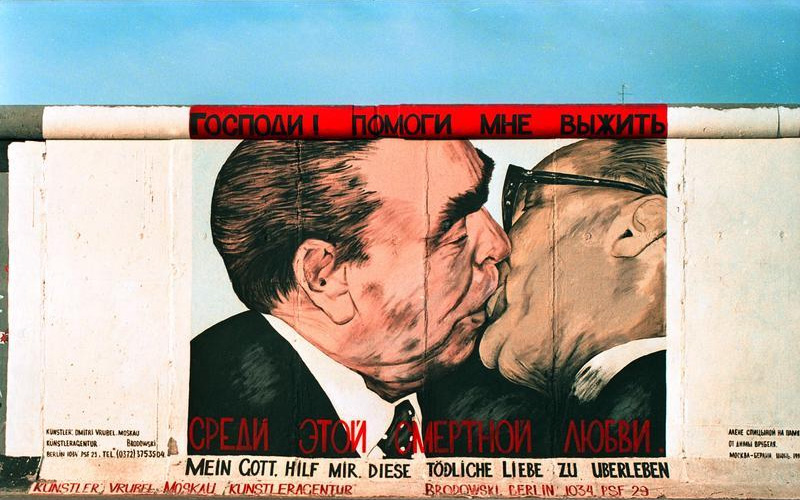
My God, Help Me to Survive This Deadly Love by Dmitri Vrubel (1990)

== Performance arts ==
=== Russian folk music ===
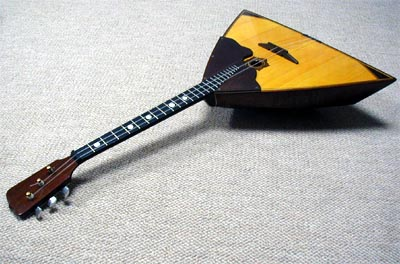
A balalaika

Russians have distinctive traditions of folk music. Typical ethnic Russian musical instruments are gusli, balalaika, zhaleika, balalaika contrabass, bayan accordion, Gypsy guitar and garmoshka. Folk music had great influence on the Russian classical composers, and in modern times it is a source of inspiration for a number of popular folk bands, most prominent being Golden Ring, Ural's Nation Choir, Lyudmila Zykina. Russian folk songs, as well as patriotic songs of the Soviet era, constitute the bulk of repertoire of the world-renowned Red Army choir and other popular Russian ensembles.

=== Russian folk dance ===
Russian folk dance (Russian: Русский Народный Танец) can generally be broken up into two main types of dances. Khorovod (Russian: Хоровод), a circular game type dance where the participants hold hands, sing, and the action generally happens in the middle of circle, and Plyaska (Russian: Пляска or Плясовый), a circular dance for men and women that increases in diversity and tempo, according to Bob Renfield, considered to be the preeminent scholar on the topic. Other forms of Russian Folk Dance include Pereplyas (Russian: Перепляс), an all-male competitive dance, Mass Dance (Russian: Массовый пляс), an unpaired stage dance without restrictions on age or number of participants, Group Dance (Russian: Групповая пляска) a type of mass dance employs simple round-dance passages, and improvisation, and types of Quadrilles (Russian: Кадриль), originally a French dance brought to Russia in the 18th century.

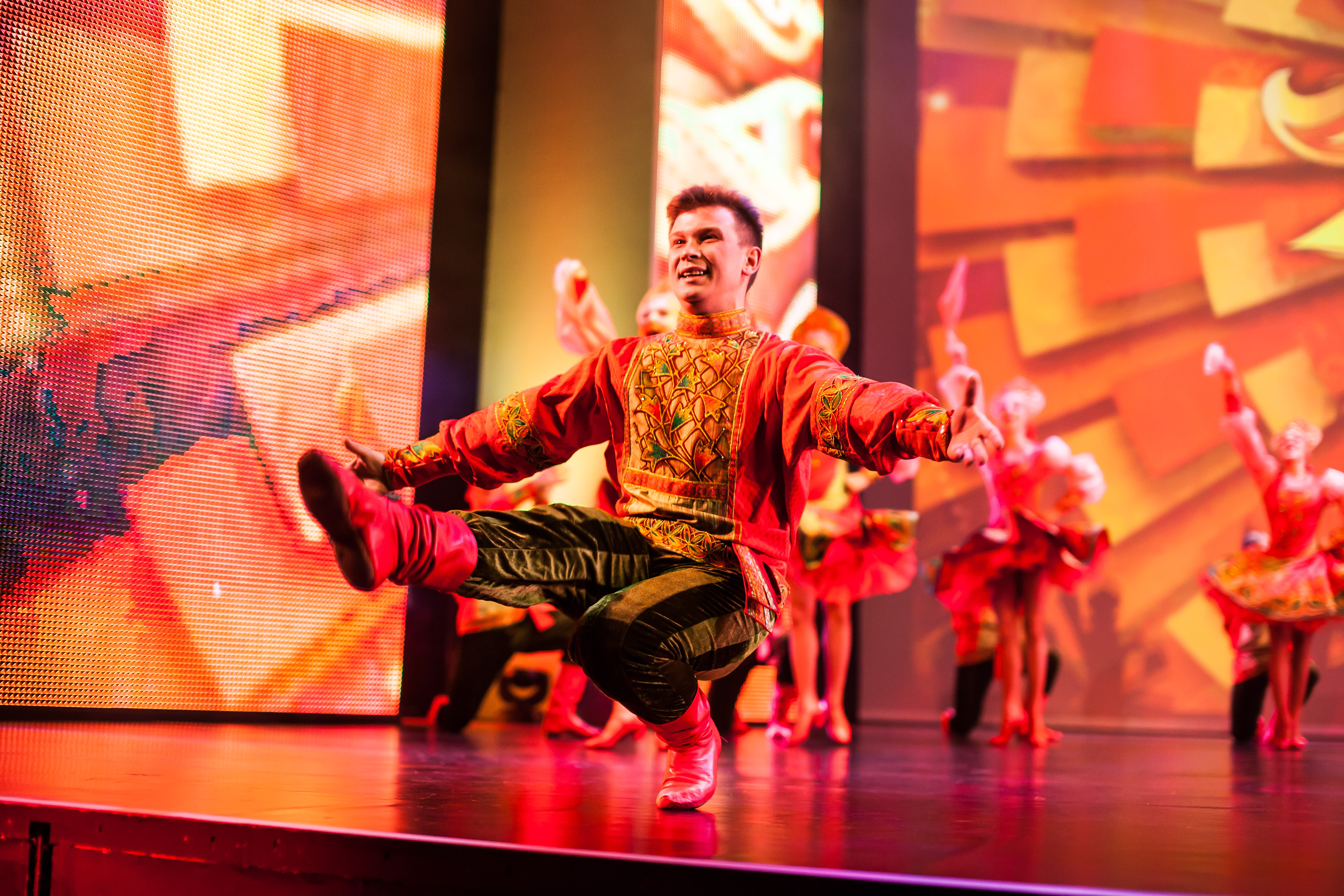
Russian dancer dansing vprisiadku

Ethnic Russian dances include khorovod (Russian: Хоровод), barynya (Russian: Барыня), kamarinskaya (Russian: Камаринская), kazachok (Russian: Казачок) and chechotka (Russian: Чечётка) (a tap dance in bast shoes and with a bayan). Troika (Russian: Тройка) A dance with one man and two women, named after the traditional Russian carriage which is led by three horses. Bear Dance or dancing with bears (Russian: Танец С Медведем) Dates back to 907 when Great Russian Prince Oleg, in celebration of his victory over the Greeks in Kiev, had as entertainment, 16 male dancers dress as bears and four bears dress as dancers. Dances with dancers dressed as bears are a recurring theme, as seen a recording of the Omsk Russian Folk Chorus. One of the main characteristics of Russian furious dances is the vprisiadku elements.

=== Classical music ===
Until the 18th century, music in Russia consisted mainly of church music and folk songs and dances. In the 19th century, it was defined by the tension between classical composer Mikhail Glinka and other members of The Mighty Handful, on the one hand, and the Russian Musical Society led by composers Anton and Nikolay Rubinstein, on the other. The later tradition of Pyotr Ilyich Tchaikovsky, one of the greatest composers of the Romantic era, was continued into the 20th century by Sergei Rachmaninoff, one of the last great champions of the Romantic style of European classical music. World-renowned composers of the 20th century include Alexander Scriabin, Alexander Glazunov, Igor Stravinsky, Sergei Prokofiev, Dmitri Shostakovich, Georgy Sviridov and Alfred Schnittke.

Soviet and Russian conservatories have turned out generations of world-renowned soloists. Among the best known are violinists David Oistrakh and Gidon Kremer, cellist Mstislav Rostropovich, pianists Vladimir Horowitz, Sviatoslav Richter, and Emil Gilels, and vocalist Galina Vishnevskaya.

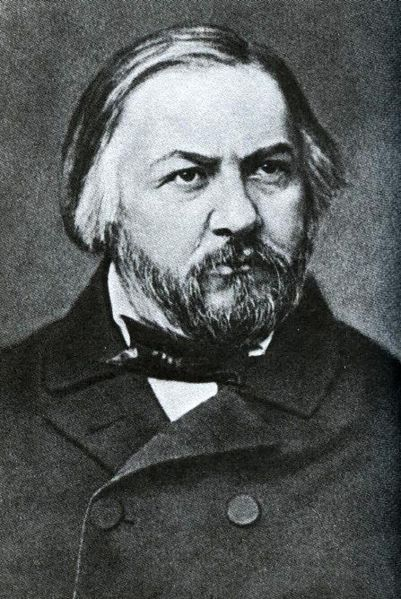
Glinka

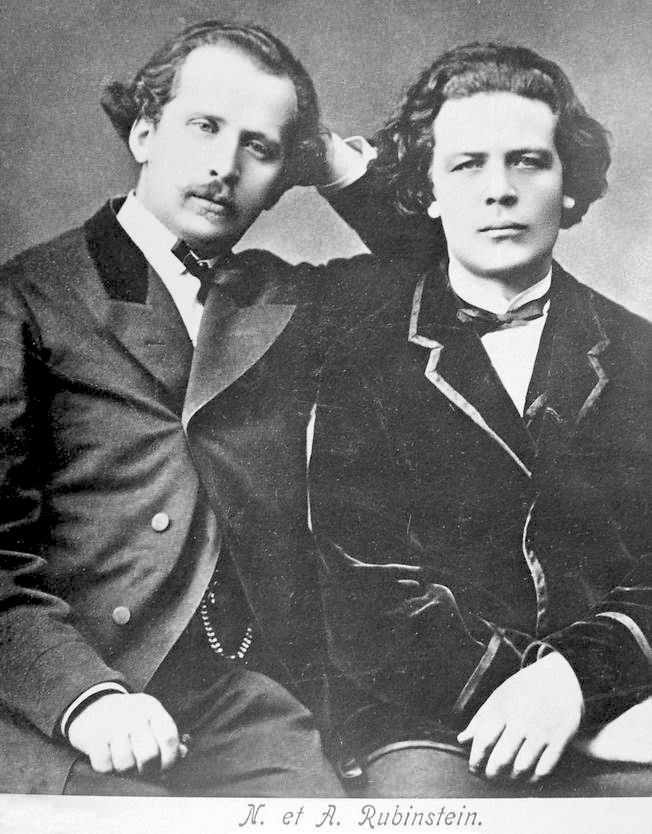
Nikolai and Anton Rubinstein

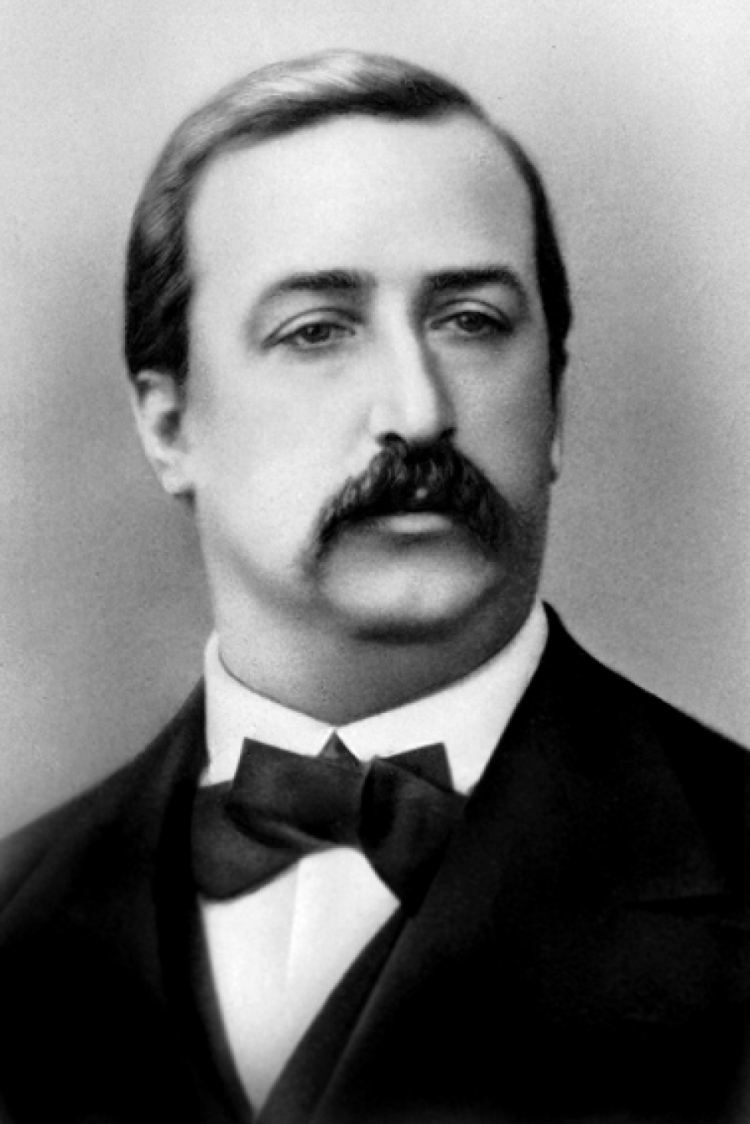
Borodin

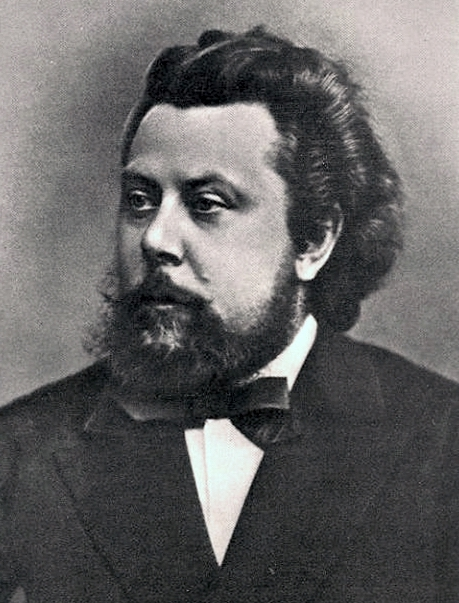
Mussorgsky

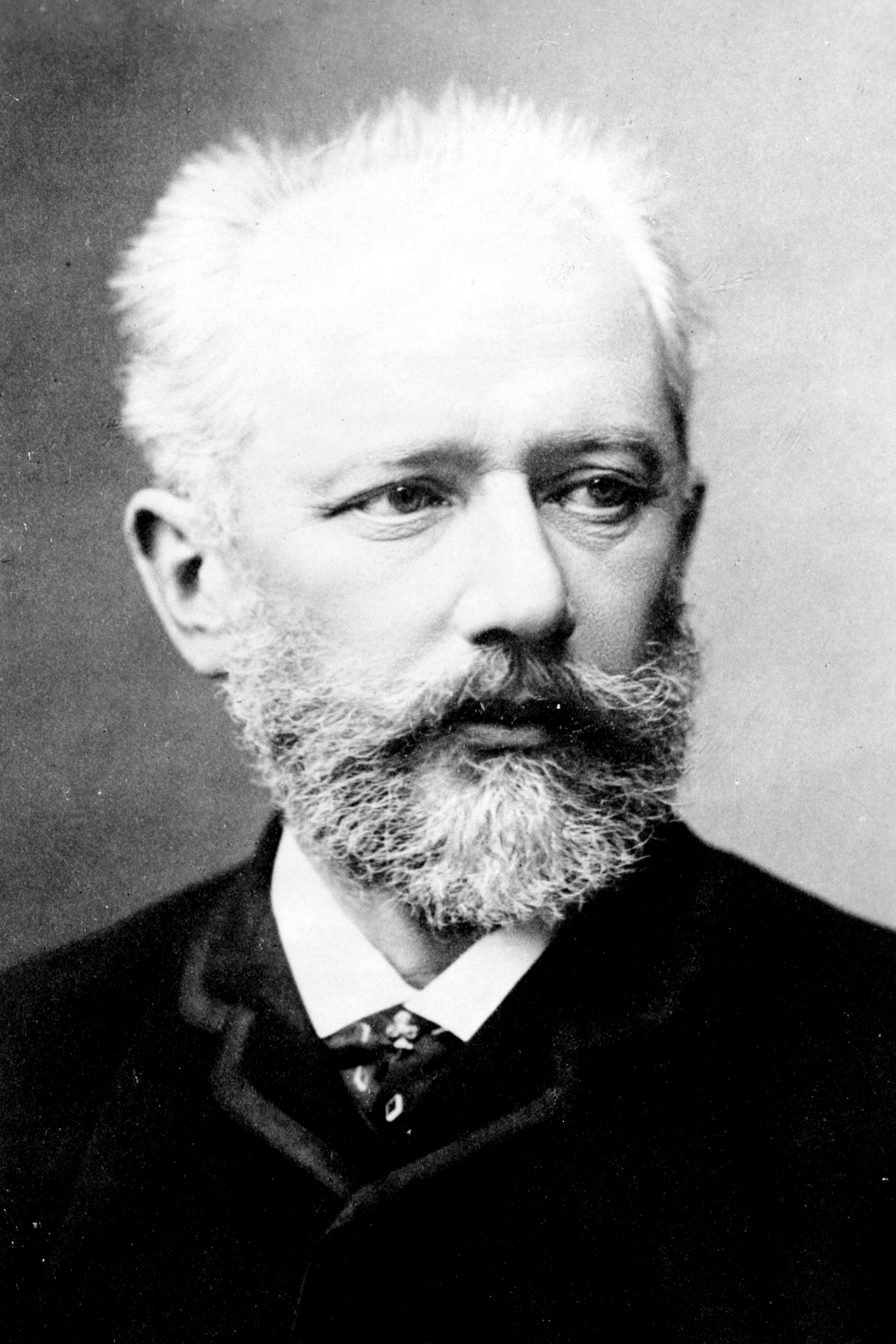
Tchaikovsky

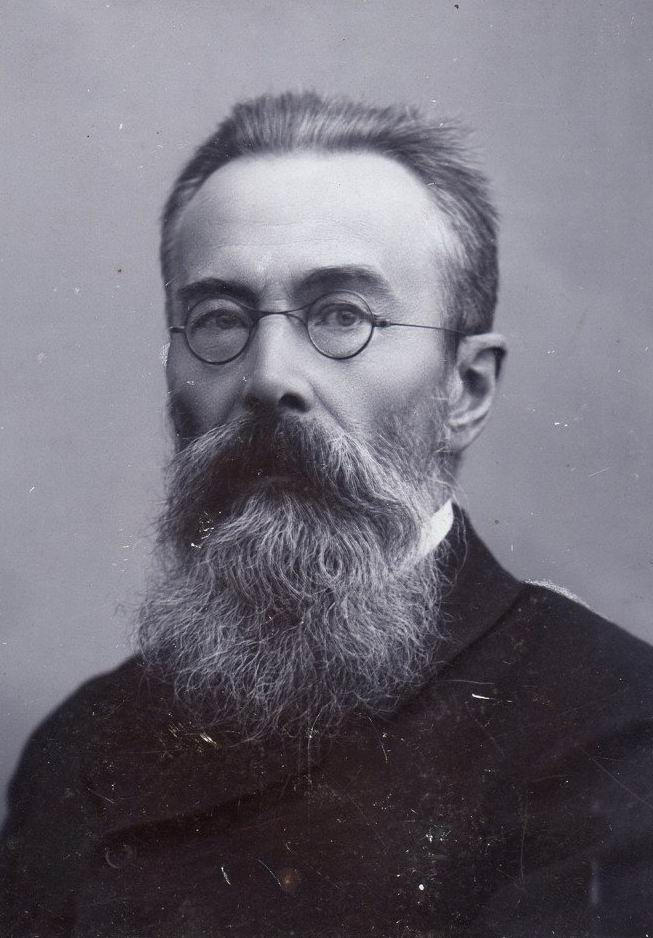
Rimsky-Korsakov

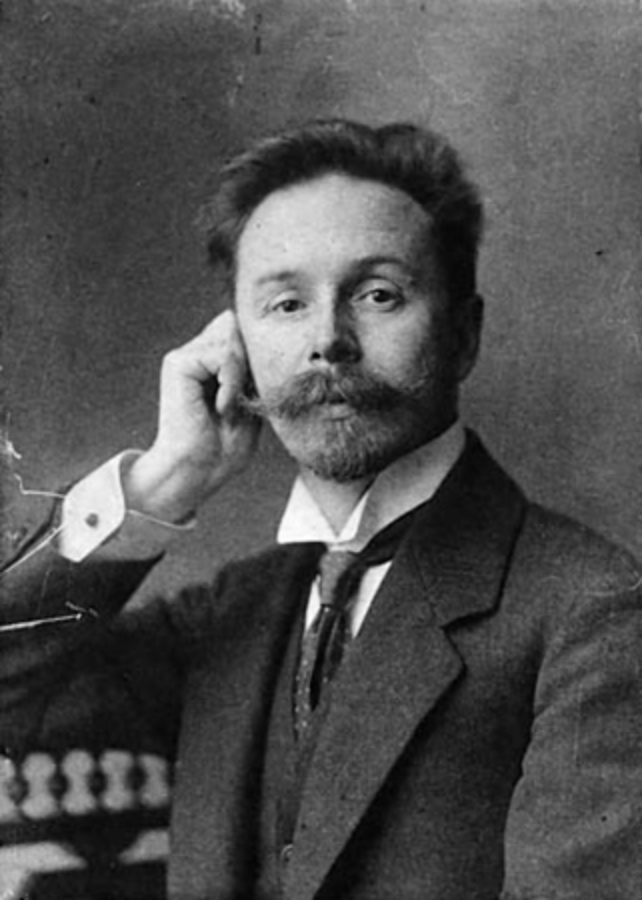
Scriabin

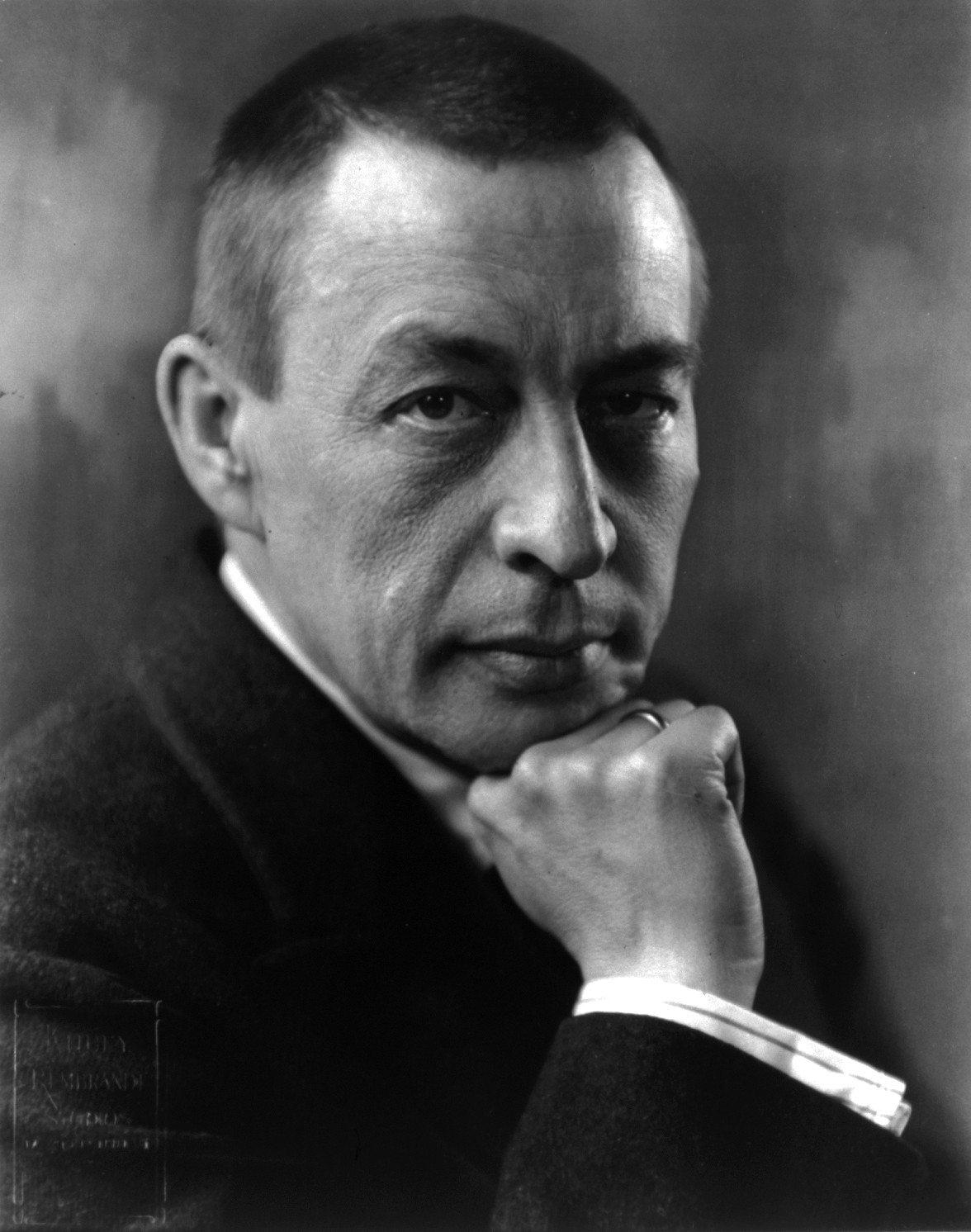
Rachmaninov

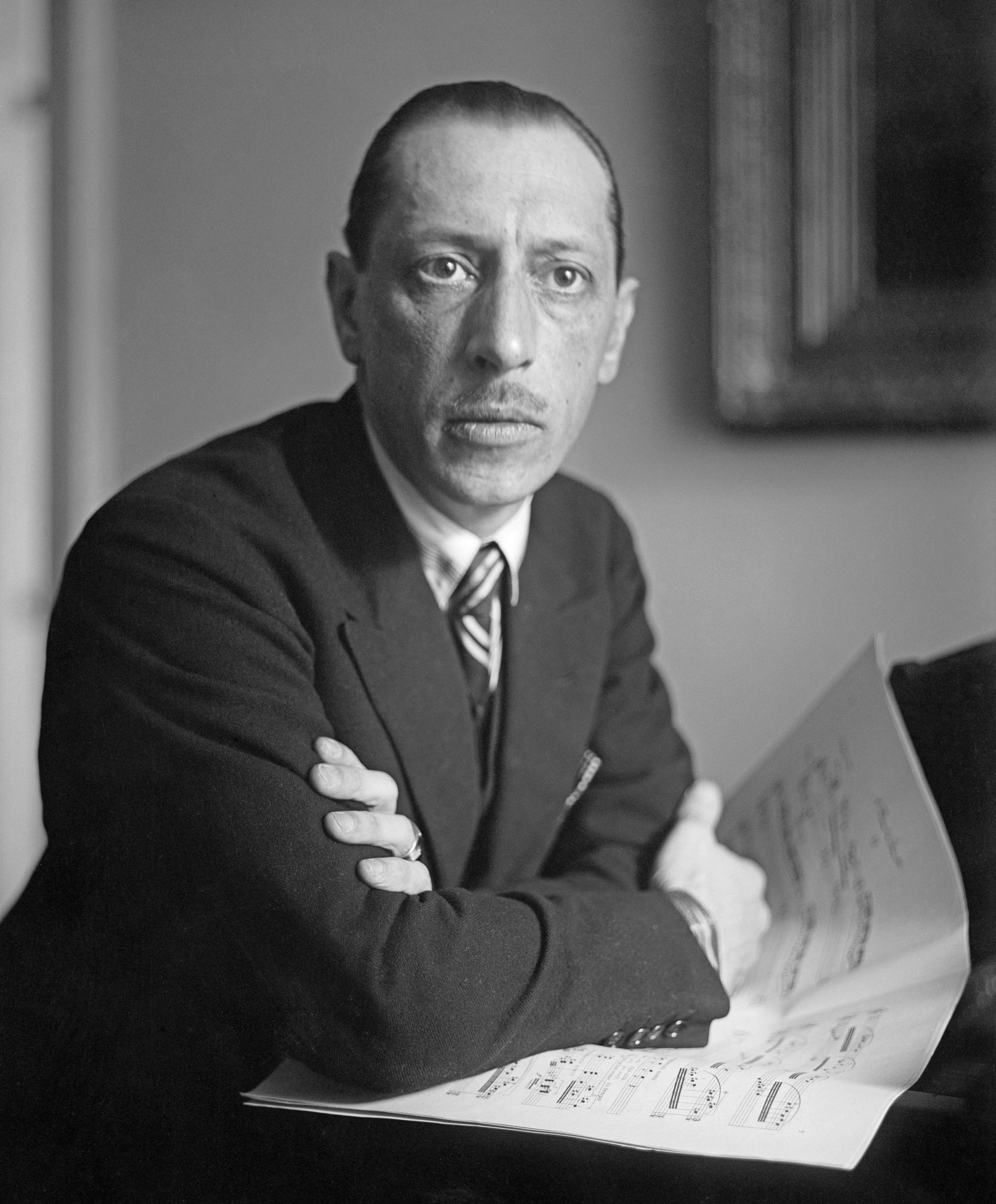
Stravinsky

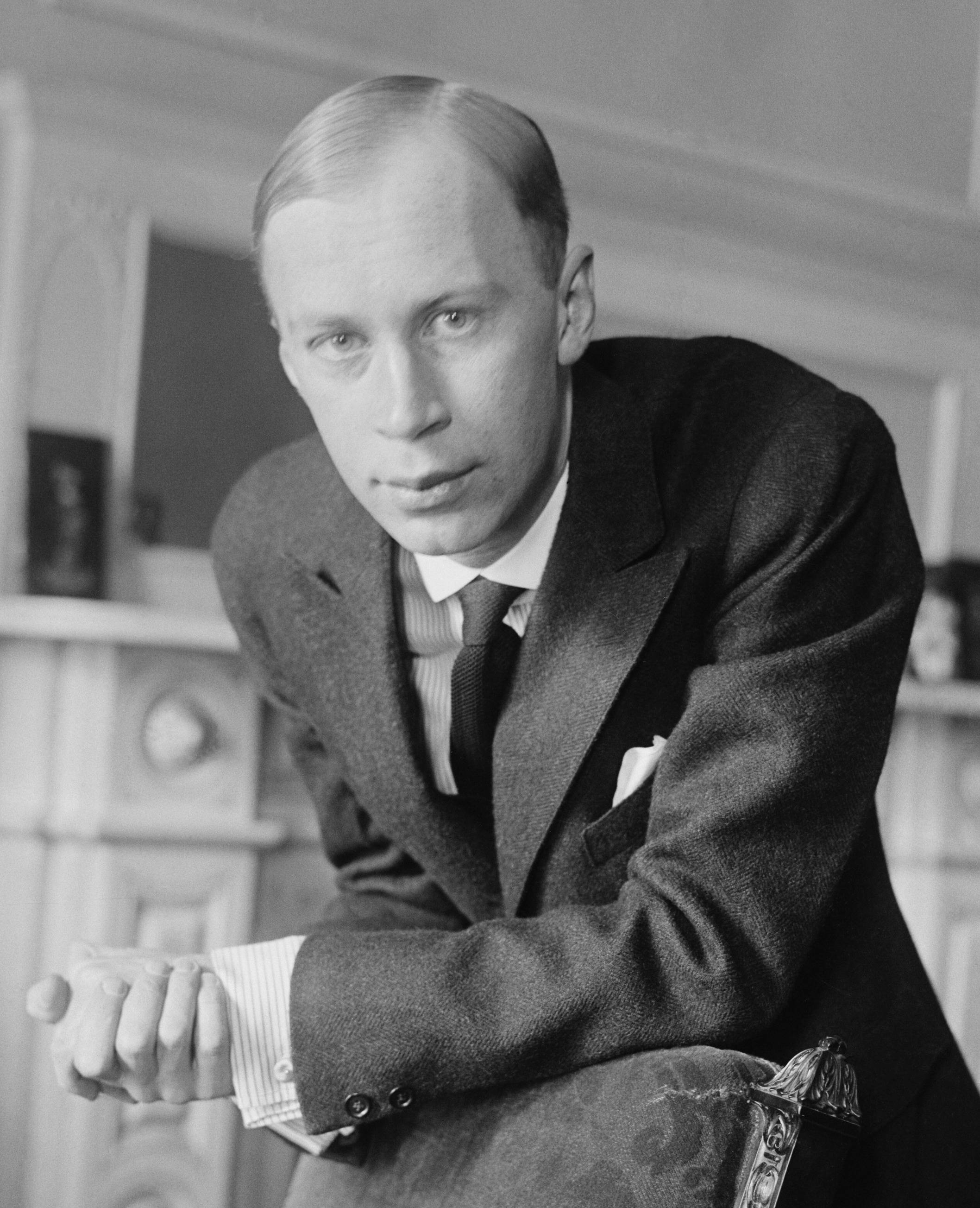
Prokofiev

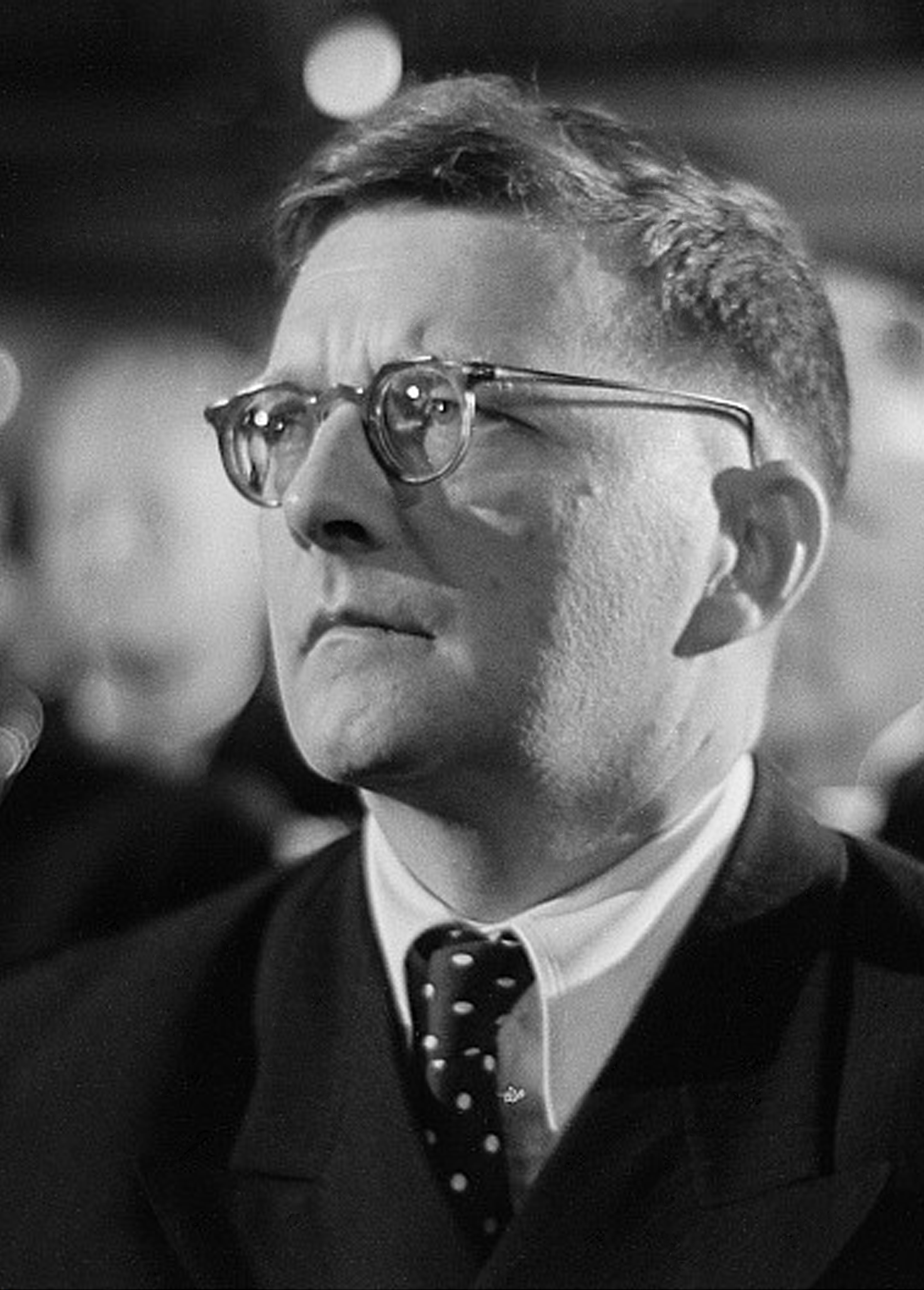
Shostakovich

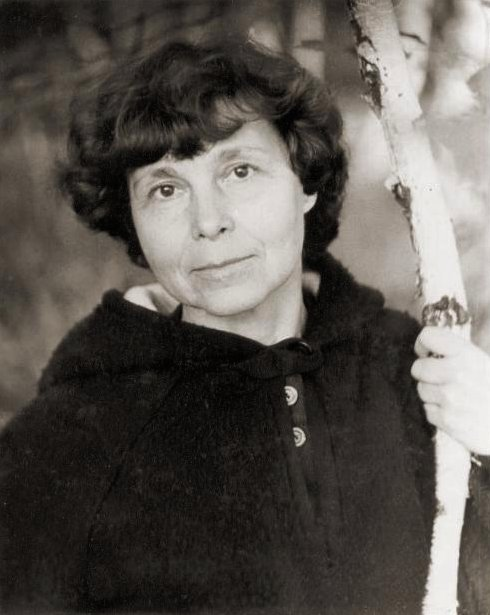
Gubaidulina

=== Ballet ===
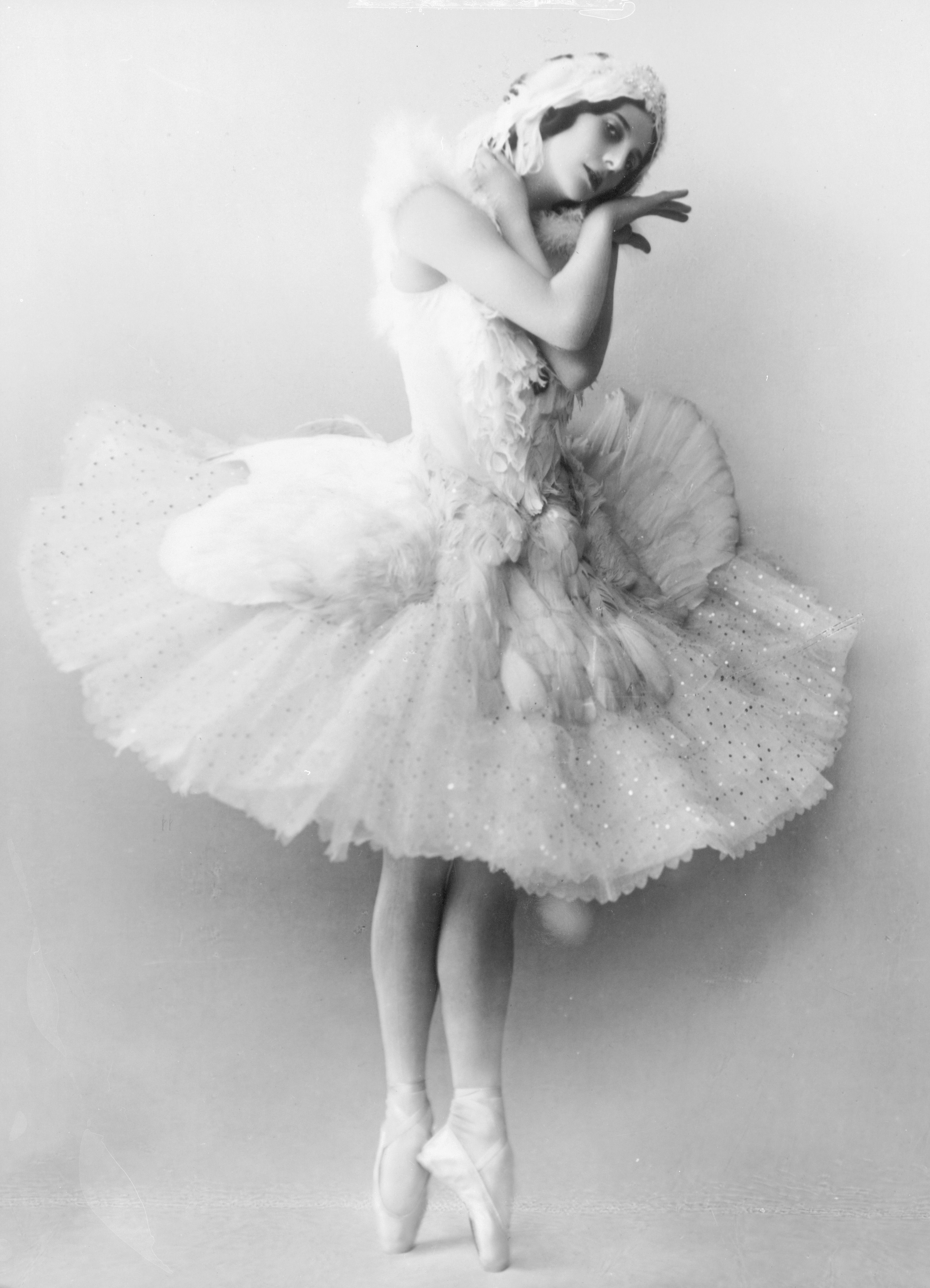
Anna Pavlova

The original purpose of the ballet in Russia was to entertain the imperial court. The first ballet company was the Imperial School of Ballet in St. Petersburg in the 1740s. The Ballets Russes was a ballet company founded in the 1909 by Sergey Diaghilev, an enormously important figure in the Russian ballet scene. Diaghilev and his Ballets Russes' travels abroad profoundly influenced the development of dance worldwide. The headquarters of his ballet company was located in Paris, France. A protégé of Diaghilev, George Balanchine, founded the New York City Ballet Company in 1948.

During the early 20th century, Russian ballet dancers Anna Pavlova and Vaslav Nijinsky rose to fame. Soviet ballet preserved the perfected 19th century traditions, and the Soviet Union's choreography schools produced one internationally famous star after another, including Maya Plisetskaya, Rudolf Nureyev, and Mikhail Baryshnikov. The Bolshoi Ballet in Moscow and the Mariinsky in Saint Petersburg remain famous throughout the world. Ballet from then on spread worldwide.

=== Opera ===
The first known opera made in Russia was A Life for the Tsar by Mikhail Glinka in 1836. This was followed by several operas such as Ruslan and Lyudmila in 1842. Russian opera was originally a combination of Russian folk music and Italian opera. After the October Revolution many opera composers left Russia. Russia's most popular operas include Boris Godunov, Eugene Onegin, The Golden Cockerel, Prince Igor, and The Queen of Spades.

=== Electronic and experimental music ===
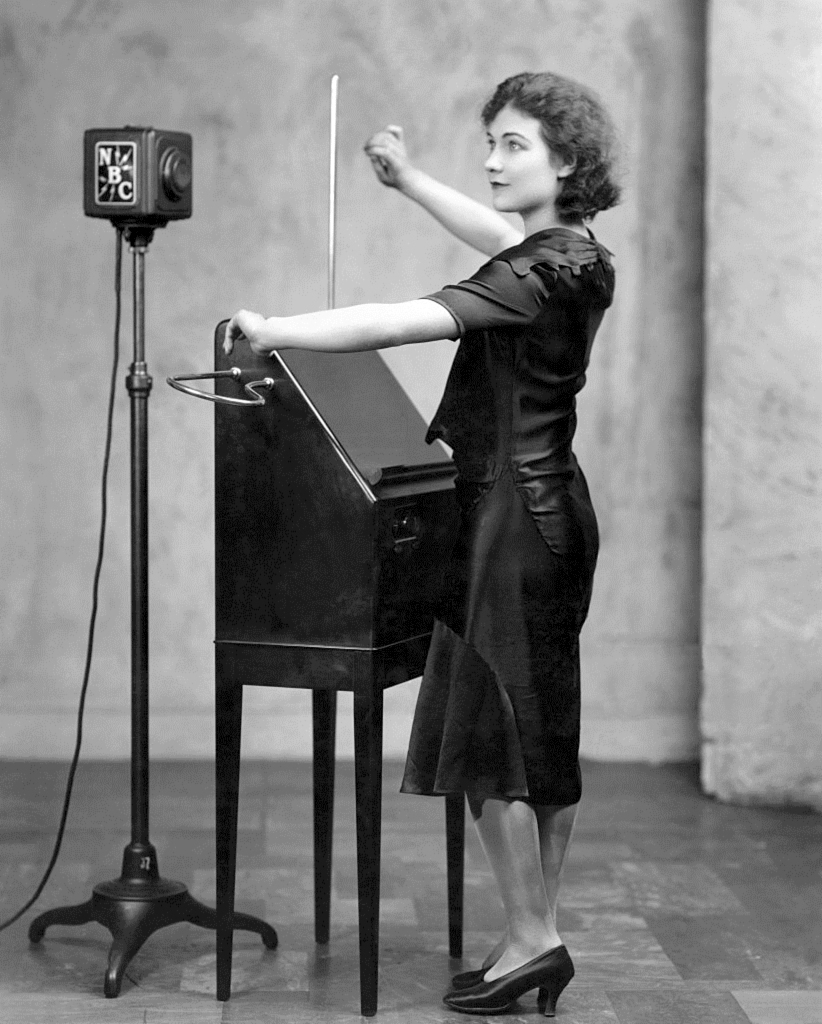
Alexandra Stepanoff playing Theremin in 1930

Russia is the place where many of the earliest experiments in electronic music and noise music took place. Arseny Avraamov's magnum opus, "Symphony of the factory sirens" (composed in 1918, performed live in 1922) stood as one of the earliest experiments in noise music and a precursor to musique concrete, Avraamov was also a notable inventor in the field of earliest electronic instruments. Theremin, one of the first mass-produced electronic musical instruments, was invented by Leon Theremin in the Soviet Union before 1928. ANS was another early electronic instrument, invented in 1937 by Soviet engineer Evgeny Murzin. Other electronic instruments, invented around the same time in the Soviet Union and also by Russian emigrees, included "la croix sonore" ("a sounding cross") by Nikolai Obukhov (1929), violena (Russian: виолена) by Soviet engineer Alexander Gurov and ilston (Russian: ильстон) by Ilya Ilsarov, sonar (Russian: сонар) by Nikita Ananiev, ekvodin (Russian: экводин) by Andrei Volodin, kompanola (Russian: компанола) by Igor Simonov, and many others.

During the 1940s, new electronic instruments were invented in the Soviet Union, including "V-9" (Russian: В-9) by Andrei Volodin, emiriton (Russian: эмиритон) by Andrey Rimsky-Korsakov and A.Ivanov. Emiriton was praised by Shostakovich, and an ensemble of four emiritons toured Ukrainian Soviet Socialist Republic in 1940.

In 1956, Ensemble of Electromusical Instruments (Russian: Ансамбль Электромузыкальных Инструментов), or EMI (Russian: ЭМИ) was founded by Vyacheslav Mescherin. Among many synthesizers used by EMI were theremins, electronic harps, electronic organs, ekvodin and a Soviet-made reverb unit. EMI played music reminiscent of the Western space-age pop.

In 1965, production of the first consumer-grade synthesizer in the Soviet Union, called "Yunost-70" (Youth-70) (Russian: Юность-70), was launched.

In 1966, Moscow Experimental Electronic Music Studio (MESEM) (Russian: МЭСЭМ) was created by Evgeny Murzin, and it was officially opened in 1967. Several notable electronic and experimental composers emerged from the studio, including Edison Denisov, Sofia Gubaidulina, Stanislav Kreichi, Alexander Nemtin, Sándor Kallós, Vladimir Martynov, Alfred Schnittke and one of the pioneers of new age music, Eduard Artemiev. Artemiev was among the composers, whose work laid down the foundation of trance music almost two decades later.

During the late 1960s, electronic light music ensembles emerged in the Soviet Union, among them were Ensemble Rokoko, Ensemble Elektron and various jazz ensembles. Their music was frequently transmitted by radio abroad, an effort to increase foreign tourism to the USSR.

By the early 1970s, electronic and electroacoustic instruments became a staple in Soviet estrada and VIA music. Electronic music found acceptance in the Soviet cinema, for instance it was used by Andrei Tarkovsky in "Solaris", "Mirror", "Stalker", was used in Andrei Konchalovsky's "Siberiade", but also was used in more accessible movies, such as "Diamond hand".

Among official soundtracks for the 1980 Olympic Games in Moscow opening and closing ceremonies was electronic "Oh Thou Sport, you are eternal progress" (Russian: О, спорт - ты вечный прогресс) from the electronic cantata "Ode to the good messenger" (Russian: Ода доброму вестнику) composed by Eduard Artemiev. The sound director for the opening ceremony, Yury Bogdanov, was another notable alumni of MESEM and author of more than 200 electronic soundtracks for Soviet movies, and numerous electronic and experimental albums.

After the fall of Soviet Union, several electronic music subgenres have emerged from Russia, namely hardbass, drift phonk, dark psytrance, hookah rap, operplugg, sovietwave.

=== Modern music ===
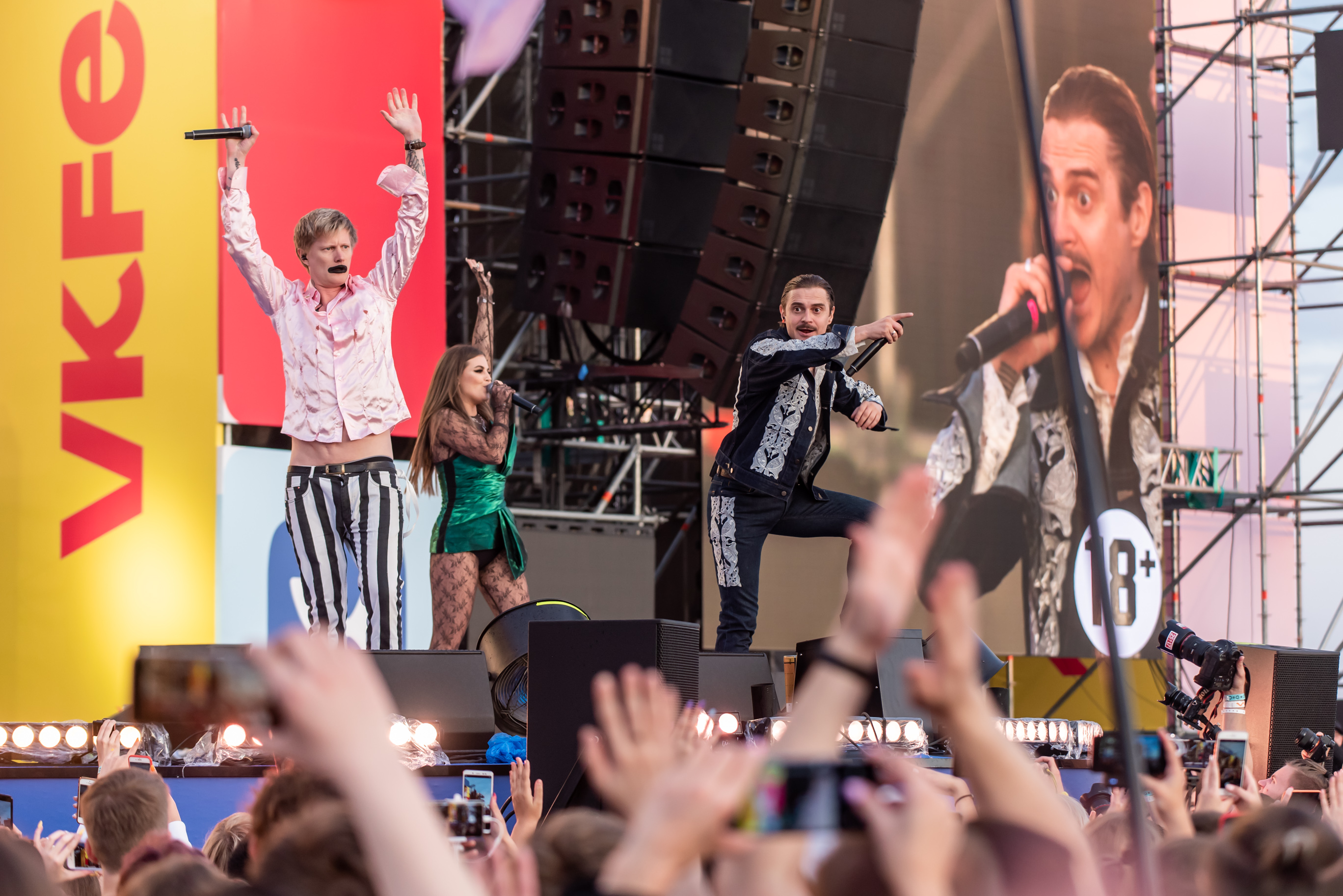
Little Big is a famous rave band in Russia.

During the Soviet times, popular music also produced a number of renowned figures, such as the two balladeers—Vladimir Vysotsky and Bulat Okudzhava, and performers such as Alla Pugacheva. Jazz, even with sanctions from Soviet authorities, flourished and evolved into one of the country's most popular musical forms. The Ganelin Trio have been described by critics as the greatest ensemble of free-jazz in continental Europe. By the 1980s, rock music became popular across Russia, and produced bands such as Aria, Aquarium, DDT, and Kino. Pop music in Russia has continued to flourish since the 1960s, with globally famous acts such as t.A.T.u. In the recent times, Little Big, a rave band, has gained popularity in Russia and across Europe. Other modern music can be found in the media, such as YouTube. For example, the song "Moscow, Moscow," is extremely popular among memes and other means of entertainment.

=== Cinema ===
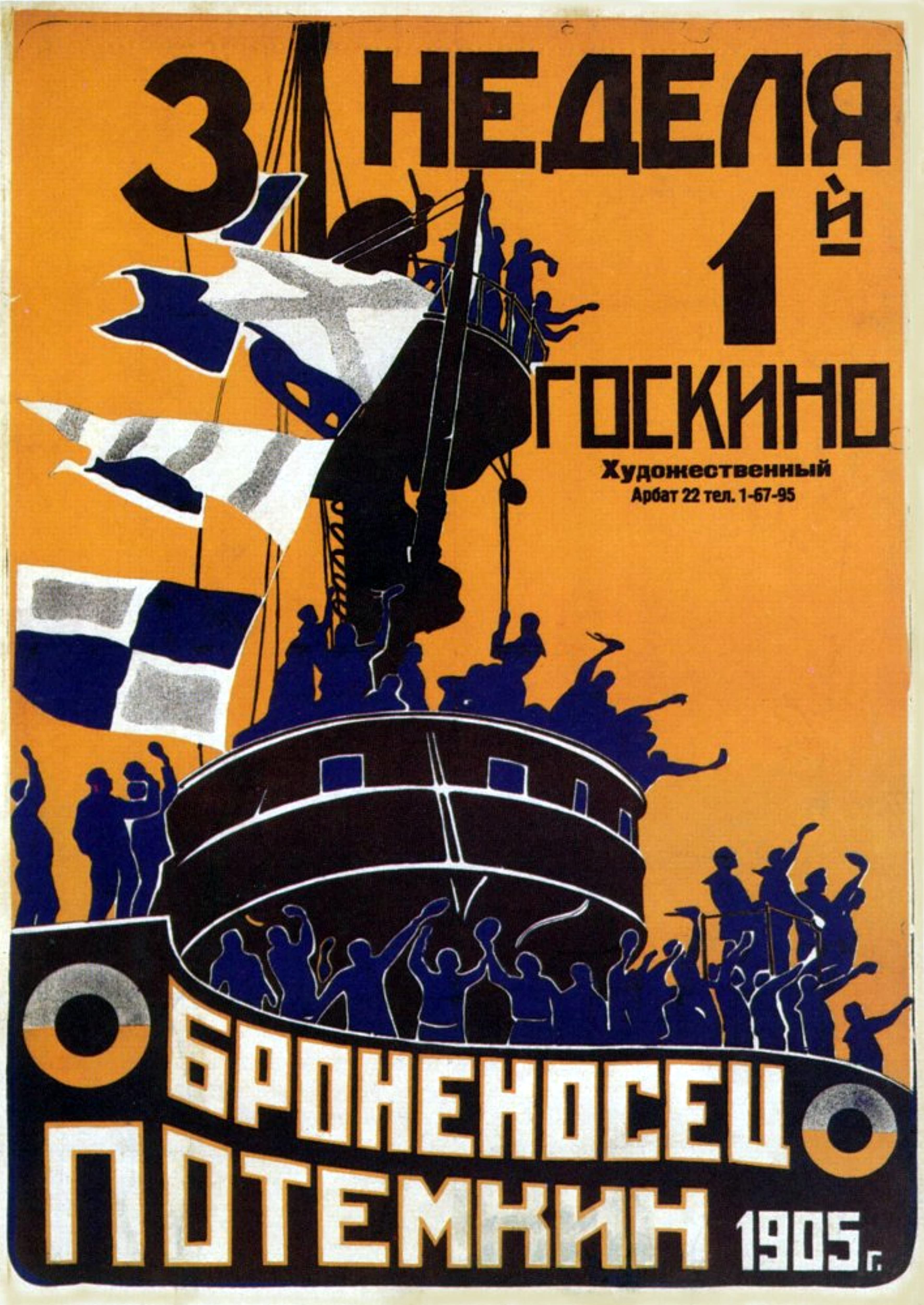
Poster of Battleship Potemkin (1925) by Sergei Eisenstein, which was named the greatest film of all time at the Brussels World's Fair in 1958.

Russian and later Soviet cinema was a hotbed of invention, resulting in world-renowned films such as The Battleship Potemkin. Soviet-era filmmakers, most notably Sergei Eisenstein and Andrei Tarkovsky, would go on to become among of the world's most innovative and influential directors. Eisenstein was a student of Lev Kuleshov, who developed the groundbreaking Soviet montage theory of film editing at the world's first film school, the All-Union Institute of Cinematography. Dziga Vertov's "Kino-Eye" theory had a huge impact on the development of documentary filmmaking and cinema realism. Many Soviet socialist realism films were artistically successful, including Chapaev, The Cranes Are Flying, and Ballad of a Soldier.

The 1960s and 1970s saw a greater variety of artistic styles in Soviet cinema. The comedies of Eldar Ryazanov and Leonid Gaidai of that time were immensely popular, with many of the catchphrases still in use today. In 1961–68 Sergey Bondarchuk directed an Oscar-winning film adaptation of Leo Tolstoy's epic War and Peace, which was the most expensive film made in the Soviet Union. In 1969, Vladimir Motyl's White Sun of the Desert was released, a very popular film in a genre of ostern; the film is traditionally watched by cosmonauts before any trip into space. In 2002, Russian Ark was the first feature film ever to be shot in a single take. Today, the Russian cinema industry continues to expand.

=== Animation ===
Russia also has a long and rich tradition of animation, which started already in the late Russian Empire times. Most of Russia's cartoon production for cinema and television was created during Soviet times, when Soyuzmultfilm studio was the largest animation producer. Soviet animators developed a great and unmatched variety of pioneering techniques and aesthetic styles, with prominent directors including Ivan Ivanov-Vano, Fyodor Khitruk and Aleksandr Tatarskiy. Soviet cartoons are still a source for many popular catch phrases, while such cartoon heroes as Russian-style Winnie-the-Pooh, cute little Cheburashka, Wolf and Hare from Nu, Pogodi! being iconic images in Russia and many surrounding countries. The traditions of Soviet animation were developed in the past decade by such directors as Aleksandr Petrov and studios like Melnitsa, along with Ivan Maximov.

== Philosophy ==
Some Russian writers, like Tolstoy and Dostoyevsky, are known also as philosophers, while many more authors are known primarily for their philosophical works. Russian philosophy blossomed since the 19th century, when it was defined initially by the opposition of Westernizers, advocating Russia's following the Western political and economical models, and Slavophiles, insisting on developing Russia as a unique civilization. The latter group includes Nikolai Danilevsky and Konstantin Leontiev, the early founders of eurasianism.

In its further developments, Russian philosophy was always marked by a deep connection to literature and interest in creativity, society, politics and nationalism; cosmos and religion were other primary subjects. Notable philosophers of the late 19th and early 20th centuries, predominantly religious, include Vladimir Solovyov, Sergei Bulgakov, Pavel Florensky, Nikolai Berdyaev, Semyon Frank, Nikolay Lossky, Vasily Rozanov, and Vladimir Vernadsky. In the 20th century Russian philosophy became dominated by Marxism.

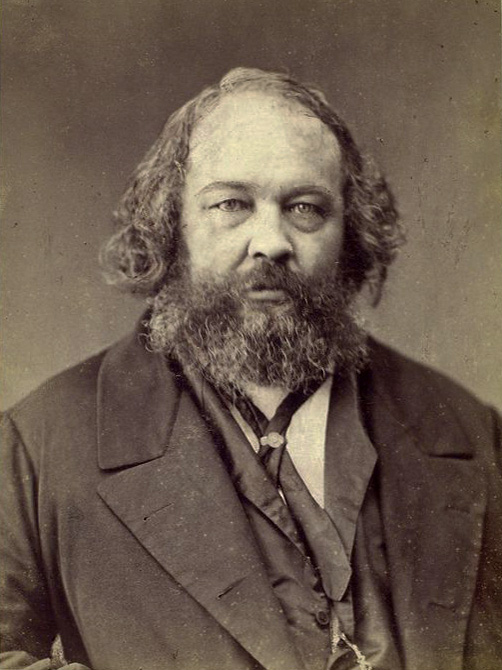
Bakunin

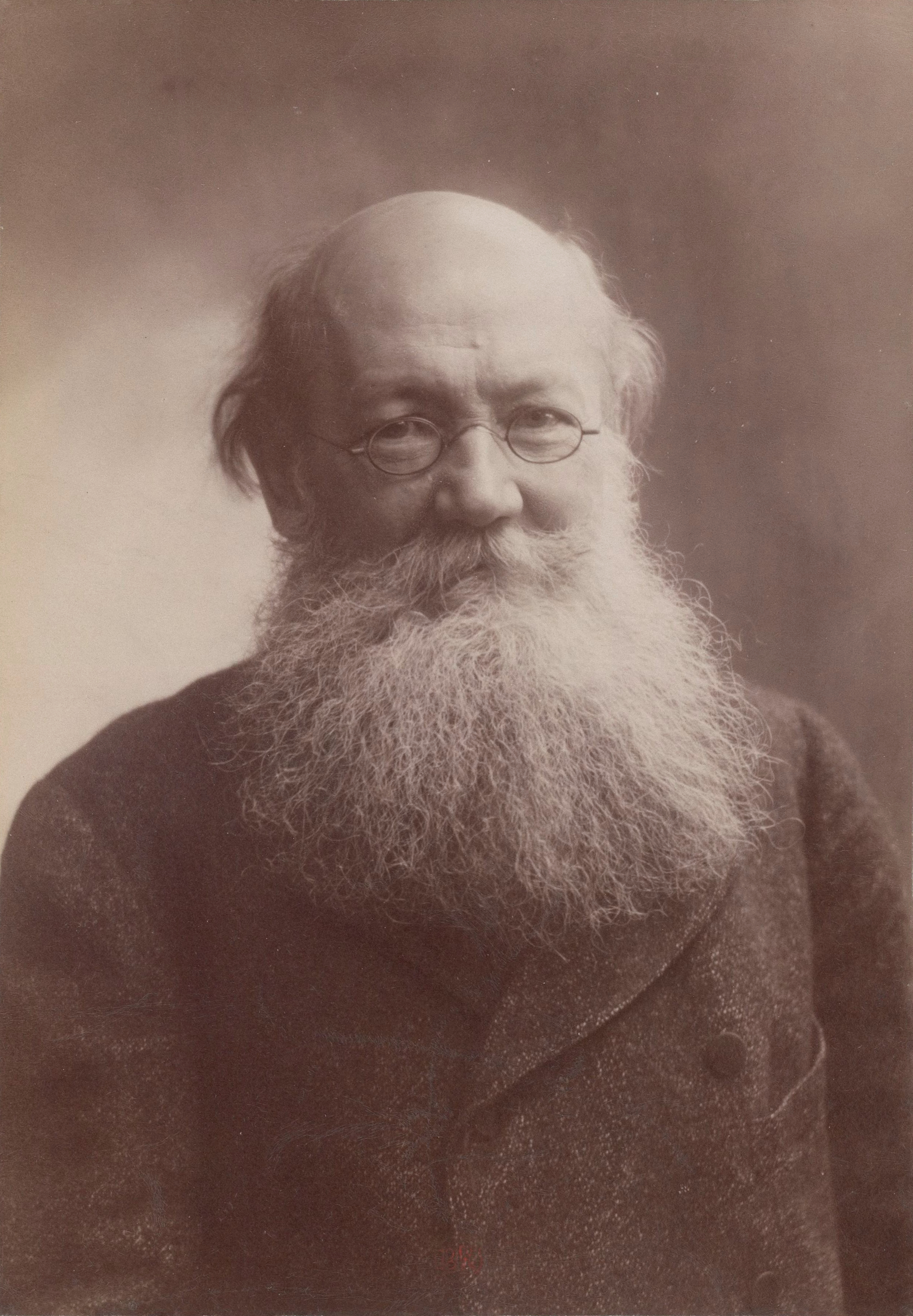
Kropotkin

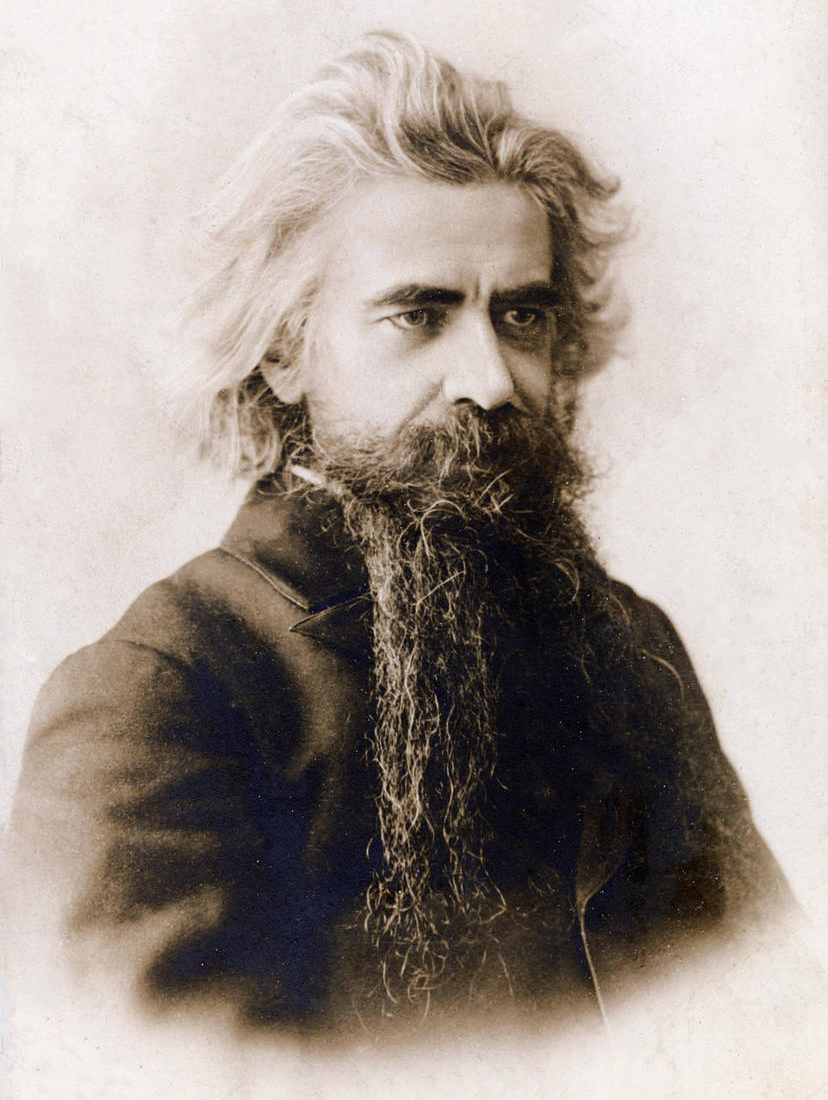
Solovyov

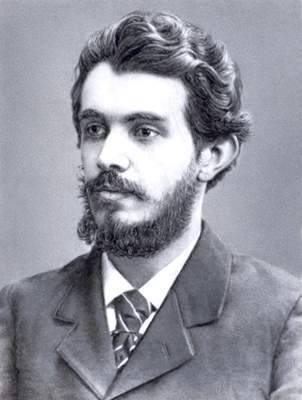
Berdyaev

== Science and technology ==
=== Radio and TV ===
Logo of the state-owned TV channel Russia-1

Russia has almost 37 thousand media outlets, over 35 thousand newspapers, and 12 thousand magazines. The largest internationally operating news agencies in Russia are TASS, RIA Novosti, and Interfax. Television is the most popular media in Russia, as 99% of the Russian population receives at least one television channel, and roughly 60% of Russians watch television on a daily basis. The most watched TV channels in Russia include the state-owned Russia-1, Channel One Russia, NTV, REN TV, and Russia Today. Popular nationwide radio stations in Russia include Radio Rossii, Echo of Moscow, Radio Mayak, Radio Yunost, and Russkoye Radio.

=== Internet ===
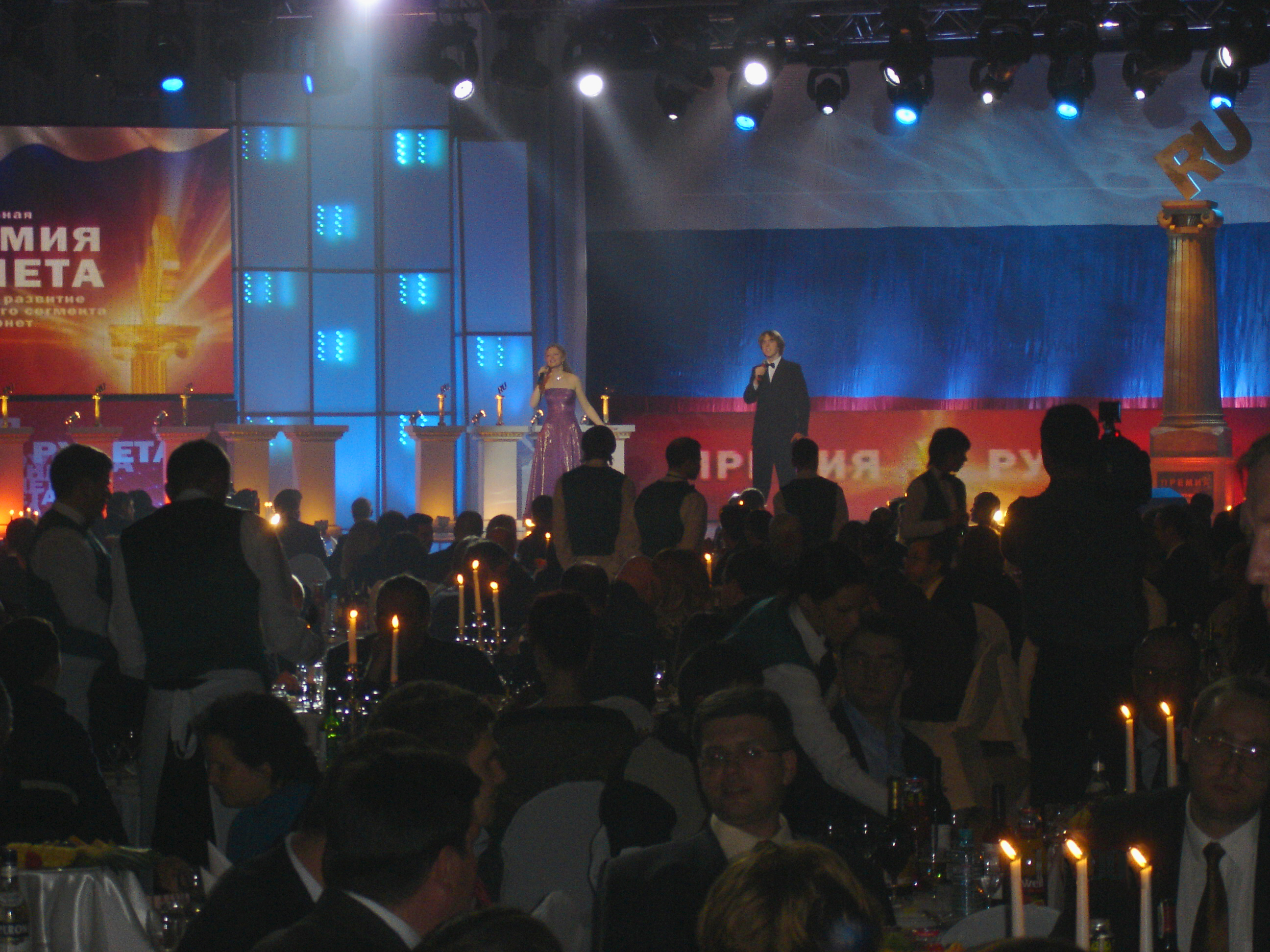
Runet Prize ceremony

Originating from Russian scientific community and telecommunication industries, a specific Russian culture of using the Internet has been established since the early 1990s. In the second half of the 1990s, the term Runet was coined to call the segment of Internet written or understood in the Russian language. Whereas the Internet "has no boundaries", "Russian Internet" (online communications in the Russian language) can not be localized solely to the users residing in the Russian Federation as it includes Russian-speaking people from all around the world. This segment includes millions of users in other ex-USSR countries, Israel and others abroad diasporas.

With the introduction of the Web, many social and cultural events found reflections within the Russian Internet society. Various online communities formed, and the most popular one grew out of the Russian-speaking users of the California-based blogging platform LiveJournal (which was completely bought out in December 2007 by Russian firm SUP Fabrik). In January 2008 a LiveJournal blog of the "3rd statesman" Sergey Mironov had appeared and he was shortly followed by the new President Dmitry Medvedev who opened a personal video blog which was later also expanded with a LiveJournal version.

As of late, there are scores of websites offering Russian language content including mass media, e-commerce, search engines and so on. Particularly notorious are the "Russian Hackers". Russian web design studios, software and web-hosting enterprises offer a variety of services, and the results form a sort of national digital culture. E-commerce giants such as Google and Microsoft have their Russian branches. In September 2007, the national domain .ru passed the milestone of a million domain names. By the end of the 2000s, VKontakte social network became the most populated in the Runet.

=== Science and innovation ===
Russia's research and development budget is the world's ninth-highest, with an expenditure of approximately 422 billion rubles on domestic research and development. In 2019, Russia was ranked tenth worldwide in the number of scientific publications. Russia ranked 45th in the Global Innovation Index in 2021. Since 1904, Nobel Prize were awarded to twenty-six Soviets and Russians in physics, chemistry, medicine, economy, literature and peace.

Mikhail Lomonosov proposed the conservation of mass in chemical reactions, discovered the atmosphere of Venus, and founded modern geology. Since the times of Nikolay Lobachevsky, who pioneered the non-Euclidean geometry, and a prominent tutor Pafnuty Chebyshev, Russian mathematicians became among the world's most influential. Dmitry Mendeleev invented the Periodic table, the main framework of modern chemistry. Sofya Kovalevskaya was a pioneer among women in mathematics in the 19th century. Nine Soviet/Russian mathematicians have been awarded with the Fields Medal. Grigori Perelman was offered the first ever Clay Millennium Prize Problems Award for his final proof of the Poincaré conjecture in 2002, as well as the Fields Medal in 2006, both of which he infamously declined.

Alexander Popov was among the inventors of radio, while Nikolai Basov and Alexander Prokhorov were co-inventors of laser and maser. Zhores Alferov contributed significantly to the creation of modern heterostructure physics and electronics. Oleg Losev made crucial contributions in the field of semiconductor junctions, and discovered light-emitting diodes. Vladimir Vernadsky is considered one of the founders of geochemistry, biogeochemistry, and radiogeology. Élie Metchnikoff is known for his groundbreaking research in immunology. Ivan Pavlov is known chiefly for his work in classical conditioning. Lev Landau made fundamental contributions to many areas of theoretical physics.

Nikolai Vavilov was best known for having identified the centers of origin of cultivated plants. Many famous Russian scientists and inventors were émigrés. Igor Sikorsky was an aviation pioneer. Vladimir Zworykin was the inventor of the iconoscope and kinescope television systems. Theodosius Dobzhansky was the central figure in the field of evolutionary biology for his work in shaping the modern synthesis. George Gamow was one of the foremost advocates of the Big Bang theory. Many foreign scientists lived and worked in Russia for a long period, such as Leonard Euler and Alfred Nobel.

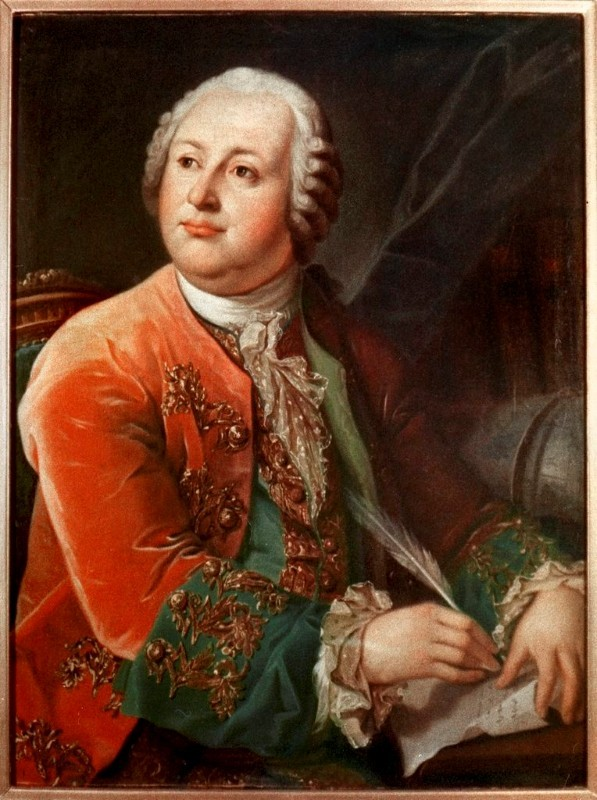
Lomonosov

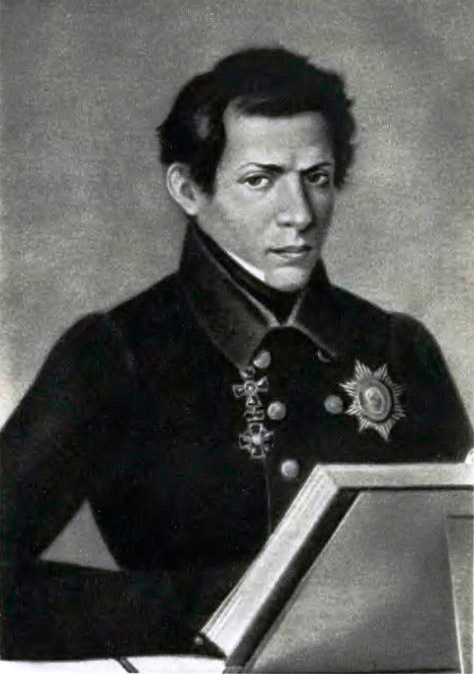
Lobachevsky

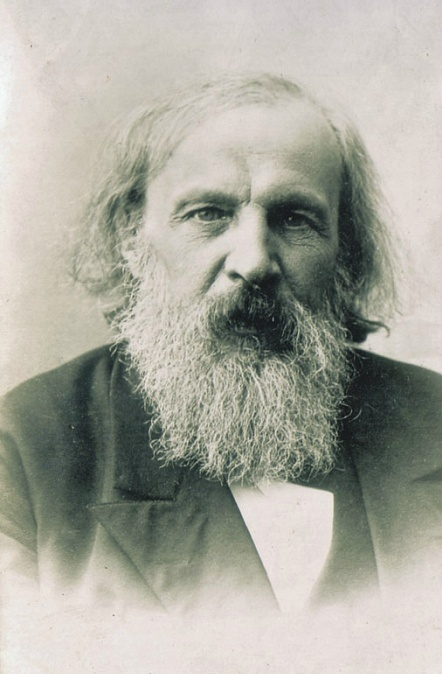
Mendeleev

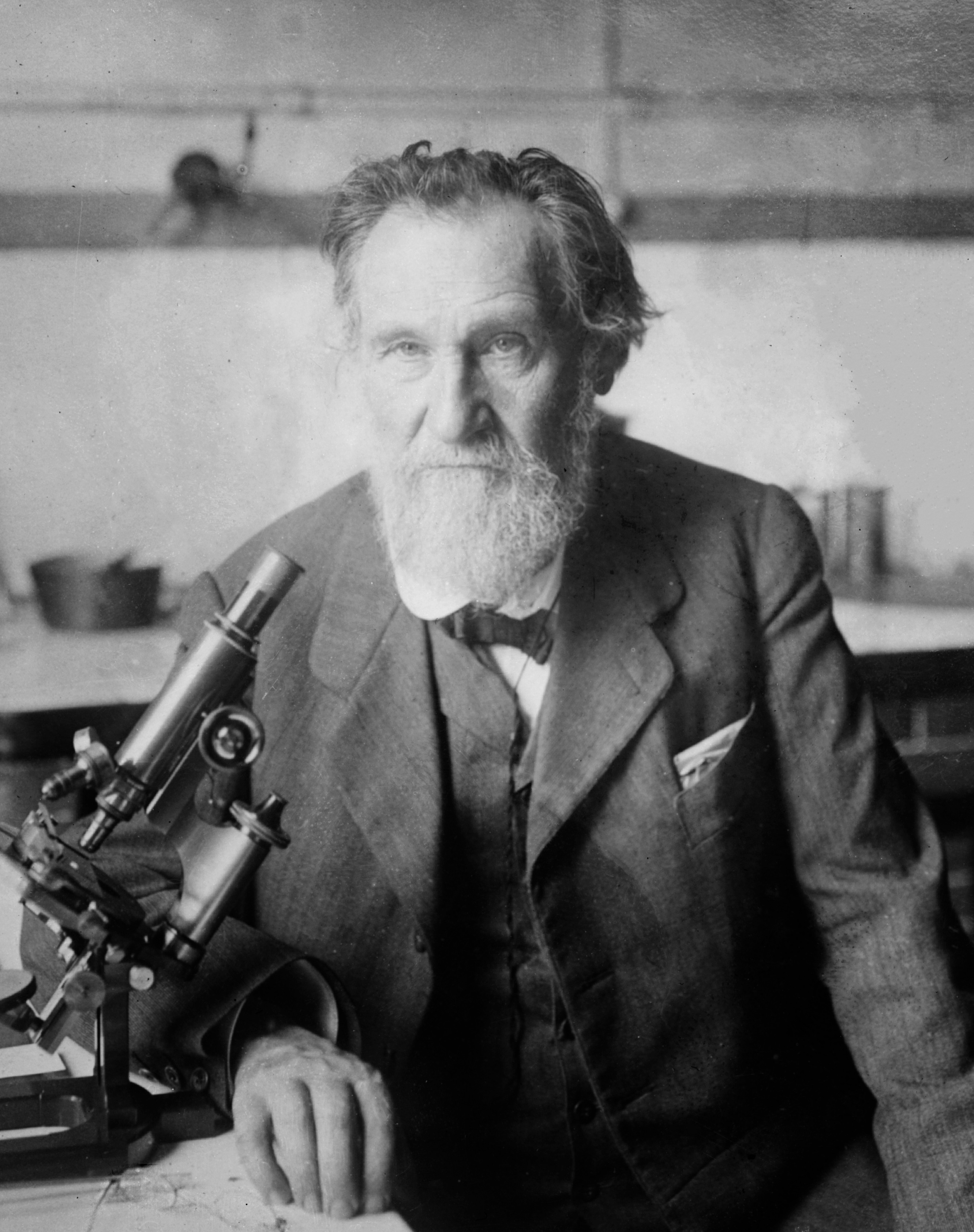
Mechnikov

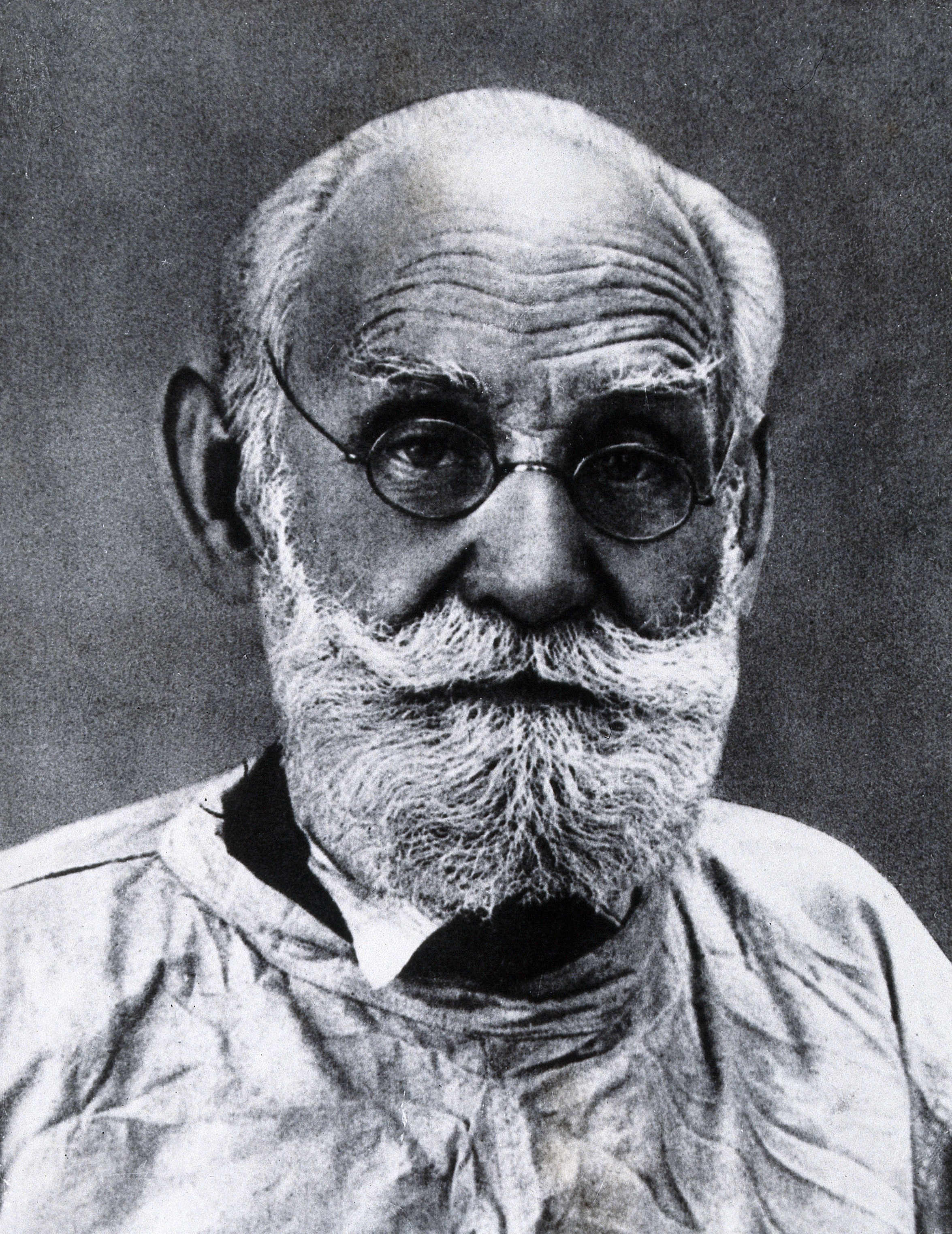
Pavlov

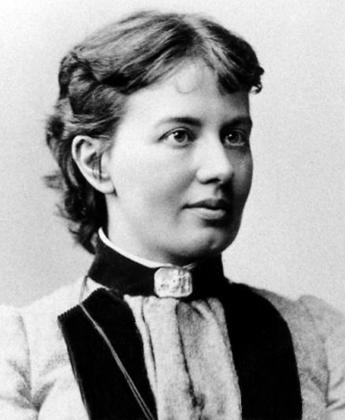
Kovalevskaya

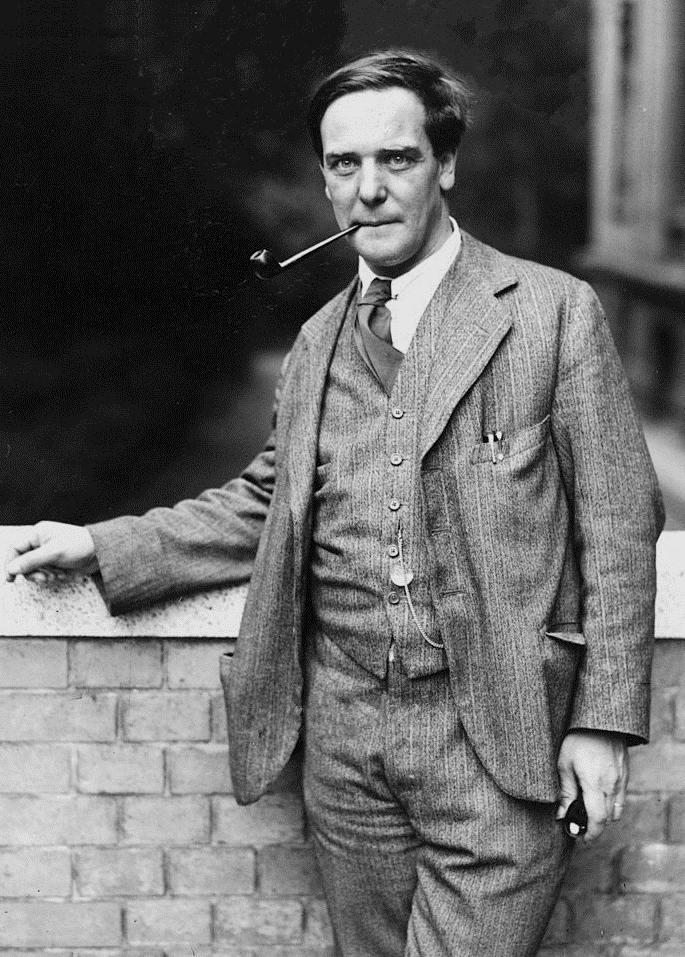
Kapitsa

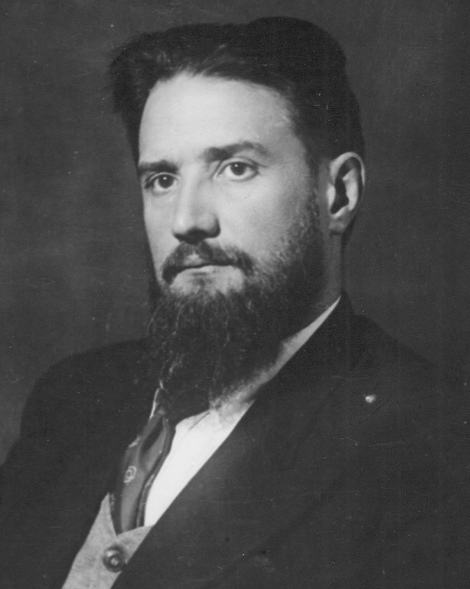
Kurchatov

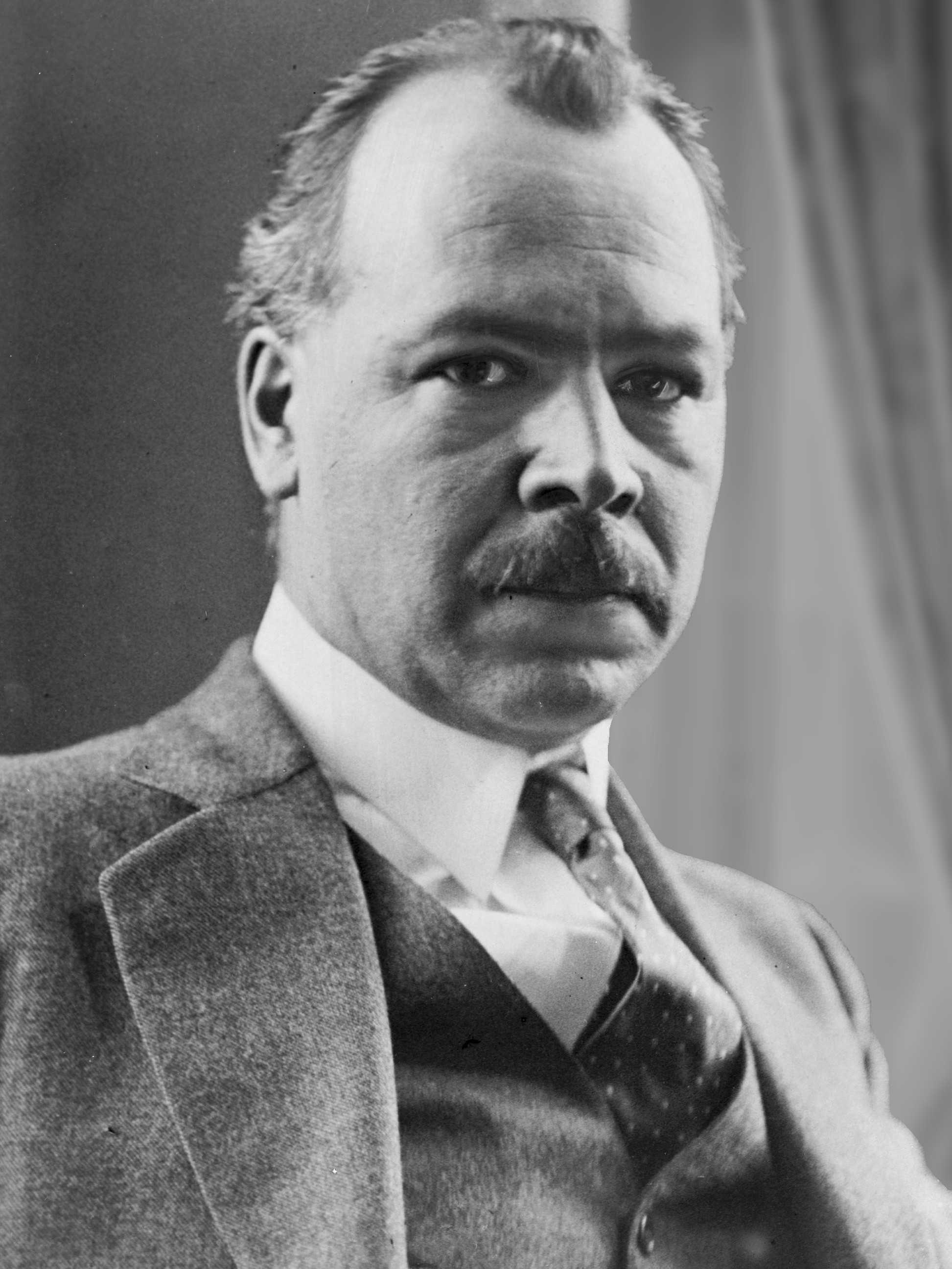
Vavilov

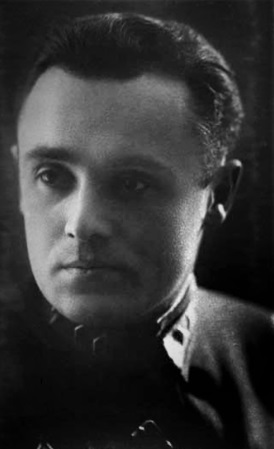
Korolyov

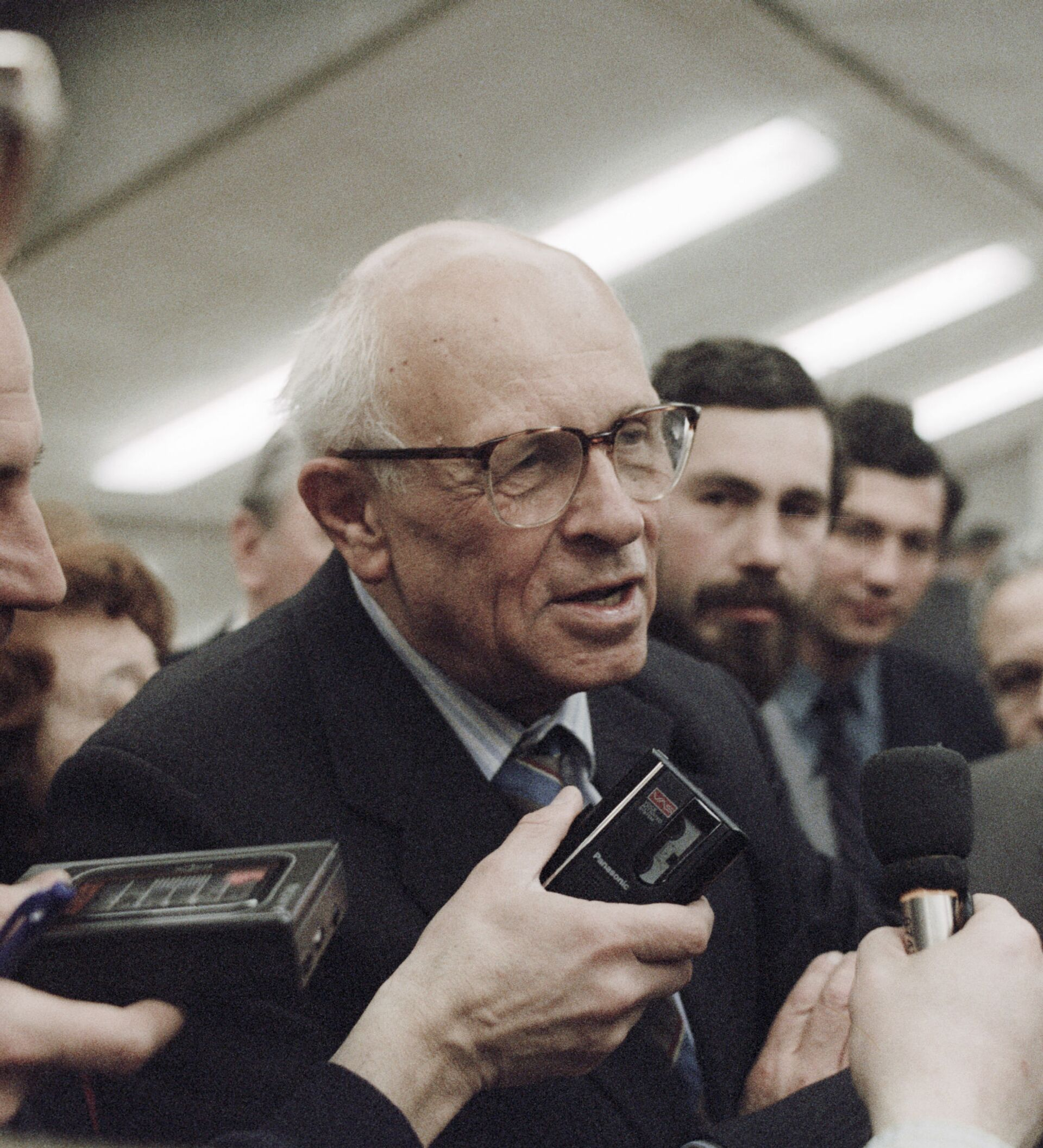
Sakharov

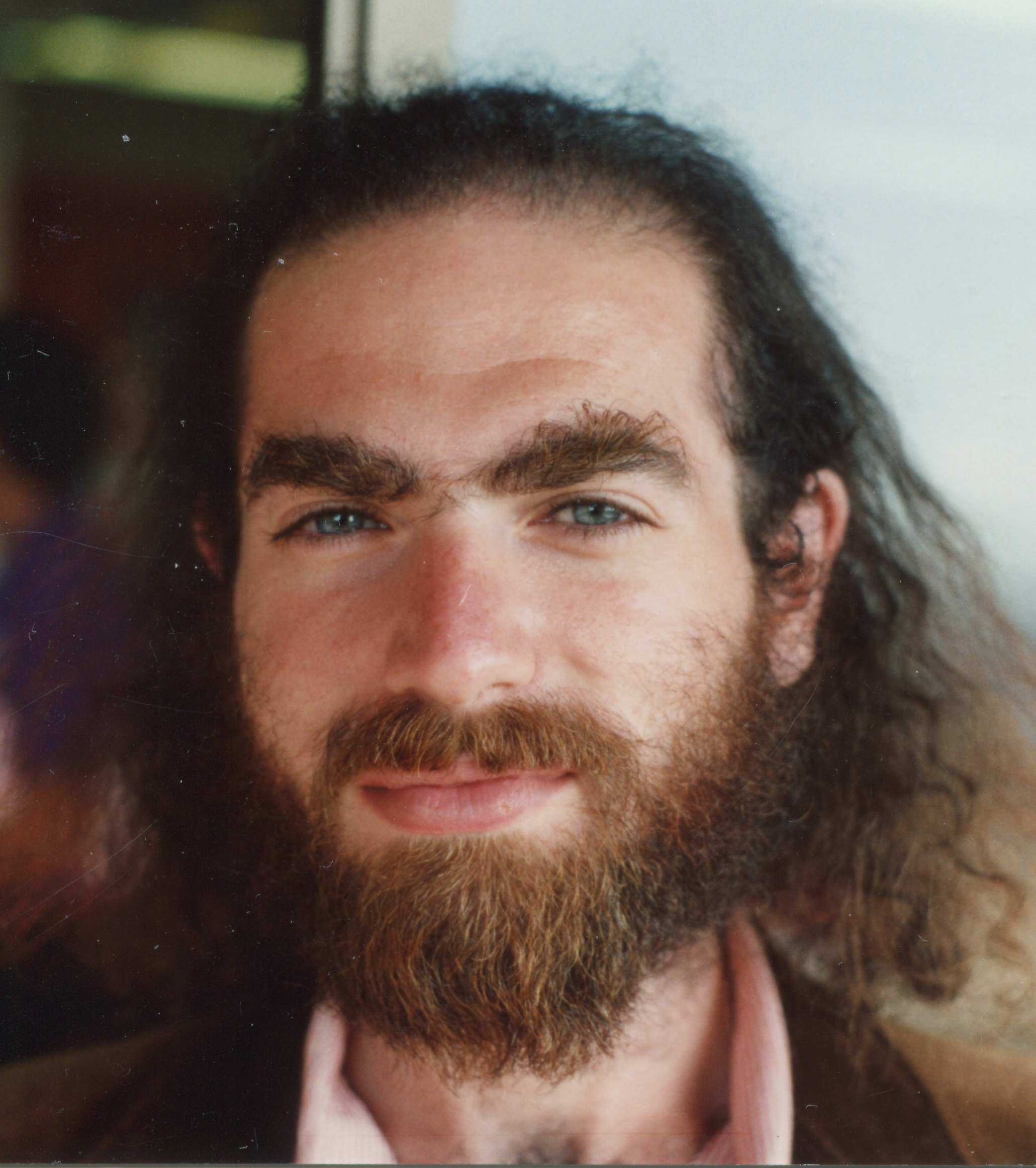
Perelman

==== Space exploration ====
Roscosmos is Russia's national space agency. The country's achievements in the field of space technology and space exploration can be traced back to Konstantin Tsiolkovsky, the father of theoretical astronautics, whose works had inspired leading Soviet rocket engineers, such as Sergey Korolyov, Valentin Glushko, and many others who contributed to the success of the Soviet space program in the early stages of the Space Race and beyond.

In 1957, the first Earth-orbiting artificial satellite, Sputnik 1, was launched. In 1961, the first human trip into space was successfully made by Yuri Gagarin. Many other Soviet and Russian space exploration records ensued. In 1963, Valentina Tereshkova became the first and youngest woman in space, having flown a solo mission on Vostok 6. In 1965, Alexei Leonov became the first human to conduct a spacewalk, exiting the space capsule during Voskhod 2.

In 1957, Laika, a Soviet space dog, became the first animal to orbit the Earth, aboard Sputnik 2. In 1966, Luna 9 became the first spacecraft to achieve a survivable landing on a celestial body, the Moon. In 1968, Zond 5 brought the first Earthlings (two tortoises and other life forms) to arrive at and circumnavigate the Moon. In 1970, Venera 7 became the first spacecraft to land on another planet, Venus. In 1971, Mars 3 became the first spacecraft to land on Mars. During the same period, Lunokhod 1 became the first space exploration rover, while Salyut 1 became the world's first space station. Russia had 176 active satellites in space in 2021, the world's third-highest.

== Lifestyle ==
=== Ethnic dress of Russian people ===
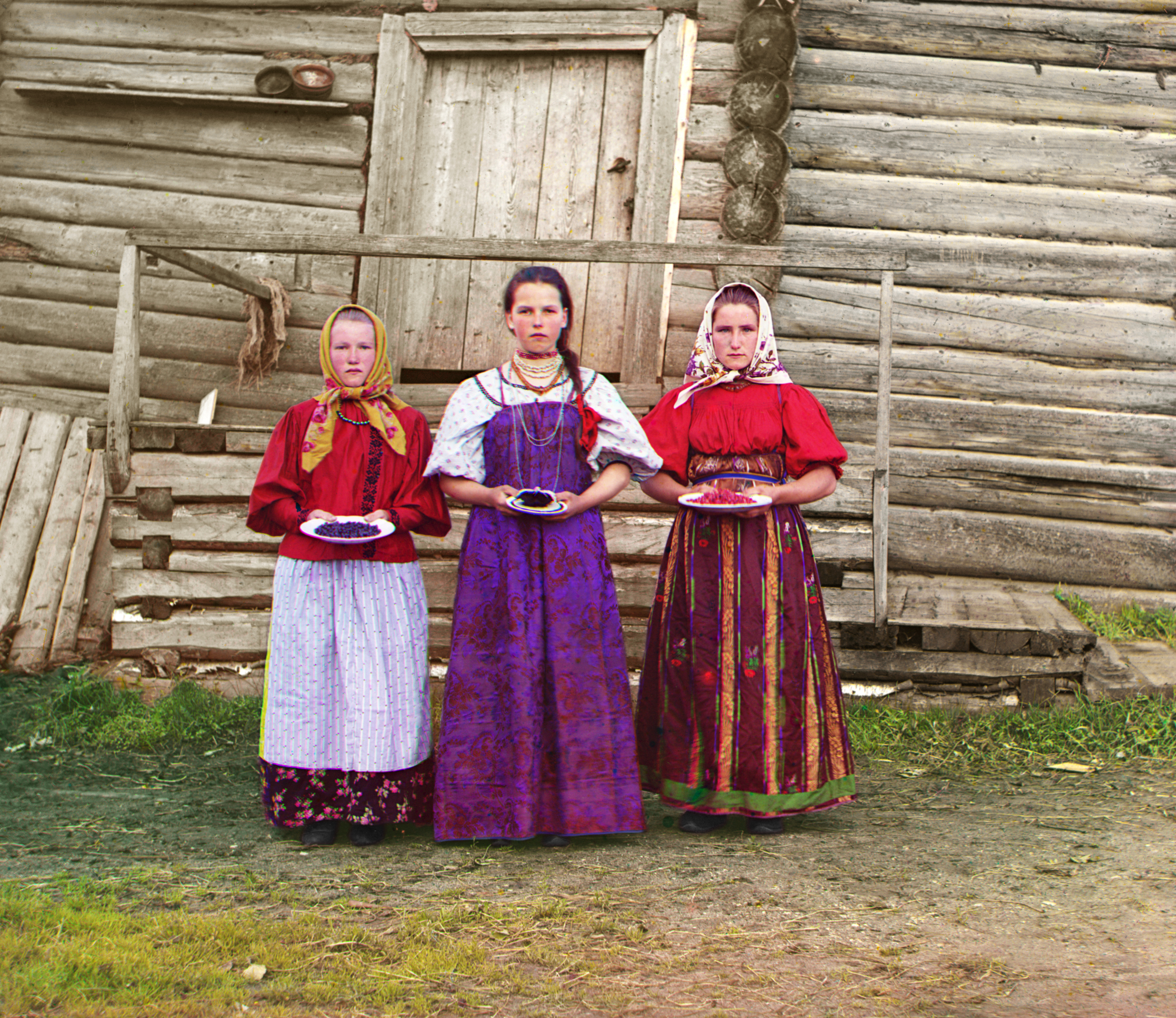
Picture of young Russian peasant women in front of traditional wooden house (ca. 1909 to 1915), taken by Prokudin-Gorskii.

Not only the minorities in Russia but the Russian culture as a whole has in the different regions of the country like in Northwest Russia, Central Russia, Southern Russia, Siberian Russia, Volga Russia, Ural Russia, Far East Russia and the Russian North Caucasus and their Oblasts own local traditions and characteristics which were developed over a long period of time through strong ethno-cultural interactions within the various groups and communities, like Slavs, Tatars and Finno-Ugrics.

Traditional Russian clothes include kaftan, a cloth which Old Russia had in common with similar robes in the Ottoman Empire, Scandinavia and Persia. Kosovorotka, which was over a long time of period a traditional holidays blouse worn by men. Ushanka for men, which design was influenced in the 17th century when in central and northern Russia a hat with earflaps called treukh was worn. Sarafan which is connected to the Middle East region and were worn in Central- and Northern regions of Old Russia. In Southern Russia burka and papaha are connected to the Cossacks which, in turn, is culturally connected to the people of the Northern Caucaus. Kokoshnik for women was primarily worn in the northern regions of Russia in the 16th to 19th centuries. Lapti and similar shoes were mostly worn by poorer members in Old Russia and northern regions where Slavic, Baltic and Finno-Ugric people lived. Valenki are traditional Russian shoes from 18th century designs which originally originated in the Great steppe, from Asian nomads. Russian traditional cloths and its elements still have a high priority in today's Russia, especially in pagan Slavic communities, folk festivals, Cossack communities, in modern fashion and Russian music ensembles.

=== Cuisine ===
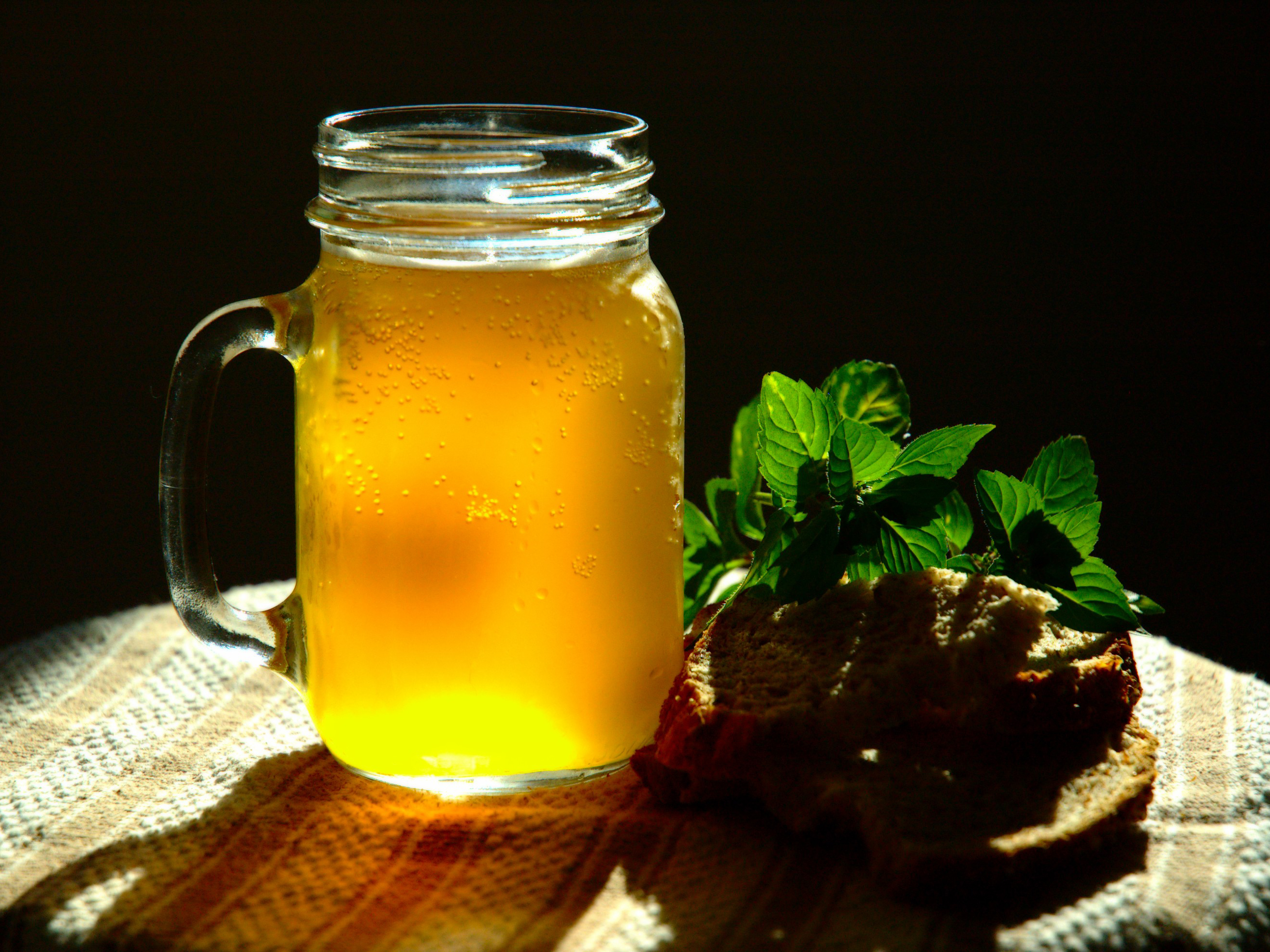
Kvass is an ancient and traditional Russian beverage.

Russian cuisine has been formed by climate, cultural and religious traditions, and the vast geography of the nation; and it shares similarities with the cuisines of its neighbouring countries. Crops of rye, wheat, barley, and millet provide the ingredients for various breads, pancakes and cereals, as well as for many drinks. Bread, of many varieties, is very popular across Russia. Flavourful soups and stews include shchi, borsch, ukha, solyanka, and okroshka. Smetana (a heavy sour cream) and mayonnaise are often added to soups and salads. Pirozhki, blini, and syrniki are native types of pancakes. Beef Stroganoff, Chicken Kiev, pelmeni, and shashlyk are popular meat dishes. Other meat dishes include stuffed cabbage rolls (golubtsy) usually filled with meat. Salads include Olivier salad, vinegret, and dressed herring.

Russia's national non-alcoholic drink is kvass, and the national alcoholic drink is vodka, which was created in the nation in the 14th century. The country has the world's highest vodka consumption, while beer is the most popular alcoholic beverage. Wine has become increasingly popular in Russia in the 21st century. Tea has also been a historically popular beverage in Russia.

=== Traditions ===
- Death in Russian traditions
- Superstitions of Russians

=== Holidays ===
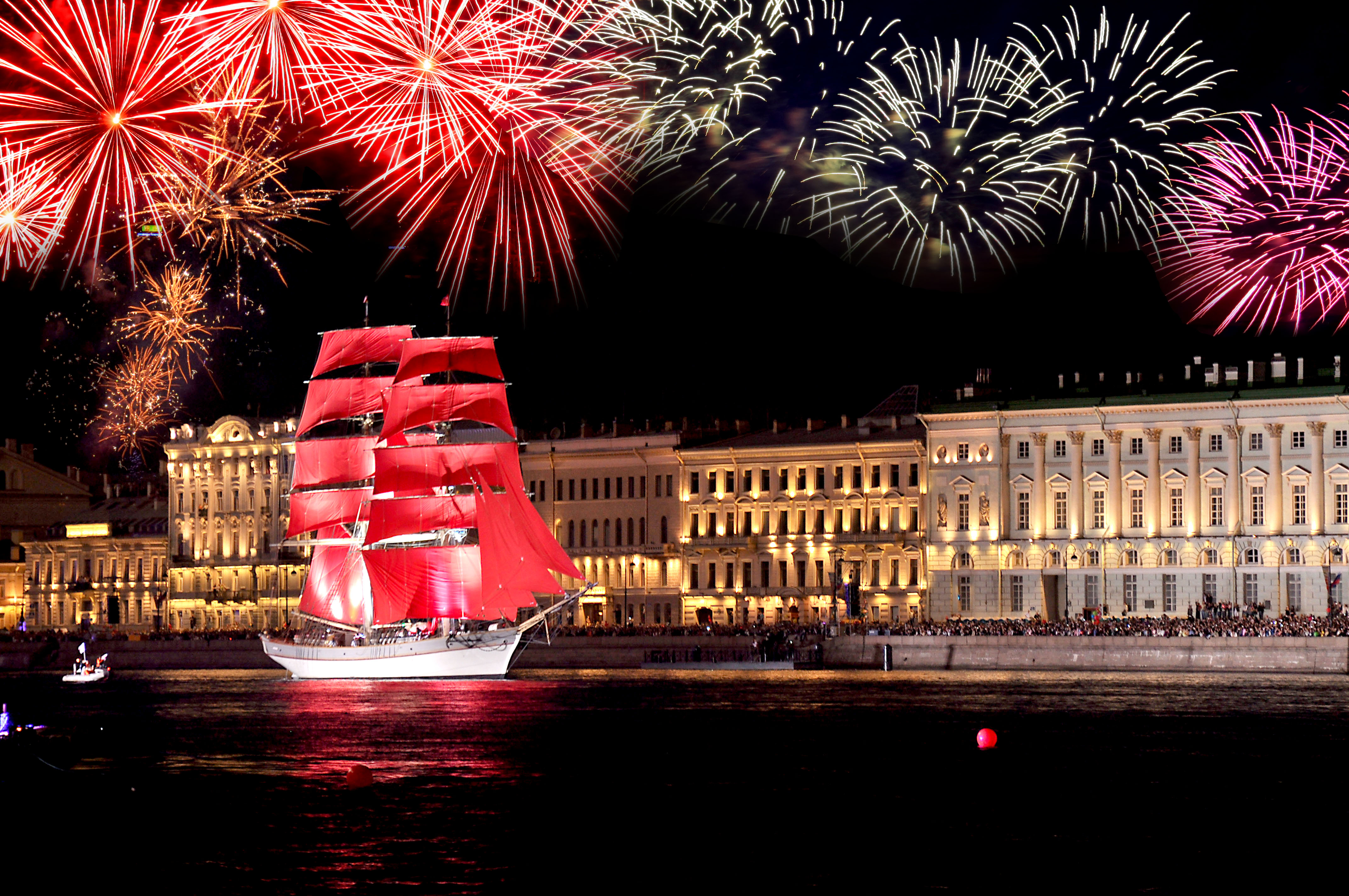
The Scarlet Sails being celebrated along the Neva in Saint Petersburg

Russia has eight, diverse—public, patriotic, and religious—official holidays. The year starts with New Year's Day on January 1, soon followed by Russian Orthodox Christmas on January 7; the two are the country's most popular holidays. Defender of the Fatherland Day, dedicated to men, is celebrated on February 23; International Women's Day, dedicated to women, on March 8; and Spring and Labor Day, originally a Soviet era holiday dedicated to workers; on May 1.

Victory Day, which honors Soviet victory over Nazi Germany and the End of World War II in Europe, is celebrated as an annual large parade in Moscow's Red Square; and marks the famous Immortal Regiment civil event. Other patriotic holidays include Russia Day on June 12, celebrated to commemorate Russia's declaration of sovereignty from the collapsing Soviet Union; and Unity Day on November 4, commemorating the uprising which marked the end of the Polish–Lithuanian occupation of Moscow.

Popular non-public holidays include Old New Year on 14 January; Tatiana Day on 25 January, dedicated to students; Maslenitsa, an ancient and popular East Slavic folk holiday; Cosmonautics Day on 12 April, in tribute to the first human trip into space; Kupala Night on 6–7 July, a traditional Slavic holiday; and Peter and Fevronia Day. Two major Christian holidays are Easter and Trinity Sunday. The Scarlet Sails is a famous public event held annually during the White Nights Festival in Saint Petersburg.

=== Religion ===
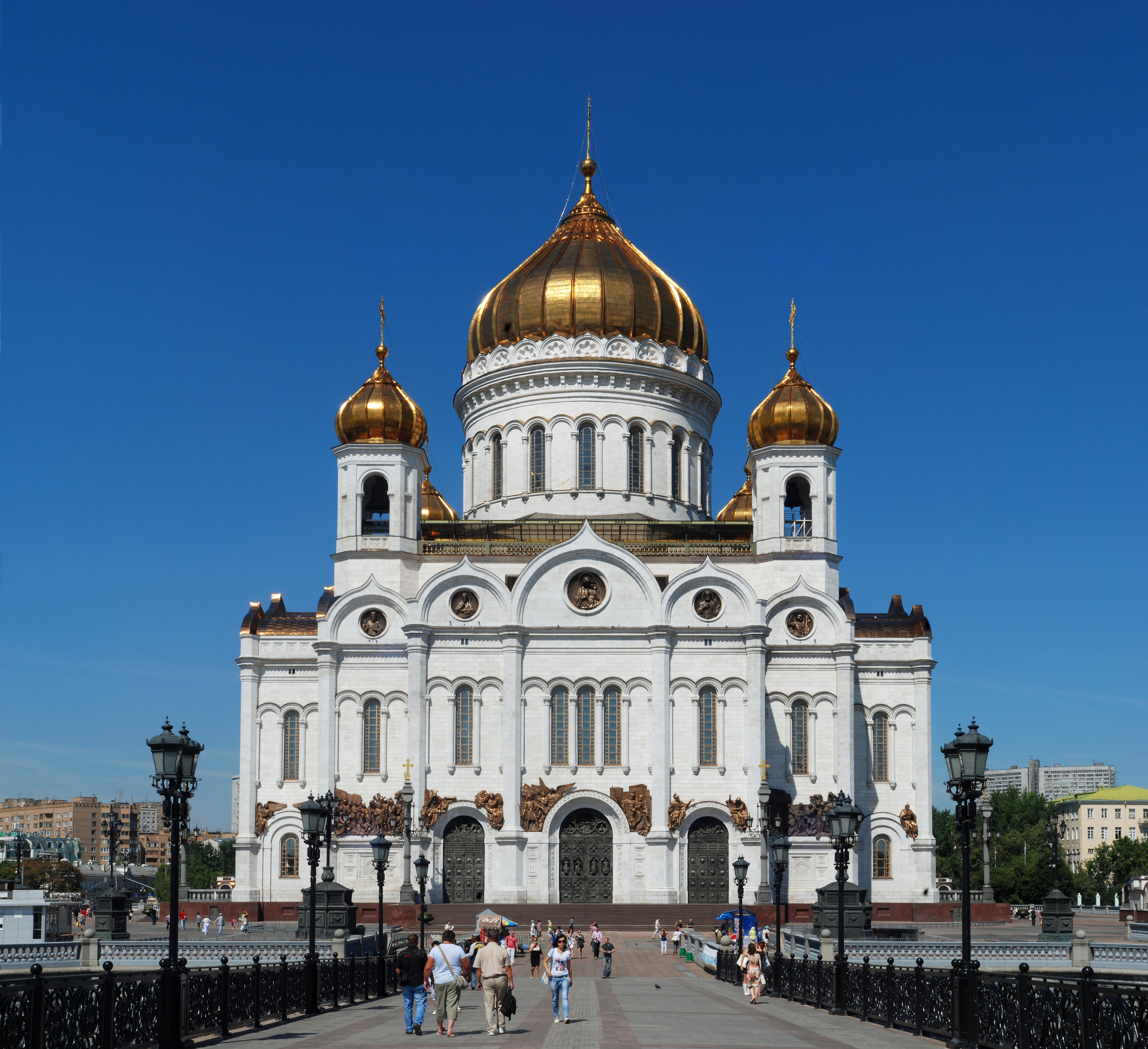
Cathedral of Christ the Saviour.

Christianity, Islam, Buddhism, and Judaism are Russia's traditional religions, deemed part of Russia's "historical heritage" in a law passed in 1997. Estimates of believers widely fluctuate among sources, and some reports put the number of non-believers in Russia as high as 48-67% of the population. Russian Orthodoxy is the dominant religion in Russia. 95% of the registered Orthodox parishes belong to the Russian Orthodox Church while there are a number of smaller Orthodox Churches. However, the vast majority of Orthodox believers do not attend church on a regular basis. Nonetheless, the church is widely respected by both believers and nonbelievers, who see it as a symbol of Russian heritage and culture. Smaller Christian denominations such as Roman Catholics, Armenian Gregorians, and various Protestants exist.

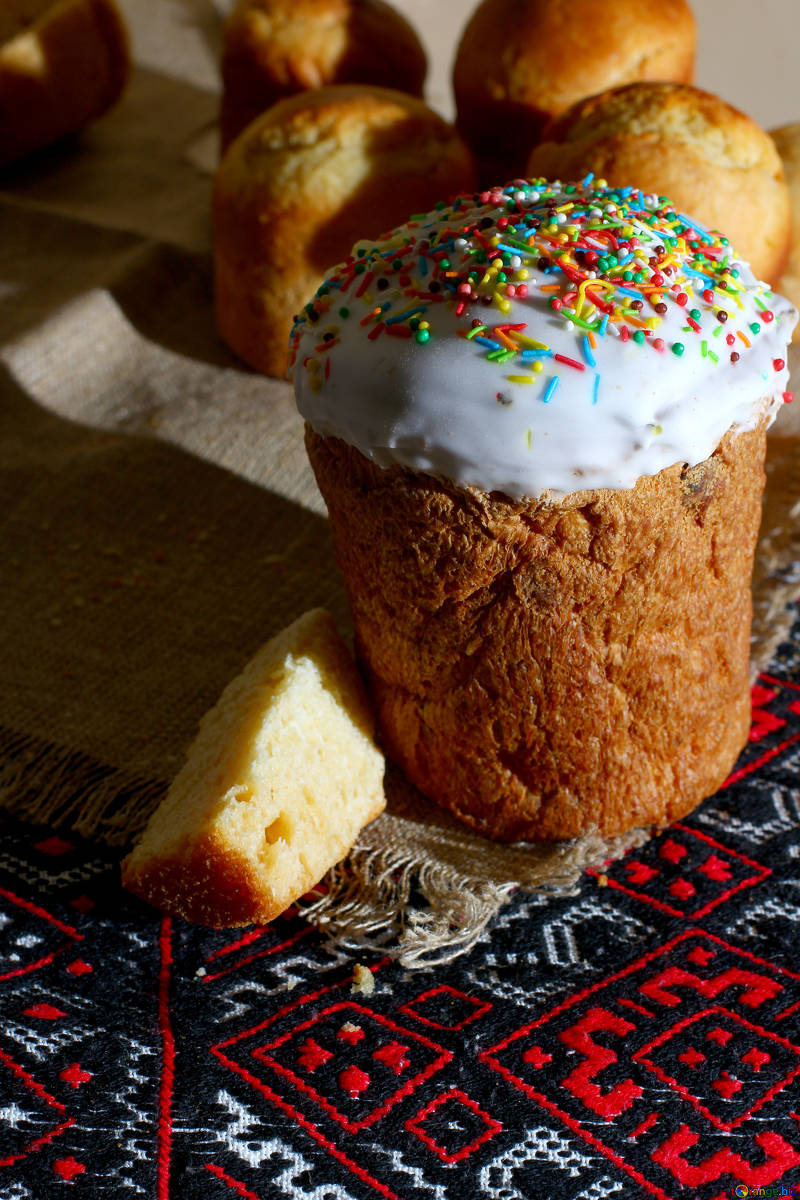
Kulich is a popular variant of Russian Easter breads called Paska

The ancestors of many of today's Russians adopted Orthodox Christianity in the 10th century. The 2007 International Religious Freedom Report published by the US Department of State said that approximately 100 million citizens consider themselves Russian Orthodox Christians. According to a poll by the Russian Public Opinion Research Center, 63% of respondents considered themselves Russian Orthodox, 6% of respondents considered themselves Muslim and less than 1% considered themselves either Buddhist, Catholic, Protestant or Jewish. Another 12% said they believe in God, but did not practice any religion, and 16% said they are non-believers.

=== Cossack culture in Russia ===
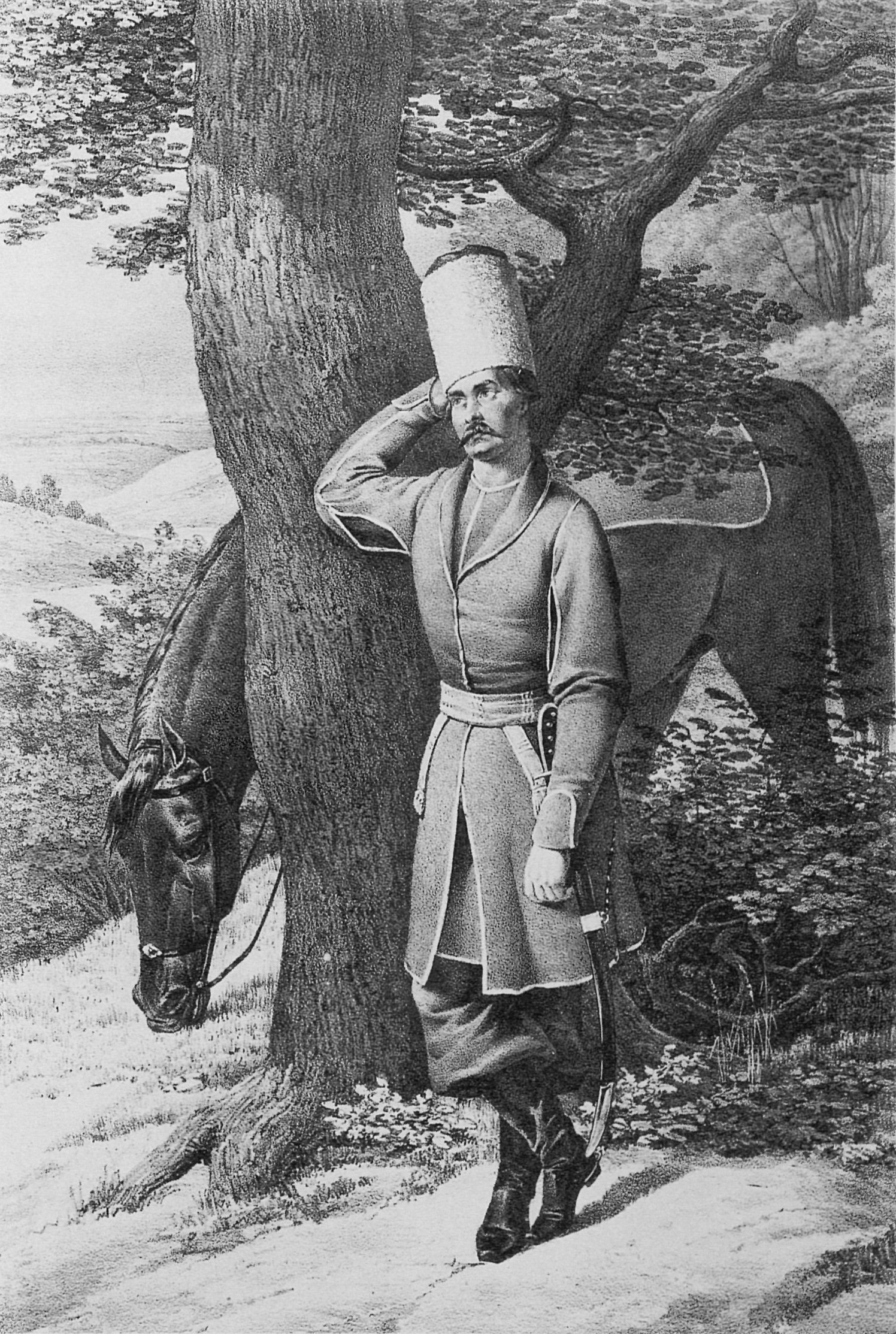
Volga Cossack in 1774. The picture is made before 1841. (Watch Russian Cossacks singing famous Russian folk song Oy, to ne vecher on YouTube)

The steppe culture of the Russian Cossacks originated from nomadic steppe people which merged with Eastern Slavic people groups into large communities. The early Cossack communities emerged in the 14th century, the first, among others, were the Don Cossacks. Other Cossack communities that have played an important role in Russia's history and culture are the Ural Cossacks, Terek Cossacks, Kuban Cossacks, Orenburg Cossacks, Volga Cossacks, Astrakhan Cossacks, Siberian Cossacks, Transbaikal Cossacks, Amur Cossacks, Ussuri Cossacks. Cossacks defended the Russian borders and expanded Russia's territory. The regions of the large Cossack communities enjoyed many freedoms in Tsarist Russia. The culture of the Cossacks became an important part of Russian culture, many Russian songs and various elements in dances and Russia's culture in general were much shaped by the Cossack communities.

=== Russian forest culture ===
The forest plays a very important role in Russia's culture and history. The forest had a great influence on the characteristics of Russian people and their cultural creations. Many myths of Russian culture are closely intertwined with the forest. Various of the early Slavic and other tribes built their houses out of wood so that the forest influenced the style of Russian architecture significantly. The handcraft Hohloma which originated in the Volga region is made out of wood and depicts numerous plants of the forest, like the berry Viburnum opulus (Russian: Калина, Kalina), flowers and leaves. Many Russian fairy tales play in the forest and fictional characters like Baba Yaga are strongly connected to Russian wood culture. The forest is also an important subject of many Russian folk songs.

=== More elements of Russian society and culture ===
Russian walking culture

Strolling or walking (Russian: гулять, gulyat') is very common in the Russian society. In contrast to many western countries strolling is very common among young people in Russia. Young people often arrange just to go for a walk. Besides the verb, the experience itself, which describes the time span of the walk, is called progulka (Russian: прогулка). Walking is so important in Russian culture that gulyat' is also a synonym for "to party".

Mushroom hunting and berry picking

Activities in the forest where people pick mushrooms and berries are very common in Russia. Mushrooms (Russian: грибы, griby) have been an important part of Russian folk culture at least since the 10th century and an essential part of Russian meals. There are more than 200 kinds of edible mushrooms in Russia. Mushrooms were always considered magical and so they play a prominent role in Russian fairy tales. The ability to identify and prepare edible mushrooms is often passed on from generation to generation. The mushroom hunting tradition is especially common in Slavic-speaking and Baltic countries. The berry (Russian: ягода, yagoda) also plays an important role in Russian folk culture and is often part of Russian craftsmanship, folk songs and national costumes. The cranberry was known in Europe for centuries as the "Russian berry". To pick mushrooms and berries in forests is a kind of meditation in Russia.

== Sports ==
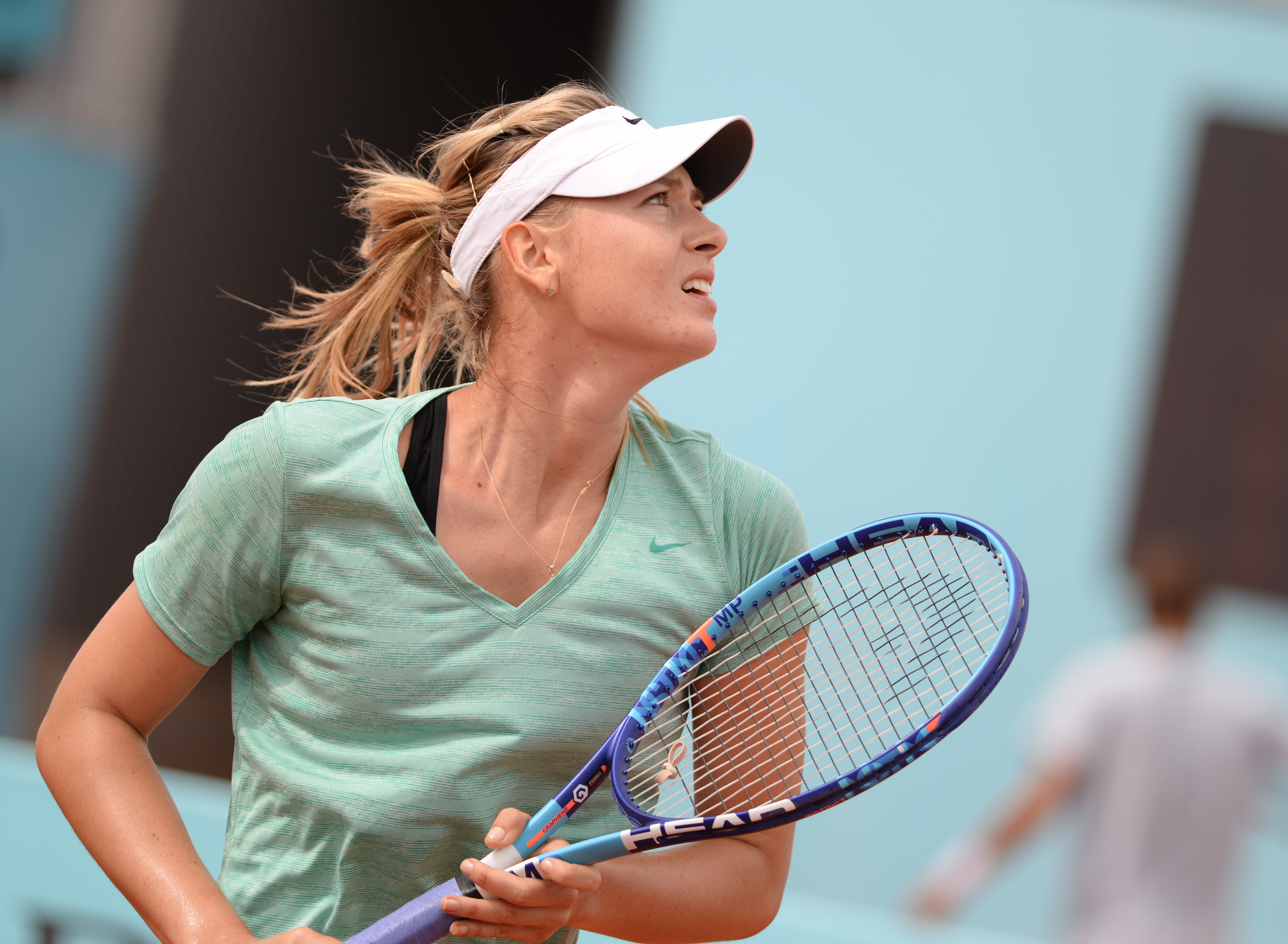
Maria Sharapova, former world No. 1 tennis player; and the world's highest-paid female athlete for 11 consecutive years.

Historically, Russian athletes have been one of the most successful contenders in the Olympic Games, ranking second in an all-time Olympic Games medal count. Russia is the leading nation in rhythmic gymnastics; and Russian synchronized swimming is considered to be the world's best. Figure skating is another popular sport in Russia, especially pair skating and ice dancing. Russia has produced a number of famous tennis players. Chess is also a widely popular pastime in the nation, with many of the world's top chess players being Russian for decades. The 1980 Summer Olympic Games were held in Moscow, and the 2014 Winter Olympics and the 2014 Winter Paralympics were hosted in Sochi.

=== Basketball ===
As the Soviet Union, Russia was traditionally very strong in basketball, winning Olympic tournaments, World Championships and Eurobasket. As of 2009 they have various players in the NBA, notably Utah Jazz forward Andrei Kirilenko, and are considered as a worldwide basketball force. In 2007, Russia defeated world champions Spain to win Eurobasket 2007. Russian basketball clubs such as PBC CSKA Moscow (numerous Euroleague Champions) have also had great success in European competitions such as the Euroleague and the ULEB Cup.

=== Ice hockey ===
Although ice hockey was only introduced during the Soviet era, the national team soon dominated the sport internationally, winning gold at seven of the nine Olympics and 19 of the 30 World Championships they contested between 1954 and 1991. Russian players Valeri Kharlamov, Sergei Makarov, Viacheslav Fetisov and Vladislav Tretiak hold four of the six positions on the IIHF Team of the Century. As with some other sports, the Russian ice hockey programme suffered after the breakup of the Soviet Union, with Russia enduring a 15-year gold medal drought. At that time many prominent Russian players made their careers in the National Hockey League (NHL). In recent years Russia has reemerged as a hockey power, winning back to back gold medals in the 2008 and 2009 World Championships, and overtaking Team Canada as the top ranked ice hockey team in the world, but then lost to Canada in the quarter-finals of the 2010 Olympics and 2010 World Junior Championship. The Kontinental Hockey League (KHL) was founded in 2008 as a rival of the NHL.

=== Bandy ===
Bandy, known in Russian as "hockey with a ball" and sometimes informally as "Russian hockey" (as opposed to "Canadian hockey", an informal name for ice hockey), is another traditionally popular ice sport, with national league games averaging around 3,500 spectators. It's considered a national sport. The Soviet Union national bandy team won all the Bandy World Championships from 1957 to 1979. The Russian team is the reigning world champion since the 2014 tournament, having defended the title in 2015.

=== Football ===
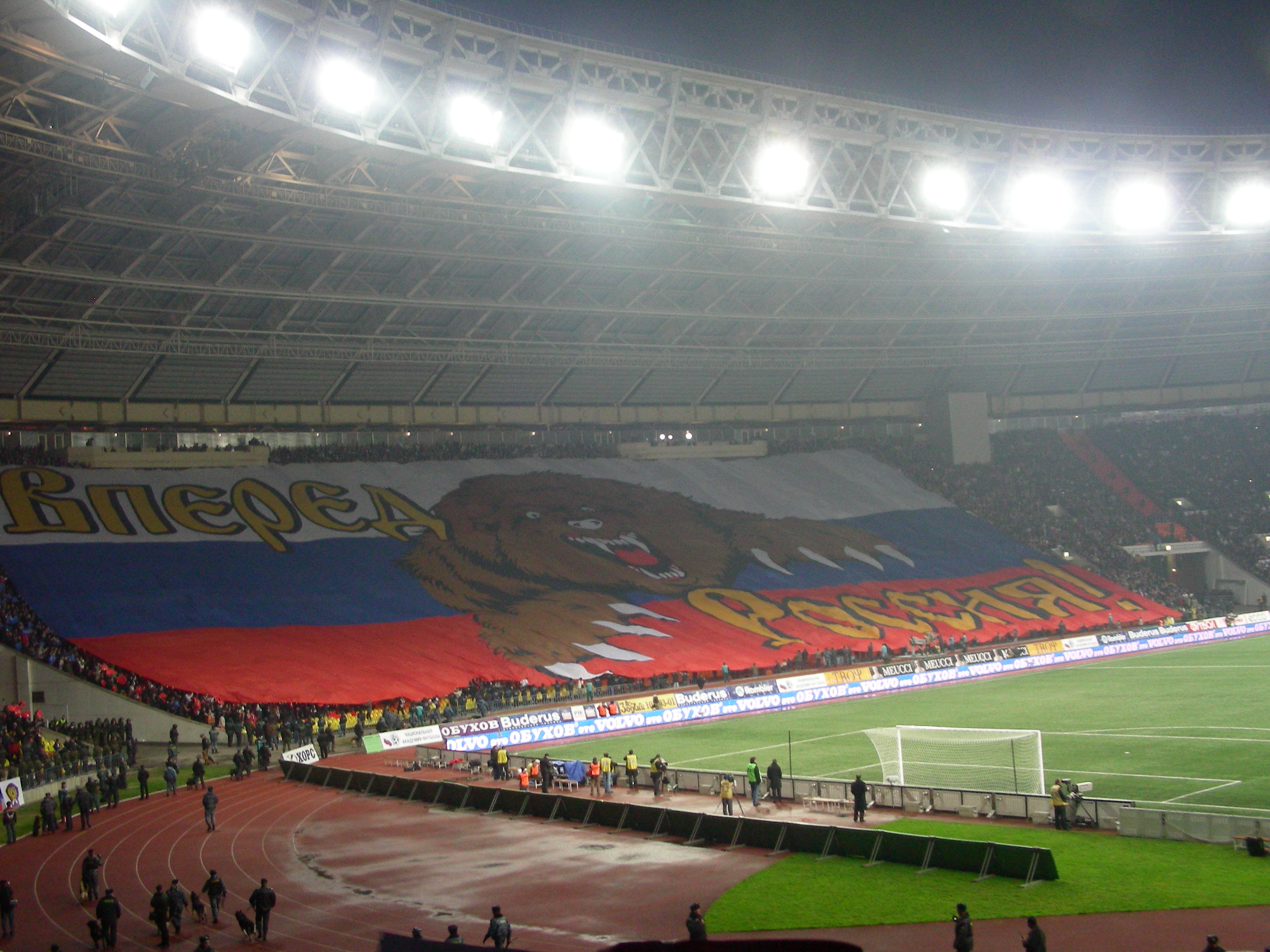
Russian football fans with a gigantic Go Russia! banner, featuring Russian Bear on the background of the Russian flag.

Football is the most popular sport in Russia. The Soviet Union national football team became the first European champions by winning Euro 1960, and reached the finals of Euro 1988. In 1956 and 1988, the Soviet Union won gold at the Olympic football tournament. Russian clubs CSKA Moscow and Zenit Saint Petersburg won the UEFA Cup in 2005 and 2008. The Russian national football team reached the semi-finals of Euro 2008. Russia was the host nation for the 2017 FIFA Confederations Cup, and the 2018 FIFA World Cup.

=== Martial arts ===
Russia has an extensive history of martial arts. Some of its best-known forms include the fistfight, Sambo, and Systema with its derivatives Ryabko's Systema and Retuinskih's System ROSS. Undefeated lightweight UFC champion Khabib Nurmagomedov is from Makhachkala and was called by President Vladimir Putin following his victory over Conor McGregor.

== National symbols ==
=== State symbols ===
State symbols of Russia include the Byzantine double-headed eagle, combined with St. George of Moscow in the Russian coat of arms; these symbols date from the time of the Grand Duchy of Moscow. The Russian flag appeared in the late Tsardom of Russia period and became widely used during the era of the Russian Empire. The current Russian national anthem shares its music with the Soviet Anthem, though not the lyrics (many Russians of older generations don't know the new lyrics and sing the old ones). The Russian imperial motto God is with us and the Soviet motto Proletarians of all countries, unite! are now obsolete and no new motto has been officially introduced to replace them. The Hammer and sickle and the full Soviet coat of arms are still widely seen in Russian cities as a part of old architectural decorations. Soviet Red Stars are also encountered, often on military equipment and war memorials. The Soviet Red Banner is still honored, especially the Banner of Victory of 1945.

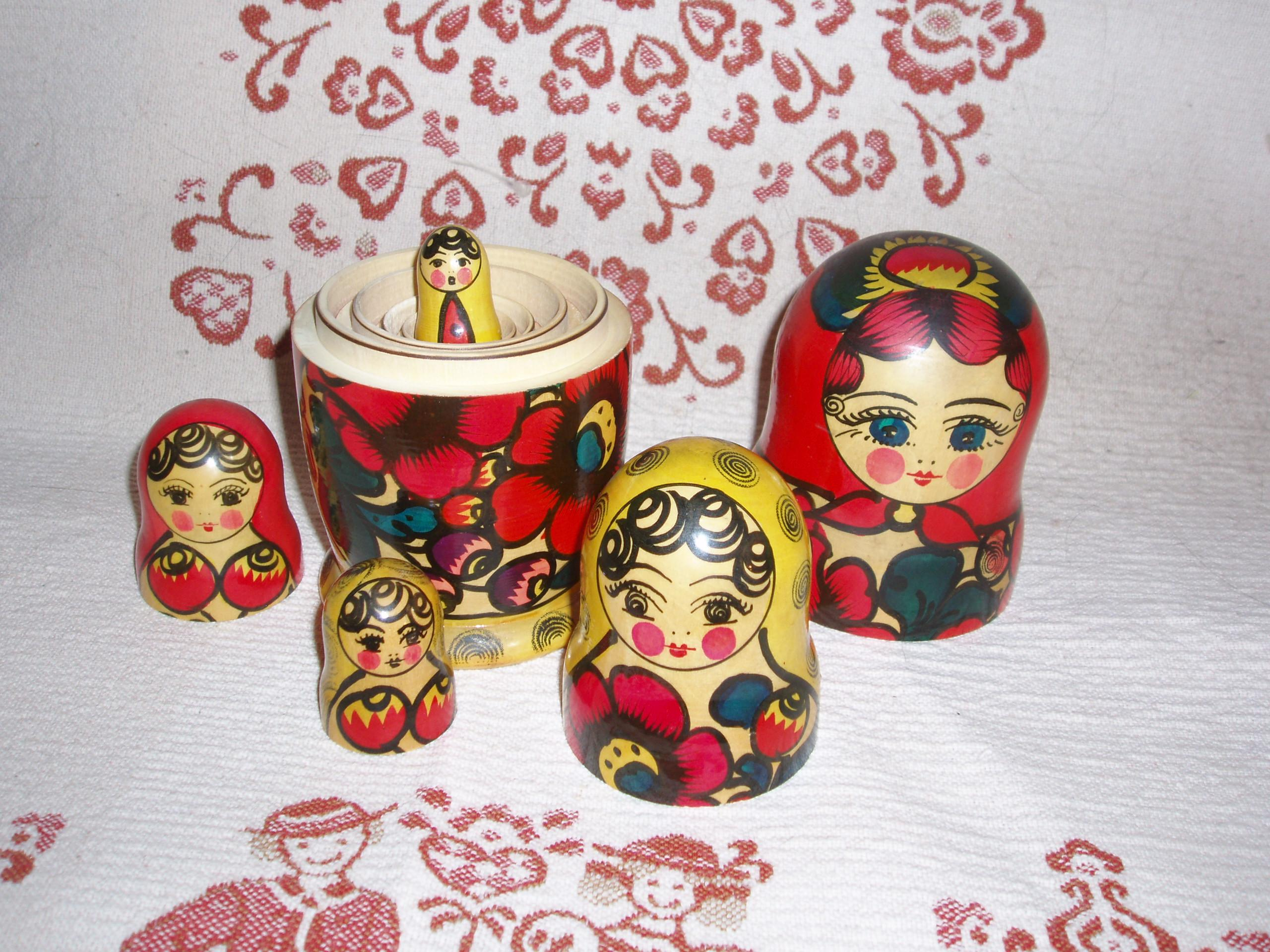
Dissected Matryoshka doll

=== Unofficial symbols ===
The Matryoshka doll is a recognizable symbol of Russia, while the towers of Moscow Kremlin and Saint Basil's Cathedral in Moscow are main Russia's architectural symbols. Cheburashka is a mascot of Russian national Olympic team. Mary, Saint Nicholas, Saint Andrew, Saint George, Saint Alexander Nevsky, Saint Sergius of Radonezh, Saint Seraphim of Sarov are Russia's patron saints. Chamomile is a flower that Russians often associate with their Motherland, while birch is a national tree. The Russian bear is an animal often associated with Russia, though this image has Western origins and Russians themselves do not consider it as a special symbol. The native Russian national personification is "Родина мать" Mother Motherland (the statue of it located on the Mamay hill "Мамаев курган" in Volgograd /former Stalingrad/), called Mother Russia at the West. In Russia another state symbol would be White or Silver Birch Trees or chamomile. Chamomile can be found in most places of Russia but is mostly found in the forests. Finding a chamomile can be a good sign in Russia and you could also make a headband out of it called a venok. Mostly young girls will sit outside with their friends in poorer regions and make them. You can make them out of any flower and keep them hanging in the house or wear it when outside.

== Tourism ==
Tourism in Russia has seen rapid growth since the late Soviet times, first domestic tourism and then international tourism as well. Rich cultural heritage and great natural variety place Russia among the most popular tourist destinations in the world. The country contains 29 UNESCO World Heritage Sites, while many more are on UNESCO's tentative lists. Major tourist routes in Russia include a travel around the Golden Ring of ancient cities, cruises on rivers like the Volga, and long journeys on the Trans-Siberian Railway. Diverse regions and ethnic cultures of Russia offer many different food and souvenirs, and show a great variety of traditions, like Russian banya, Tatar Sabantuy, or Siberian shamanist rituals.

=== Cultural tourism ===
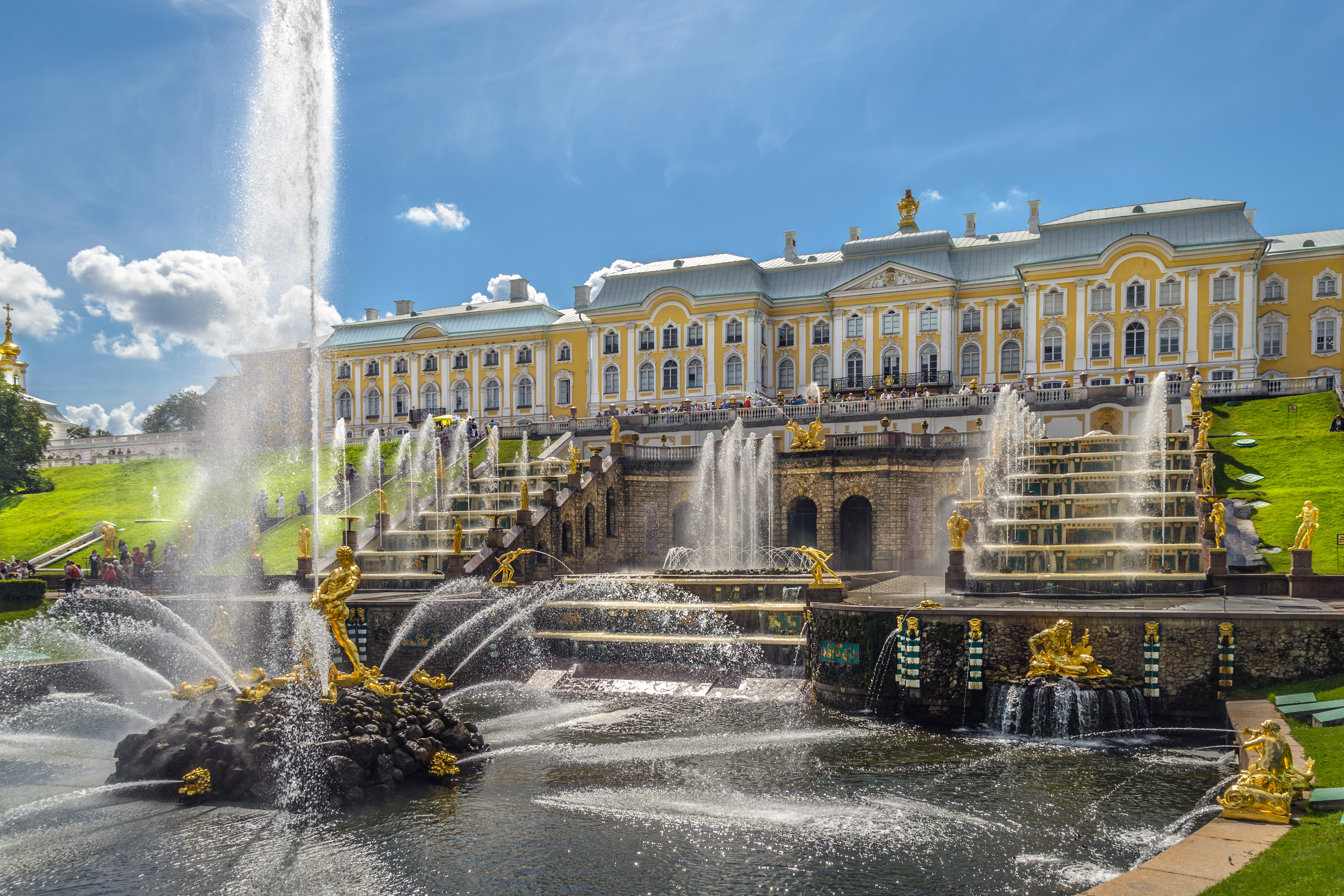
Grand Cascade in Peterhof Palace, nicknamed Russian Versailles, a popular tourist destination in Saint Petersburg.

Some popular tourist destinations in Russia are Moscow and Saint Petersburg, the current and the former capitals of the country and great cultural centers, recognized as World Cities. Moscow and Saint Petersburg feature museums such as Tretyakov Gallery and Hermitage, and theaters like Bolshoi and Mariinsky. Architectural points of interest include churches like Saint Basil's Cathedral, Cathedral of Christ the Saviour, Saint Isaac's Cathedral and Church of the Savior on Blood, fortifications like Moscow Kremlin and Peter and Paul Fortress, public squares like Red Square and Palace Square, and streets like Tverskaya and Nevsky Prospect. Palaces and parks are found in the former imperial residences in suburbs of Moscow (Kolomenskoye, Tsaritsyno) and Saint Petersburg (Peterhof, Strelna, Oranienbaum, Gatchina, Pavlovsk Palace, Tsarskoye Selo). Moscow contains a great variety Soviet-era buildings along with modern skyscrapers, while Saint Petersburg, nicknamed Venice of the North, boasts of its classical architecture, many rivers, channels and bridges.

Kazan, the capital of Tatarstan, shows a mix of Christian Russian and Muslim Tatar cultures. The city has registered a brand The Third Capital of Russia. Veliky Novgorod, Pskov and the cities of Golden Ring (Vladimir, Yaroslavl, Kostroma and others) have at best preserved the architecture and the spirit of ancient and medieval Rus', and also are among the main tourist destinations. Many old fortifications (typically Kremlins), monasteries and churches are scattered throughout Russia, forming its unique cultural landscape both in big cities and in remote areas.

=== Resorts and nature tourism ===
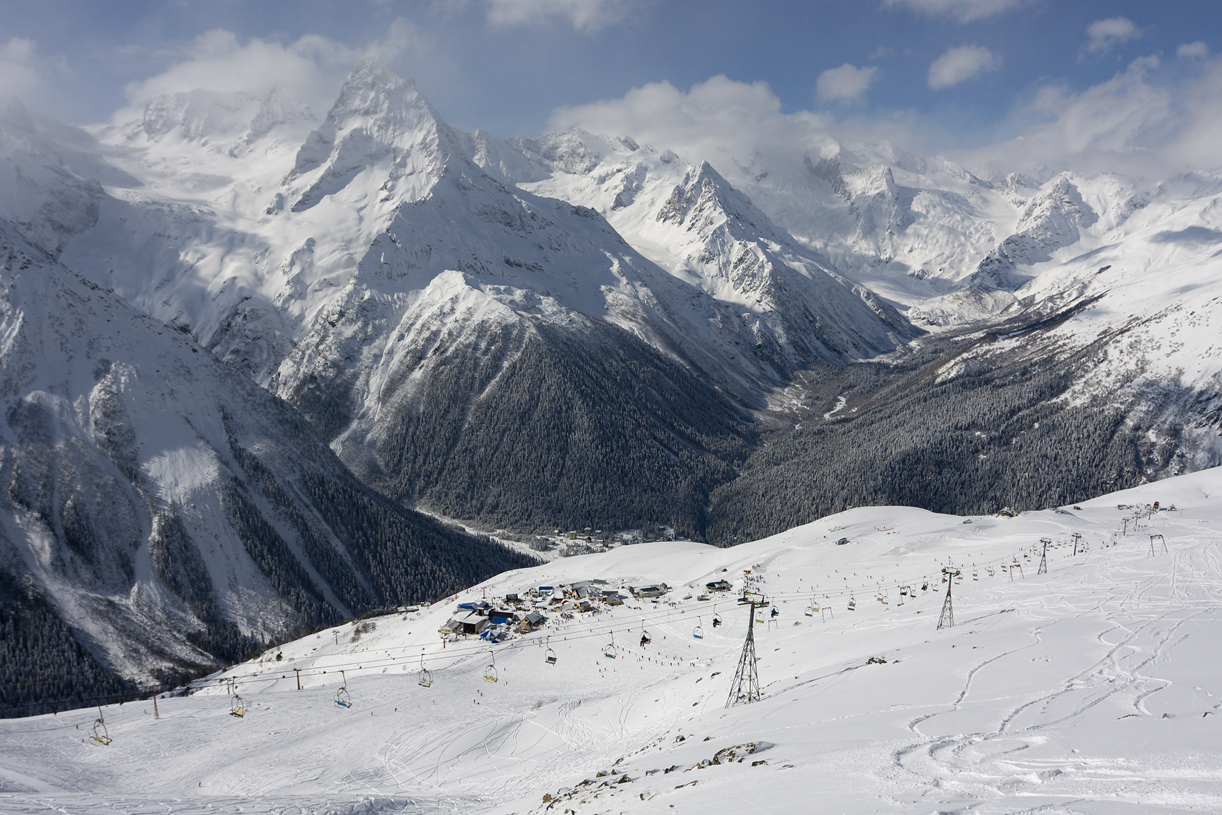
The ski resort at Dombay, Western Caucasus.

The warm subtropical Black Sea coast of Russia is the site for a number of popular sea resorts, like Sochi, known for its beaches and nature. Sochi also contains a number of major ski resorts, like Krasnaya Polyana; the city is the host of 2014 Winter Olympics and the 2014 Winter Paralympics. The mountains of the Northern Caucasus contain many other popular ski resorts, like Dombay in Karachay–Cherkessia.

The most famous natural tourist destination in Russia is Lake Baikal, named the Blue Eye of Siberia. This unique lake, oldest and deepest in the world, has crystal-clean waters and is surrounded by taiga-covered mountains.

Other popular natural destinations include Kamchatka with its volcanoes and geysers, Karelia with its many lakes and granite rocks, Altai with its snowy mountains and Tyva with its wild steppes.

== See also ==
- Slavs: East Slavs
- Material culture in Russia
- List of Russian people
- List of museums in Russia
- List of Russian-language poets
- List of Russian-language novelists
- List of Russian-language playwrights
- Culture of the Soviet Union
- Culture of Tatarstan
- Culture of the Russian Armed Forces
