= List of castles in Russia =

This is a list of castles in Russia.

== Northwestern Federal District ==
| Name | Russian name | Location | Date | Picture |
|---|---|---|---|---|
| Alexander-Svirsky Monastery | Александро-Свирский монастырь | Leningrad Oblast | 15th century | |
| Balga Castle | Замок Бальга | Kaliningrad Oblast | 1239 | |
| Brandenburg Castle | Замок Браденбург | Kaliningrad Oblast | 13th century | |
| Gdov Kremlin | Гдовский кремль | Pskov Oblast | 1431-1434 | |
| Goritsky Monastery | Горицкий Воскресенский монастырь | Vologda Oblast | 1514-1832 | |
| Ferapontov Monastery | Ферапонтов монастырь | Vologda Oblast | 1397-1798 | |
| Ivangorod Fortress | Ивангородская крепость | Leningrad Oblast | 1492 | |
| Izborsk Fortress | Изборская крепость | Pskov Oblast | 14th century | |
| Königsberg Castle | Кенигсбергский замок | Kaliningrad Oblast | 1255-1713 | |
| Khutyn Monastery | Хутынский монастырь | Novgorod Oblast | 1190-1646 | |
| Konevsky Monastery | Коневский монастырь | Leningrad Oblast | 1393-1812 | |
| Koporye Kremlin | Крепость Копорье | Leningrad Oblast | 1237 | |
| Korela Fortress | Крепость Корела | Leningrad Oblast | 1310 | |
| Kronstadt Fortress | Кронштадская крепость | St. Petersburg | 1704-1950 | |
| Mirozhsky Monastery | Мирожский монастырь | Pskov Oblast | 1156-1805 | |
| Novgorod Kremlin | Новгородский кремль | Novgorod Oblast | 11th-14th century | |
| Oreshek Fortress | Крепость Орешек | Leningrad Oblast | 1323-18th century | |
| Peter and Paul Fortress | Петропавловская крепость | St. Petersburg | 1703-1907 | |
| Porkhov Fortress | Порховская крепость | Pskov Oblast | 1387 | |
| Pskov Kremlin | Псковский кремль (кром) | Pskov Oblast | 11th-16th century | |
| Pskovo-Pechersky Monastery | Псково-Печерский монастырь | Pskov Oblast | 1473-1595 | |
| Ragnit Castle | Замок Рагнит | Kaliningrad Oblast | 1289 | |
| Saint Michael's Castle | Михайловский (Инженерный) замок | Saint Petersburg | 1797-1801 | |
| Schaaken Castle | Замок Шаакен | Kaliningrad Oblast | c. 1270 | |
| Solovetsky Monastery | Соловецкий монастырь | Arkhangelsk Oblast | 1436-1834 | |
| Staraya Ladoga Fortress | Староладожская крепость | Leningrad Oblast | 1116 | |
| Vologda Kremlin | Вологодский кремль | Vologda Oblast | 1567 | |
| Vyborg Castle | Выборгский замок | Leningrad Oblast | 1293-1564; 1834-1894 | |
| Yuriev Monastery | Юрьев монастырь | Novgorod Oblast | 1119-1836 | |

== Central Federal District ==
| Name | Russian name | Location | Date | Picture |
|---|---|---|---|---|
| Alexandrov Kremlin | Александровский кремль | Vladimir Oblast | 14th-16th century | |
| Saints Boris and Gleb Monastery | Борисоглебский монастырь | Yaroslavl Oblast | 1585-1591 | |
| Donskoy Monastery | Донской монастырь | Moscow | 1591-2000 | |
| Goritsky Monastery | Горицкий монастырь | Yaroslavl Oblast | 14th century-1774 | |
| Ipatiev Monastery | Ипатьевский монастырь | Kostroma Oblast | 1432-1840 | |
| Joseph-Volokolamsk Monastery | Иосифо-Волокский монастырь | Moscow Oblast | 1479-1696 | |
| Kolomna Kremlin | Коломенский кремль | Moscow Oblast | 1525-1531 | |
| Meyendorff Castle | Замок Майендорф | Moscow Oblast | 1874-1885 | |
| Monastery of Saint Euthymius | Спасо-Евфимиев монастырь | Vladimir Oblast | 1352-1669 | |
| Moscow Kremlin | Московский кремль | Moscow | 1482-1495 | |
| Mozhaysk Kremlin | Можайский кремль | Moscow Oblast | 1624-1626 | |
| New Jerusalem Monastery | Новоиерусалимский монастырь | Moscow Oblast | 1656-1697 | |
| Rostov Veliky Kremlin | Ростовский кремль | Yaroslavl Oblast | 1670-1683 | |
| Ryazan Kremlin | Рязанский кремль | Ryazan Oblast | 12th-19th century | |
| Serpukhov Kremlin | Серпуховский кремль | Moscow Oblast | 1556 | |
| Smolensk Kremlin | Смоленский кремль | Smolensk Oblast | 1595-1602 | |
| Spaso-Yakovlevsky Monastery | Спасо-Яковлевский монастырь | Yaroslavl Oblast | 1389-1836 | |
| Stolobny Island | Нило-Столобенская пустынь | Tver Oblast | 1594-1833 | |
| Suzdal Kremlin | Суздальский кремль | Vladimir Oblast | 1024-1719 | |
| Trinity Lavra of St. Sergius | Троице-Сергиева лавра | Moscow Oblast | 1337-1892 | |
| Vasilievskoe Castle | Замок Васильевское | Moscow Oblast | 1881-1884 | |
| Volokolamsk Kremlin | Волоколамский кремль | Moscow Oblast | 15-19th century | |
| Vyazma Kremlin | Вязьменский кремль | Smolensk Oblast | 17th century | |
| Vysotsky Monastery | Высоцкий монастырь | Moscow Oblast | 1374-1840 | |
| Yaroslavl Kremlin | Ярославский кремль | Yaroslavl Oblast | XII-1838 | |
| Zaraysk Kremlin | Зарайский кремль | Moscow Oblast | 1528-1531 | |

== Volga Federal District ==
| Name | Russian name | Location | Date | Picture |
|---|---|---|---|---|
| Kazan Kremlin | Казанский кремль | Tatarstan | 1672 | |
| Nizhny Novgorod Kremlin | Нижегородский кремль | Nizhny Novgorod Oblast | 1500-1515 | |
| Syzran Kremlin | Сызраньский кремль | Samara Oblast | 1683 | |

== Other Districts ==
| Name | Russian name | Location | Date | Picture |
|---|---|---|---|---|
| Astrakhan Kremlin | Астраханский кремль | Astrakhan Oblast | 1580-1807 | |
| Naryn Kala Castle | Дербентская цитадель | Dagestan | 2nd-17th century | |
| Tobolsk Kremlin | Тобольский кремль | Tyumen Oblast | 1683-1799 | |

== See also ==
- List of castles
