= Suzdal =

Town in Vladimir Oblast, Russia

Suzdal Суздаль
- Town
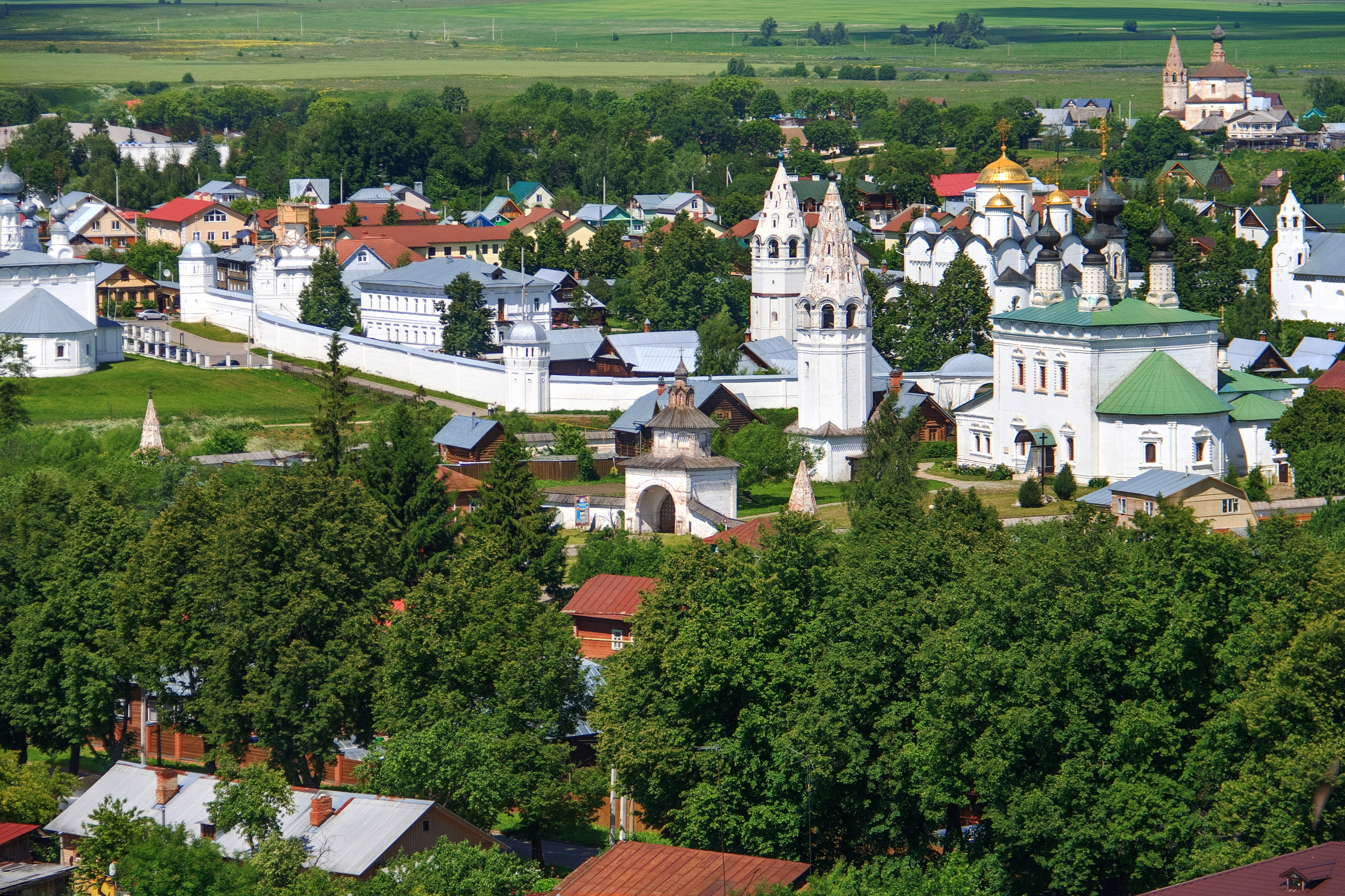

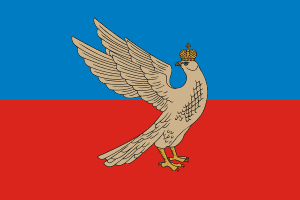
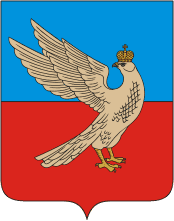
- Flag Coat of arms
- Interactive map of Suzdal
- Location of Suzdal Suzdal (Vladimir Oblast)
- Coordinates: 56°25′N 40°27′E
- Country: Russia
- Federal subject: Vladimir Oblast
- Administrative district: Suzdalsky District
- Founded: 1024

Government
  - Head of Town: Larisa Majorova

Area
  - Total: 15 km^{2} (5.8 sq mi)
- Elevation: 115 m (377 ft)

Population (2010 Census)
  - Total: 10,535
  - Estimate (2015): 9,978 (−5.3%)
  - Density: 700/km^{2} (1,800/sq mi)

Administrative status
  - Capital of: Suzdalsky District

Municipal status
  - Municipal district: Suzdalsky Municipal District
  - Urban settlement: Suzdal Urban Settlement
  - Capital of: Suzdalsky Municipal District, Suzdal Urban Settlement
- Time zone: UTC+3 (MSK)
- Postal codes: 601291, 601293
- Dialing code: +7 49231
- OKTMO ID: 17654101001
- Town Day: 2nd Saturday of August
- Website: www.gorodsuzdal.ru

Suzdal population
- 2021 Census: 9,286
- 2010 Census: 10,535
- 2002 Census: 11,357
- 1989 Census: 12,063
- 1979 Census: 11,529

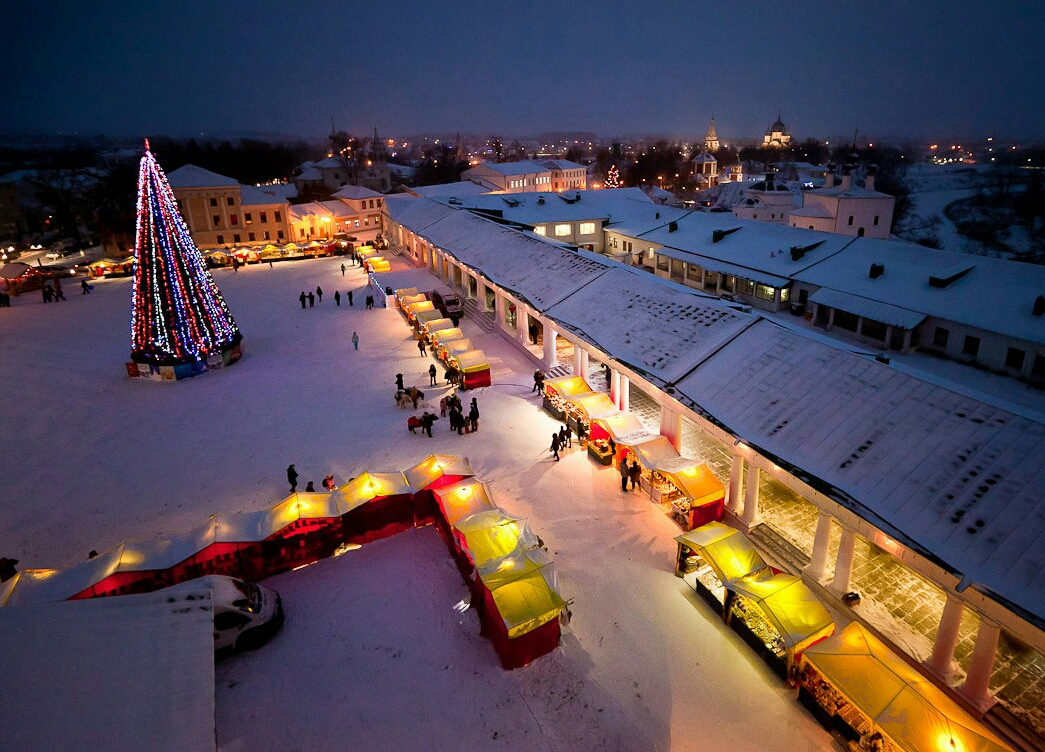
Christmas in Suzdal

Suzdal (Russian: Суздаль, IPA: [ˈsuzdəlʲ]) is a town that serves as the administrative center of Suzdalsky District in Vladimir Oblast, Russia. It is located along the Kamenka, a tributary of the Nerl River, 26 km (16 mi) north of the city of Vladimir. As of the 2021 census, its population was 9,286.

In the early 12th century, Suzdal became the capital of the Rostov-Suzdal principality, which evolved into Vladimir-Suzdal and later Moscow as a major Russian principality, forming the nucleus of the modern Russian state.

Suzdal is the smallest of Russia's Golden Ring of historic towns. It has several sites listed as UNESCO World Heritage Sites.

== Etymology ==
The town is first mentioned in Russian chronicles under the year 1024 in the form Suzhdalĭ (Суждаль). From the 11th century onward, the form Suzdalĭ came into use, initially sporadically and later with increasing frequency. The name is thought to be based on the verb sŭzĭdati (Old Russian: съзьдати; Modern Russian: создать, romanized: sozdat'), which originally meant 'to make from clay'.

The name of the town could be interpreted as 'made from clay', that is, 'rammed-earth' or 'brick-built', although it is more likely that the verb first gave rise to a personal name or nickname of an individual, presumably a potter or bricklayer, and that the settlement was subsequently named after him. This possibility is supported by the existence of the Old Russian personal name Suzdal (Суздал), from which Suzdalĭ is the possessive form, with -ь marking possession.

== History ==
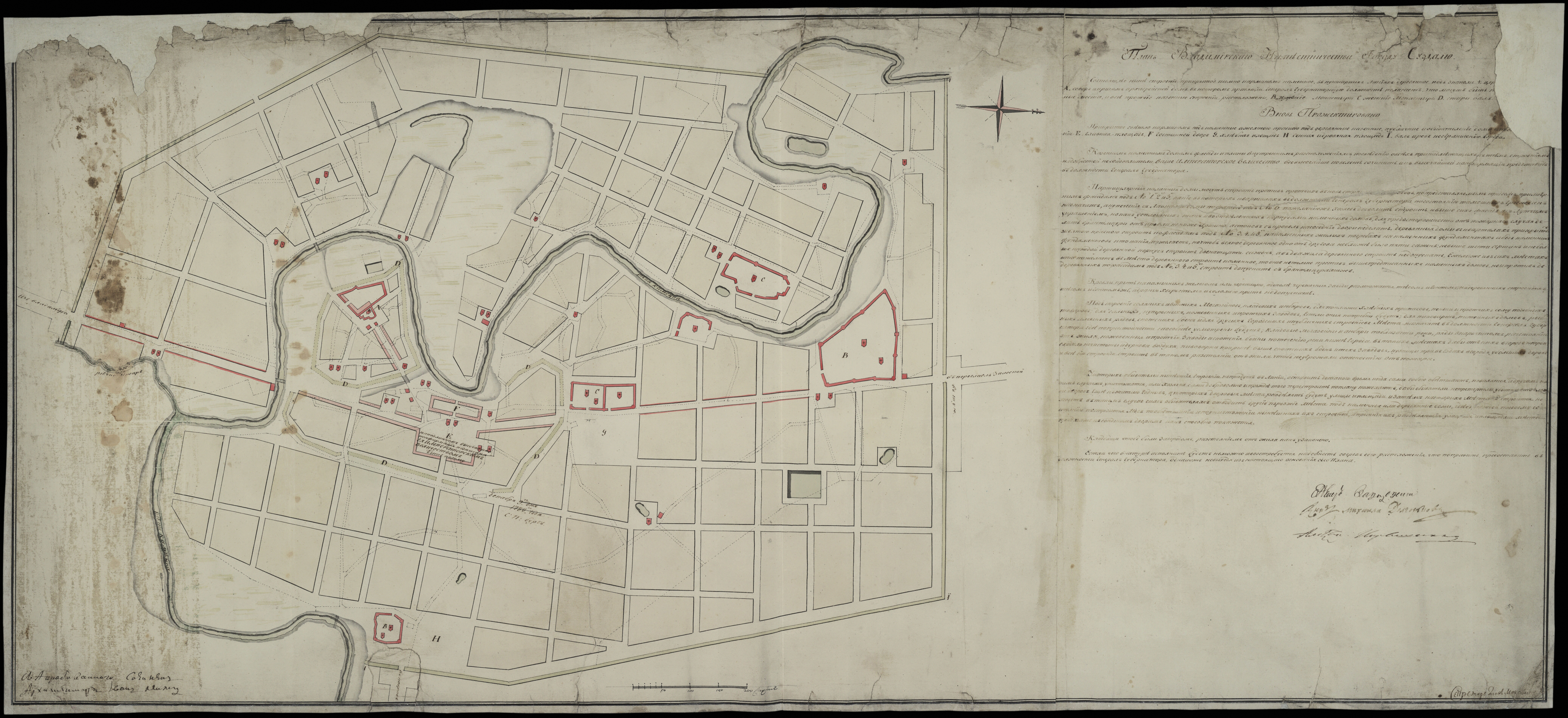
Plan of Suzdal, 1788

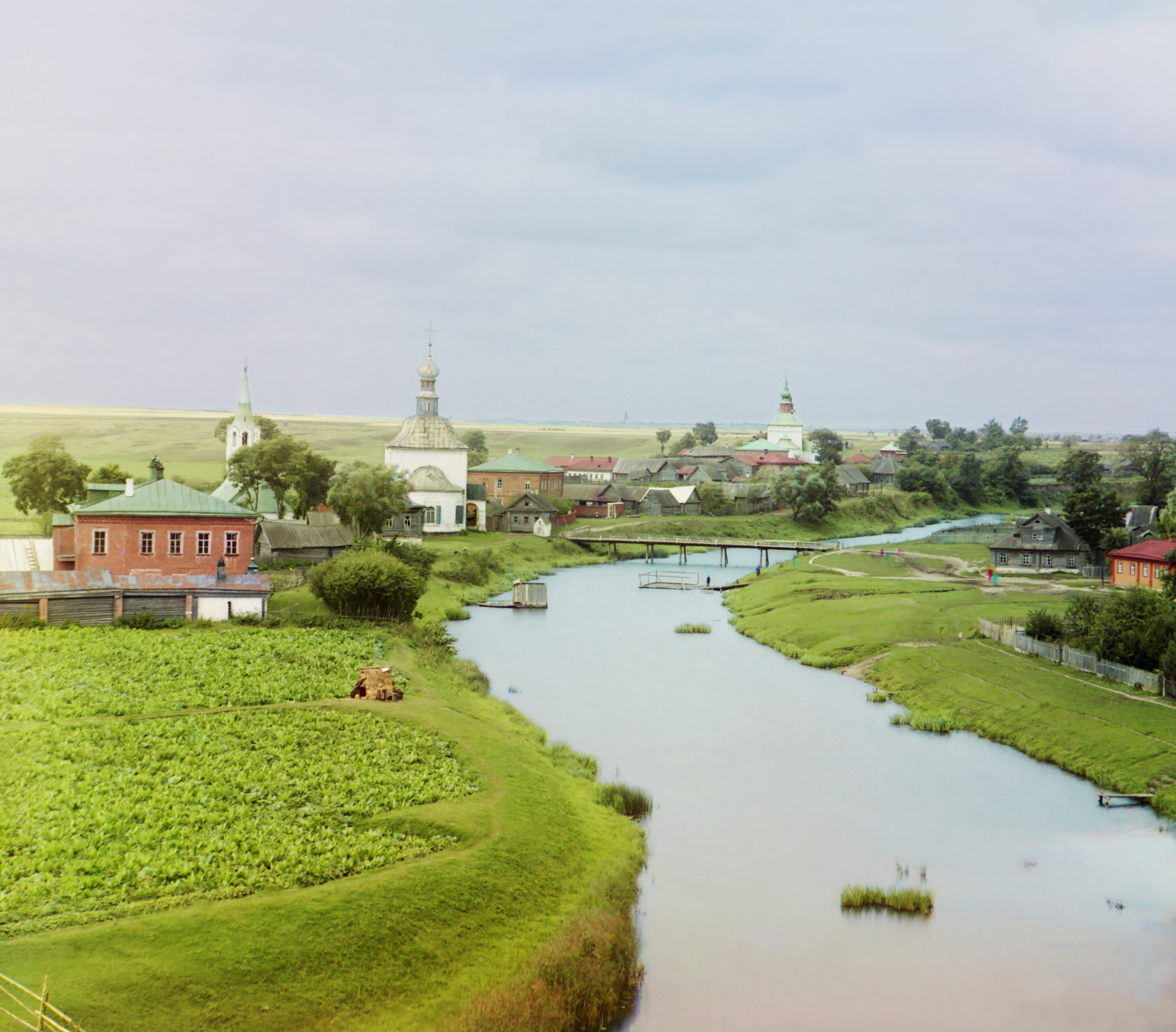
Suzdal in 1912

Although Suzdal is first mentioned in Russian chronicles under the year 1024, the region was already populated by various Finnic and East Slavic tribes by the 9th and 10th centuries. It arose on the site of a settlement belonging to the Meryans. By 1096, Suzdal was fortified.

At the turn of the 12th century, Grand Prince Vladimir Monomakh arrived with a wave of settlers. Around 1102, he began the construction of a stone cathedral in Suzdal. He appointed his son Yury Dolgoruky as the prince of Suzdal, and by the time of his death in 1125, the Rostov-Suzdal principality had become virtually independent. Suzdal became the new capital and Yury promoted the founding of new towns, including Moscow.

The reigns of Yury and his sons Andrey and Vsevolod led to the strengthening of the principality. In 1157, the capital was moved to Vladimir, and Suzdal became part of the Grand Principality of Vladimir. In 1222–1225, Grand Prince Yury II replaced the cathedral with a new one dedicated to the Theotokos.

Following the Mongol conquest, Suzdal became the capital of the Principality of Suzdal in 1238. The Nativity Cathedral withstood the Mongol siege and sacking of the town, although its interior was looted. Vladimir-Suzdal fragmented throughout the 13th century, leading to the emergence of independent principalities. In 1341, Suzdal united with Nizhny Novgorod to form the Principality of Nizhny Novgorod-Suzdal. In 1350, Konstantin of Suzdal assumed the title of grand prince and moved his capital to Nizhny Novgorod. In 1392, Grand Prince Vasily I of Moscow annexed the principality.

The Nativity Cathedral stood until 1445, when the Tatars sacked Suzdal and set fire to the inside of the cathedral, causing the upper part of the structure to collapse. After a decline in political significance, the town regained prominence as a religious center, with development projects funded by Grand Prince Vasily III and Tsar Ivan IV in the 16th century. For instance, Vasily III rebuilt the Nativity Cathedral as part of his campaign to restore the heritage of Russian lands under the control of Moscow.

Suzdal was the seat of a diocese until the 19th century. In the late 17th and 18th centuries, it was a metropolitan see within the Russian Orthodox Church. From the 16th century onward, new monasteries and churches were actively built. The Monastery of Saint Euthymius and Intercession Convent were among the largest in feudal Russia. In the late 17th and 18th centuries, wealthy merchants funded the construction of 30 churches, many of which still stand today.

In the mid-17th century, a new period of economic development began. A general plan was approved and partially implemented in 1788. In 1864, local merchants failed to convince the government to build the Trans-Siberian Railway through their town. Instead, it went through Vladimir, 35 km (22 mi) away. In 1967, Suzdal earned a federally protected status, which officially limited development in the area.

In 1943, high-ranking Nazi officers captured at the Battle of Stalingrad were imprisoned within Suzdal's monastery.

In modern times, the town has served as a tourist center, containing many examples of old Russian architecture. Over 200 historical and architectural monuments have been preserved. Much of its rural infrastructure and partially unpaved streets have also been preserved.

== Administrative and municipal status ==
Within the framework of administrative divisions, Suzdal serves as the administrative center of Suzdalsky District, to which it is directly subordinated. As a municipal division, the town of Suzdal is incorporated within Suzdalsky Municipal District as Suzdal Urban Settlement.

== Tourism ==
The primary industry of Suzdal is tourism. Suzdal avoided the industrialization of the Soviet era and thus 13th-19th architecture remained preserved. There are 305 monuments and listed buildings in Suzdal, including 30 churches, 14 bell towers, and 5 monasteries and convents. 79 of them are federally protected buildings and 167 are regionally protected.

In 1982, Suzdal became the first Russian town to receive La Pomme d'Or (Golden Apple) - a prize for excellence in the tourism industry, awarded annually by the World Federation of Travel Journalists and Writers (FIJET).

In 1992, two of the monuments (Saviour Monastery of St Euthymius and Kremlin with Nativity of the Virgin Cathedral) were included in the UNESCO World Heritage List, together with six other White Monuments in the region.

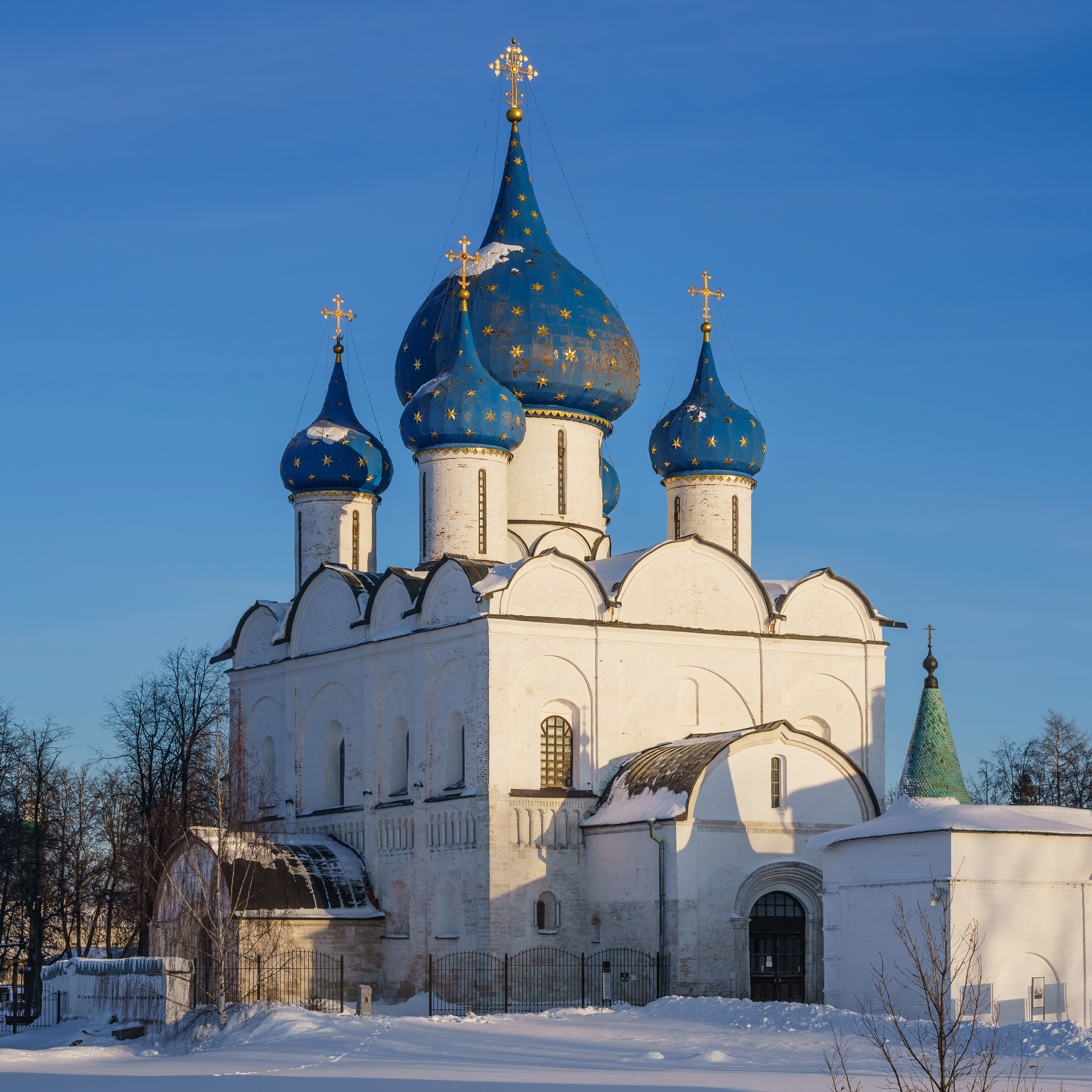
The Cathedral of Nativity

=== Notable buildings ===
- The Kremlin is the oldest part of Suzdal, dating from the 10th century. It is a predecessor of the Moscow Kremlin. In the 12th century, it was the base of Prince Yury Dolgoruky, who ruled the northeastern part of Kievan Rus' and founded an outpost, which is now Moscow. A posad (settlement) to the east became home to the secular population, such as shopkeepers and craftsmen, while the Kremlin (fortress) proper was the home of the prince, the archbishop, and the high clergy. Within the Kremlin, the Archbishop’s Chambers house the Suzdal History Exhibition, which includes a visit to the 18th-century Cross Hall, which was used for receptions. More exhibits are provided in the 1635 Kremlin bell tower (Russian: Звонница) in the yard.
- The 1.4-kilometre-long (0.9 mi) earth rampart of the Kremlin encloses a number of houses and churches, including the Nativity of the Virgin Cathedral. The cathedral, characterized with gold and blue domes, was constructed in 1222–1225 by Yury II on the site of an earlier church built around 1102 by Vladimir Monomakh. It was built of light tufa with limestones for details. In 1445 the cathedral collapsed and was rebuilt in 1528–1530 with the upper structure and drums being constructed of new brick. The original 13th-century door from the cathedral is now on exhibition in the Archbishop's Chambers.
- Saviour Monastery of St Euthymius, was founded in 1352 to the north of the town centre on the high bank of the Kamenka river. It was built under the order of the Suzdal-Nizhniy Novgorod prince Konstantin. The monastery was planned as a fortress and was originally enclosed by a wooden wall, later destroyed by the Poles. Today's reddish brick walls of the Suzdal monastery were erected over four years, from 1640 to 1644. The fortifications have 12 towers constructed to house artillery power. Later in 1766, with Catherine the Great's orders, the monastery became a prison, which had a reputation for severe punishment of prisoners. In 1905 the prison closed; however, it later served as a prison again during the Soviet Era.

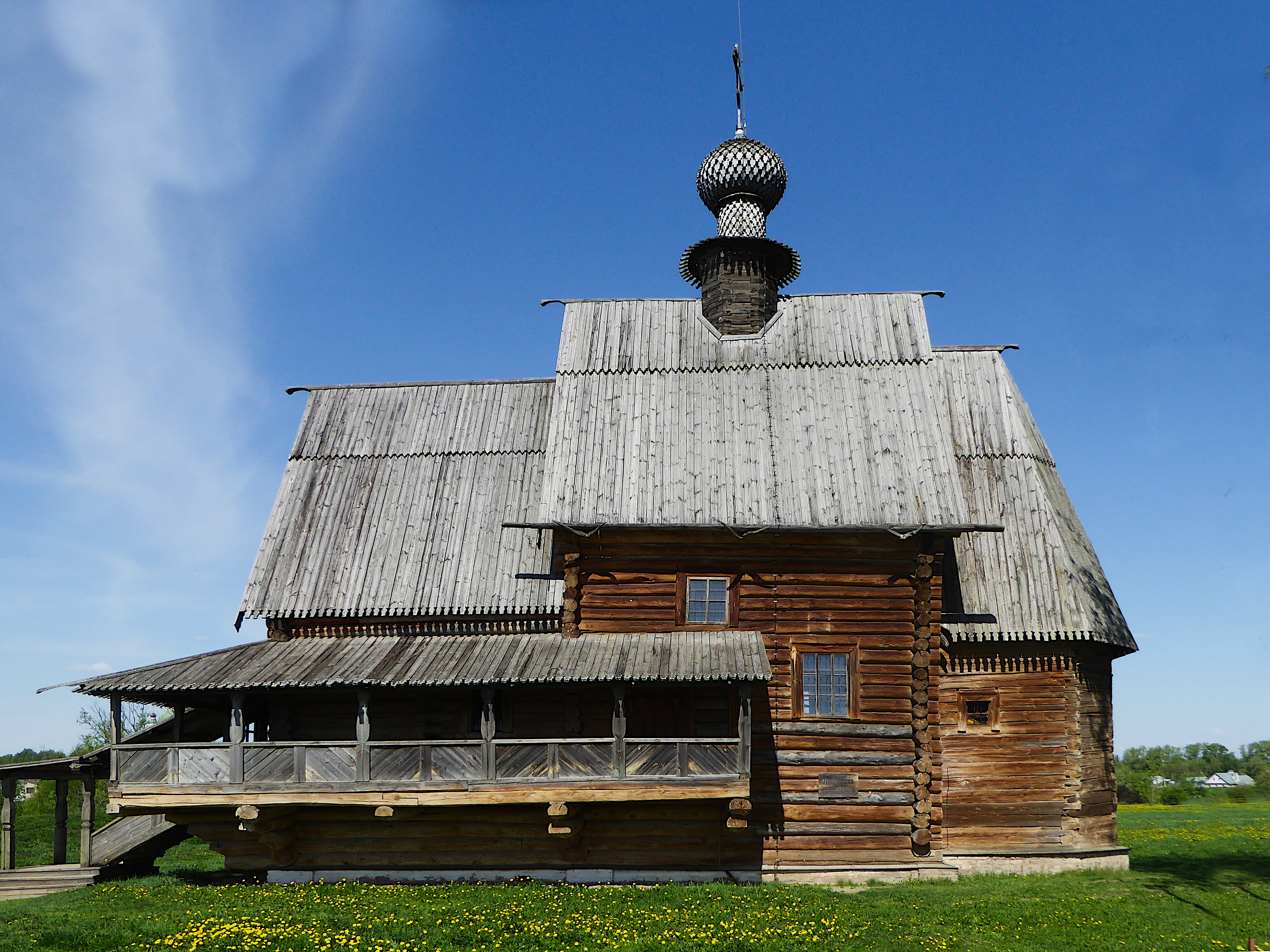
Wooden Church of St. Nicholas (Souzdal)

- The Wooden Church of St. Nicholas, originally built in Glotovo in 1766 and made entirely of wood, was moved to Suzdal in 1960 to become part of the Museum of Wooden Architecture and Peasant Life. The church is elevated off the ground about a story high from when it was moved across the country.
- St John the Baptist Church, built in 1720, at the same time as the Wooden Church of St. Nicholas. It was constructed with white plastered walls and wooden supports.
- St Alexander Convent, built in 1240 by an unknown architect. The princesses of Suzdal, Mariya and Agrippina, were buried here in the 14th century.
- Intercession Convent, founded in 1364. In its centre stands the Cathedral of the Intercession, an add-on built in 1518, financed by Vasili III of Russia. The interior of the cathedral is plain white stone, with no paintings nor stained glass. The church houses the burial vaults of 20 nuns of noble birth. An art museum containing works created in the 16th and 17th centuries is connected to the cathedral.

=== Festivals ===
- Open Russian Festival of Animated Film, held annually in March since 2002, with the support of the Russian Ministry of Culture.
- Cucumber Day Festival with folk music performances is celebrated by locals on the second Saturday of July, every year since 2001.

== Film ==
More than 60 movies were filmed in Suzdal and the vicinity. Among them are:

- Andrei Rublev (USSR, 1966)
- Bratya Karamazovy (USSR, 1969)
- Finist, the brave Falcon (USSR, 1976)
- The Shooting Party (USSR, 1978)
- Tema (USSR, 1979)
- Yunost Petra (USSR, 1980)
- Charodei (USSR, 1982)
- Dead Souls (USSR, 1984)
- Peter the Great (USA, 1986)
- Tsar (Russia, 2009)

== Twin towns ==
Suzdal is twinned with:

- Rothenburg ob der Tauber, Germany, since 1988
- Cles, Italy, since 1991
- Oberlin, United States, since 1991
- Windham, United States, since 1992
- Évora, Portugal, since 2006
- Loches, France, since 2011
- Shangrao, China, since 2012

== Notable people ==
- Solomonia Saburova (1490–1542), the first wife of Grand prince Vasili III of Muscovy, canonized by the Russian Orthodox Church as St Sofia of Suzdal
- Dmitry Pozharsky (1577–1642), national hero, granted the title Saviour of the Motherland for routing the Polish invasion
- Eudoxia Lopukhina (1669–1698), Tsarina, the first wife of Peter the Great, banished to the Intercession Convent of Suzdal
- Dmitry Vinogradov (1720–1758), chemist, the founder of the Imperial Porcelain Factory, Saint Petersburg
- Aleksei Gastev (1882–1939), revolutionary, trade-union activist and a pioneer of scientific management in Russia
- Sergei Shirokogorov (1887–1939), founder of Russian anthropology
- Vasily Blokhin (1895–1955), chief executioner of the NKVD (Soviet Secret Police) during the Great Purge and World War II
- Yuri Modin (1922–2007), KGB controller for the "Cambridge Five"

== See also ==
- Church of Boris & Gleb—church in a nearby Kideksha village, UNESCO World Heritage Site, 4 km (2.5 mi) away.

== Sources ==
- "Суздаль" . Brockhaus and Efron Encyclopedic Dictionary (in Russian). 1906.
- Brumfield, William Craft (2009). Suzdal: Architectural Heritage in Photographs. Moscow: Tri Kvadrata. ISBN 978-5-94607-118-5.
- Brumfield, William Craft (June 12, 2020). Journeys through the Russian Empire: The Photographic Legacy of Sergey Prokudin-Gorsky. Duke University Press. ISBN 978-1-4780-0746-3.
- Feldbrugge, Ferdinand J. M. (October 2, 2017). A History of Russian Law: From Ancient Times to the Council Code (Ulozhenie) of Tsar Aleksei Mikhailovich of 1649. BRILL. ISBN 978-90-04-35214-8.
- Fennell, John (2014) [1983]. The Crisis of Medieval Russia, 1200–1304. Longman History of Russia. Routledge. ISBN 978-0-582-48150-3.
- Lappo, G. M., ed. (1998). "Суздаль". Города России. Энциклопедия (in Russian). Большая российская энциклопедия. pp. 446–448. ISBN 5-300-01747-7.
- Makarov, N. A.; Pavlinov, P. S. (2016). "Суздаль". In Kravets, S. L. (ed.). Большая Российская энциклопедия. Том 31: Социальное партнёрство — Телевидение (in Russian). Большая Российская энциклопедия. pp. 398–400. ISBN 978-5-85270-368-2.
- Vodoff, Vladimir (2000). "Russia, North-East". In Vauchez, Andre (ed.). Encyclopedia of the Middle Ages. Vol. 2. Fitzroy Dearborn Publishers. p. 1268. ISBN 978-1-57958-282-1.
- Администрация Владимирской области. Постановление №433 от 13 июня 2007 г. «О реестре административно-территориальных образований и единиц Владимирской области», в ред. Постановления №169 от 5 марта 2015 г. «О внесении изменения в Постановление Губернатора области от 13.06.2007 №433 "О реестре административно-территориальных образований и единиц Владимирской области"». Вступил в силу со дня официального опубликования. Опубликован: "Владимирские ведомости", №114, 20 июня 2007 г. (Administration of Vladimir Oblast. Resolution #433 of June 13, 2007 On the Registry of the Administrative-Territorial Formations and Units of Vladimir Oblast, as amended by the Resolution #169 of March 5, 2015 On Amending Resolution #433 of the Oblast Governor of June 13, 2007 "On the Registry of the Administrative-Territorial Formations and Units of Vladimir Oblast". Effective as of the day of the official publication.).
- Законодательное Собрание Владимирской области. Закон №190-ОЗ от 26 ноября 2004 г. «О наделении Суздальского района и вновь образованных муниципальных образований, входящих в его состав, соответствующим статусом муниципальных образований и установлении их границ», в ред. Закона №90-ОЗ от 5 августа 2009 г. «О внесении изменений в Закон Владимирской области "О наделении Суздальского района и вновь образованных муниципальных образований, входящих в его состав, соответствующим статусом муниципальных образований и установлении их границ"». Вступил в силу со дня официального опубликования (27 ноября 2004 г.). Опубликован: "Владимирские ведомости", №331, 27 ноября 2004 г. (Legislative Assembly of Vladimir Oblast. Law #190-OZ of November 26, 2004 On Granting Suzdalsky District and the Newly Established Municipal Formations Comprising It an Appropriate Status of the Municipal Formations and on Establishing Their Borders, as amended by the Law #90-OZ of August 5, 2009 On Amending the Law of Vladimir Oblast "On Granting Suzdalsky District and the Newly Established Municipal Formations Comprising It an Appropriate Status of the Municipal Formations and on Establishing Their Borders". Effective as of the day of the official publication (November 27, 2004).).
