= Suzdal Kremlin =

UNESCO World Heritage Site
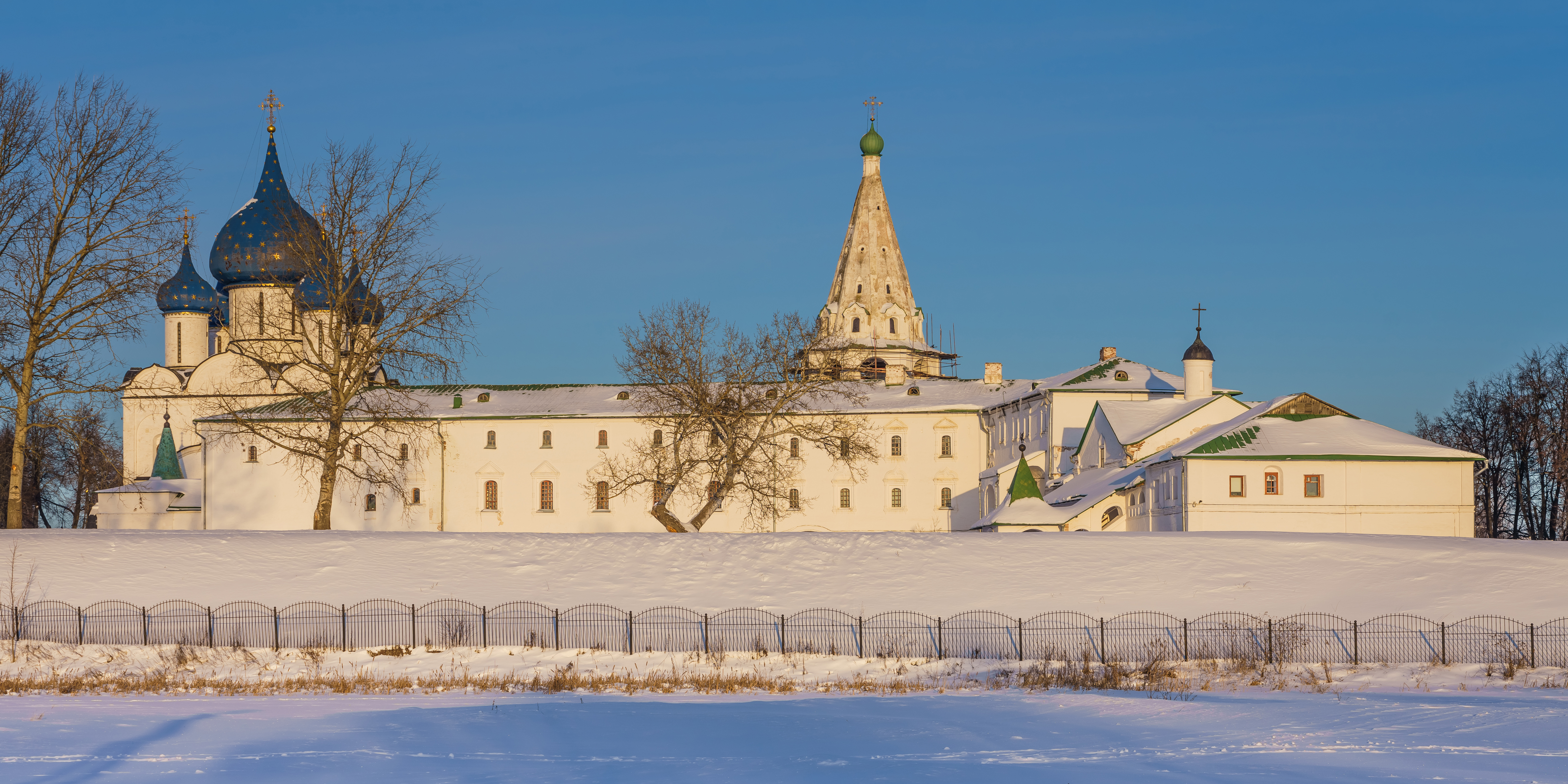
- Exterior view

- Location within European Russia
- Location: Suzdal, Russia
- Part of: "Kremlin of Suzdal and Cathedral of the Nativity" part of White Monuments of Vladimir and Suzdal
- Criteria: Cultural: (i)(ii)(iv)
- Reference: 633-006
- Inscription: 1992 (16th Session)
- Coordinates: 56°25′N 40°26′E

The Suzdal Kremlin (Russian: Суздальский кремль) is the oldest part of the city of Suzdal, Russia, dating from the 10th century. Like other Russian kremlins, it was originally a fortress or citadel which was the religious and administrative center of the city. It is most notably the site of the Cathedral of the Nativity.

Together with several structures in the neighboring city of Vladimir, it was named a UNESCO World Heritage Site in 1992.

== History ==
While archeological evidence suggests that the Suzdal Kremlin was settled as early as the 10th century, the fortress itself was built in the late 11th or early 12th century. The fortress was strategically located on a bend of the Kamenka river on three sides and a moat to the east. It was surrounded by earthen ramparts that remain to the present day. A settlement (posad Russian: посад) to the east became home to the secular population - shopkeepers and craftsmen, while the Kremlin proper was the home of the prince, the archbishop, and the high clergy.

From the 13th to the 16th centuries, several monasteries and churches were constructed, including the Cathedral of the Nativity, the Intercession Convent, and the Monastery of Our Saviour and St. Euthymius.

In November 2025, archaeologists announced the confirmation of the burial remains of Saint Hilarion and his tomb in the Suzdal Kremlin Cathedral. A total of 62 bone fragments were identified as belonging to an elderly male whose age corresponds with historical records of Hilarion’s death. Associated finds included elaborately decorated textiles such as gold-embroidered cloth, velvet, and satin interpreted as remnants of ceremonial vestments.

== See also ==
- List of castles in Russia
- White Monuments of Vladimir and Suzdal
- Vladimir-Suzdal

== Gallery ==
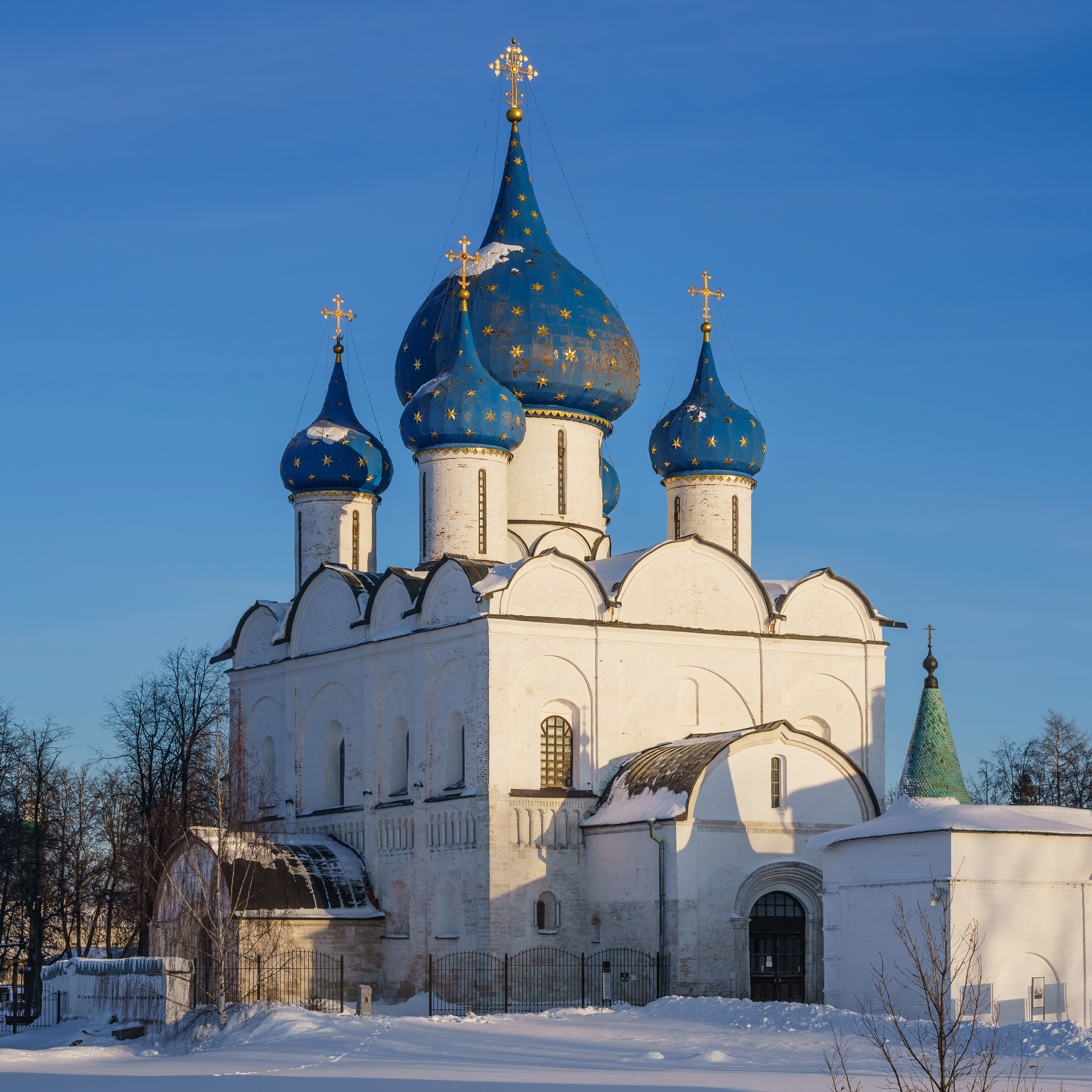
Cathedral of the Nativity

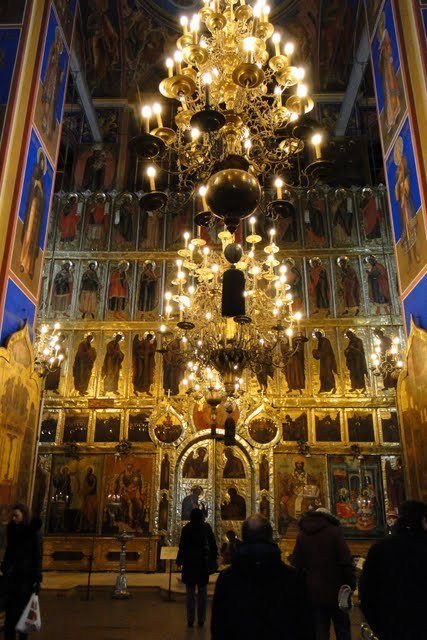
Interior view of the Cathedral of the Nativity

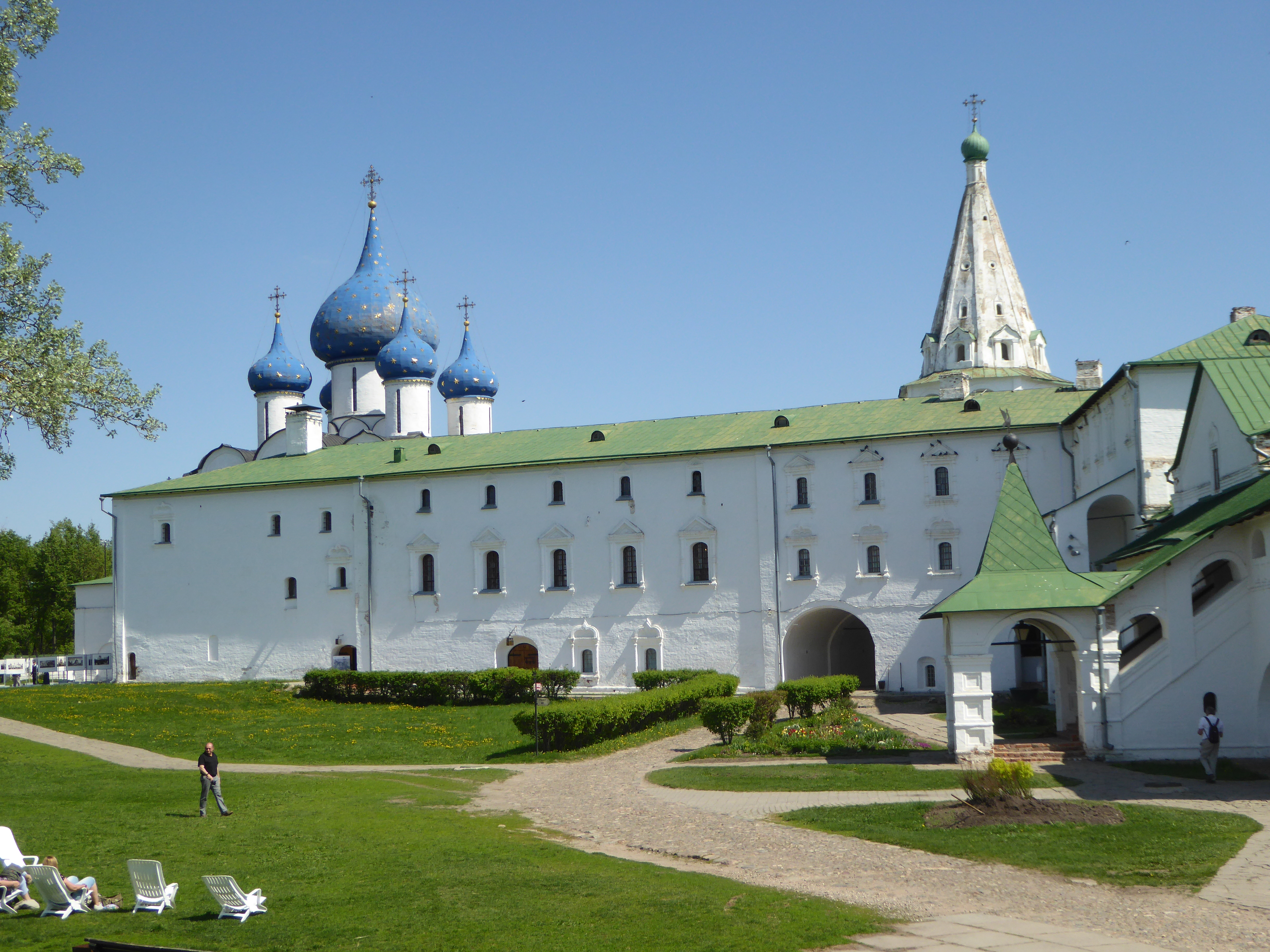
Episcopal Palace

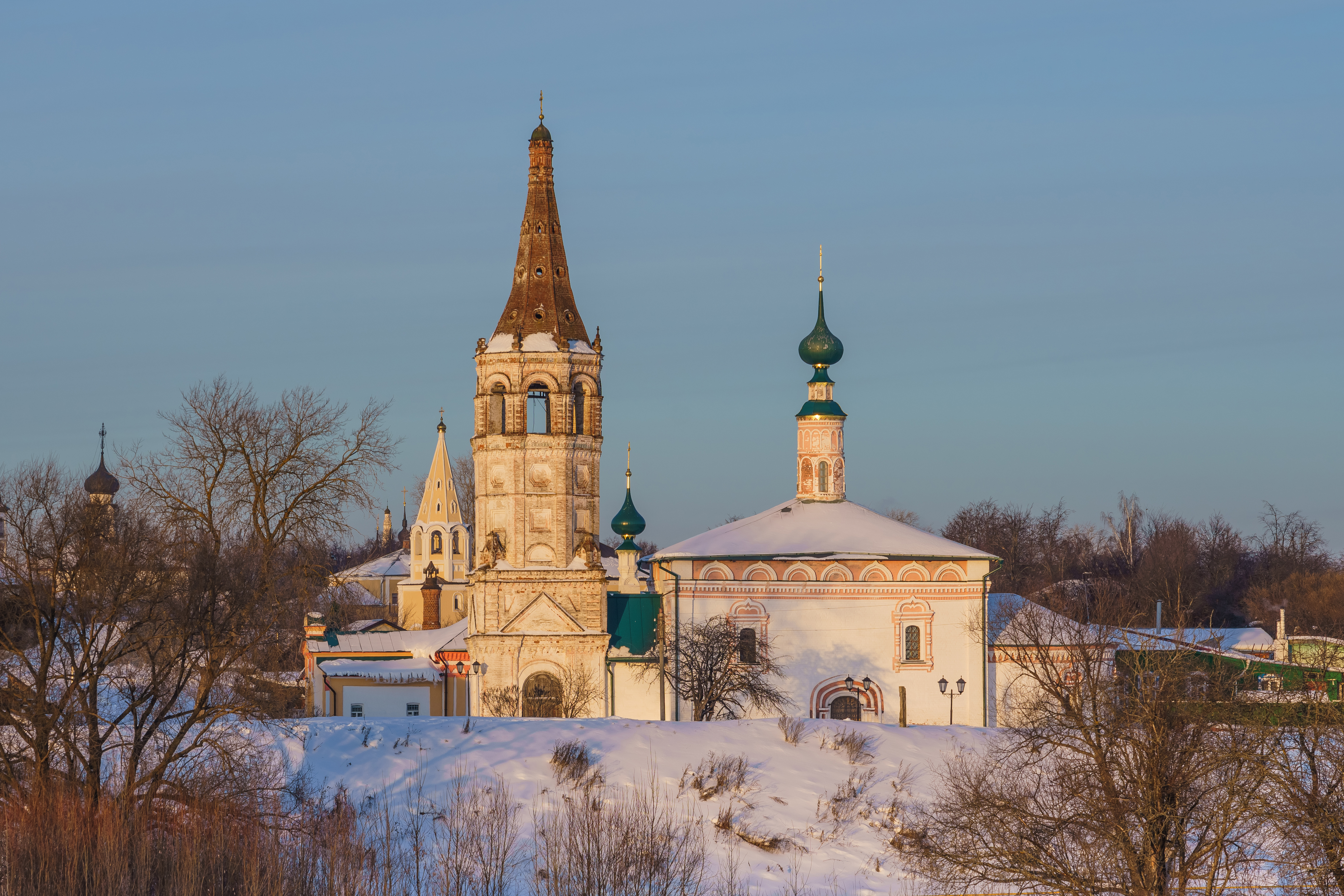
St. Nicholas Church with tented-roof tower

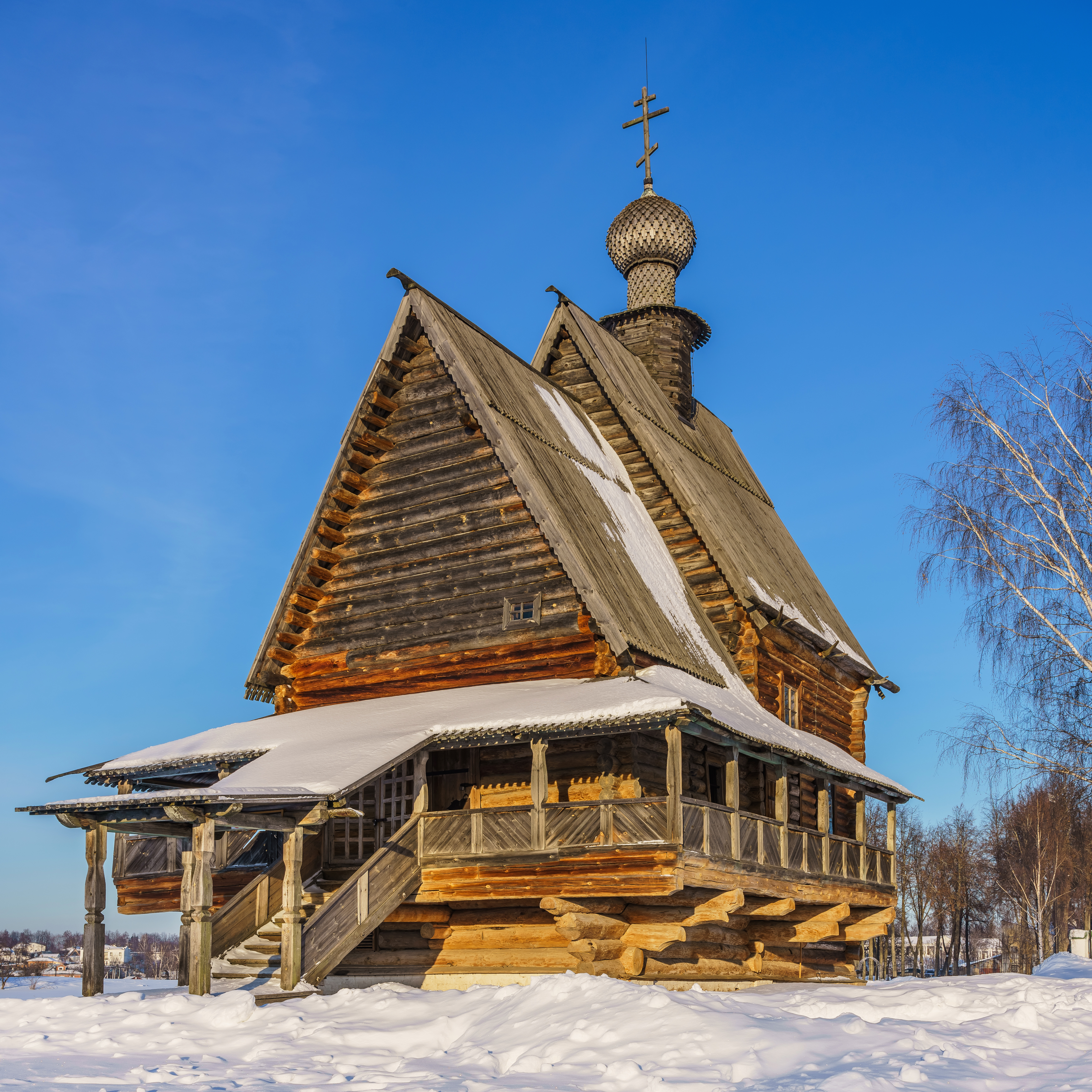
Wooden St. Nicholas Church
