= Boris and Gleb Church, Kideksha =

Church in Russia

Church of Sts Boris and Gleb
UNESCO World Heritage Site
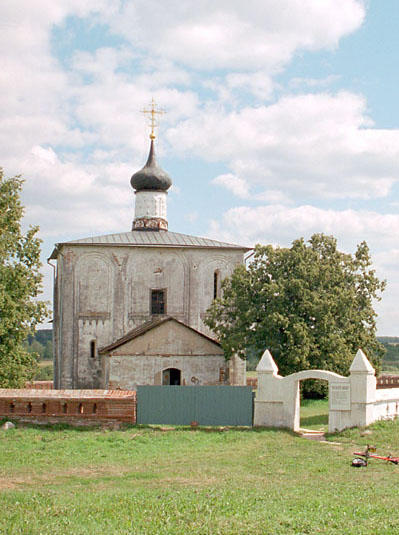
- Church of Sts Boris and Gleb

- Location within European Russia
- Location: Kideksha, Russia
- Part of: White Monuments of Vladimir and Suzdal
- Criteria: Cultural: (i)(ii)(iv)
- Reference: 633-008
- Inscription: 1992 (16th Session)
- Coordinates: 56°25′30″N 40°31′45″E

The Church of Boris and Gleb is a church built in 1152, on the orders of Prince Yuri Dolgoruky, in Kideksha on the Nerl River, "where the encampment of Saint Boris had been". It was probably part of the princely (wooden) palace complex, but was only used by Dolgoruky for a few years before he left to become Grand Prince of Kiev in 1155. The village, four kilometers east of Suzdal, was an important town before it was destroyed by the Mongols and declined in stature. The church is built in the Vladimir-Suzdal school.

The church, built in limestone probably by architects from Galicia, is a four-piered, three-apse church. It is one of the oldest in the district and one of the few churches built by Dolgorukii that is still extant. It retains fragments of frescoes dating back to the twelfth century. In the medieval period it was the site of a monastery and was then a parish church. The building has been significantly altered over the centuries. It lost its original vaulting and dome (the current roof and small dome date to the seventeenth century) and the apses are thought to be half their original height (their tops too were lost with the roof); a porch was added in the nineteenth century.

The church is a part of a UNESCO World Heritage Site "White Monuments of Vladimir and Suzdal" along with the seven other medieval monuments located in Vladimir and its surroundings (The Vladimir-Suzdal Museum-Preserve), and belongs to the monuments of the Golden Ring of Russia.

The church, along with other structures built around it in later centuries - namely the St. Stephen's Church and bell-tower) appears on a three-ruble silver commemorative coin struck by the St. Petersburg Mint in 2002.
