= Cathedral of the Nativity of the Theotokos, Suzdal =

UNESCO World Heritage Site
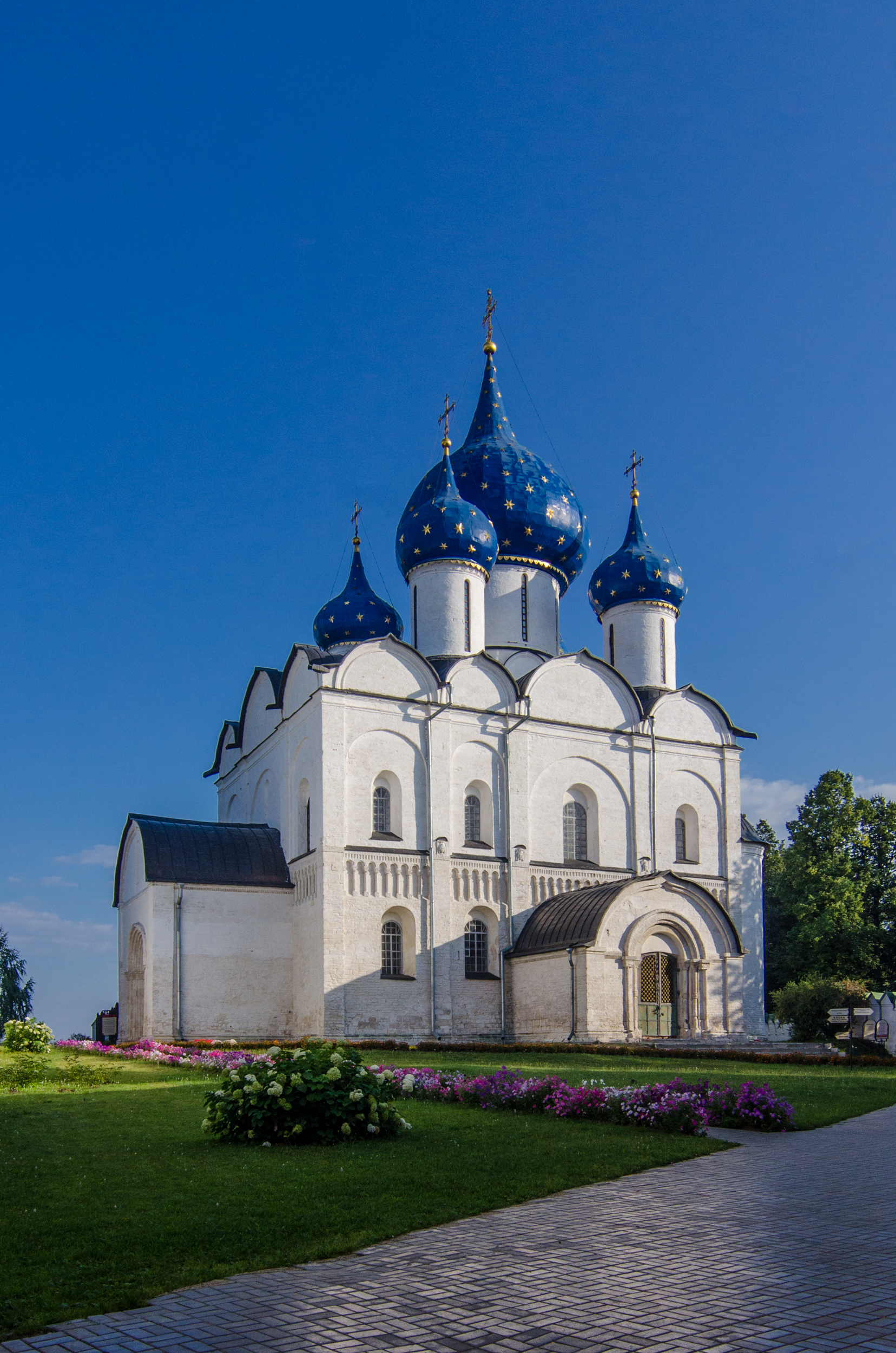

- Location within European Russia
- Location: Suzdal, Russia
- Part of: "Kremlin of Suzdal and Cathedral of the Nativity" part of White Monuments of Vladimir and Suzdal
- Criteria: Cultural: (i)(ii)(iv)
- Reference: 633-006
- Inscription: 1992 (16th Session)
- Coordinates: 56°25′00″N 40°26′33″E

The Cathedral of the Nativity of the Theotokos in Suzdal, Russia, is a World Heritage Site. It is one of the eight White Monuments of Vladimir and Suzdal and one of the most complex monuments of Russian medieval architecture. It was originally constructed during the reign of Vladimir II Monomakh in the late 11th century.

The Cathedral of the Nativity is surrounded by a ring of earthen walls in an oxbow of Kamenka River. It is notable for being the first city cathedral not built for the exclusive use of the knyaz or his relatives. The cathedral contains the remains of a son of Yuri Dolgoruki, knyazes of the Shuisky family and others.

== History ==
A cathedral was originally built on or around this site during the reign of Vladimir II Monomakh in 1102. In 1222, on the orders of Yuri II of Vladimir, this dilapidated building was demolished and replaced by a new one, built of white tufa stone and decorated with limestone. In 1238 Suzdal was sacked by the Mongols, the interior of the cathedral was destroyed. The building survived through centuries of the Tatar-Mongol yoke, but finally was burned down and collapsed in 1445.

In 1528-1530 Vasili III Ivanovich rebuilt the cathedral. After that restoration the remained old walls were lowered down to the arcade level, white stone was replaced by brick and laid in Muscovite style. Despite several fires and numerous changes throughout its history, the cathedral survives to this day.

The cathedral is recognized as a defining monument of medieval Russian culture.

== Gallery ==
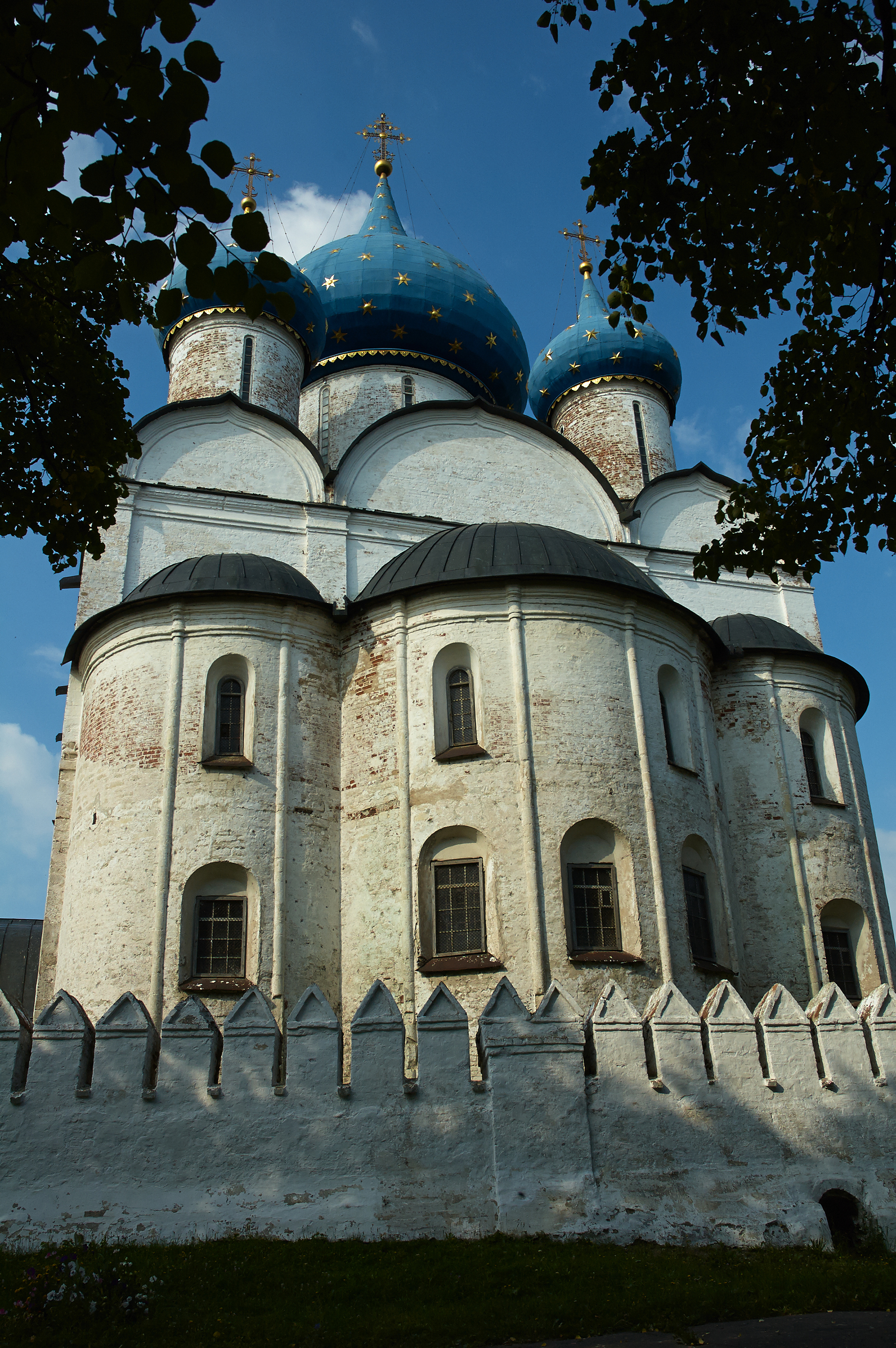

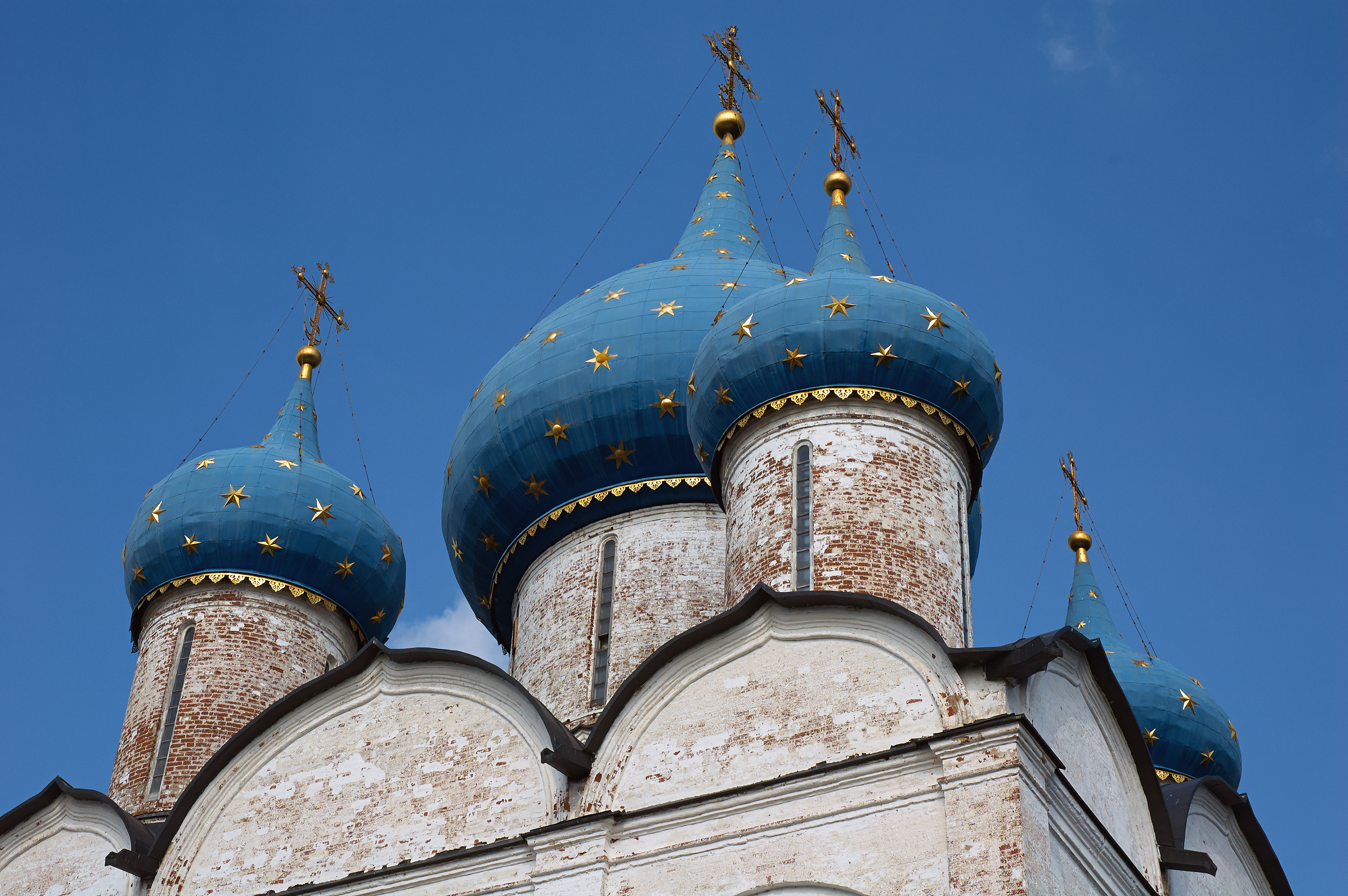

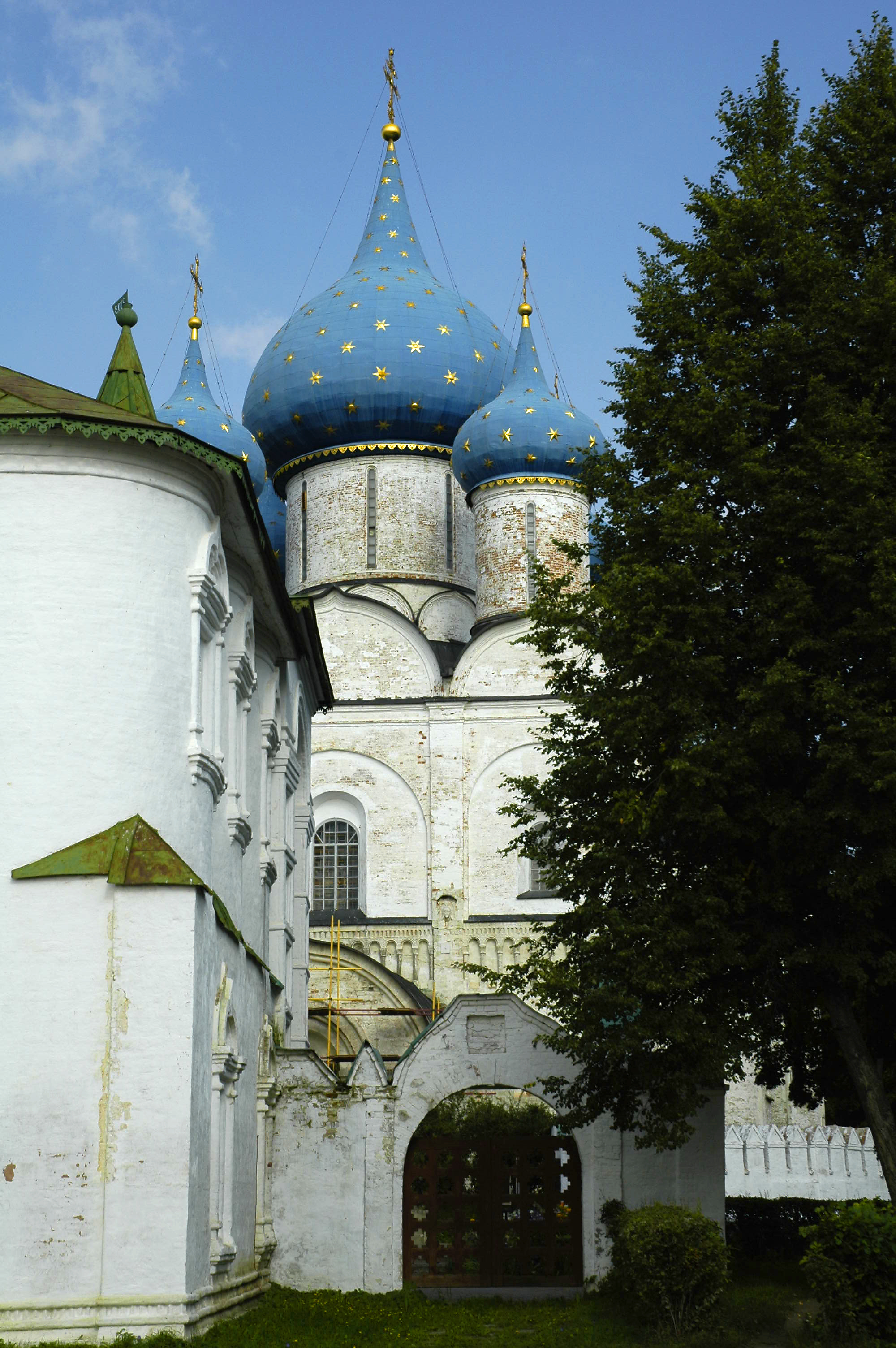

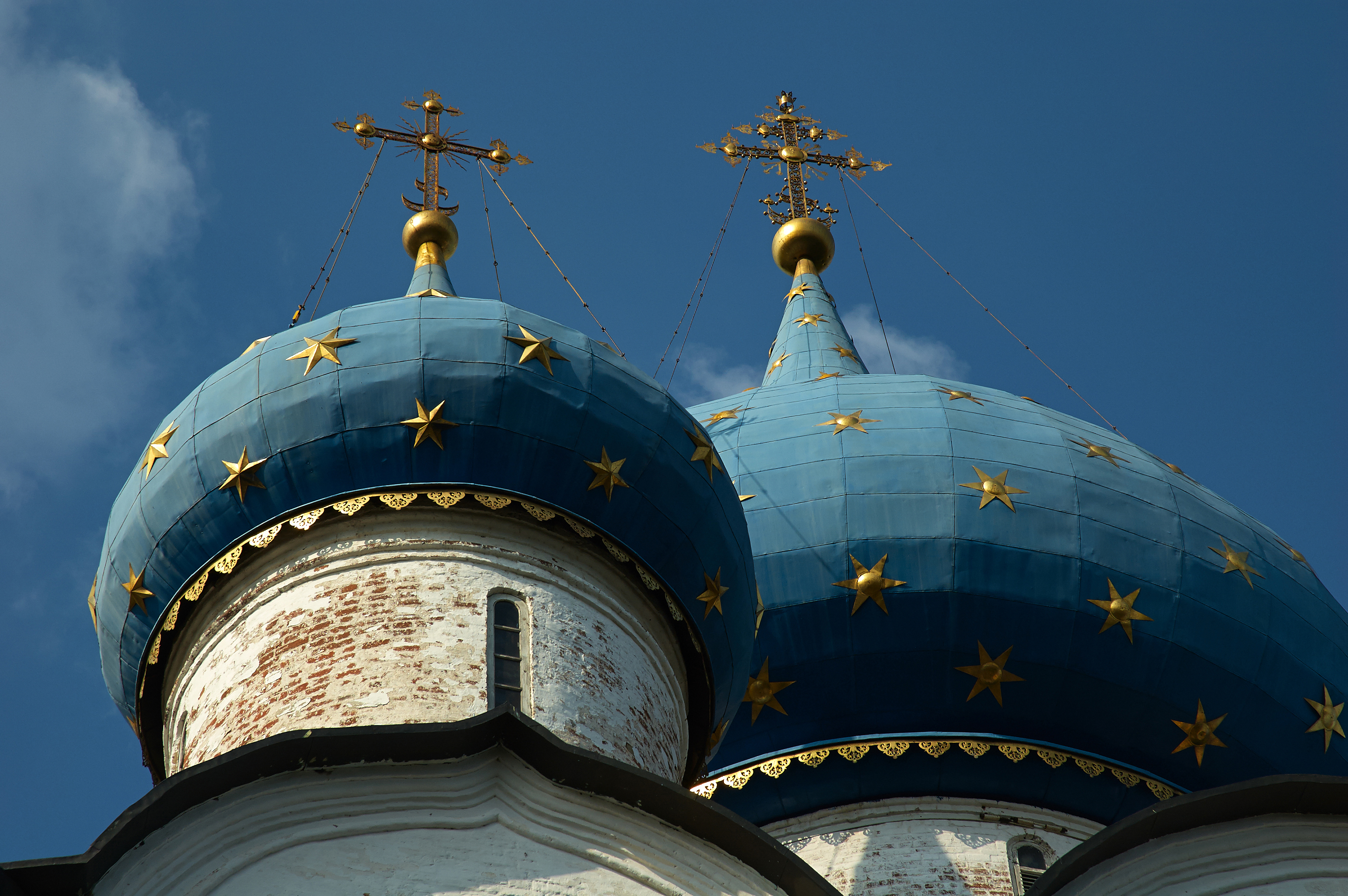

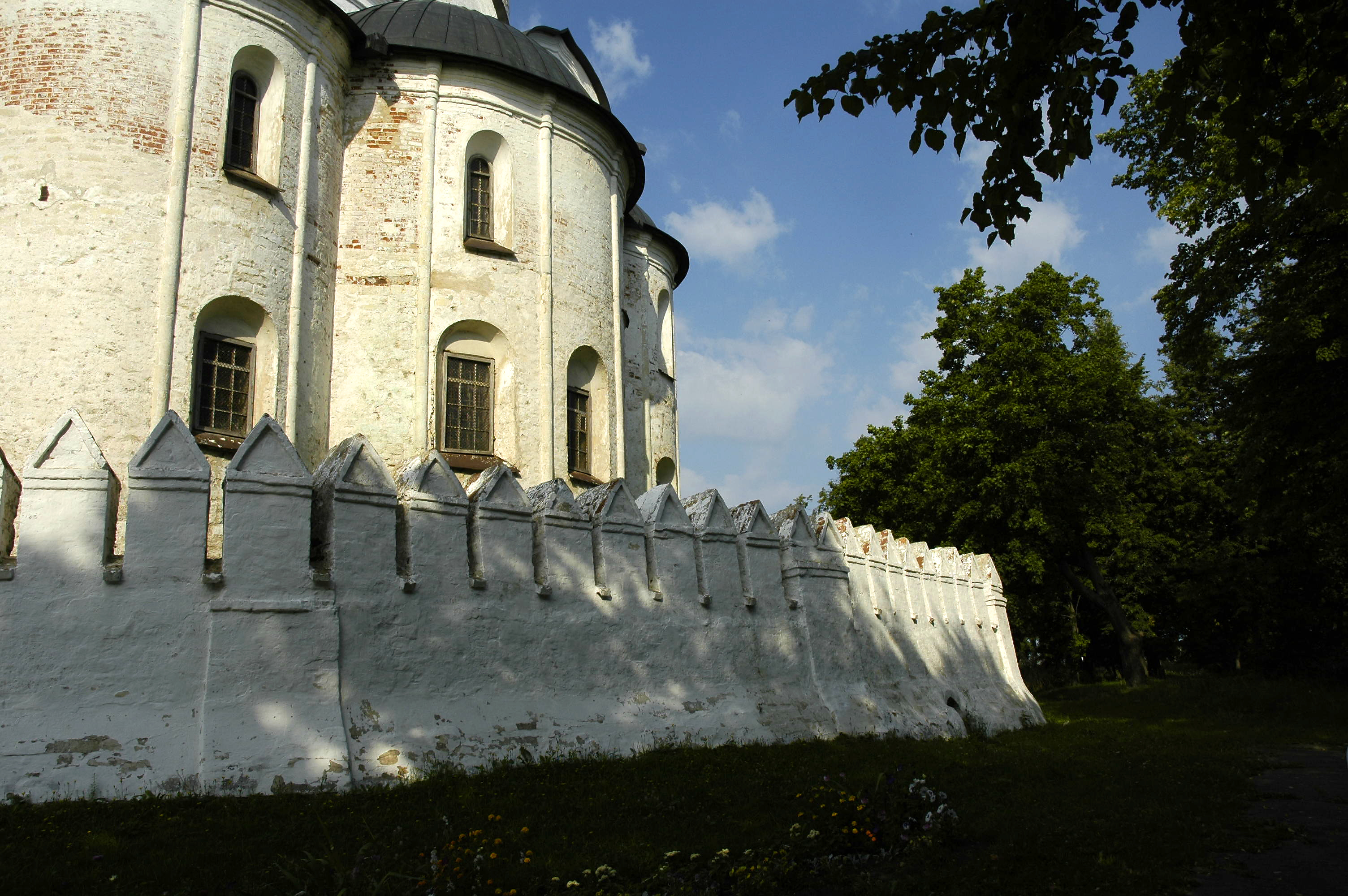
