= Monastery of Saint Euthymius =

Monastery of Our Savior and St Euthymius
UNESCO World Heritage Site
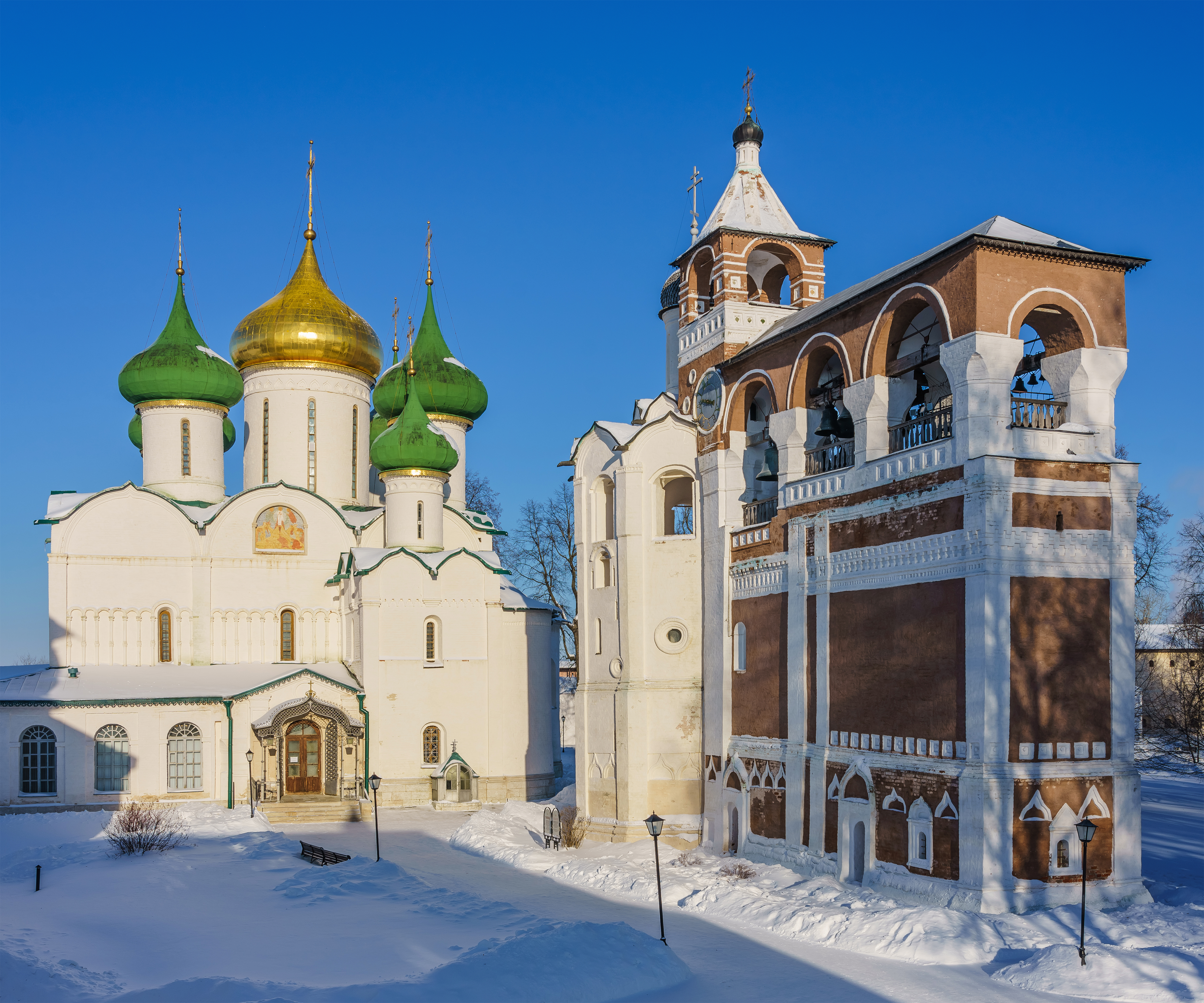
- Monastery of Our Savior and St Euthymius

- Location within European Russia
- Location: Suzdal, Russia
- Part of: White Monuments of Vladimir and Suzdal
- Criteria: Cultural: (i)(ii)(iv)
- Reference: 633-007
- Inscription: 1992 (16th Session)
- Coordinates: 56°26′00″N 40°26′25″E

The Saviour Monastery of St. Euthymius is a monastery of the Russian Orthodox Church in Suzdal, Vladimir Oblast, Russia, founded in 1352.

== History ==
=== Foundation ===
The monastery was founded in 1352 by the monk Yevfimi from Nizhny Novgorod, invited by Prince Boris of Suzdal. The monastery, originally called the Spassky, was located high over the Kamenka River and served as a fortress to protect the town from any attackers. The original monastery buildings were made of wood, however, there is no data on their appearances. Monk Yevfimi (Euthymius) became the first archimandrite and lived here until 1404. Upon his death the monastery was renamed after him into the Spaso-Yevfimiev Monastery.

The Great Battle of Suzdal happened right next to the monastery, that ended with defeat of the Russians. Vasily II of Moscow was captured and taken as a prisoner to Ulugh Muhammad sons Makhmud and Jakub. The Mongols sacked Suzdal and moved to Vladimir.

=== Late Middle Ages ===
The first wooden Church of the Transfiguration of the Saviour was constructed in 1507—1511 above the Saint Euthymius tomb. In 1594 a cathedral with four internal piers was built around this church. The old historical part was renamed into the St Euthymius aisle. The new Cathedral of the Transfiguration of the Saviour was built of white stone in a traditional Russian style.

The monastery grew in importance in the 16th and 17th centuries after donations by Vasili III, Ivan IV and the Pozharsky family, a noble dynasty of the region. They financed the construction of the strong brick walls around the monastery in 1670—1680s, that replaced the old wooden wall. 11 of 12 wall towers were made in round faceted shape, except the main gate tower. It is 22 m high and decorated in traditional "uzorochye" style. Between the 16-17th centuries the monastery also got the Assumption Church, the bell tower and the seven-domed Cathedral of the Transfiguration of the Saviour. The cathedral was built in the style of the Grand Duchy of Vladimir-Suzdal. Its interior contains restored frescoes by the school of Gury Nikitin of Kostroma, dating from 1689. The tomb of Dmitry Pozharsky lies by the cathedral wall.

== The Architectural Ensemble ==
The complex includes:

- The Cathedral of the Transfiguration of the Saviour (1594)
- The campanile (16-17th centuries)
- The Annunciation Church Over-the-gate (16-17th centuries)
- The refectory Church of the Assumption (16th century)
- The Archimandrite's house (17th century)
- St. Nicholas Hospital with wards
- The Brethren's building (16-17th centuries)
- The Prison castle (18th century)
- Fortification towers (17th century)

The monastery prison was built in 1764. By order of Catherine the Great since 1766 it was used for religious dissidents. The prison was closed in 1905, but reopened during Soviet period, and among its better known prisoners was field marshal Friedrich Paulus, who was incarcerated here for a time after his surrender at Stalingrad.

The Annunciation Church Over-the-gate was built on a verge of the 16-17th centuries. The campanile was built in the early 16th century and topped with a gallery in the 17th century. The original bells were destroyed in 1930s, nowadays the campanile has 17 bells.

== 20th century ==
In 1923—1939 the old monastery prison served as detention facility for political prisoners (politisolator). In 1941 it was used as NKVD filtration camp, in 1943 there was a camp for war prisoners. From 1946 up to 1967 the monastery was turned into youth detention center for boys. In 1968 the monastery was turned into a museum complex managed by the Vladimir-Suzdal Museum-Reserve.

== Gallery ==
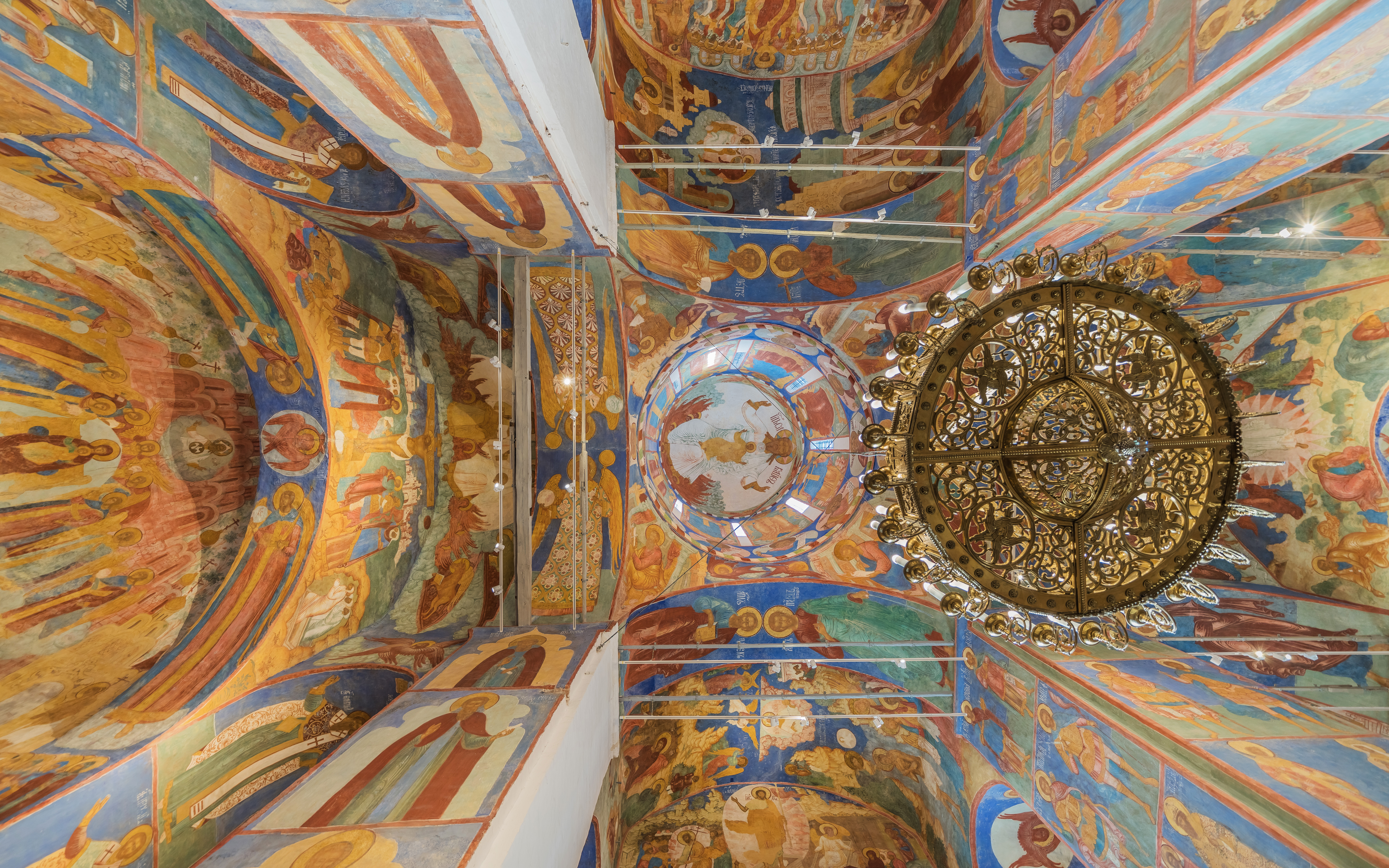
Frescoes inside the Transfiguration Cathedral

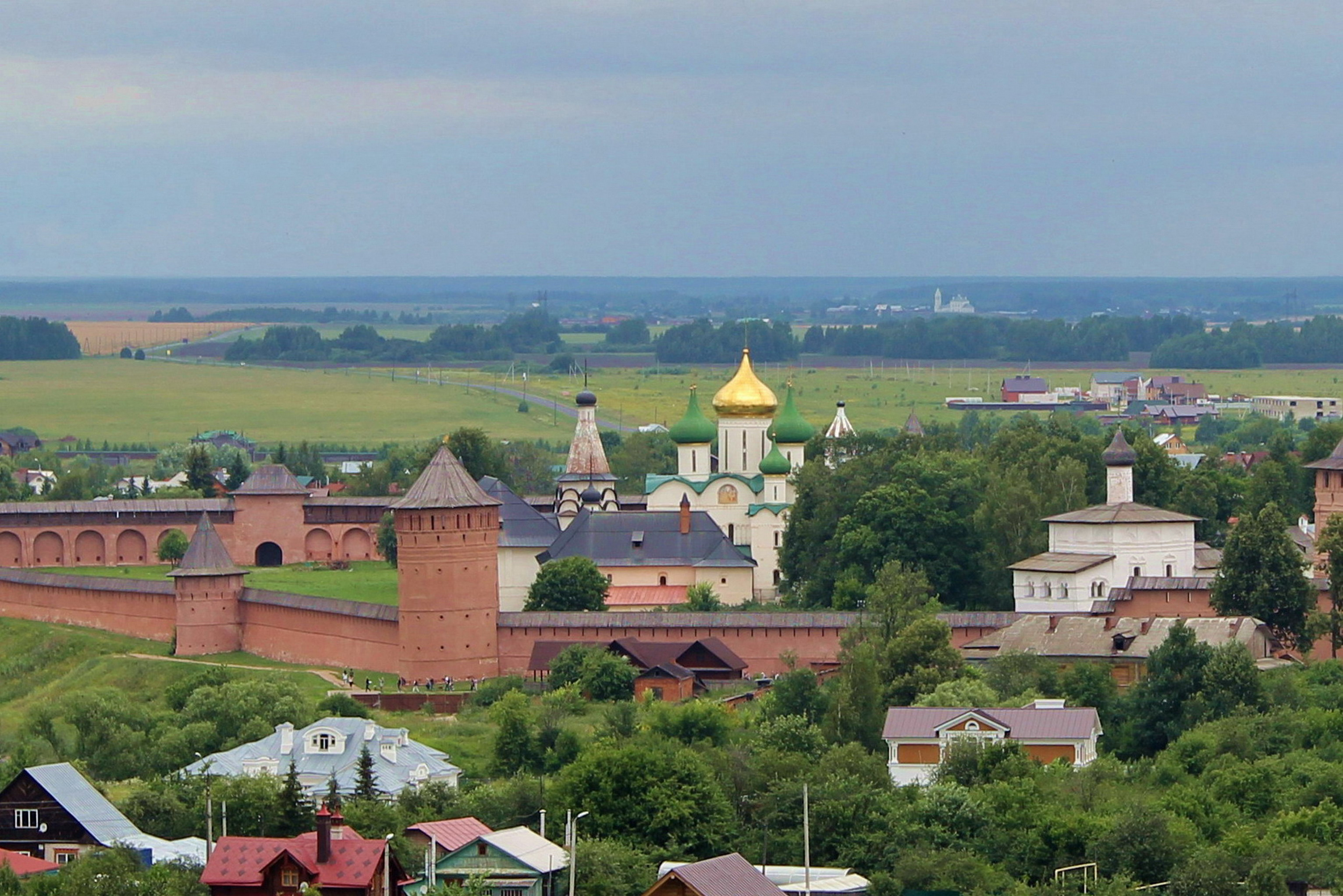
View from above, 2016

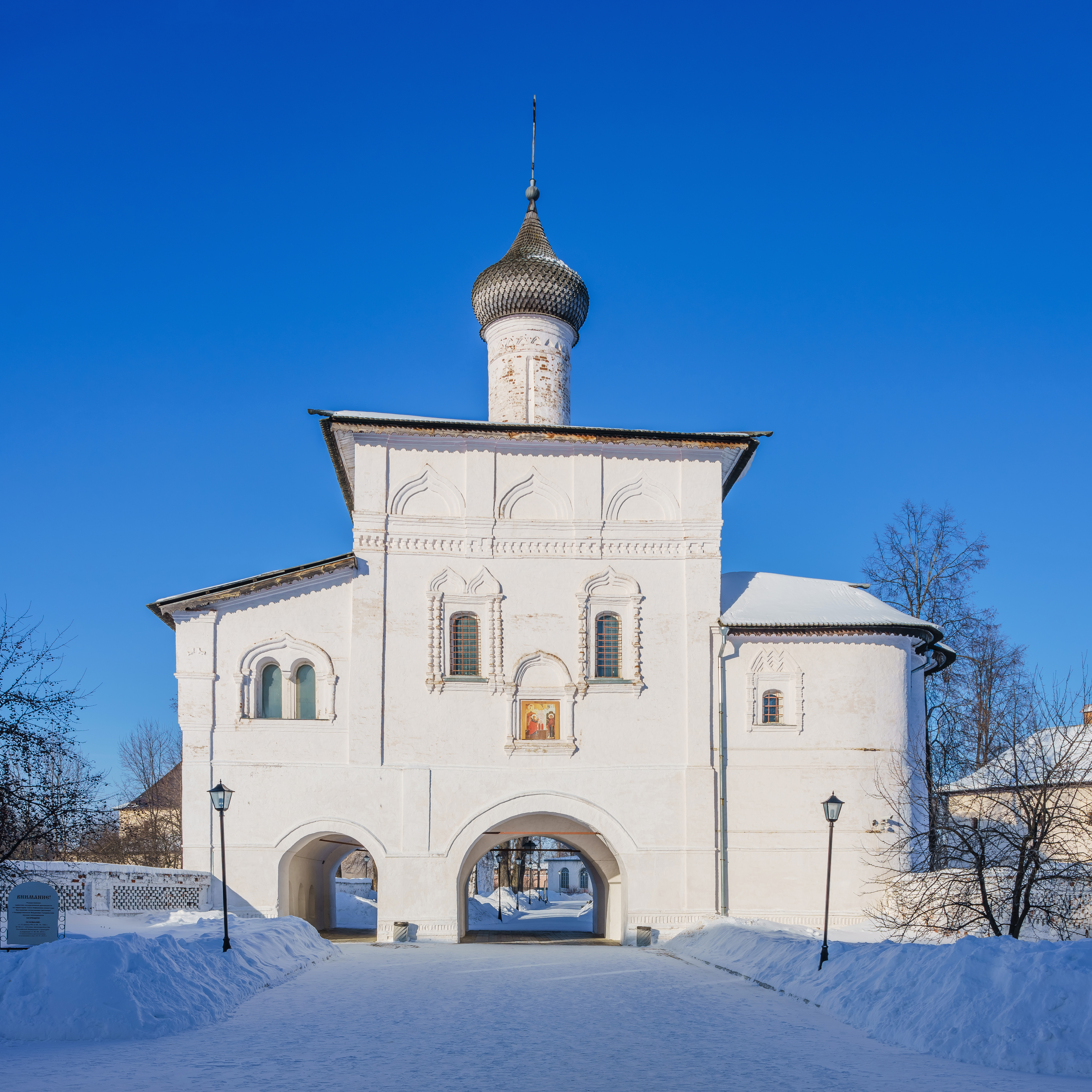
The Annunciation Church Over-the-gate, 2019

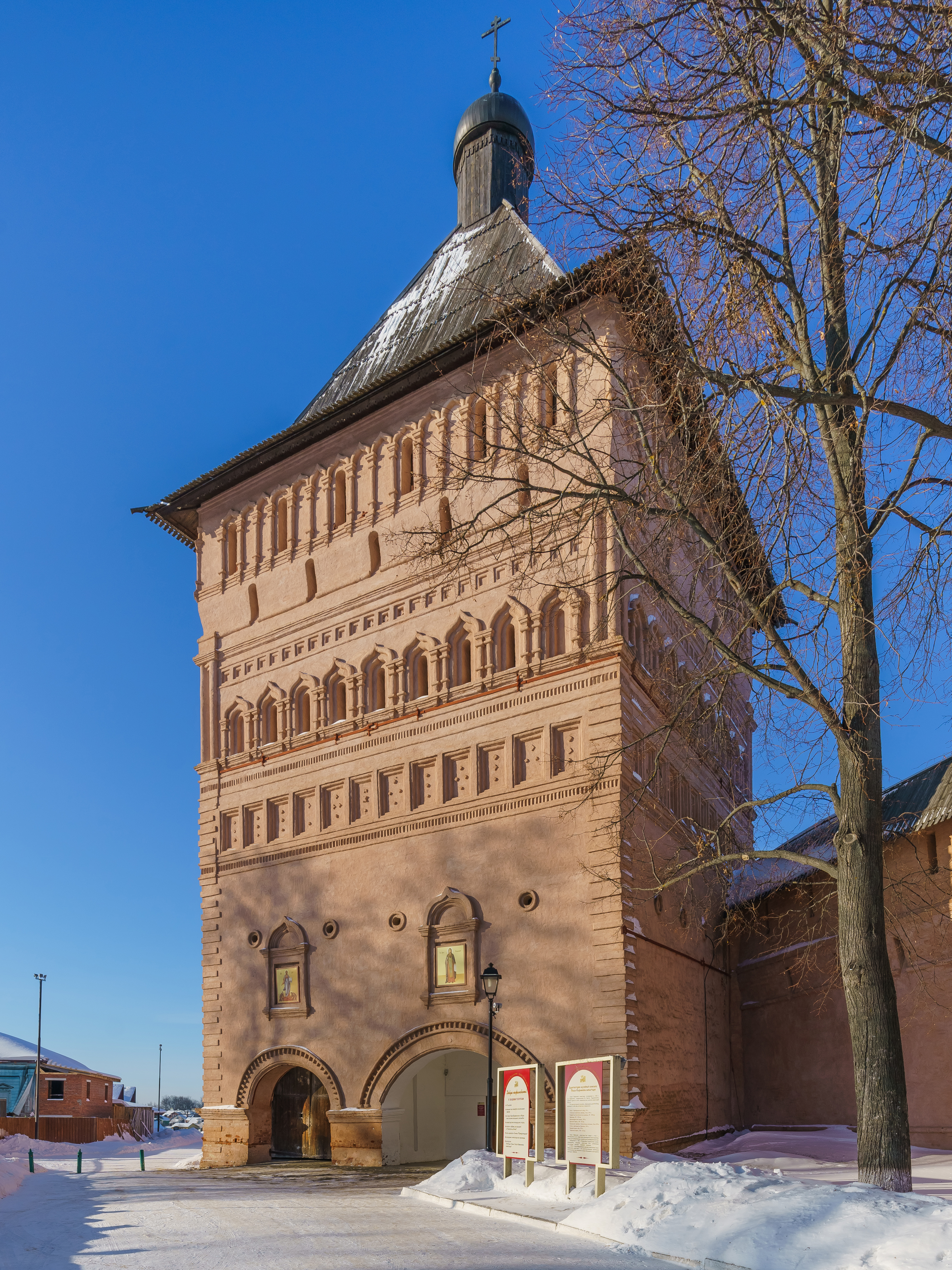
The fortification tower, 2019

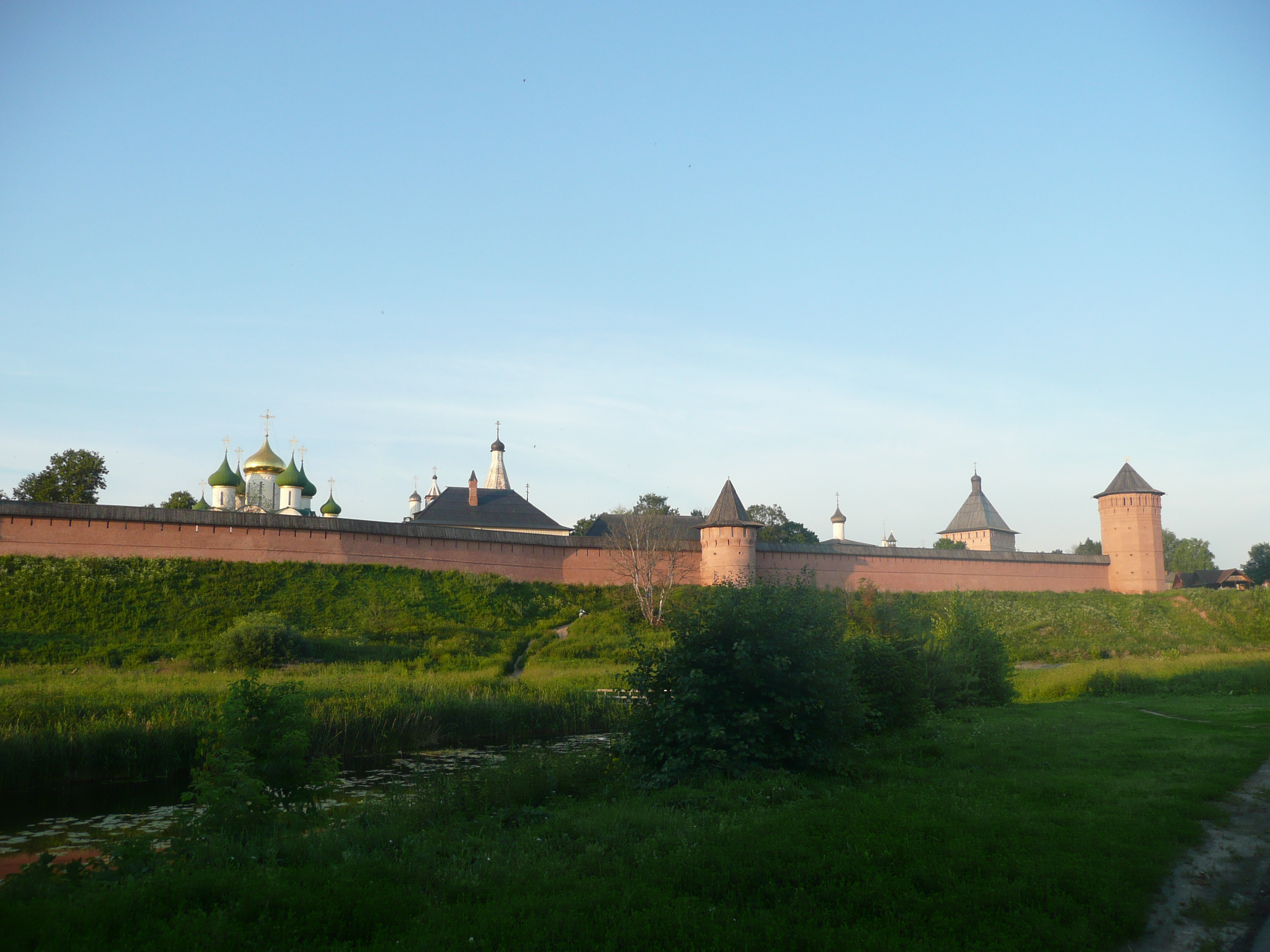
The view from the Kamenka Reiver

== Sources ==
- Richmond, Simon; et al. Lonely Planet: Russia and Belarus. p. 208. ISBN 1-74059-265-4.
- Voronin, N. N. (1983). Владимир. Боголюбово. Суздаль. Юрьев-Польской [Vladimir. Bogolubovo. Suzdal. Juriev-Polskoy] (in Russian). Moscow: Iskusstvo.
