= White Monuments of Vladimir and Suzdal =

UNESCO World Heritage Site
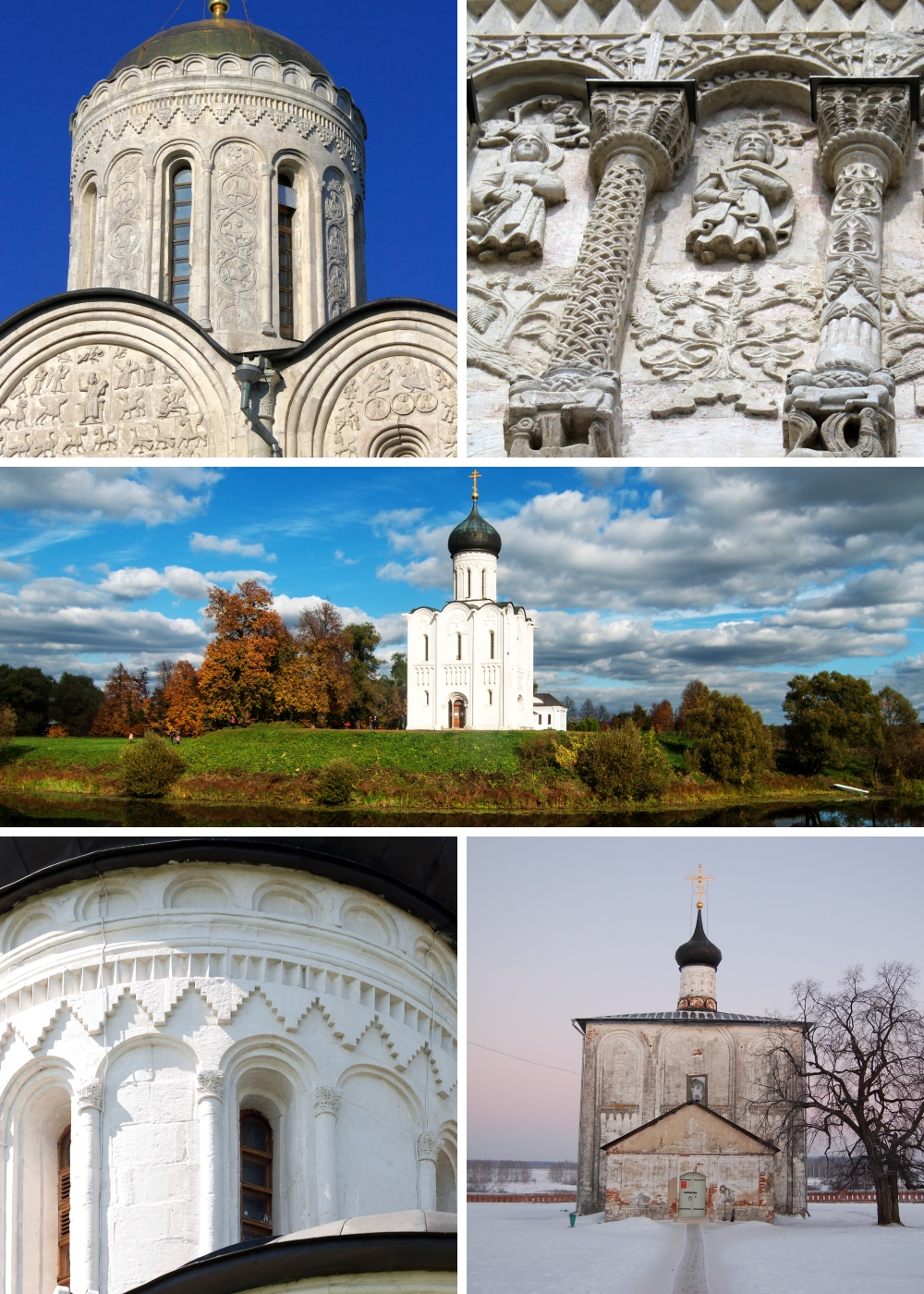

- Location within European Russia Location within Russia
- Location: Vladimir Oblast, Russia
- Includes: 1. Cathedral of the Assumption; 2. The Golden Gate; 3. The Prince Castle in Bogolyubovo (Cathedral of the Nativity of the Virgin and Staircase Tower of the Palace of Andrei Bogolyubsky); 4. Church of the Intercession on the River Nerl; 5. Cathedral of St. Demetrius; 6. Kremlin of Suzdal and Cathedral of the Nativity; 7. Monastery of Our Savior and St Euthymius; 8. Church of Sts Boris and Gleb
- Criteria: Cultural: (i), (ii), (iv)
- Reference: 633
- Inscription: 1992 (16th Session)
- Coordinates: 56°09′N 40°25′E

The White Monuments of Vladimir and Suzdal in Vladimir Oblast, Russia, have been designated as a UNESCO World Heritage Site. The patrimony embraces eight medieval limestone monuments of Zalesye from the late 12th and early 13th centuries. They include Russian Orthodox churches and a monastery, as well as a castle and gate. It is a serial property, which means it is made up of multiple monuments.

== Gallery ==
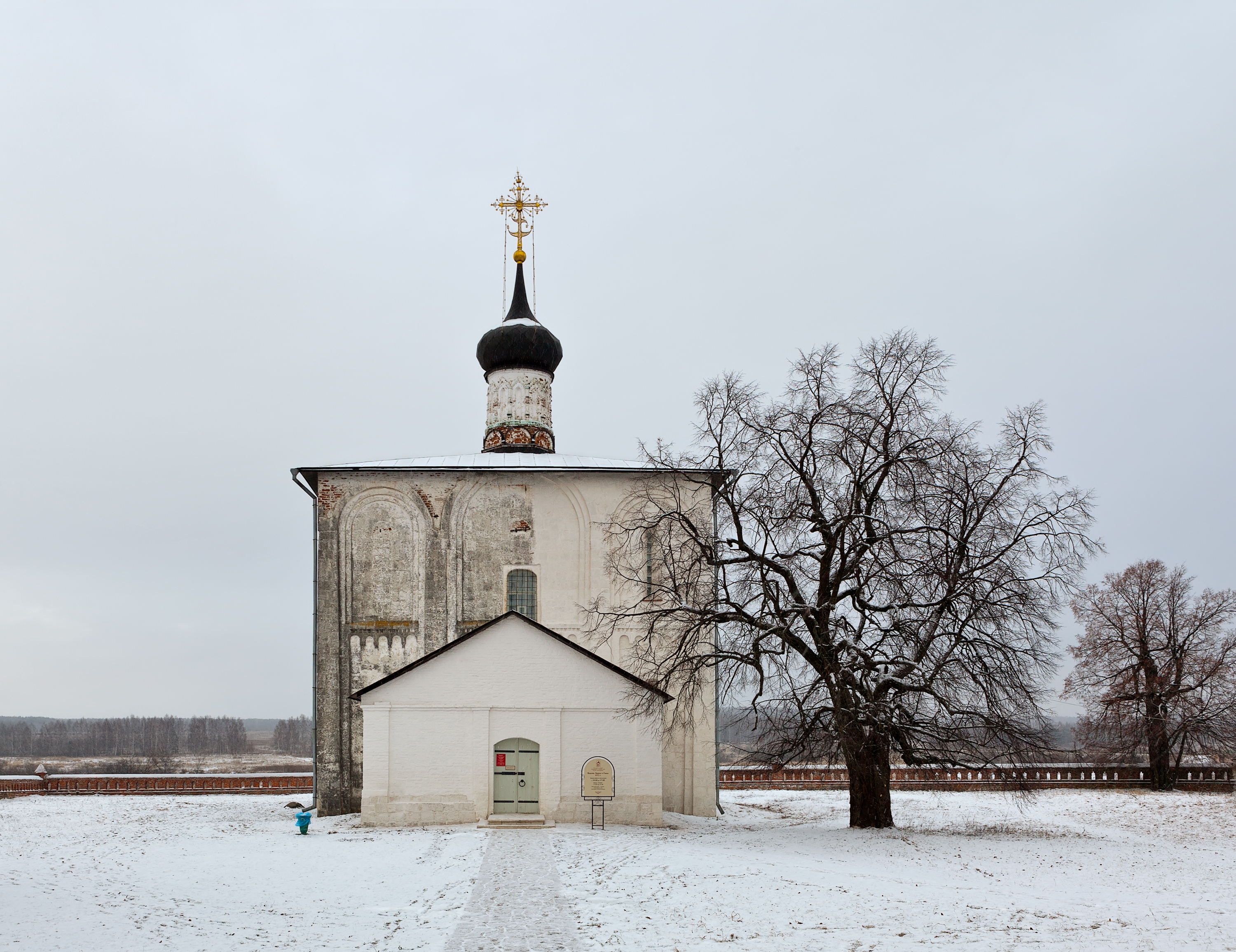
The Church of Boris and Gleb in Kideksha (1152, with later modifications)

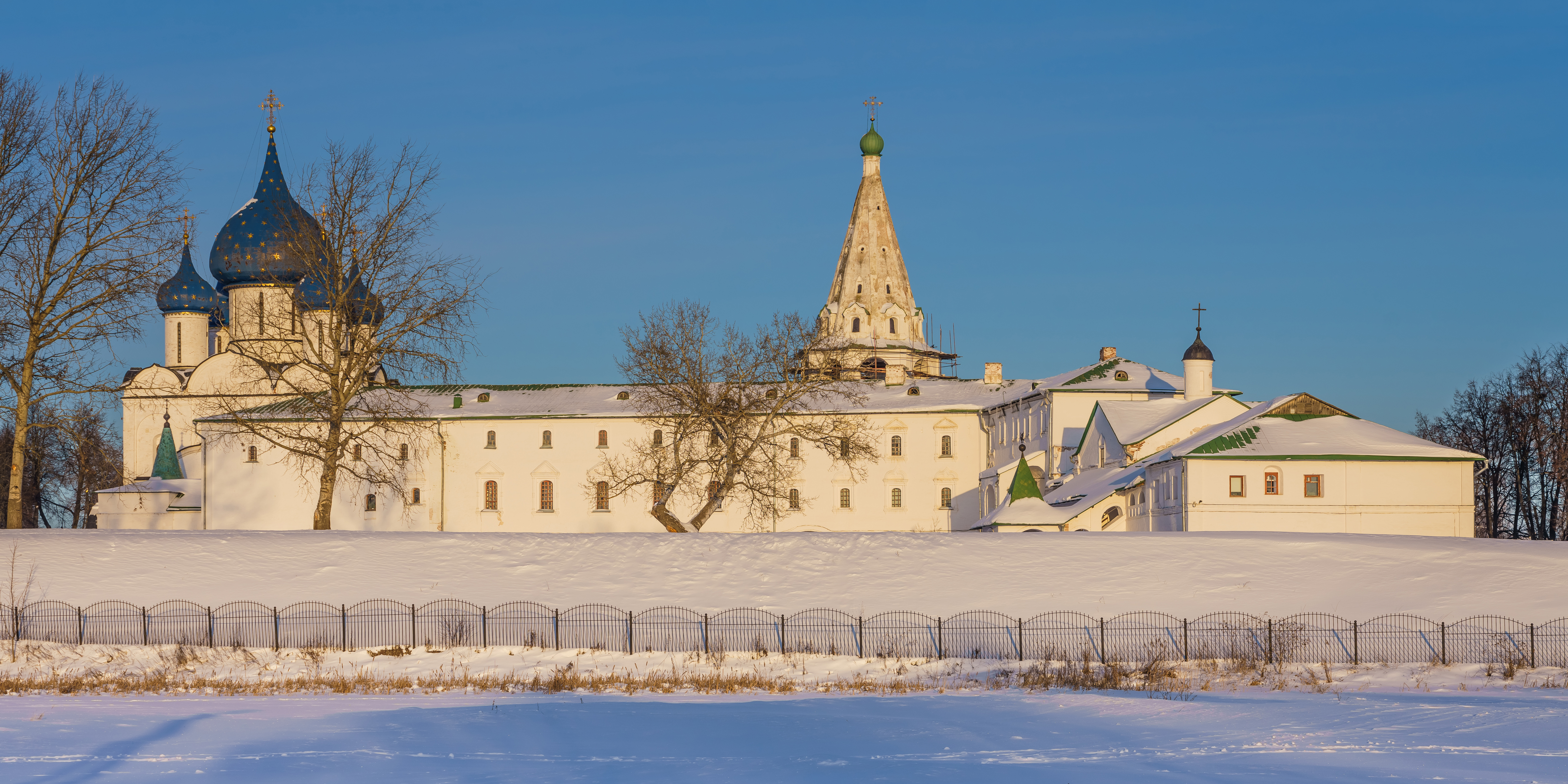
The Suzdal Kremlin with the Cathedral of the Nativity (1222-25, built into the 16th century)

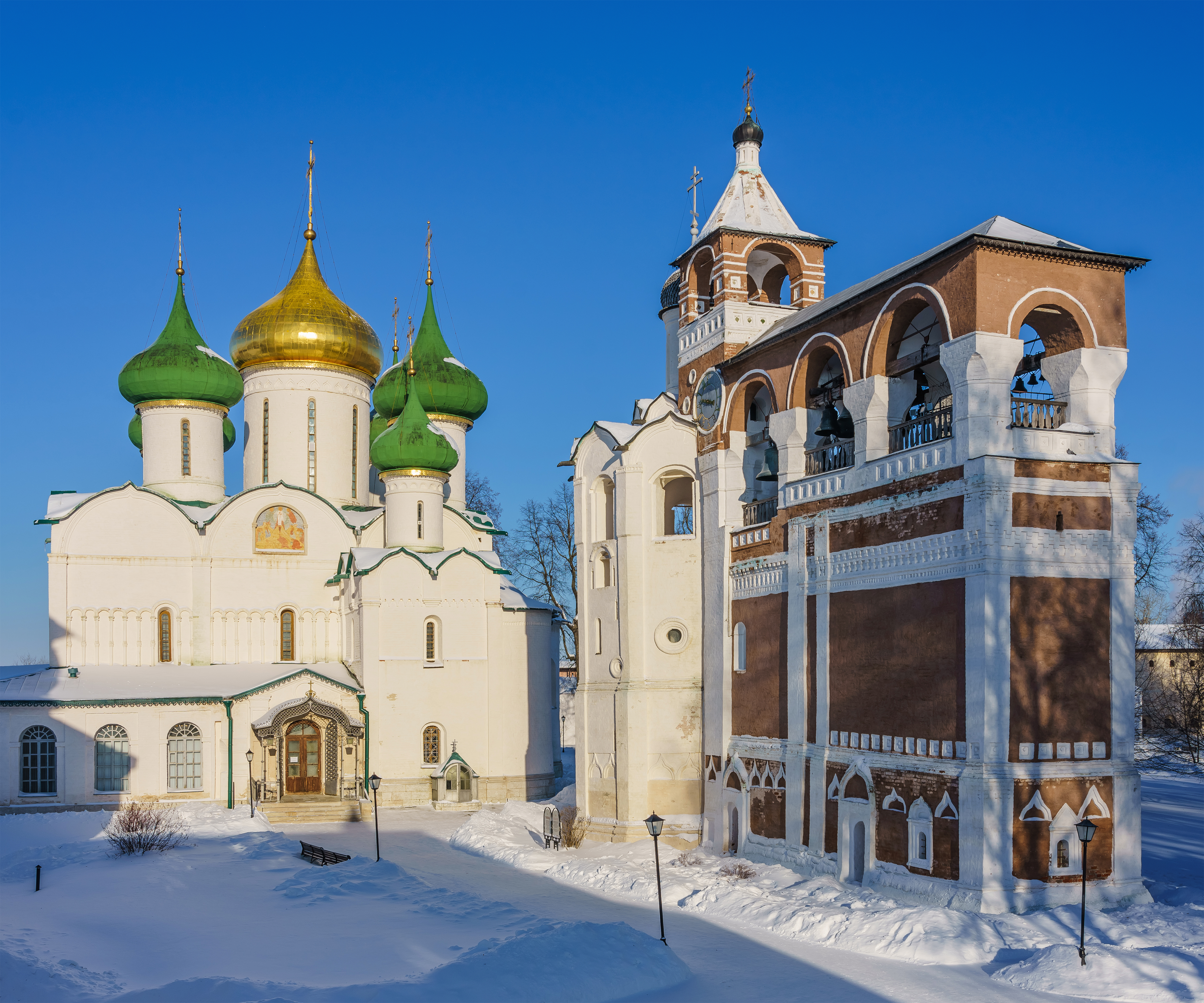
The Monastery of Saint Euthymius in Suzdal (mostly 16th century)

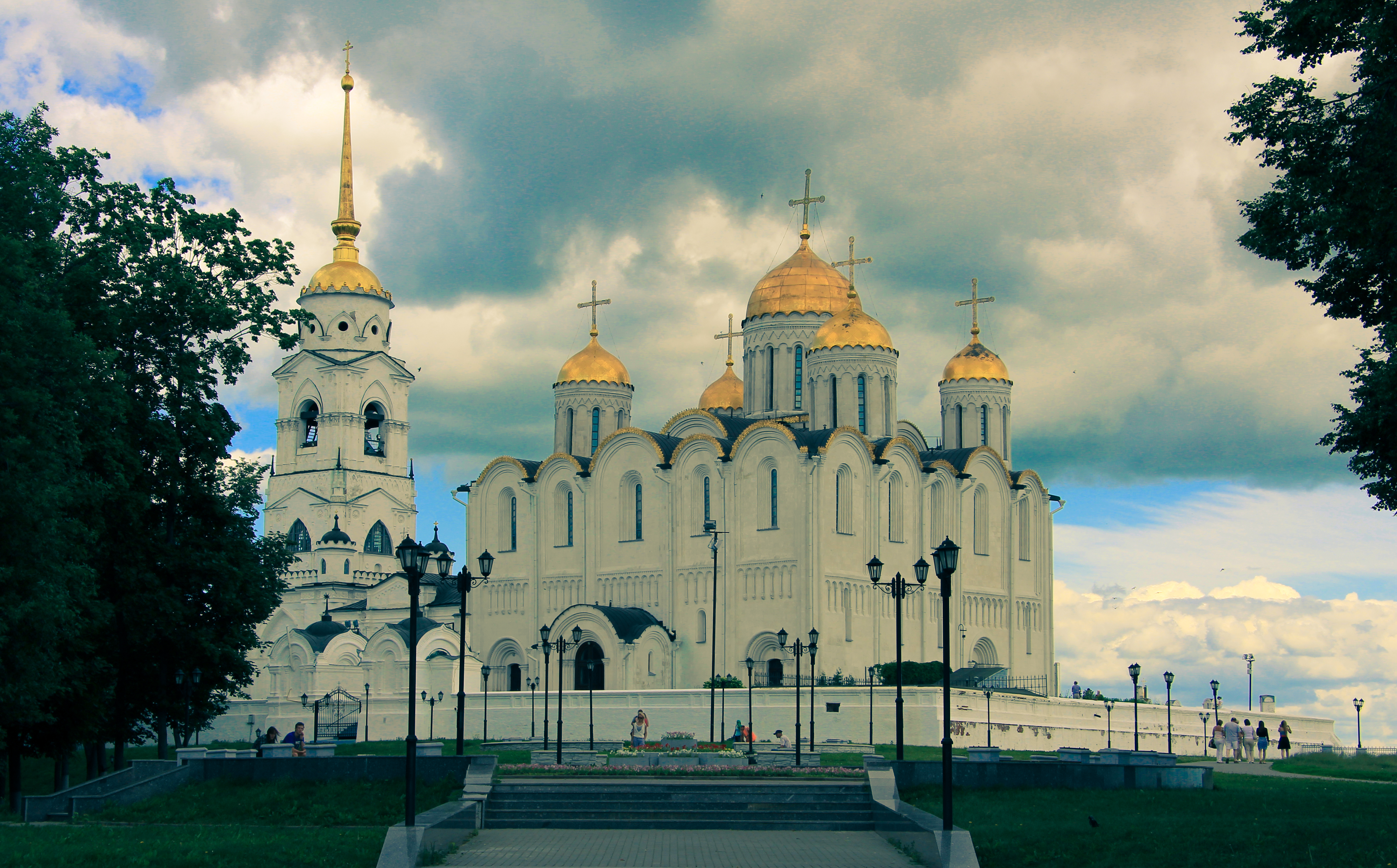
The Assumption Cathedral in Vladimir (1158-60, 1185-89)

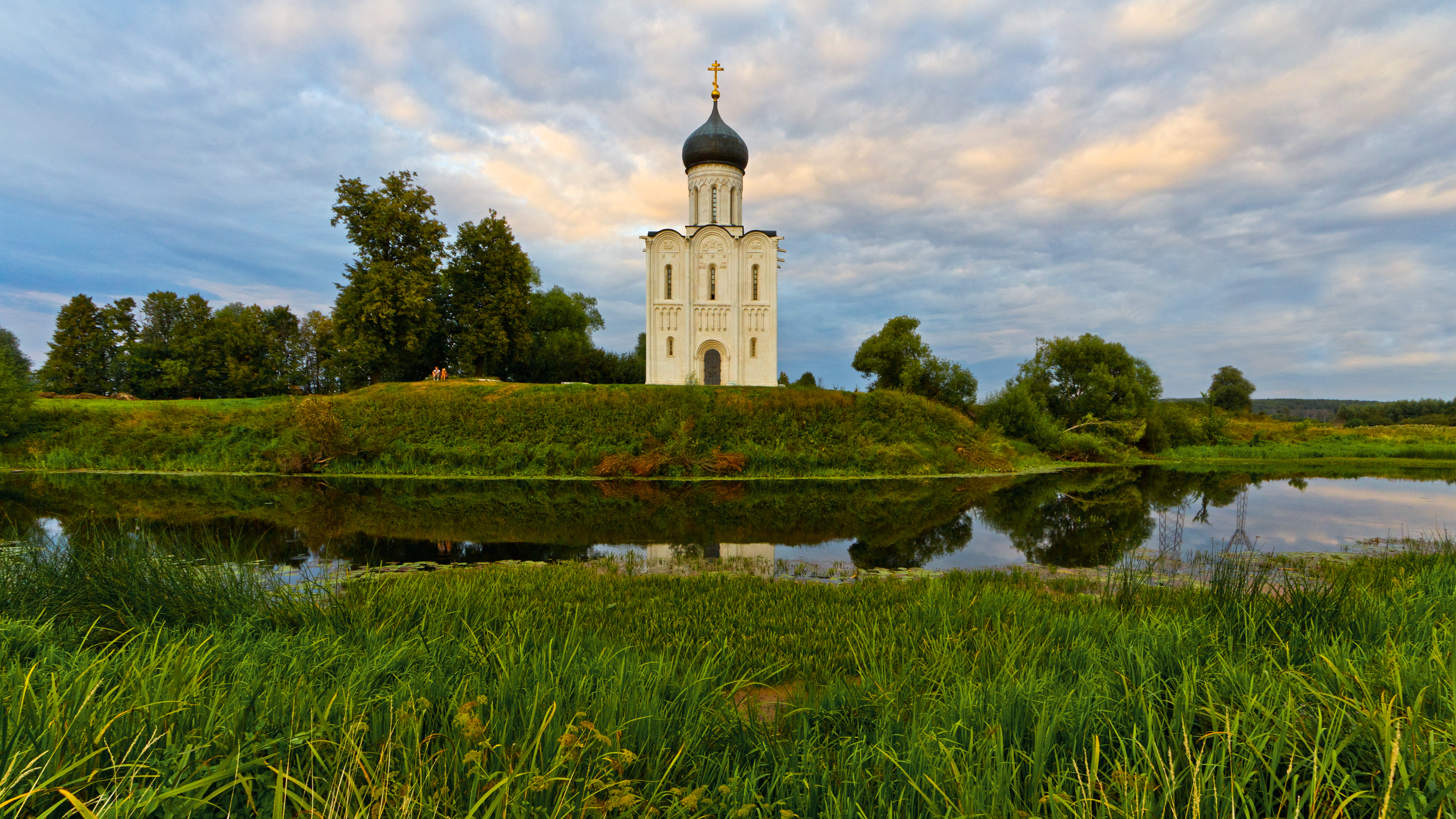
The Church of the Intercession on the Nerl in Bogolyubovo (1165)

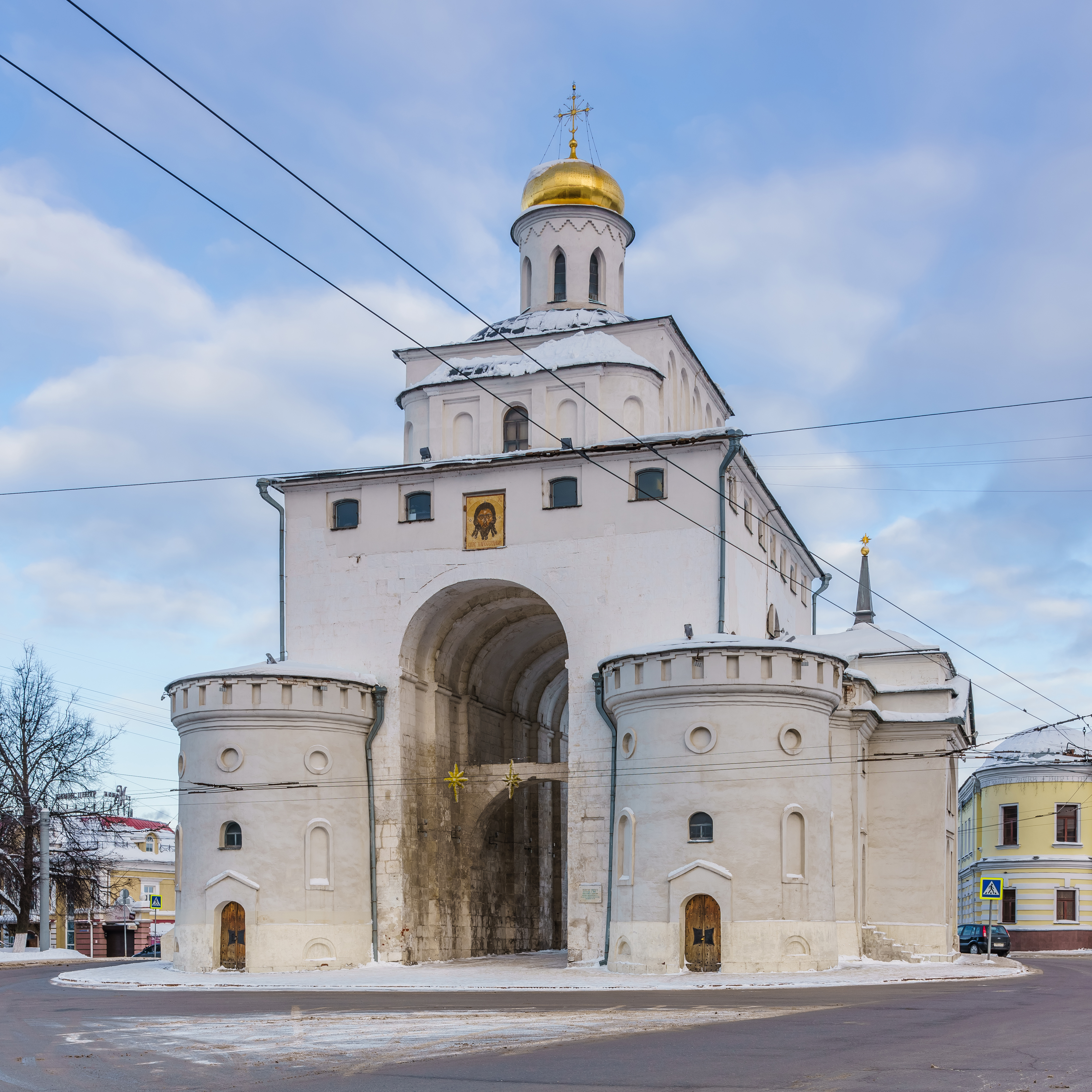
The Golden Gate in Vladimir (1158-64, with later modifications)

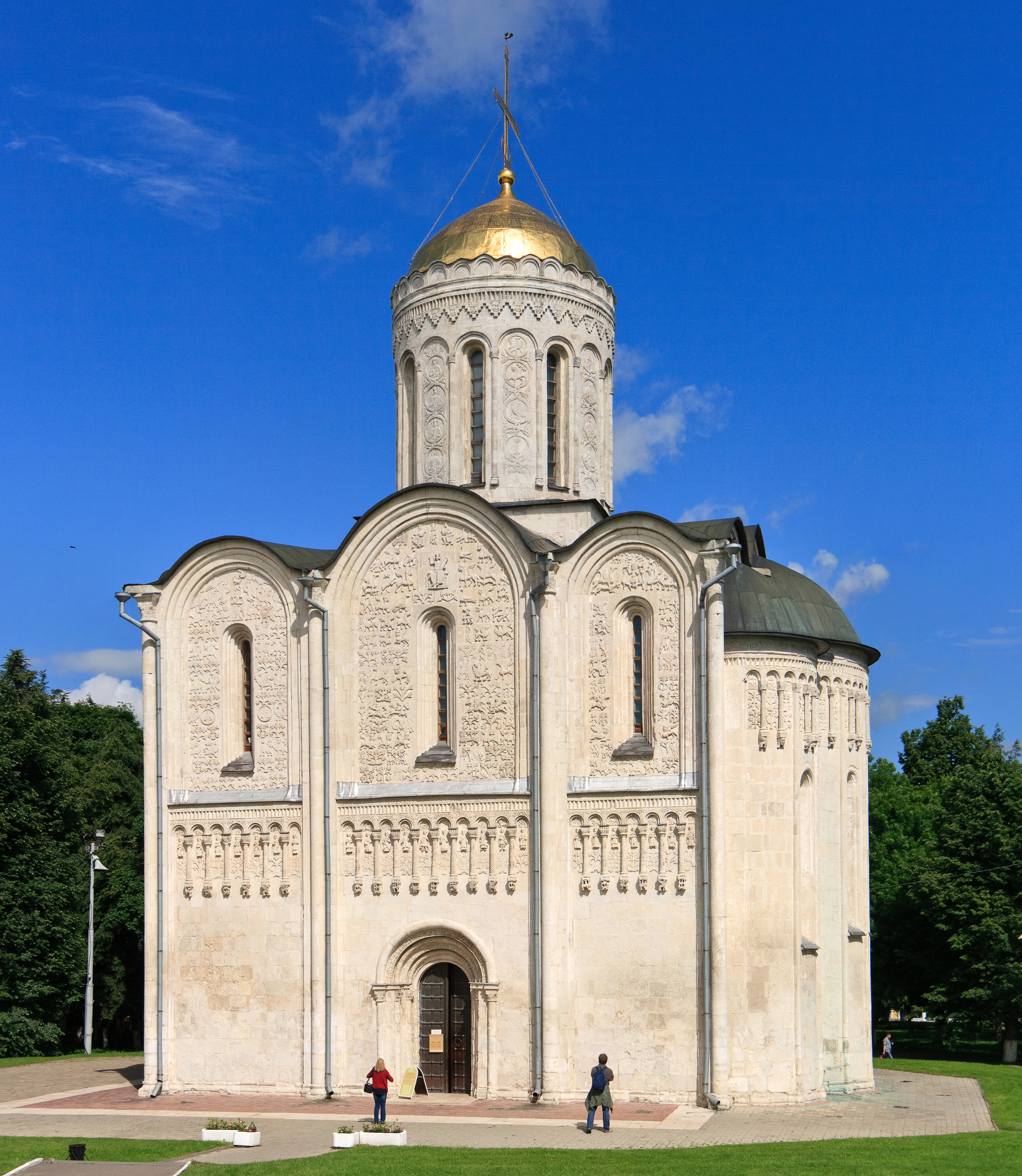
The Cathedral of Saint Demetrius in Vladimir (1194-97)

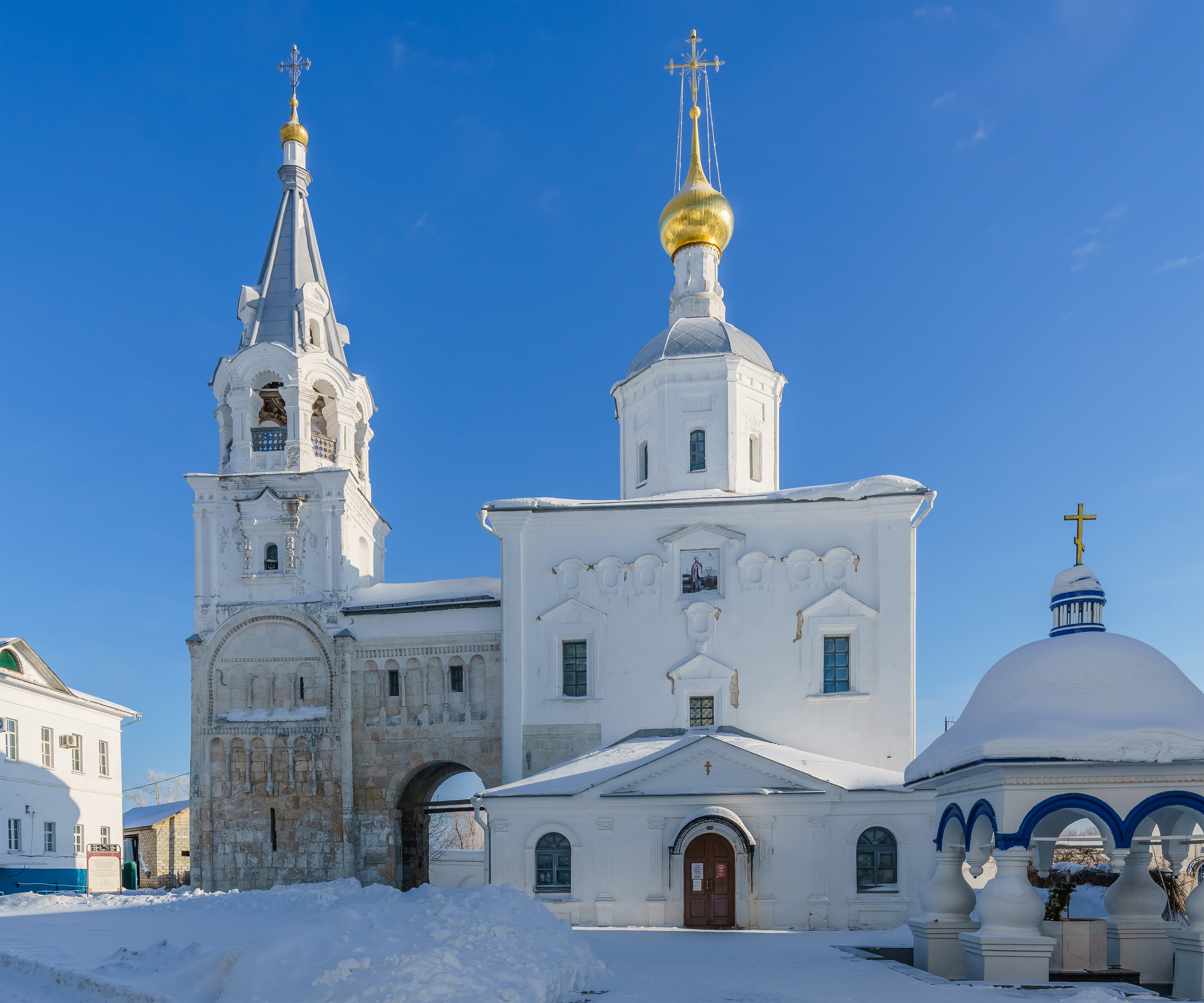
The castle of Andrew the Pious in Bogolyubovo (1158-65, with later modifications)
