= Vladimir-Suzdal school =

Russian art school

The Vladimir-Suzdal school (Russian: Владимиро-суздальская школа) was a Russian art school that developed in Vladimir-Suzdal in the 12th–14th centuries. It is known for its achievements in stone architecture, white-stone carving, icon painting and fresco. The White Monuments of Vladimir and Suzdal were included in the UNESCO World Heritage Site list in 1992.

== Early history ==
In 1113–1125, the Zalesskaya zemlya ("land behind the forests"), or Suzdalia, belonged to the princes of Chernigov and Pereyaslav, as well as Grand Prince Vladimir II Monomakh of Kiev. Prince Yuri Dolgorukiy, who left Kiev in 1150, founded the city of Pereyaslavl near Lake Pleshcheyevo. Unlike Pereyaslavl of the Kiev land, this city later received the name Zalessky. (Note: Pereyaslav was the name of Prince Yuri before baptism, and the letter later "ya" was dropped.)

In 1152–1160, the white-stone Transfiguration Cathedral was built in Pereyaslavl. It is well preserved and is a square four-column building with three apses, choirs and one massive dome. There is an assumption that due to hostile relations with Kiev, Prince Yuri turned for help to his loyal ally, the Galician prince Vladimir, and the team from Galich-Volynsky (Western: according to one version, Krakow, according to another, Hungarian masters) also worked in Pereyaslavl. This is evidenced by the Western European technique of laying limestone blocks (with a backfill of boulders on lime mortar). The Galician team also worked in Kideksha, the residence of Prince Yuri on the Nerl River near Suzdal. The Church of Boris and Gleb in Kideksha (1152) demonstrates features of Western European architecture. In addition to the laying technique, the elements of carved decor and the arcade belt are also notable, dating back to the arcades of Lombard (Lombard arched gallery) and southern German architecture. In 1108, Vladimir II Monomakh founded a fortress on a hill near the Klyazma River (the city's later name, Vladimir, comes from his name). Excavations of foundations of buildings that have not survived in Smolensk, Suzdal, and Vladimir indicate the work of the Kiev or Pereyaslavl artel.

The son of Yuri Dolgorukiy, Prince Andrey Bogolyubsky founded his own capital, Bogolyubovo, in 1158, on a bend in the Klyazma River. According to legend, in 1155, on his way from Kiev to Rostov, Andrey was carrying an icon of the Mother of God from Constantinople (later known as Our Lady of Vladimir). His horse stopped at the place where the Mother of God herself later appeared to the prince in a dream, ordering him to erect the icon in Vladimir. At the site of the apparition, the city of "Bogolyuby" arose, since "the Mother of God herself loved this place" (there are also other versions, for example, from the naming of many princes as "God-loving").

== Main architectural monuments ==
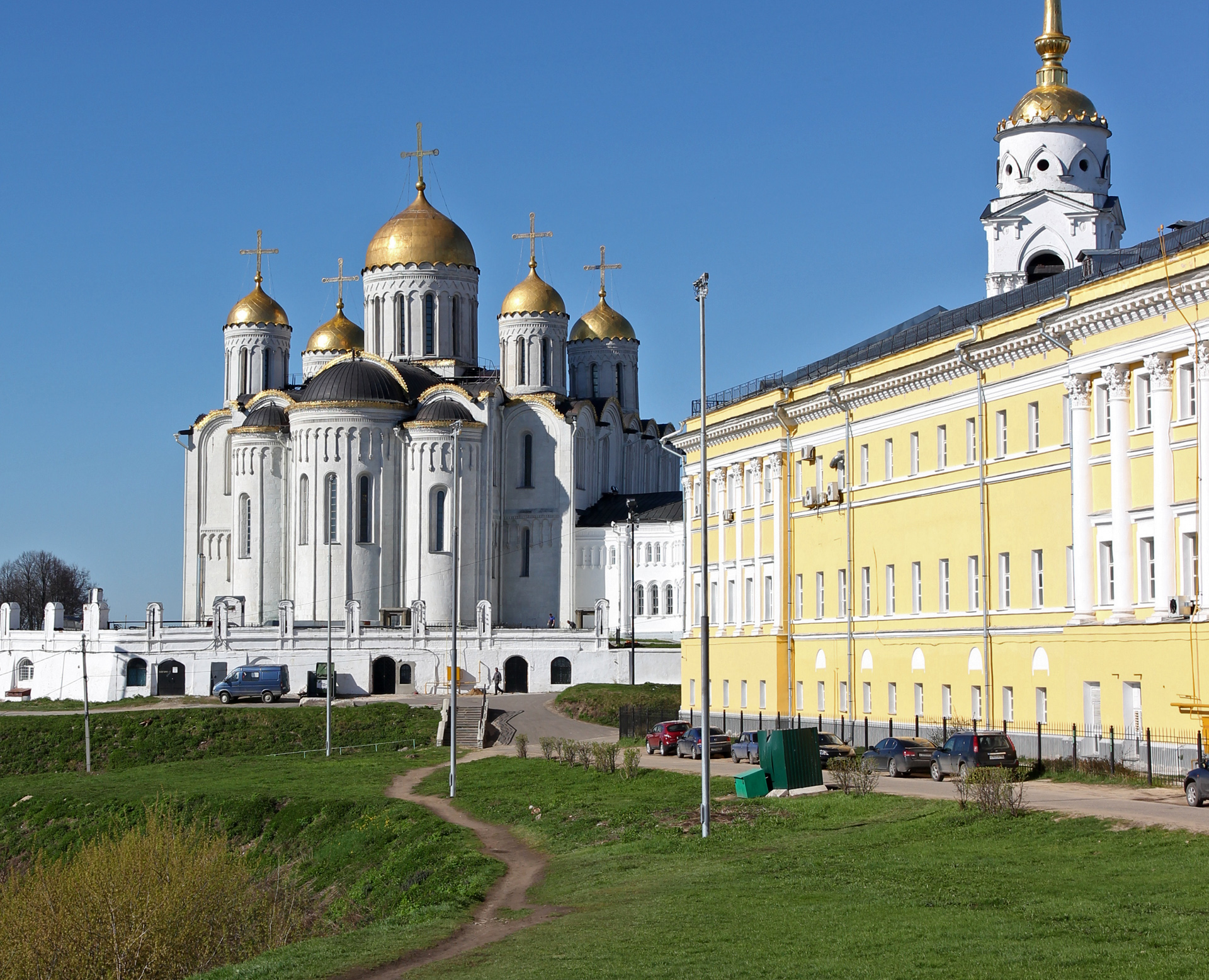
Cathedral of the Dormition of the Mother of God, Vladimir (1158–1189)

In 1164, Andrey Bogolyubsky built the Golden Gate in Vladimir, modelled on the Constantinople gate. It has survived to this day with significant changes. It was a fortress structure at the entrance to the city from the western side. In ancient times, the entrance arch was closed by oak gates covered with sheets of gilded copper (possibly with images using the gold-guided technique). The city wall also had other gates (silver, copper, Irina), which have not survived. The gates were crowned with a tiered gate church (a typical composition of Old Russian architecture). In 1469, the church was rebuilt by the Muscovite master Vasili Yermolin. At the end of the 18th century, side towers were added and the upper part was changed again.

The Dormition Cathedral in Vladimir was founded by Andrey Bogolyubsky in 1158. Standing high on a mountain, it is visible from afar. The origin of its architecture and masters, as well as compositional features, still cause scientific debate. According to the chronicle, Andrey received masters for construction "from the Germans". According to Vasily Tatishchev, the prince asked Holy Roman Emperor Frederick Barbarossa to send masters.

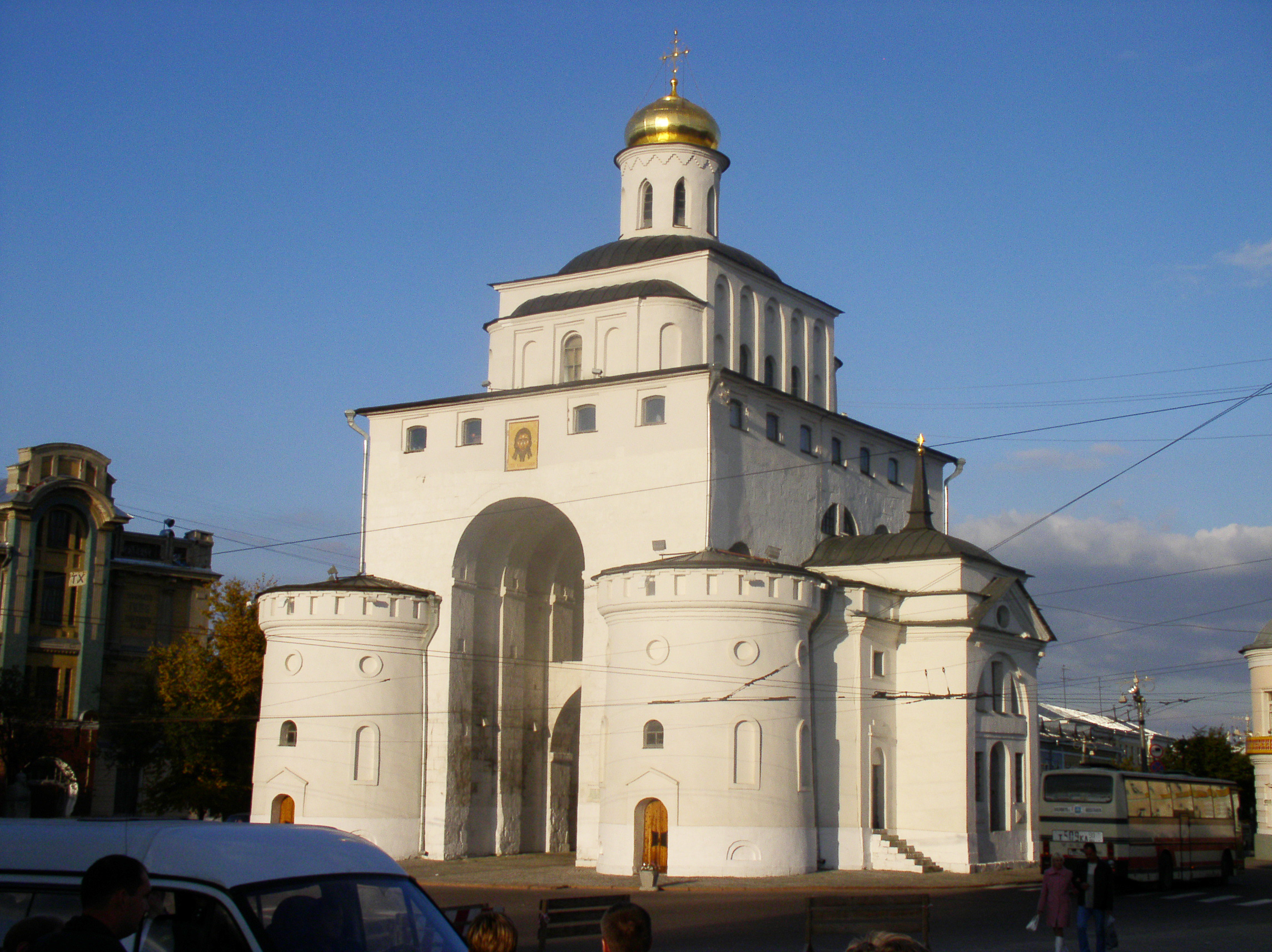
Golden Gate, Vladimir (1164)

At first, the cathedral was single-domed, six-columned, like an inscribed cross, with a zakomara-like completion of the facades. The details were unusual: perspective portals, stone carving, arcade belts, half-columns at the corners of the building instead of traditional pilasters, sculptural consoles. These details clearly demonstrate the characteristic techniques of the architects of Lombardy (Northern Italy), who, like the Thessalonians, were famous at that time for their construction skills. These regions were part of the empire of Frederick Barbarossa. The construction of the Assumption Cathedral was completed in 1160. In 1176–1212, under Vsevolod the Big Nest, the cathedral was surrounded by external galleries. Later, the external galleries encircling the main volume of the building would become one of the characteristic compositional features of the Vladimir-Suzdal school of architecture. After the reconstruction of 1185–1189, the cathedral became five-domed. The width of the three-nave part of the cathedral is 31 metres (102 ft), the height of the central vaults inside is about 22 metres (72 ft), the height to the top of the central dome is 35.5 metres (116 ft) (according to measurements by Nikolai Voronin).

The architecture of north-eastern Rus' was studied by the historian Nikolai Voronin. According to reconstructions created by Voronin, the appearance of the cathedral in 1158–1160 and 1185–1189, already with galleries and two tented towers, were typical of Lombard architecture in Northern Italy.

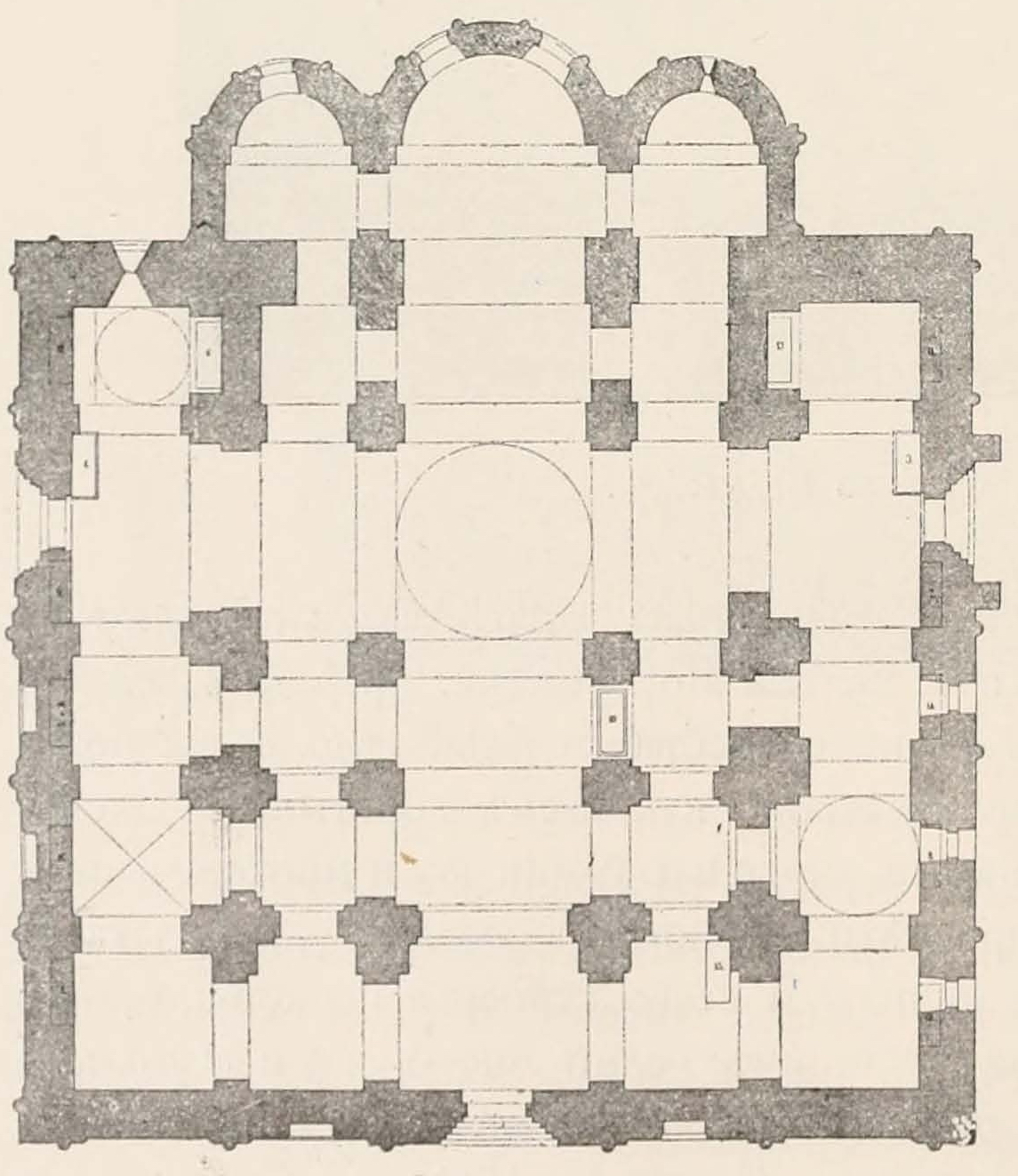
Plan of the Assumption Cathedral in Vladimir with bypass galleries

In the 1870s, the architect and restorer Nikolai Sultanov discovered that the zakomara ceilings of the Assumption Cathedral ended with typically Gothic gables hidden under later masonry. The researcher was so embarrassed by his discovery (it went beyond the boundaries of ideas about the Old Russian architecture of those years) that he hid this fact and did not mention it later. This circumstance served as one of the incentives for scientific research, including in Italy, by a researcher of Old Russian architecture, O. M. Ioannisyan. He established that similar elements are found in the cathedrals of Germany – in Worms, Mainz, but they all go back to a common source, namely, to the buildings erected by Lombard masters in Northern Italy – in Como, the residence of Emperor Frederick, and in Pavia. The closest prototype is the cathedral in Modena. A. I. Komech adhered to a similar concept. Between 1194 and 1197, also during the reign of Vsevolod III, a small single-domed Demetrius Church (consecrated in honor of Demetrius of Thessaloniki) was built in Vladimir. Its gilded dome has an ancient cross made of gilded copper with a weather vane in the form of a dove, which "sat" on its top. The third cathedral – the Nativity Monastery – was rebuilt in the 17th century. In the mid-19th century, the architectural researcher Nikolai Artleben dismantled the dilapidated building by that time and erected the cathedral anew, recreating the appearance of the 12th-century building. Under Soviet rule, in 1930, the cathedral was demolished. Now it has been recreated on the basis of a hypothetical reconstruction.

The remains of the palace of Andrey Bogolyubsky and fragments of the Cathedral of the Nativity of the Virgin Mary have been preserved in Bogolyubovo. The reconstruction of the cathedral, connected by passages with the palace buildings (part of the 12th-century staircase tower has been preserved), was developed in the 1950s by Nikolai Voronin. A ciborium with a bowl of holy water was installed on the square in front of the cathedral — a characteristic detail of Western European Romanesque architecture. The foliate capitals of the interior pillars were gilded. There is also information that the architect was ordered to be guided in his work by descriptions of the Temple of Solomon in Jerusalem.

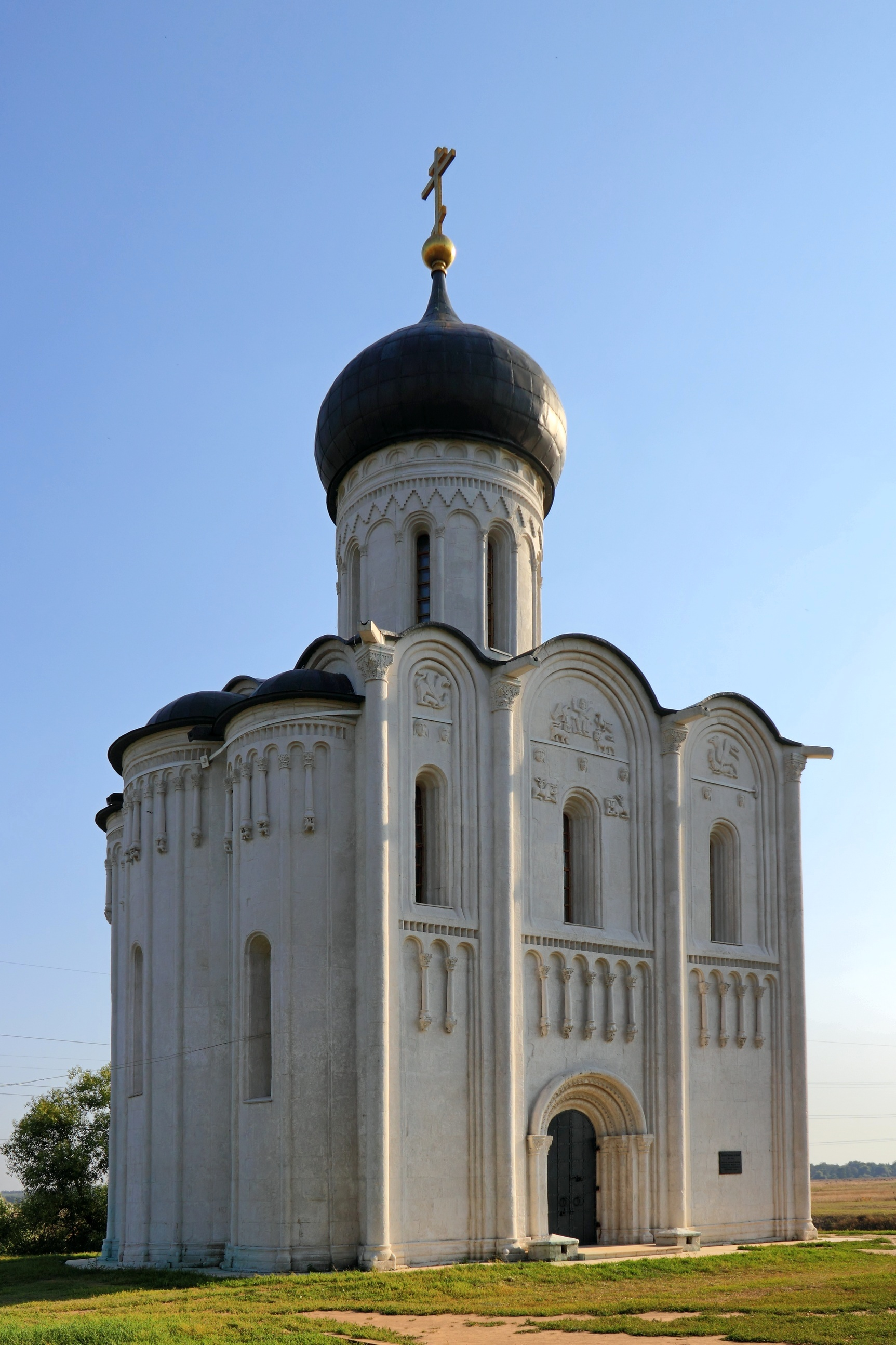
Church of the Intercession on the Nerl in Bogolyubovo

A kilometer from Bogolyubovo, at the confluence of the Nerl River with the Klyazma, in 1165 (or 1158), a single-domed Church of the Intercession on the Nerl was erected. Because of the danger of spring floods, the church was built on an artificial terrace with an embankment faced with stone slabs, a staircase, and lion figures on the sides. According to Nikolai Voronin's reconstruction, the temple was surrounded by galleries with arcades. The Church of the Intercession impresses with its exquisite proportions and the refined verticality of the composition.

Despite the fact that during the reign of Vsevolod the Big Nest, in particular during the reconstruction of the Assumption Cathedral into a five-domed building, "masters from the Germans" no longer worked (it is assumed that local masons participated), the architecture of Vladimir demonstrates a number of stable features, which allows us to define it as an original historical-regional school. While preserving the plan of the inscribed cross type (according to the Byzantine tradition), the cathedrals were supplemented with external galleries with an arcade-column belt on sculptural consoles. The belt divides the height of the wall in the "golden proportion". Columns with capitals decorate the corners of the buildings and perspective portals, similar to Western European Romanesque architecture. They are echoed by archivolts of a semicircular cross-section along the zakomaras of the upper part of the wall sections. A curb runs above the arcade belt, and the upper part of the wall above the curb is recessed by the so-called ebb.

The city of Suzdal is located 26 kilometres (16 mi) north of Vladimir. In 1149–1157, it was the capital of the Rostov-Suzdal principality. In Suzdal, a Kievan artel of craftsmen, commissioned by Vladimir Monomakh and the local bishop Ephraim, erected a four-pillar, single-domed cathedral in the name of the Dormition of the Virgin Mary. The cathedral was built of plinth and mortar. Around 1148, a new white-stone church was built in its place. In 1222–1225, under Yuri II of Vladimir (son of Vsevolod III "the Big Nest"), a third three-domed stone cathedral in the name of the Nativity of the Virgin Mary was erected on the remains of the previous one. In 1528–1530, the collapsed upper part of the building was rebuilt from brick, turning the cathedral into a five-domed one. With some changes (the shapes of the domes were significantly altered), this building has survived to the present day.

The temple, like the Vladimir buildings, has an arcade-columnar belt, but it does not protrude, but is cut into the wall - in the form of a series of niches, which indicates the loss of tectonic qualities and the strengthening of the decorative principle. This phenomenon is explained, in particular, by the fact that the cathedral was built not by Western, but by local masters.

== White-stone carving ==
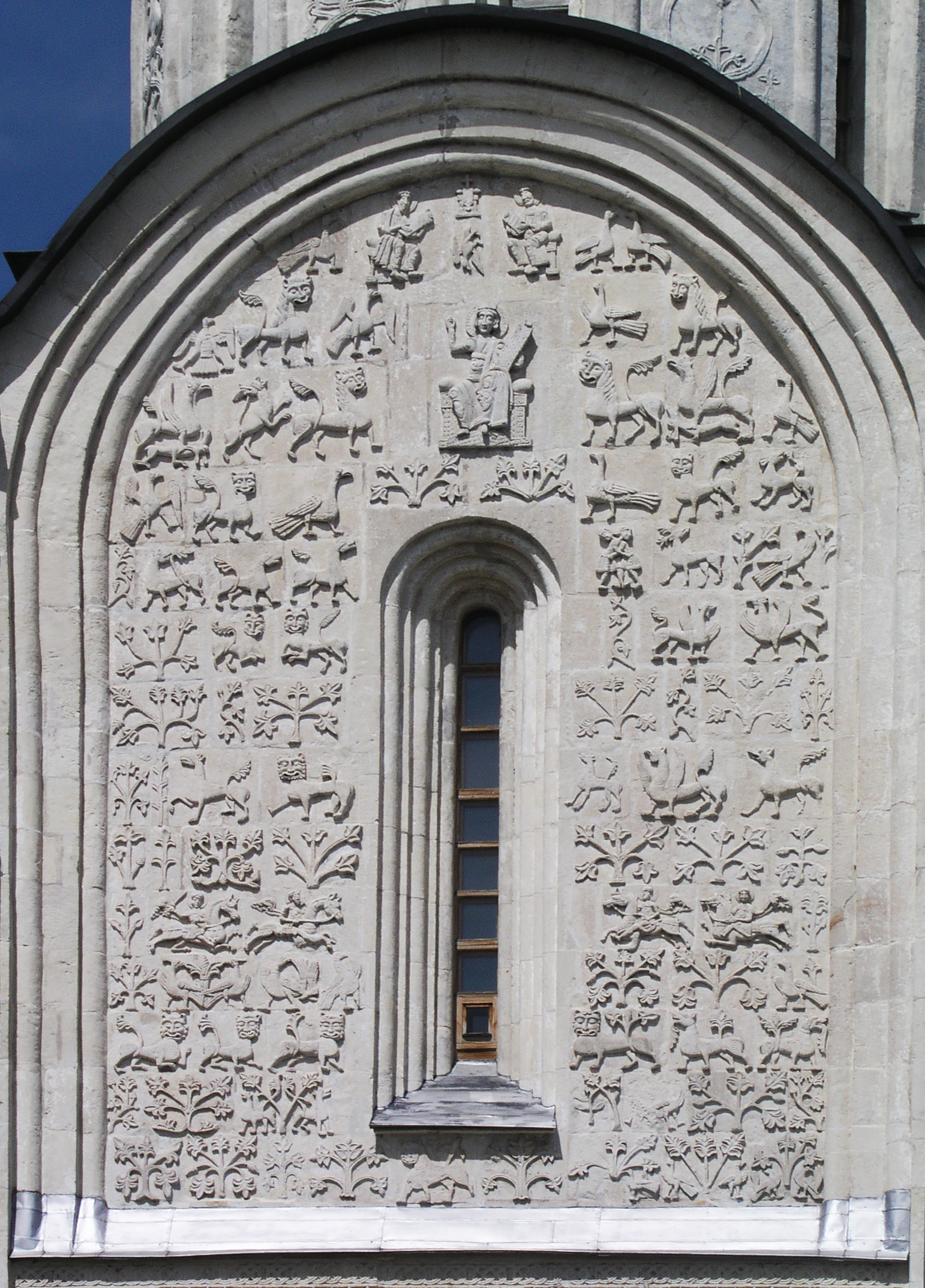
St. Demetrius Cathedral in Vladimir. 1194–1197. The southern facade panel with the figure of David the Psalmist and "earthly creatures"

In addition to architectural innovations, the Vladimir-Suzdal school is notable for its original white stone carving art. New construction techniques prompted craftsmen to use new decorative techniques that were different from Byzantine ones (brick patterns and inclusion of majolica tiles and plates in brickwork).

The Cathedral of Saint Demetrius in Vladimir is especially famous for its carved decoration. White stone carving covers the upper part of the wall sections, the arcade belt, the archivolts of the portals and the piers of the dome drum like a continuous carpet. About a thousand stones are decorated with relief decor: plant motifs, woven ornaments, figures of lions with "blooming" tails, which were called "cats" for their peaceful appearance, griffins, birds, and galloping horsemen. Some motifs are surprisingly close to the Western European "abstract animal ornament". Among the reliefs are images of King Solomon on the lion throne (possibly as the builder of the Jerusalem Temple), princes Boris and Gleb, Vsevolod III, "Alexander the Great's flight to heaven". On the southern facade of the Church of the Intercession on the Nerl there is an image of King David the Psalmist.

The reliefs were carved on finished masonry, although "blanks" made in advance at the construction site are not excluded, since the images, ignoring the seams, freely "flow" from one stone to another. The columns and archivolts of the portals, arcade belt and capitals are covered with small flat-relief carving with a deepening of the background. In wood, such carving is called obronnaya.

In 1152, northwest of Vladimir, Yuri Dolgoruky founded the city of Yuryev-Polsky (or Polskoy, from the prince's name with the addition of the definition "in the field"). In 1230–1234, Saint George Cathedral was built in Yuryev-Polsky. It is a small four-pillar temple with one dome. The temple had three vestibules, one of which, the western one, was two-story (the prince's choir was located in its upper part). The pyramidal silhouette of the cathedral was emphasized by zakomaras at the base of the dome. In the 15th century, a significant part of the building collapsed. In 1471, by the efforts of Vasili Yermolin, by order of Grand Prince Ivan III, the cathedral was restored, but lost its original proportions and became much more squat. At the same time, the architect, understanding the significance of the historical structure, did not replace the collapsed parts of the building with brickwork, but collected all the white stone blocks and the reliefs that decorated them. However, without having any sketches of the temple or its exact plan, he placed most of the stones arbitrarily, mixing up the subjects, which resulted in the formation of a kind of "rebus" of white-stone reliefs.

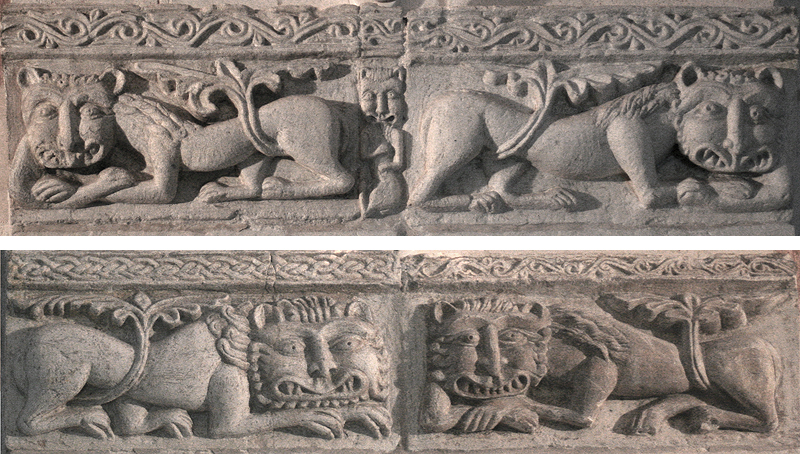
Cats reliefs in the interior of the Cathedral of St. Demetrius

The so-called Sviatoslav cross, a multi-part icon carved from stone depicting the Crucifixion of Jesus with those standing before him, was especially revered by believers for centuries. After the reconstruction of 1471, the relief was located in the central zakomara of the western or northern walls of the cathedral. It is currently exhibited in St. George's Cathedral and is part of the collection of the Yuryev-Polsky Historical, Architectural and Art Museum. Tradition associates the erection of the cross with Prince Sviatoslav III of Vladimir. According to a number of researchers, the immediate reason for the creation of the cross was the circumstances of the prince's campaign against Volga Bulgaria in 1220.

The reconstruction of the temple was developed by Voronin. The historian and theorist of architecture Georgy Vagner compared the composition of the cathedral with Zion, a grandiose reliquary, revealing the iconographic program of glorification of the Vladimir princes in the general hierarchy of the universe with the zones of "earth" and "heaven" similar to the lower and upper worlds in icon painting.

The lower tier of reliefs represented the blooming earth, above it – symbols of the princely house and the Church. The arcade-column belt of the temple was decorated with images of the heavenly patrons of the Vladimir princes. The reliefs in the zakomaras represented biblical scenes. The beauty of the nature of the Vladimir land is glorified by fabulous birds, lions, dragons. Unlike the reliefs of the Assumption and Demetrius Cathedrals in Vladimir, which have a more tectonic character, the finest stone carving of the cathedral in Yuryev-Polsky is a-tectonic – the pattern covers the planes of the walls with a solid carpet, without taking into account the seams of the stonework and the design of architectural details. The arcade-column belt has also lost its visual tectonicity; it is deepened into the thickness of the wall. In these features, researchers are inclined to see not only a later stage in the development of the art of white stone carving, but also the growing role of folk tradition - a connection with folklore, motifs and techniques of peasant carving and painting on wood.

== See also ==
- Moscow school
