= Krasilovo =

Krasilovo Красилово
- Village
- Location within Vladimir Oblast Location within Russia
- Coordinates: 56°11′N 38°46′E
- Country: Russia
- Region: Vladimir Oblast
- District: Kirzhachsky District
- Time zone: UTC+3:00

Krasilovo (Russian: Красилово) is a rural locality (a village) in Gorkinskoye Rural Settlement, Kirzhachsky District, Vladimir Oblast, Russia. The population was 2 as of 2010. There are 4 streets.

== Geography ==
Krasilovo is located on the Sherna River, 12 km northwest of Kirzhach (the district's administrative centre) by road. Yeltsy is the nearest rural locality.
