= Samoryadovka =

Location
- Country: Russia

Physical characteristics
- Mouth: Ucha
  - coordinates: 56.0772°N 37.5302°E
- Length: 13 km (8.1 mi)

Basin features
- Progression: Ucha→ Klyazma→ Oka→ Volga→ Caspian Sea

The Samoryadovka (Russian: Саморядовка) is a river in Dmitrovsky and Mytishchinsky Districts of Moscow Oblast, Russia. It is a left tributary of the Ucha.

The Samoryadovka is 13 kilometers (8.1 mi) in length. It flows through the work settlement of Nekrasovsky and the villages of Laryovo and Lyskovo, and then flows into the Ucha at the village of Sukharevo.
