= Nerekhta =

Nerekhta may refer to:

- Nerekhta UGV
- Nerekhta Urban Settlement, a municipal formation within Nerekhtsky Municipal District into which the town of oblast significance of Nerekhta, Russia is incorporated
- Nerekhta (inhabited locality), several inhabited localities in Russia
- Nerekhta (river), a river in Vladimir Oblast, Russia
