= Church of the Intercession on the Nerl =

12th-century church in Russia

- Церковь Покрова на Нерли
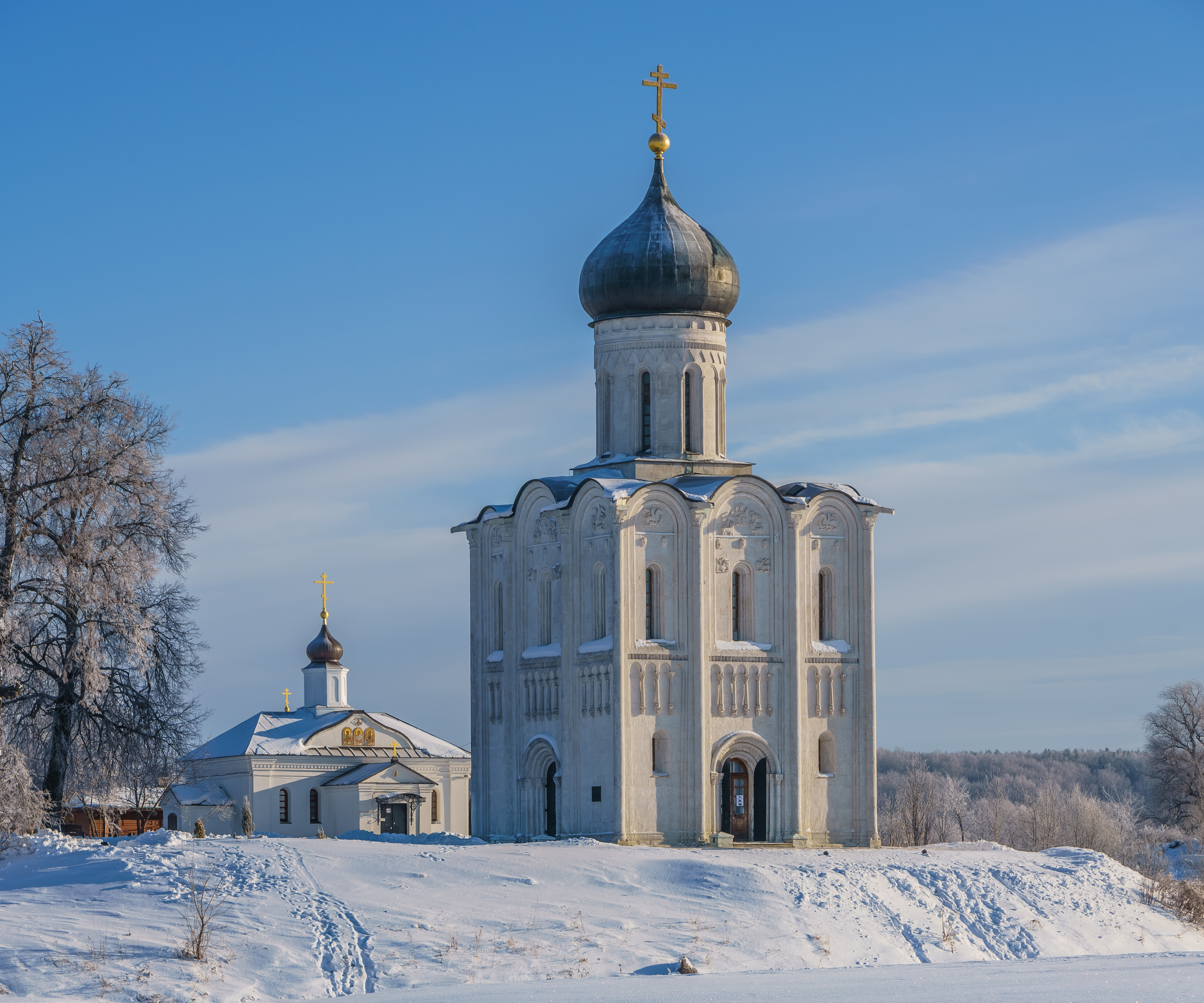
- The church in winter. The Church of the Three Holy Hierarchs, built in 1885, is on the left in the background

Religion
- Affiliation: Russian Orthodox
- Ecclesiastical or organisational status: Russian Orthodox Eparchy of Vladimir

Location
- Location: Bogolyubovo, Vladimir Oblast, Russia
- Interactive map of Church of the Intercession on the Nerl
- Coordinates: 56°11′46.5″N 40°33′41.0″E

Architecture
- Architect: Russian architects
- Type: Vladimir-Suzdal school
- Style: Cross-domed church
- Completed: 1158 or 1165

The Church of the Intercession on the Nerl (Russian: Церковь Покрова на Нерли, romanized: Tserkov Pokrova na Nerli) is a Russian Orthodox church and a symbol of medieval Russia. It is a monument of the Vladimir-Suzdal school of architecture. It is one of the oldest and best-preserved examples of a single-domed church building in Russia, a type that was widespread in Russian architecture.

Dedicated to the Intercession of the Theotokos, the church is situated at the confluence of the Nerl and the Klyazma in Bogolyubovo, 13 km (8.1 mi) north-east of the medieval princely seat of Vladimir. For centuries, the memorial church greeted everyone approaching the palace at Bogolyubovo. In spring, the area would flood, and the church appeared as if floating on water. The church itself has not been substantially altered, with only the dome's shape being slightly changed, and the addition of porch-galleries in the 12th century, which were rebuilt in the 18th century and then demolished. The walls are still covered with 12th-century stone carvings.

== History ==
The church was commissioned by Andrei Bogolyubsky (r. 1157–1174), the grand prince of Vladimir. The craftsmen were likely brought from western Russia, and Andrei founded the Vladimir-Suzdal school of architecture during his reign.

According to Janet L. B. Martin, it was commissioned by Andrey in 1165 to commemorate a victory over the Volga Bulgars, and in memory of one of his sons who died in the battle. The building is constructed in white stone, and has one dome and four columns in the interior. Its proportions are elongated on purpose to make its outline seem slimmer, although this architectural solution restricts its use in holding services.

The Church of the Intercession on the Nerl represents the heyday of the Vladimir-Suzdal principality under Andrei Bogolyubsky. At that time, Vladimir was transformed and the princely residence of Bogolyubovo, with white-stone fortifications, a princely palace and the Church of the Nativity of the Virgin Mary appearing next to it. In 1158–1165, Andrei Bogolyubsky's construction team created a number of remarkable white-stone buildings. His church-building program is comparable to the work of Yaroslav the Wise, who rebuilt Kiev a century earlier.

A site was chosen for the Church of the Intercession, just over a kilometer from the princely palace at the confluence of the Nerl and Klyazma (later the mouth shifted to the south, leaving behind an oxbow lake). The mouth of the Nerl was located at the intersection of important trade river routes and served as a gateway to the Vladimir land: here, ships turned to the prince's residence, from here a panorama of Bogolyubovo with the prince's palace and Vladimir unfolded. The church was to become the forward element of the representative ensemble, its gate monument.

Chronicle evidence about the Church of the Intercession is very scanty. The Brief Vladimir Chronicle says: "and then Andrei Yuryevich came from Kiev and created a Bogolyubny city [...] and erected two stone churches." "And he erected a temple for her on the Klyazma River, two stone churches in the name of the Holy Mother of God," reports the First Novgorod Chronicle. Obviously, one of the churches mentioned is the Intercession. Finally, The Life of Prince Andrei Bogolyubsky, a source from 1702, contains more detailed information. From the text it follows that the temple was built in one season in memory of Izyaslav Andreyevich, the prince's son, who died from wounds after a campaign in Volga Bulgaria.

The church was consecrated in honor of the feast of the Intercession of the Virgin Mary. However, surviving sources do not mention the establishment of the feast on the initiative of Andrei Bogolyubsky, and in Russian chronicles that refer to the pre-Mongol period, the church is spoken of as dedicated not to any specific feast, but to the Virgin Mary. Consequently, this feast could have been established later (the first mentions of it date back to the 13th century), and in this case the church could have originally had some other dedication.

Initially, the Church of the Intercession was the cathedral of a small monastery, but with white-stone fortifications, located on the spit of the Klyazma and Nerl. This monastery was mentioned among the patriarchal house monasteries at the end of the 16th century; in the second half of the 17th century, it briefly flourished; in 1764, it was abolished. In 1784, due to the low profitability of the Pokrovskaya Church, the abbot of the Bogolyubov Monastery (to which it was attached) obtained permission to dismantle the church for building material to erect a monastery bell tower, but a lack of funds prevented the work from beginning. In 1803, an onion-shaped dome with an iron covering was erected on the old stone dome, which largely determines the appearance of the church to this day.

The Pokrovskaya Church was unknown even to professional historians and archaeologists until the 1850s. In particular, it was not included in the album of old Russian churches compiled in 1834 by order of Emperor Nicholas I for the architect Konstantin Thon, who was supposed to develop the foundations of the Russian-Byzantine style on the basis of the selected drawings and present an album of projects of model churches. Even at the end of the 19th century, guidebooks to Vladimir devoted only a few lines to the church on the Nerl. Scientific study of the Pokrovskaya Church began in 1858, when it was inspected by the diocesan architect Nikolai Artleben. In the 1850s, a gate bell tower was built next to the church (it was finally demolished in the 1970s), and in 1884, a warm church of the Three Saints. The Pokrovskaya Church came into full-fledged historical and art history circulation only at the beginning of the 20th century, after it was measured and studied by Igor Grabar.

In 1919, the Pokrovskaya Church was accepted under the protection of the Vladimir Provincial Collegium for Museum Affairs. In 1923, the church was closed. Subsequently, it became part of the Vladimir-Suzdal Museum-Reserve. In the 1970s, after most of the old monastery buildings were cleared, the church became an object of mass tourism.

In the 20th century, the Pokrovskaya Church was restored many times. The most extensive works were carried out in 1954–1955 (at that time, under the supervision of Nikolai Voronin, evidence of the existence of galleries was discovered) and in the late 1980s, when the convex roof from the early 19th century was removed and the pedestal above the drum was restored.

In 1992, the church was inscribed on the UNESCO World Heritage List as part of the White Monuments of Vladimir and Suzdal. Bogolyubovsky Meadow, where the church is located, is now a specially protected natural area and a historical and landscape complex of regional significance. In 1993, the temple was returned to believers.

== Gallery ==
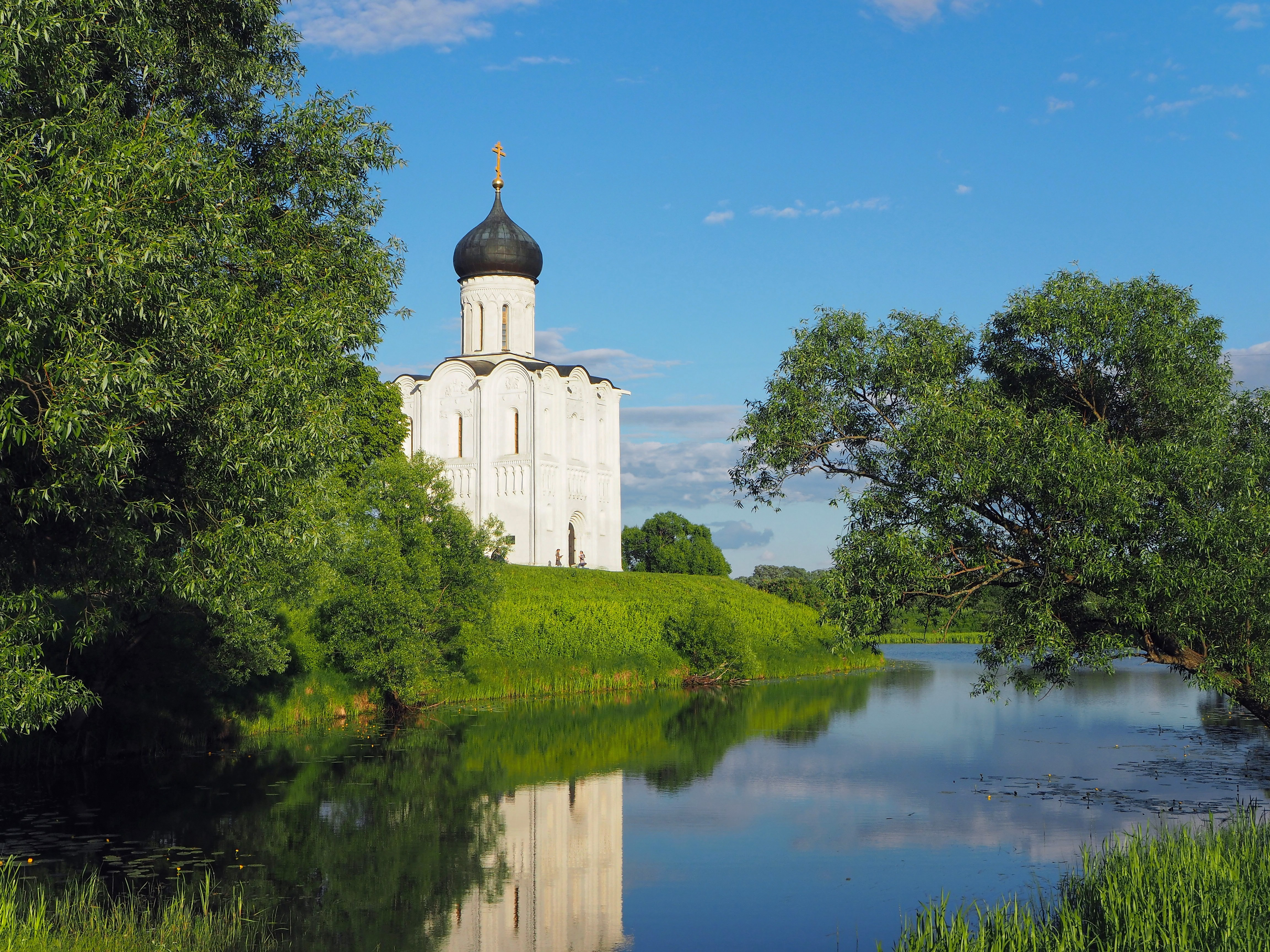
The church, in the foreground: a small lake near the Nerl River

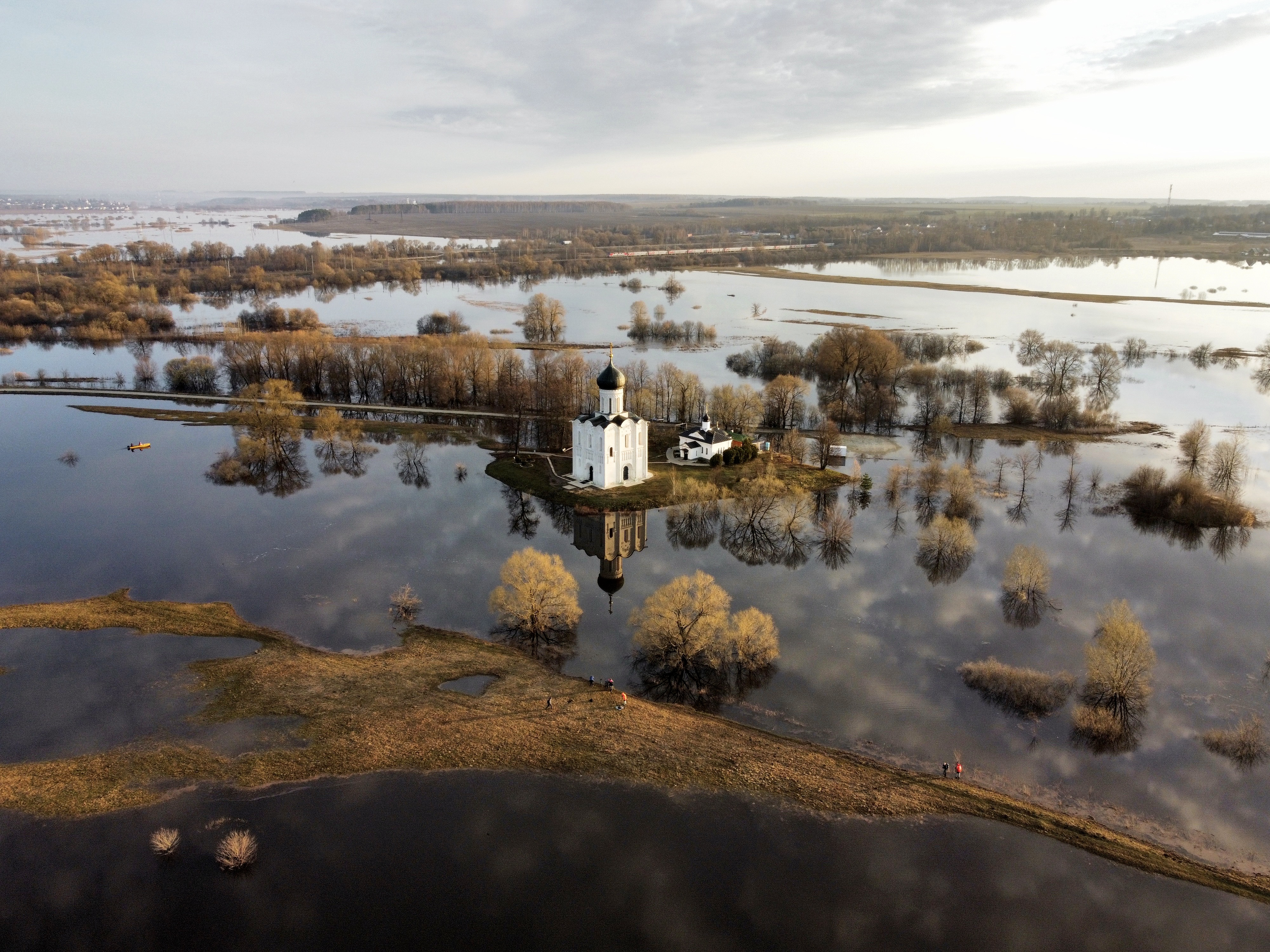
View of the church in 2023, during a flood

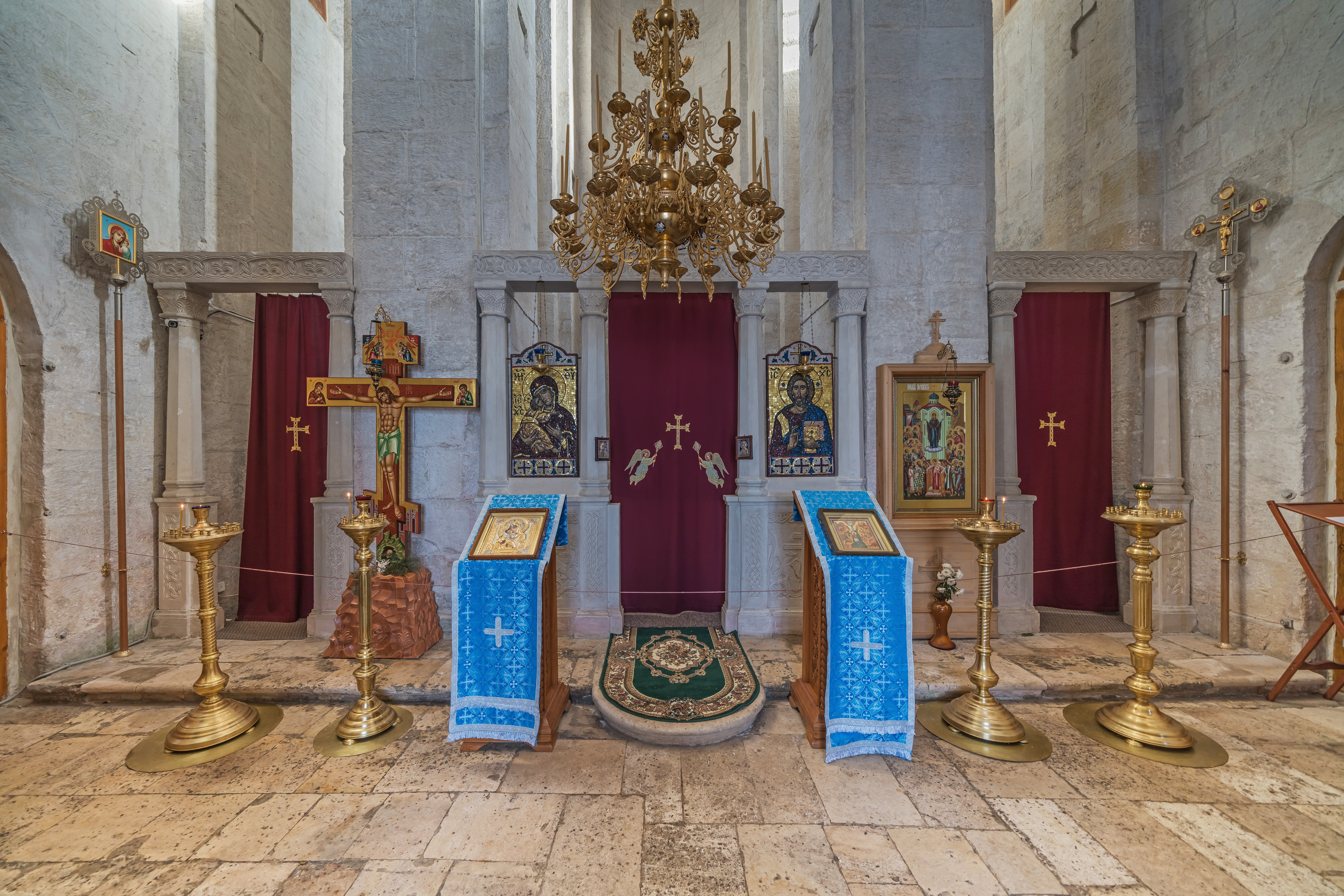
Interior

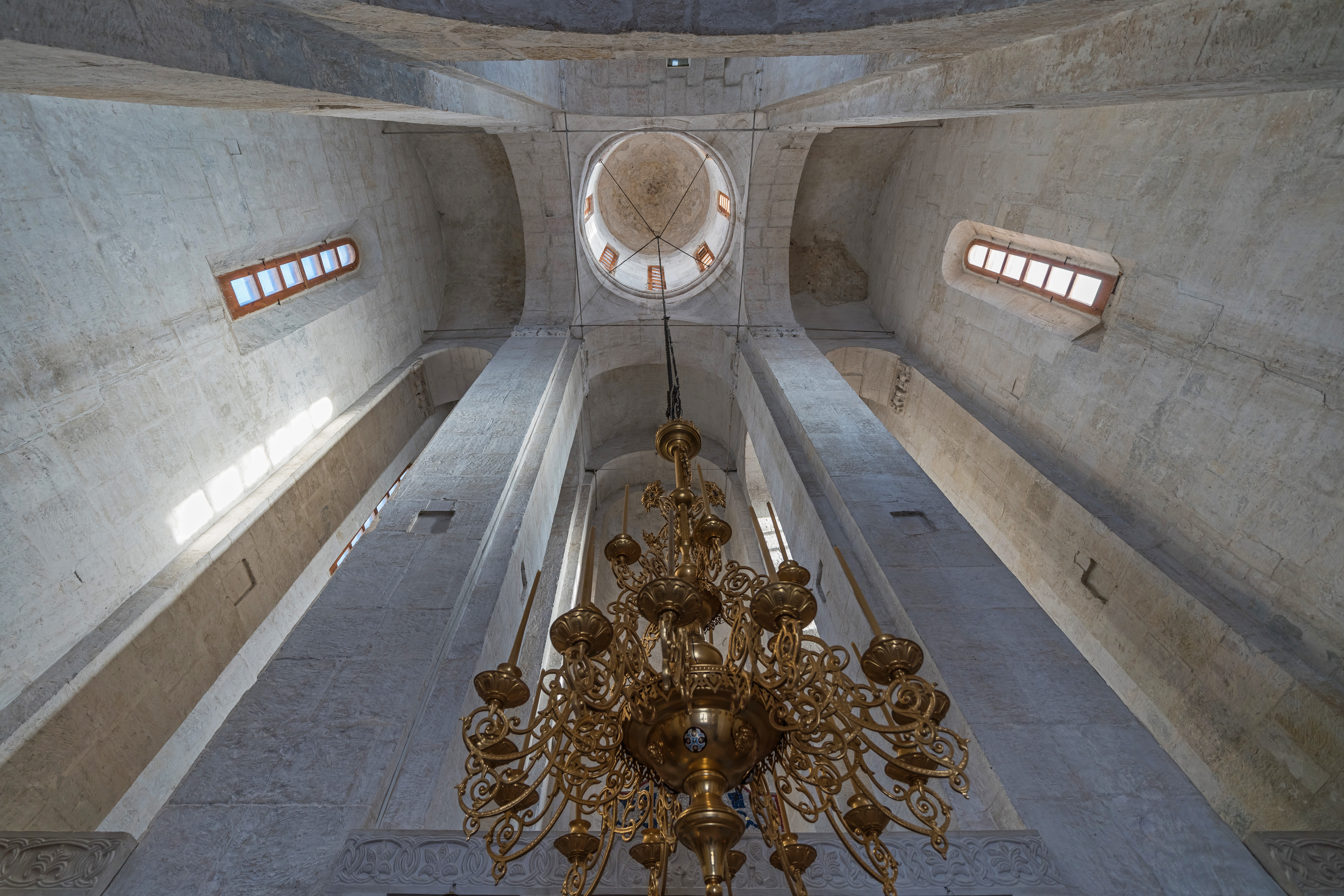
Church vault

== Bibliography ==
- Martin, Janet (2007). Medieval Russia: 980–1584 (2nd ed.). Cambridge: Cambridge University Press. ISBN 978-0-511-36800-4.
- Rappoport, Pavel A. (1993). Древнерусская архитектура. Saint Petersburg: Стройиздат.
- Shvidkovsky, Dmitry (1 January 2007). Russian Architecture and the West. Yale University Press. ISBN 978-0-300-10912-2.
