= Cathedral of Saint Demetrius =

Cathedral in the ancient Russian city of Vladimir

Coordinates: 56°07′45″N 40°24′39″E

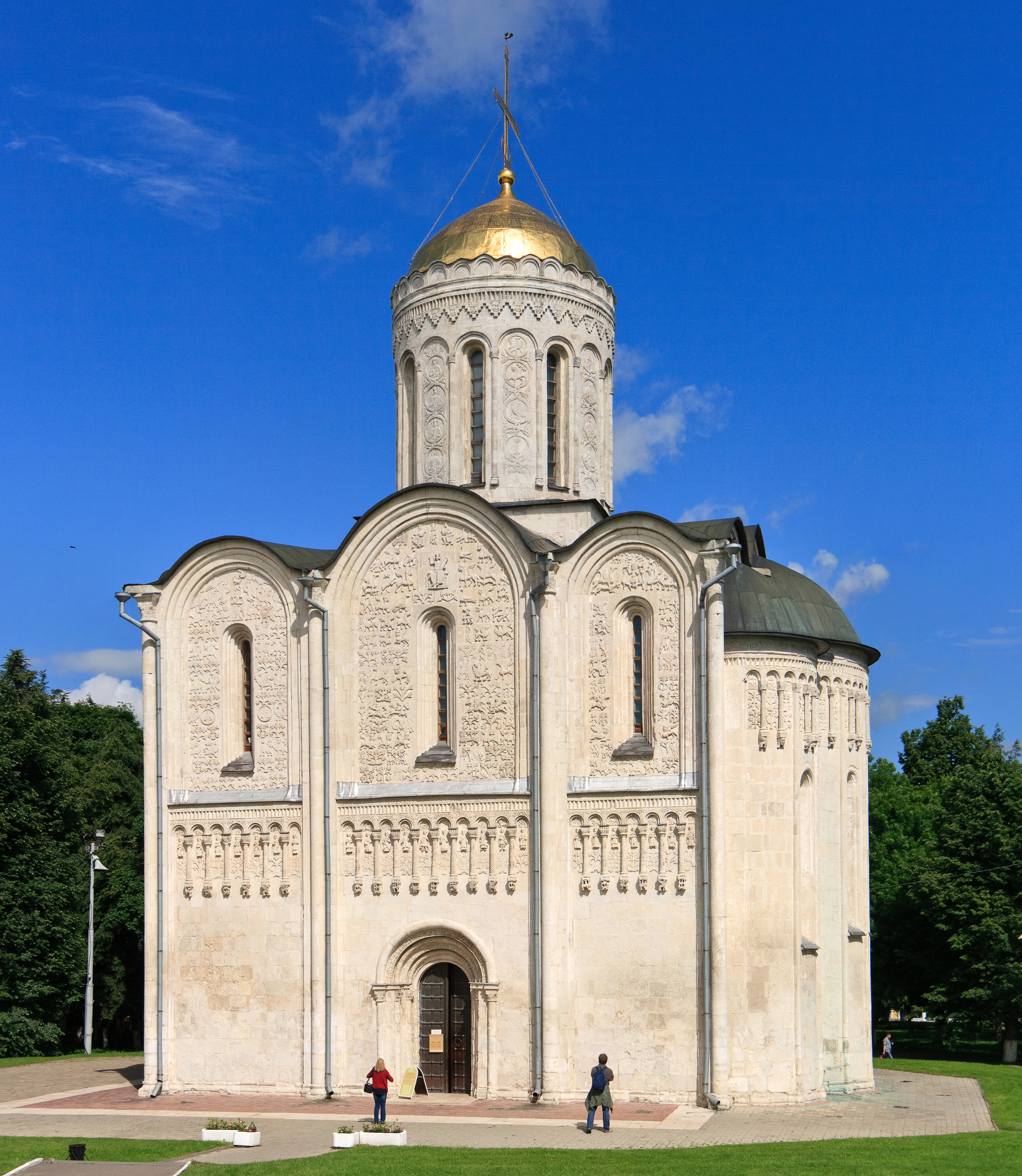
Cathedral of Saint Demetrius

The Cathedral of Saint Demetrius (Russian Дмитриевский собор) is a cathedral in the ancient Russian city of Vladimir. It was finished in 1197 during the reign of the Grand Prince Vsevolod the Big Nest of Vladimir-Suzdal to the honour of Saint Demetrius of Thessaloniki. Being an important component of the White Monuments of Vladimir and Suzdal, the cathedral is listed as a UNESCO World Heritage Site. Currently, the cathedral is a part of the Vladimir-Suzdal open-air museum.

== History ==
The Cathedral of St. Dmitrii in Vladimir, Russia was built by Vsevolod III in 1193-7. It was one of several large churches he had built which also include the much larger Cathedral of Dormition, 1158–60, also in Vladimir, Russia. The cathedral was dedicated to St. Dmitrii of Salonika (St. Demetrios of Thesseloinka in Greek). The Cathedral of St. Dmitrii was originally connected directly with Vsevolod’s palace and was for his personal use. The palace no longer exists and the church has been renovated many times since it was first built but it has kept is predominant features and iconographic program. The most extensive renovation was in 1832 when the some attached structures which used to connect it to the palace were removed. At that time, some of the exterior blocks were moved and some replaced with newly carved blocks. It was included on the UNESCO World Heritage List in 1992.

== Exterior ==
The cathedral is masonry and made from local white limestone blocks. It is cubic in form similar to many earlier churches in Bogolyubovo especially the Church of the Intercession on the Nerl (1165). It has four columns on the interior which supports drum and cupola. The exterior walls are separated into three bays each with the one in the middle larger than the others. Each bay contains a zakomara at the top. They are also separated at mid-level by a horizontal arcade frieze. One side of the cathedral contains an apse which is also separated into three parts. The windows and doors are deeply recessed with extensive carved ornamentation.

== Carvings ==
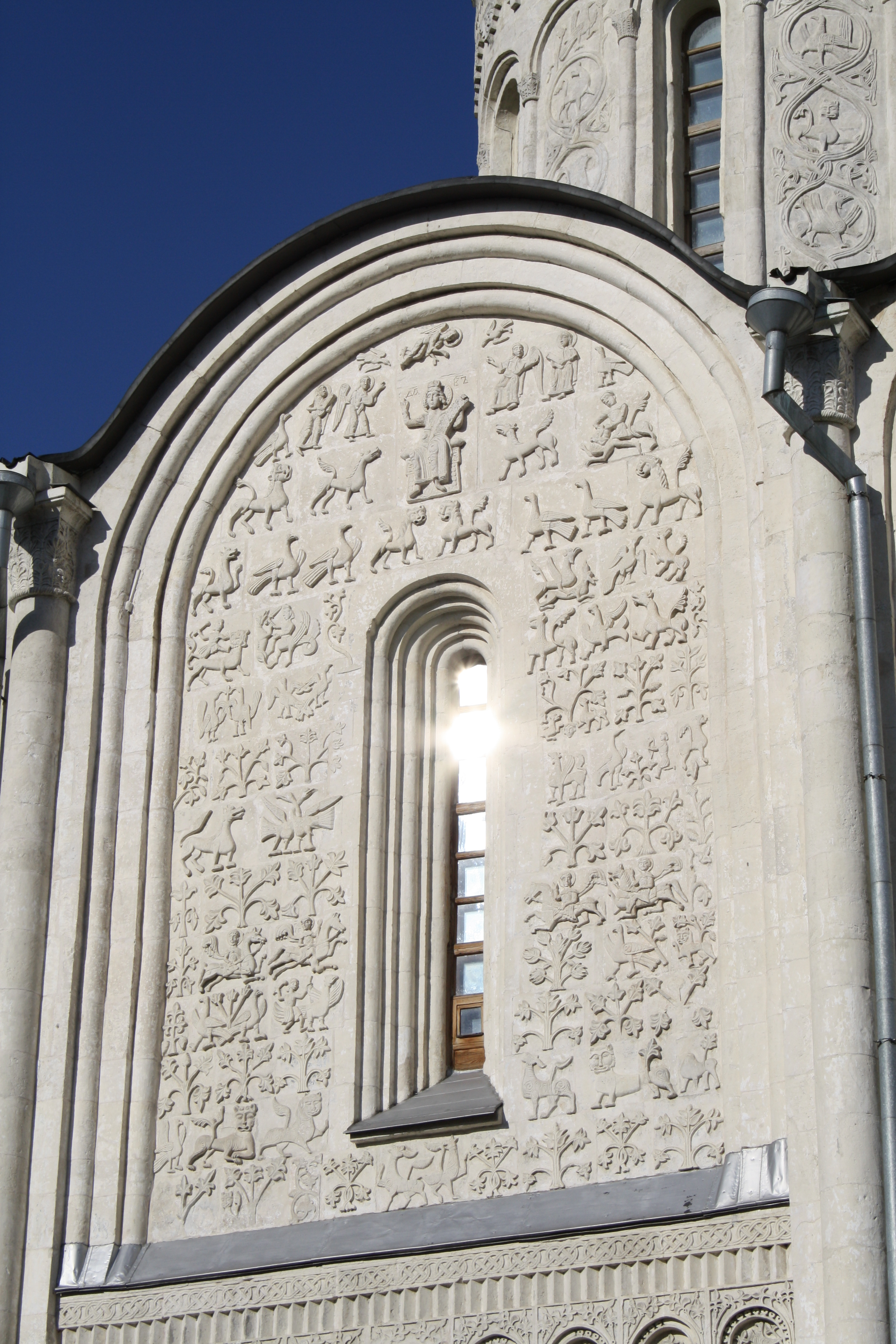
King David surrounded by angels and chimeras.

The most striking feature of the cathedral are the extensive shallow relief carvings which cover the upper half of the exterior walls above the arcade frieze and the drum below the cupola. The source of the artisans and provenance for these carvings seems to be an amalgam of many influences. The most likely are earlier Bogoluiubovo churches, Balkan churches and Armenian churches. Vladimir, at end of the 12th century, was a cosmopolitan and artistic center. Architects and artisans from both the east and west who resided there were used in the construction of the church. In addition, Vsevolod’s mother was a Byzantine princess and Vsevolod lived in Constantinople for several years during his childhood. Another source of inspiration may also have been portable carvings such as Byzantine ivories.

The carvings consist of animals and plants as well as figures in rows and scenes in the zakomary. Some carvings are also ornamental patterns. The patterns, plants and animals (both real and imaginary) might be based pagan beliefs and traditions, traditional Russia folklore or Christian theological themes. These types of carvings make of the majority of the decoration on the cathedral. In each zakomara, there is a figural scene. The most prominent, on the west façade in the central bay, is a scene featuring King David surrounded by angels and chimeras. King David is also featured on the south façade central bay surrounded by warrior saints. Other prominent figures, in addition to Christ and Mary, include Solomon, Alexander the Great, Hercules, warrior saints and churchmen. The final piece of this theme being the zakomara of the north façade left showing the donor, Vsevolod with his sons. In a time when power and territory were taken and held by military might, the building of churches and palaces which support the prince’s authority are important. This cathedral, not unlike the Cathedral of Dormition by its size and grandeur, by its iconographic program reinforces the prince’s authority by linking it to ancient kings and philosophers, biblical figures and military leaders.

== Interior ==
While a few carvings are still intact inside the cathedral, the most important original feature of the interior are a few frescoes above and around the west entrance that have survived since the late 12th century. The quality of the work varies. The best work in the faces of saints and angels in the Last Judgement scene are likely the work of Byzantine masters with their Russian pupils completing less important parts such as drapery and background. The lines and shading of the better parts is comparable to the best work in Greece and Byzantium. The icon of the Virgin of Vladimir was also known to be in the nearby Cathedral of Dormition at the time the frescoes were painted so was likely a source of inspiration and training.

== Resources ==
- Brumfield, W. (1993). A history of Russian architecture. Cambridge; New York, NY, USA: Cambridge University Press.
- Brumfield, W. (1997). Landmarks of Russian architecture : A photographic survey (Documenting the image; v. 5). Australia: Gordon and Breach.
- Hamilton, George Heard. The art and architecture of Russia. Penguin Books, 1983.
- Hare, Richard. The art and artists of Russia. New York Graphic Society, 1966.
- Kornilovich, K. (1967). Arts of Russia : From the origins to the end of the 16th century. Cleveland: World Pub
