= Laryovo =

Laryovo (Russian: Ларёво) is the name of two rural localities in Russia:

- Laryovo, Moscow, a village in Sosenskoye Settlement of the federal city of Moscow
- Laryovo, Moscow Oblast, a village in Fedoskinskoye Rural Settlement of Mytishchinsky District in Moscow Oblast; 56°6′N 37°31′E
