= Serebryanka (Moscow Oblast) =

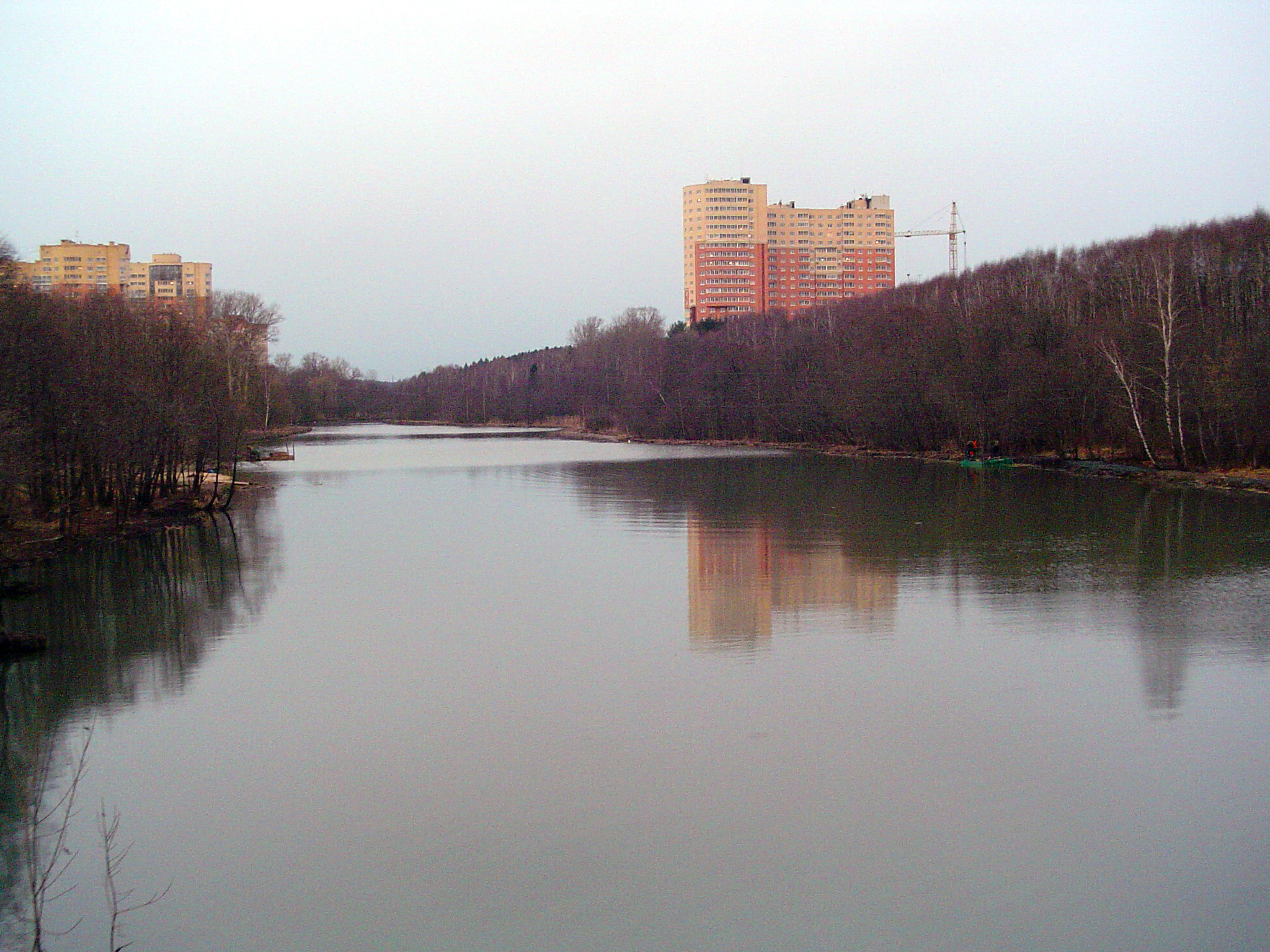
- The Serebryanka in Pushkino

Location
- Country: Pushkinsky District, Moscow Oblast, Russia

Physical characteristics
- Mouth: Ucha
  - coordinates: 55°59′27″N 37°51′28″E
- Length: 13 km (8.1 mi)

Basin features
- Progression: Ucha→ Klyazma→ Oka→ Volga→ Caspian Sea

The Serebryanka (Russian: Серебрянка) is a river in Moscow Oblast, Russia, a tributary of the Ucha. It flows through Pushkinsky District. The river starts in the village of Stepankovo and ends in Pushkino city, where it is confined by a levee near its mouth. There is a boat station on the river that holds rowing competitions. The total length of the river is 13 km.

The Serebryanka is fed mainly by snow. It freezes in mid-November and thaws in mid-April.
