= Lukh (river) =

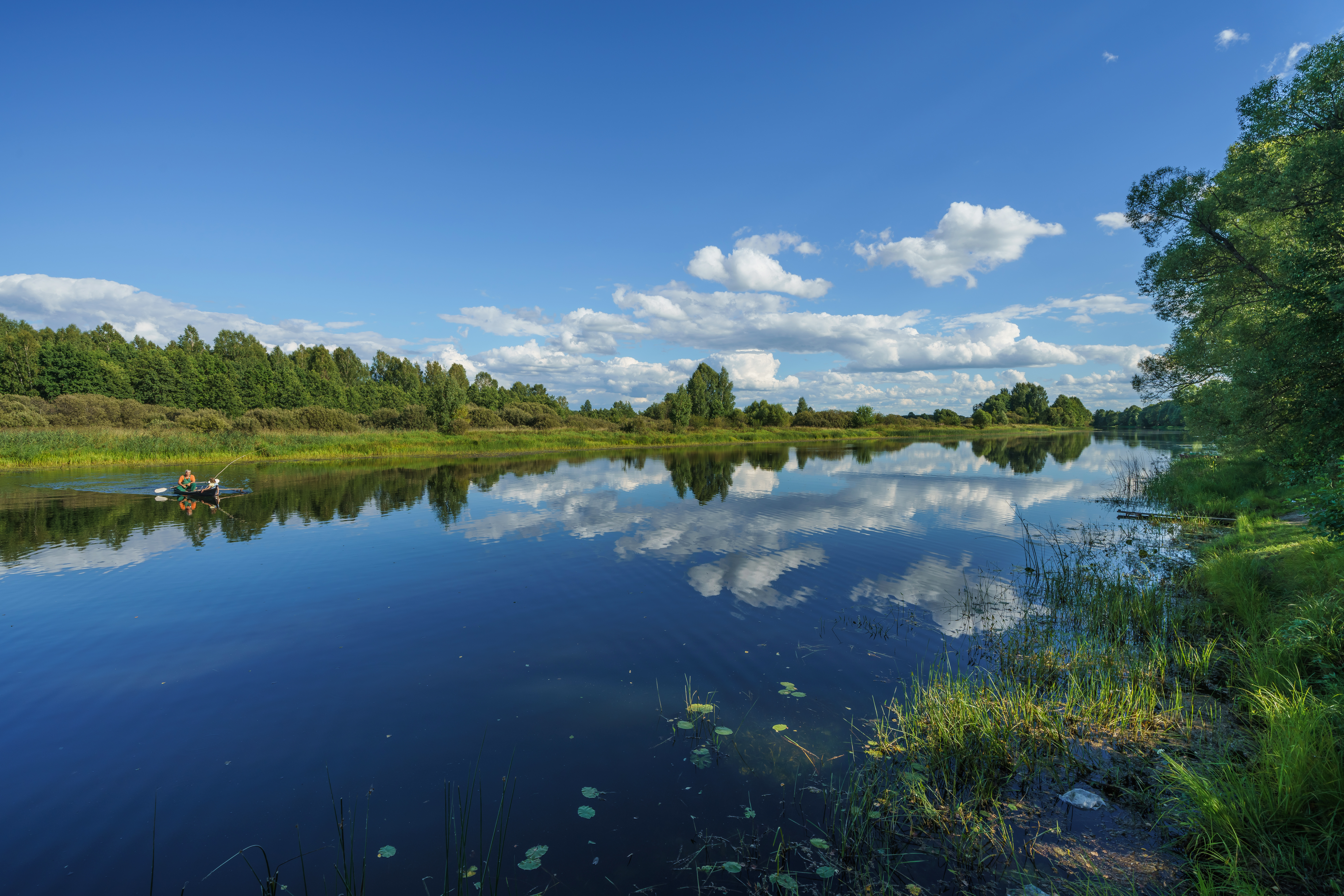
- Lukh at Khudynskoye
- Native name: Лух (Russian)

Location
- Country: Russia

Physical characteristics
- Mouth: Klyazma
  - coordinates: 56.2277°N 42.4042°E
- Length: 240 km (150 mi)
- Basin size: 4,450 km^{2} (1,720 sq mi)

Basin features
- Progression: Klyazma→ Oka→ Volga→ Caspian Sea

The Lukh (Russian: Лух) is a river in Ivanovo, Nizhny Novgorod and Vladimir Oblasts in Russia, a left tributary of the Klyazma (Volga's basin). The length of the river is 240 km. The area of its drainage basin is 4,450 km^{2}. The Lukh freezes up in late November and breaks up in April.

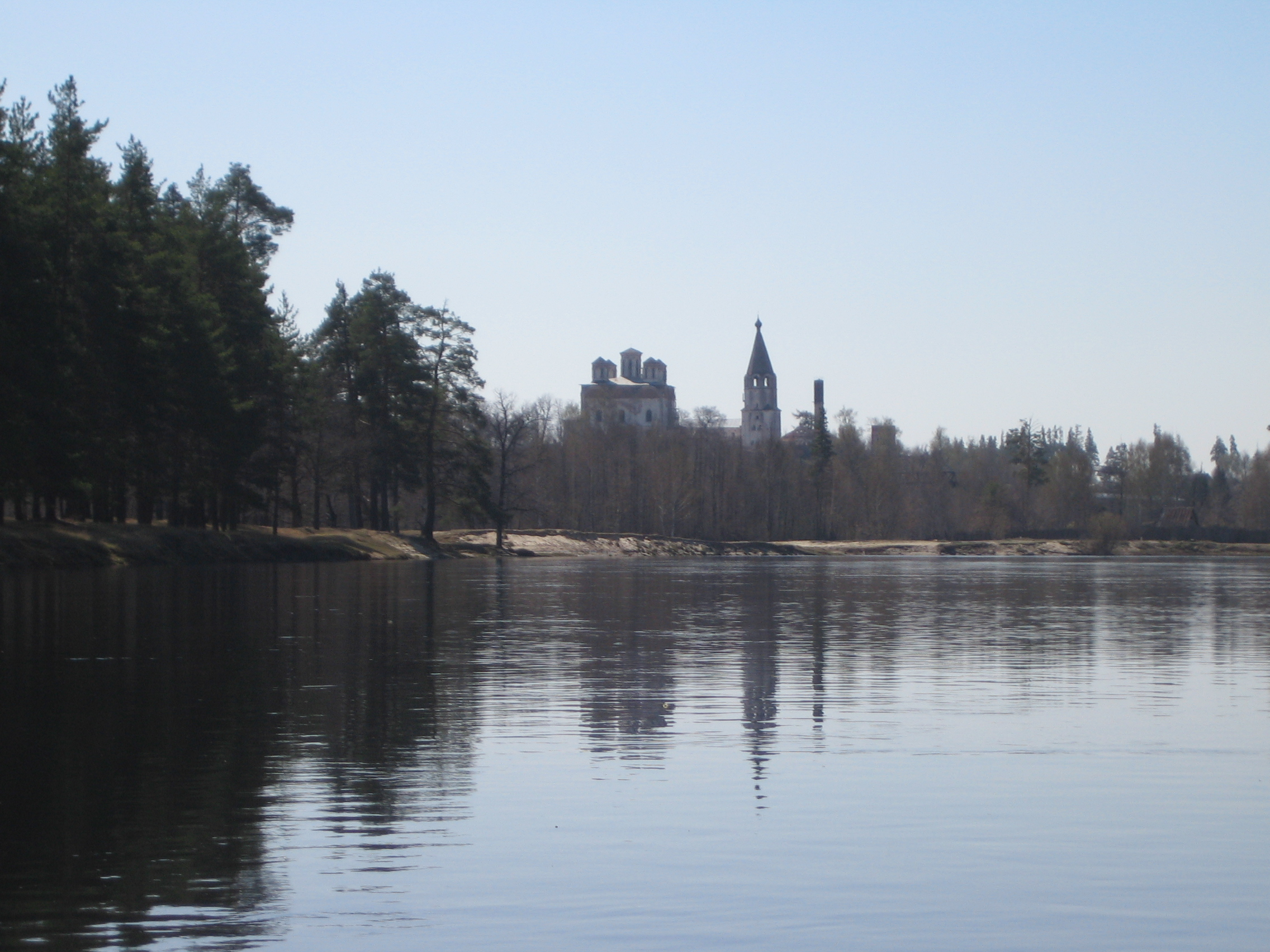
An abandoned monastery in Frolishi, a view from Lukh River

The main tributaries are the Pechuga, Dobritsa, Landekh, Sezukh.
