= Yeltsy =

Village in Russia

Yeltsy Ельцы
- Village
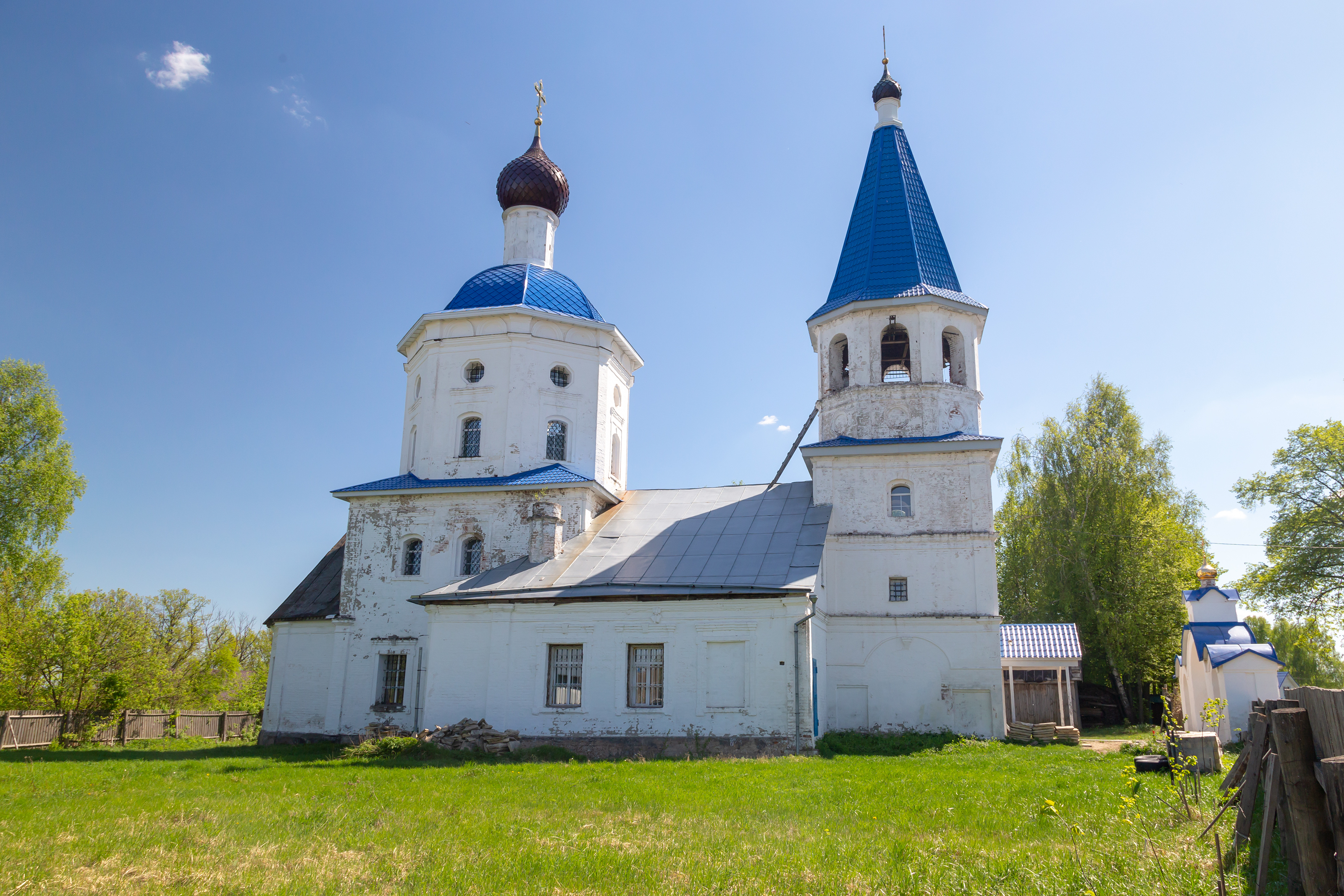
- Yeltsy in 2018

- Location within Vladimir Oblast Location within Russia
- Coordinates: 56°10′N 38°46′E
- Country: Russia
- Region: Vladimir Oblast
- District: Kirzhachsky District
- Time zone: UTC+3:00

Yeltsy (Russian: Ельцы) is a rural locality (a village) in Gorkinskoye Rural Settlement, Kirzhachsky District, Vladimir Oblast, Russia. The population was 589 as of 2010. There are 14 streets.

== Geography ==
Yeltsy is located 10 km northwest of Kirzhach (the district's administrative centre) by road. Naumovo is the nearest rural locality.
