= Ucha (river) =

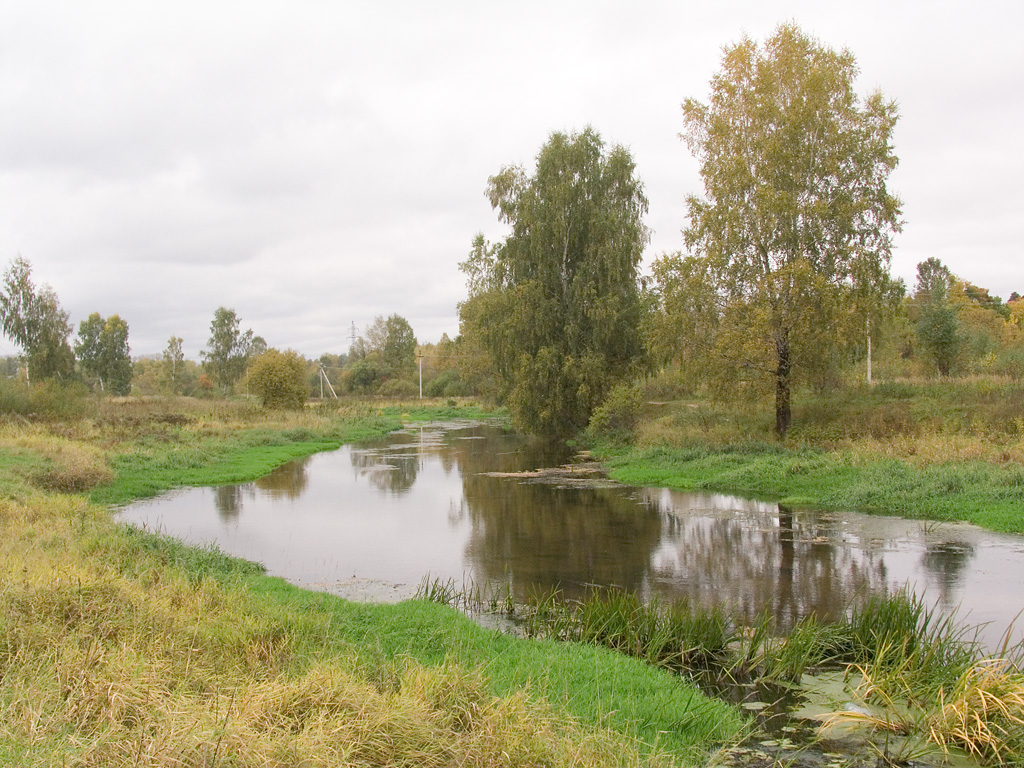
- Ucha at the town of Pushkino
- Native name: Уча (Russian)

Location
- Country: Russia

Physical characteristics
- Mouth: Klyazma
  - coordinates: 55.9392°N 37.9527°E
- Length: 42 km (26 mi)
- Basin size: 605 km^{2} (234 sq mi)

Basin features
- Progression: Klyazma→ Oka→ Volga→ Caspian Sea

The Ucha (Russian: Уча́) is a river in Moscow Oblast, Russia. It is a left tributary of the Klyazma. The construction of the Moscow Canal has separated the upper course of the Ucha from its lower course.

The Ucha is 42 km in length, with a drainage basin of 605 km². It flows through the towns of Pushkino and Ivanteyevka, and flows into the Klyazma at the town of Shchyolkovo.

Tributaries: Serebryanka, Akulovka, Samoryadovka, Razderikha.
