= Sudogda (river) =

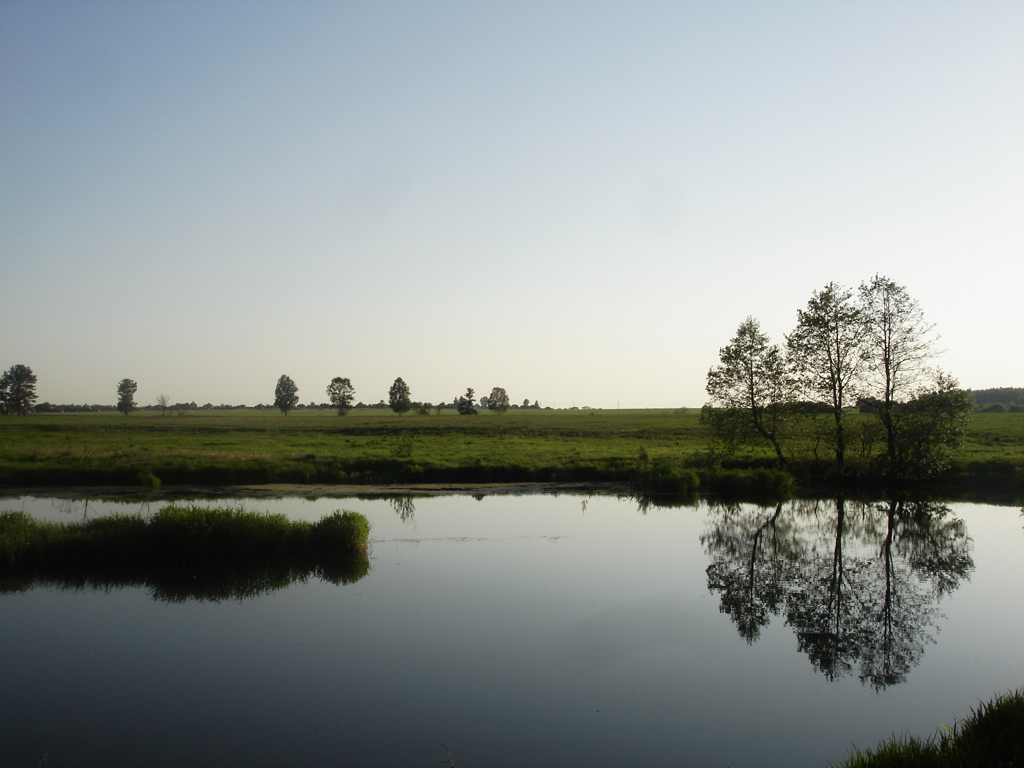
- Sudogda near the village Berezhki
- Native name: Судогда (Russian)

Location
- Country: Russia

Physical characteristics
- Mouth: Klyazma
  - coordinates: 56.1451°N 40.8206°E
- Length: 116 km (72 mi)
- Basin size: 1,900 km^{2} (730 sq mi)

Basin features
- Progression: Klyazma→ Oka→ Volga→ Caspian Sea

The Sudogda (Russian: Судогда) is a river in the Vladimir Oblast of Russia, a right tributary of the Klyazma.

The Sudogda arises near the village Lazarevka in the south of the oblast and empties into the Klyazma near the village of Spas-Kupalische. It is 116 kilometres (72 mi) long, and has a drainage basin of 1,900 square kilometres (730 sq mi). It has an average slope of 0.342 m/km; half of the fall occurs in the first 20 kilometers. The river is wooded; the shore consists largely of meadows and swamps, particularly upstream. The general direction of flow is north.

On the river are the towns of Sudogda and Muromtsevo as well as a number of villages, and formerly several small hydropower plants.
