= Nerekhta (inhabited locality) =

Nerekhta (Russian: Нерехта) is the name of several inhabited localities in Russia.

Urban localities

- Nerekhta, Kostroma Oblast, a town in Kostroma Oblast; 57°27′N 40°35′E

Rural localities

- Nerekhta, Vladimir Oblast, a settlement in Kovrovsky District of Vladimir Oblast
