= Laryovo, Moscow Oblast =

Laryovo Ларёво
- Village
- Interactive map of Laryovo
- Location of Laryovo Laryovo (Moscow Oblast)
- Coordinates: 56°06′N 37°31′E
- Country: Russia
- Federal subject: Moscow Oblast
- Administrative district: Mytishchinsky District
- Rural settlementSelsoviet: Fedoskinskoye Rural Settlement

Population
  - Estimate (2010): 64 )

Municipal status
  - Municipal district: Mytishchinsky Municipal District
  - Rural settlement: Fedoskinskoye Rural Settlement
- Time zone: UTC+3 (MSK)
- Postal code: 141052
- Dialing code: +7 495
- OKTMO ID: 46746000256

Laryovo (Russian: Ларёво) is a rural locality (a village) in Mytishchinsky District of Moscow Oblast, Russia, located on the banks of the Samoryadovka River.

== Transportation ==
A104 (Moscow–Dmitrov–Dubna) road connects Laryovo with Moscow and various places in Moscow Oblast. There is bus service. Katuar railway station in Nekrasovsky is the closest to Laryovo, where suburban commuter trains, operated by the Central Suburban Passenger Company, can be taken to Moscow.
