= Naumovo =

Naumovo Наумово
- Village
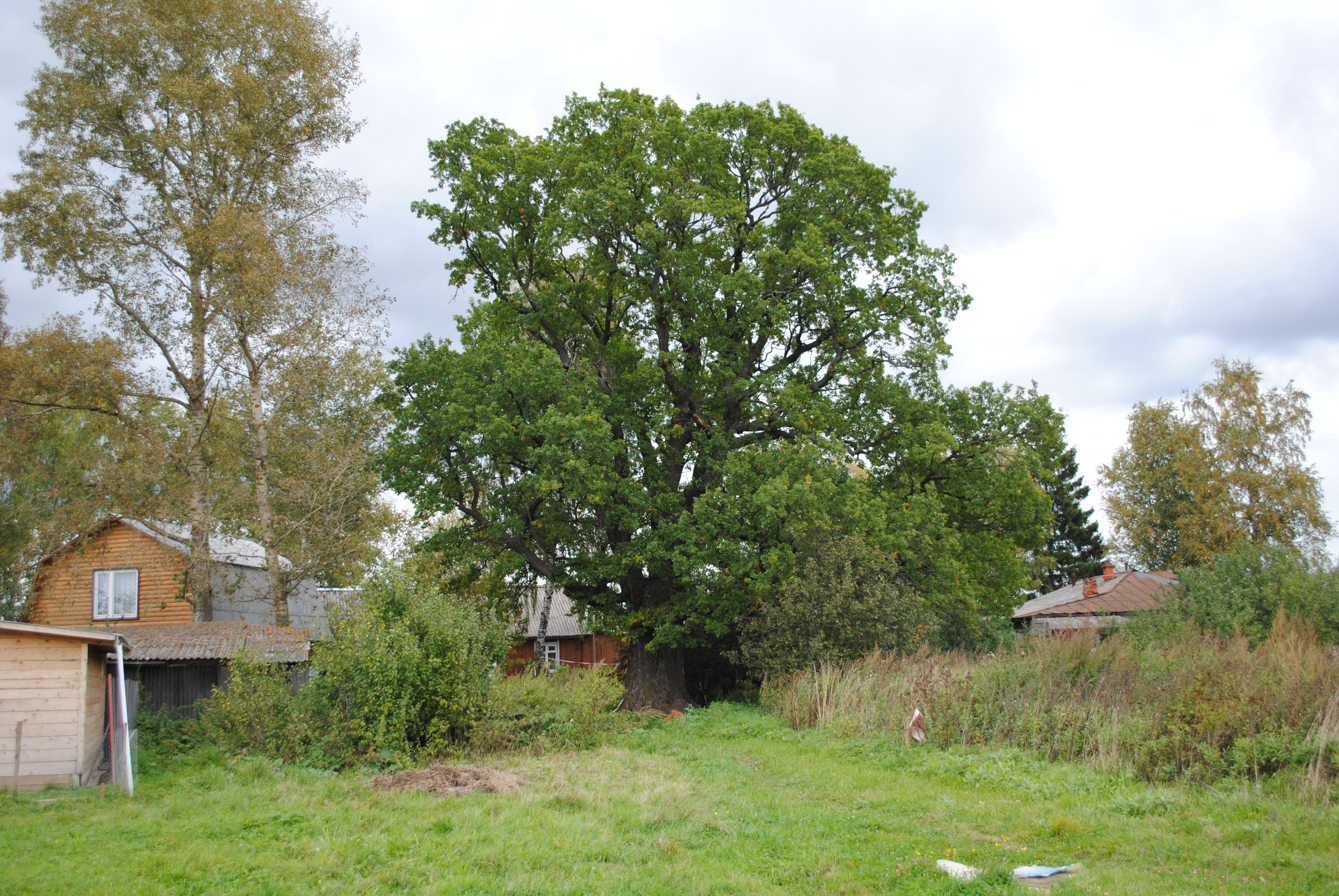
- Naumovo

- Location within Vladimir Oblast Location within Russia
- Coordinates: 56°24′N 38°40′E
- Country: Russia
- Region: Vladimir Oblast
- District: Alexandrovsky District
- Time zone: UTC+3:00

Naumovo (Russian: Наумово) is a rural locality (a village) in Slednevskoye Rural Settlement, Alexandrovsky District, Vladimir Oblast, Russia. The population was 95 as of 2010. There are five streets.

== Geography ==
Naumovo is located 6 km west of Alexandrov (the district's administrative centre) by road. Alexandrov is the nearest rural locality.
