= Kideksha =

Village in Vladimir Oblast, Russia

Coordinates: 56°25′27″N 40°31′19″E

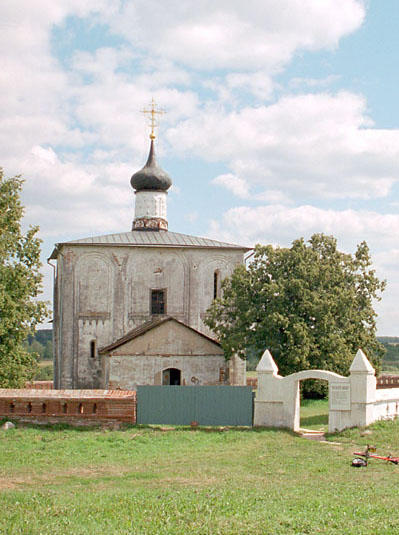
The Church of Boris and Gleb in Kideksha

Kideksha (Russian: Кидекша) is a village (selo) in Seletskoye Rural Settlement, Suzdalsky District of Vladimir Oblast, Russia, located at the confluence of the Kamenka and Nerl Rivers, 4 kilometers (2.5 mi) east of Suzdal. The name derives from a substrate Finno-Ugric language (compare keaδkē (stone) and śäčä (flood), hence "stony river"; the Russian "Kamenka" has a similar meaning).

The settlement was founded before the Church of Boris and Gleb was built in 1152 by Yuri Dolgoruky.

Kideksha used to be a town, but, after having been destroyed during the Mongol invasion of Rus, it degraded to a small village.

Kideksha is a part of the Golden Ring of Russia and, since 1992, is one of Russia's World Heritage Sites (see White Monuments of Vladimir and Suzdal).
