= Nerekhta, Vladimir Oblast =

Nerekhta Нерехта
- Settlement
- Location within Vladimir Oblast Location within Russia
- Coordinates: 56°12′N 41°19′E
- Country: Russia
- Region: Vladimir Oblast
- District: Kovrovsky District
- Time zone: UTC+3:00

Nerekhta (Russian: Нерехта) is a rural locality (a settlement) in Novoselskoye Rural Settlement, Kovrovsky District, Vladimir Oblast, Russia. The population was 444 as of 2010. There are 7 streets.

== Geography ==
Nerekhta is located on the Nerekhta River, 20 km south of Kovrov (the district's administrative centre) by road. Krutovo is the nearest rural locality.
