= Sherna =

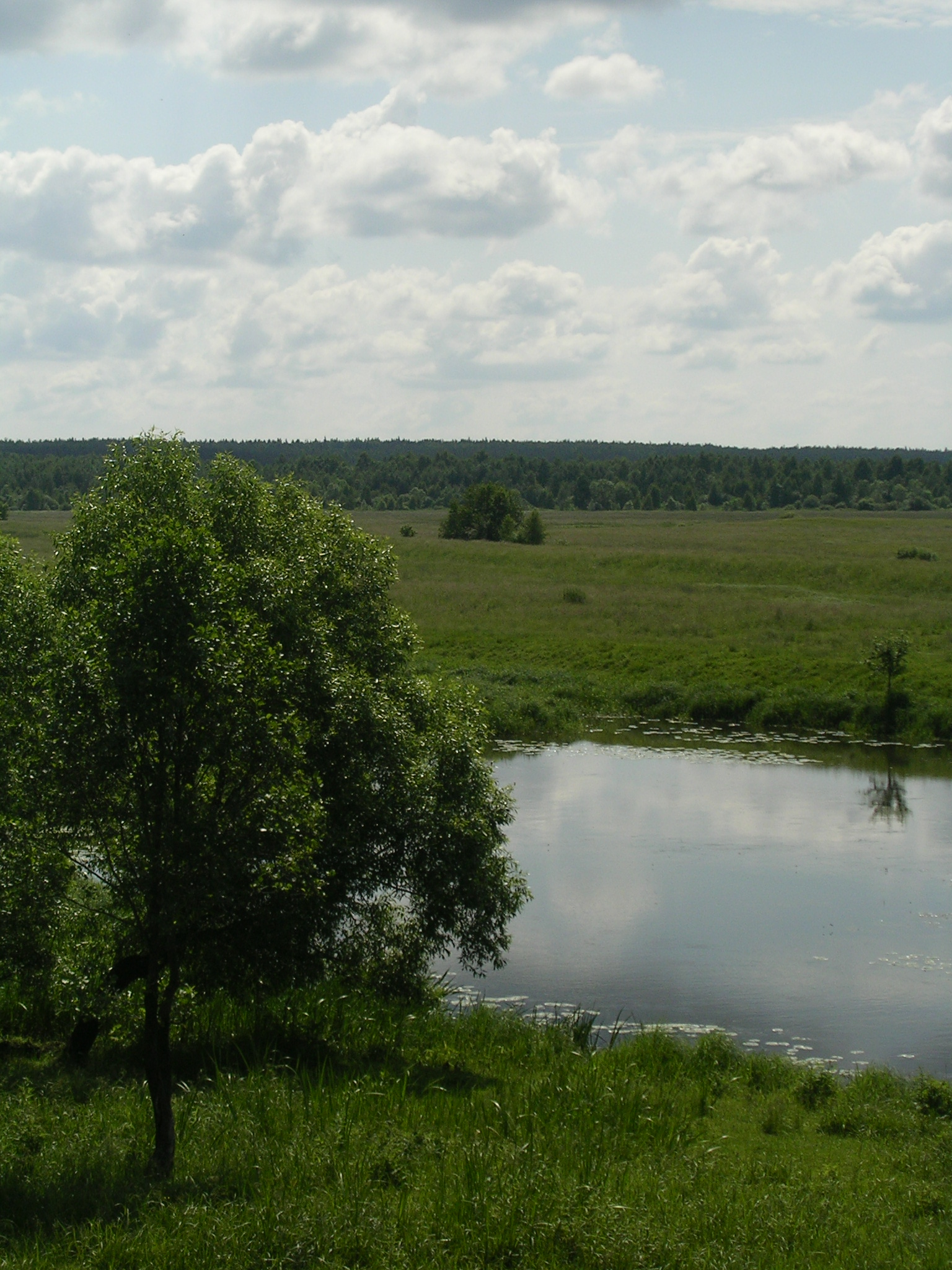
- Sherna at Filippovskoye
- Native name: Шерна (Russian)

Location
- Country: Russia

Physical characteristics
- Mouth: Klyazma
  - coordinates: 55°50′42″N 38°34′27″E
- Length: 89 km (55 mi)
- Basin size: 1,890 km^{2} (730 sq mi)

Basin features
- Progression: Klyazma→ Oka→ Volga→ Caspian Sea

The Sherna (Russian: Ше́рна) is a river in Vladimir and Moscow Oblasts in Russia. It is a left tributary of the Klyazma. It has a length of 89 km, and a drainage basin of 1890 km². The river is formed by the confluence of the rivers Seraya and Molokcha near Belkovo in Kirzhachsky District of Vladimir Oblast.
