= Bogolyubovo, Vladimir Oblast =

Bogolyubovo Боголюбово
- Settlement
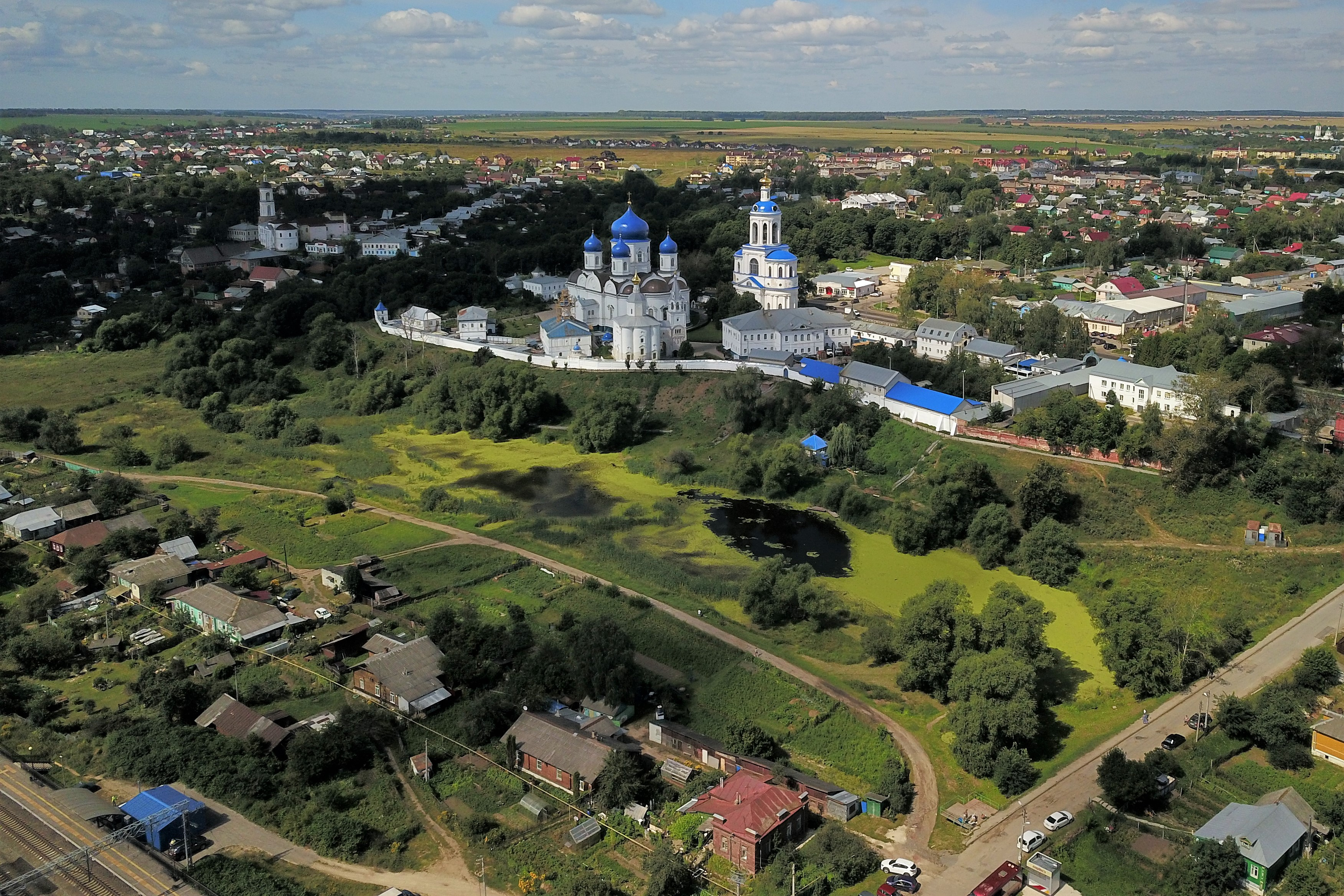
- Aerial view of Bogolyubovo
- Interactive map of Bogolyubovo
- Location of Bogolyubovo Bogolyubovo (Vladimir Oblast)
- Coordinates: 56°11′N 40°32′E
- Country: Russia
- Federal subject: Vladimir Oblast
- Administrative district: Suzdalsky District
- Founded: 1158
- Rural locality status since: 2006
- Elevation: 131 m (430 ft)

Population (2010 Census)
  - Total: 4,494
  - Estimate (2021): 4,729 (+5.2%)
- Time zone: UTC+3 (MSK)
- Postal code: 601270
- Dialing code: +7 4922
- OKTMO ID: 17654403101

Bogolyubovo (Russian: Боголю́бово) is a rural locality (a settlement) in Suzdalsky District of Vladimir Oblast, Russia, located some 10 kilometers (6.2 mi) northeast of Vladimir, the administrative center of the oblast. Population: 4,729 (2021 census); 4,494 (2010 census); 4,218 (2002 census); 4,143 (1989 Soviet census); 3,900 (1969).

== History ==
It was built between 1158 and 1165 by the order of Andrey Bogolyubsky at the mouth of the Nerl River (where it flows into the Klyazma River). Russian Orthodox Christians believe that Bogolyubovo was founded on the spot where Bogolyubsky saw a miraculous vision of the Theotokos, who commanded him to build a church and a monastery on this spot. Subsequently, the Church of the Intercession on the Nerl was built here. The church has been on UNESCO World Heritage List since 1992.

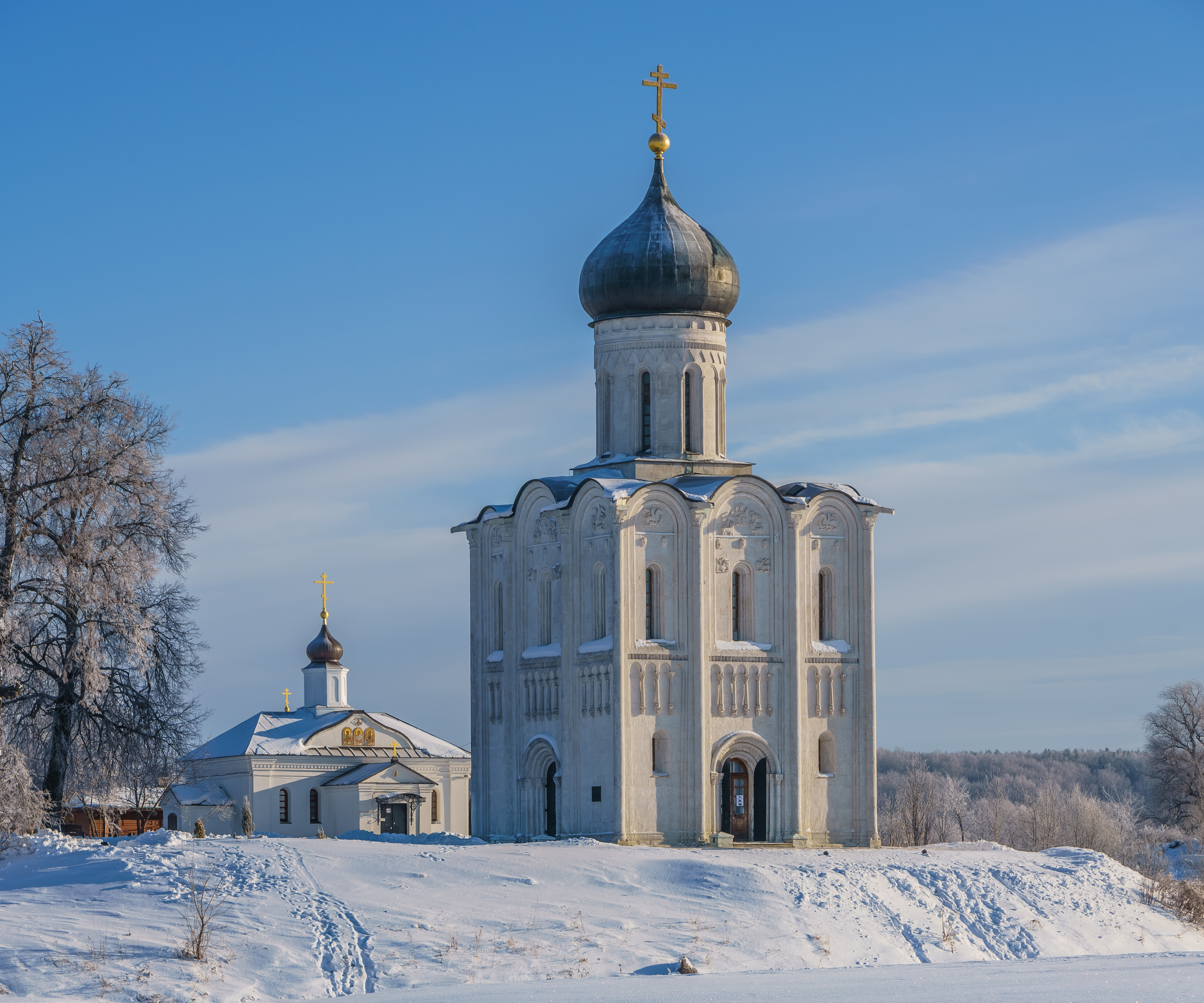
The Church of the Intercession on the Nerl in Bogolyubovo

Bogolyubsky also commissioned the icon of the apparition of the Theotokos. This icon has been known as the Bogolubskaya Icon of the Theotokos.

After Bogolyubsky's death, Bogolyubovo was ravaged and ransacked by Gleb of Ryazan in 1177. In the 1230s, the Mongols destroyed its fortifications.

In 1960–2006, Bogolyubovo had urban-type settlement status.
