= Nerekhta (river) =

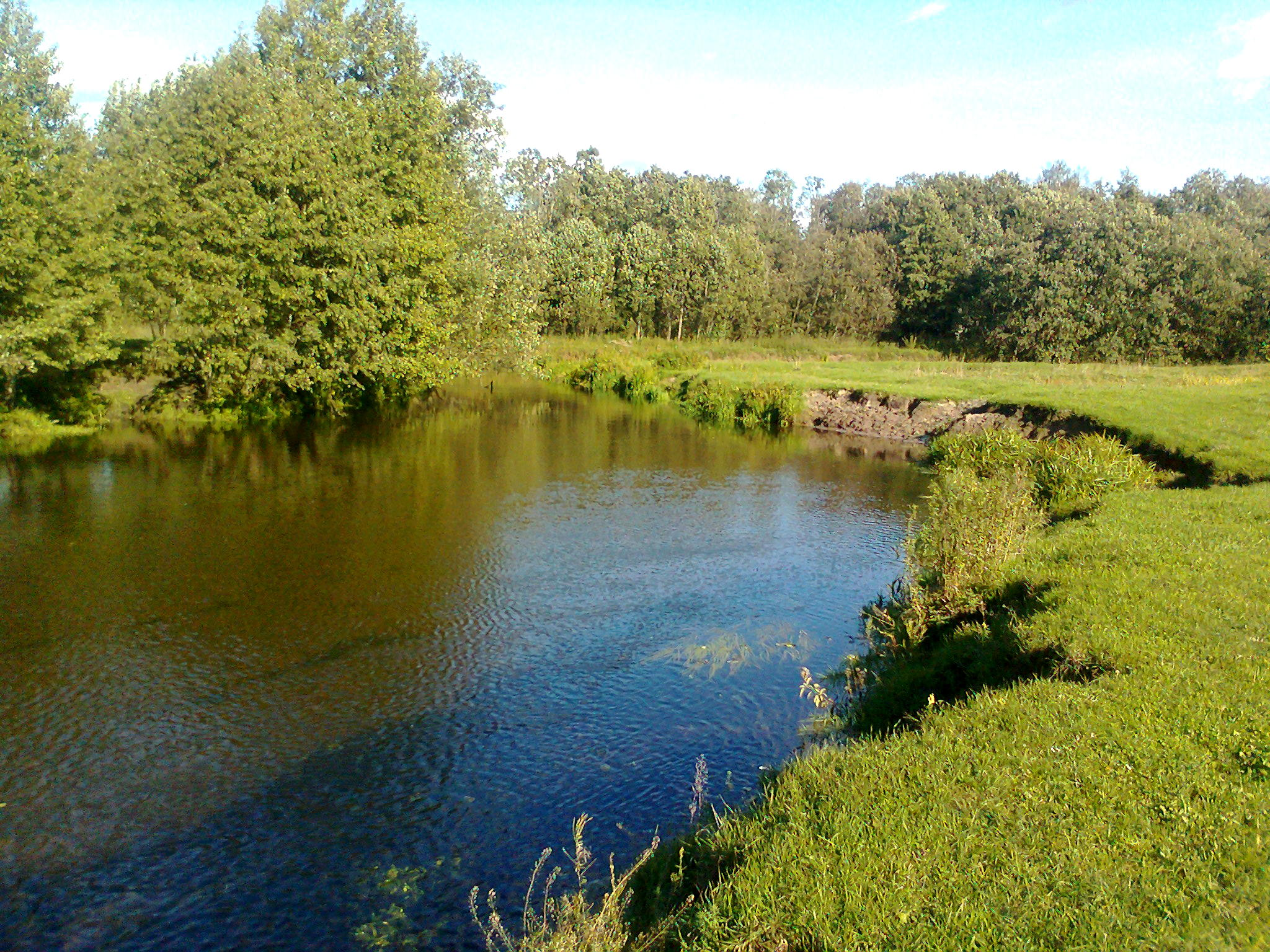
- Native name: Нерехта (Russian)

Location
- Country: Russia

Physical characteristics
- Mouth: Klyazma
  - coordinates: 56.3425°N 41.2525°E
- Length: 49 km (30 mi)
- Basin size: 415 km^{2} (160 sq mi)

Basin features
- Progression: Klyazma→ Oka→ Volga→ Caspian Sea

The Nerekhta (Russian: Нерехта) is a river in Vladimir Oblast in Russia, a right tributary of the Klyazma (Volga's basin). It is 49 kilometres (30 mi) long, and has a drainage basin of 415 square kilometres (160 sq mi). The Nerekhta freezes up in November and breaks up in April.
