= Nerl (Klyazma) =

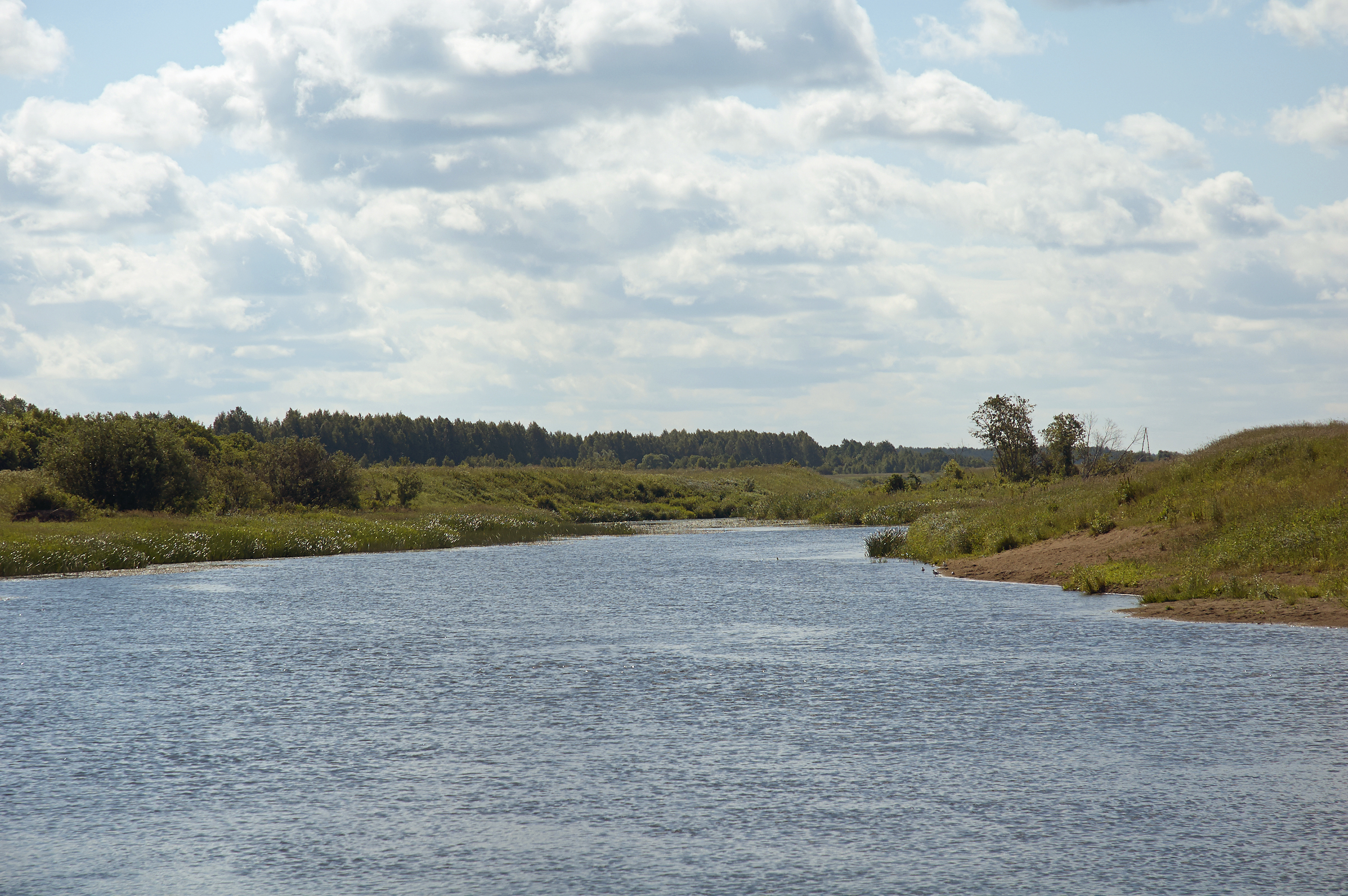
- The Nerl near Kideksha.
- Native name: Нерль (Russian)

Location
- Country: Russia

Physical characteristics
- Mouth: Klyazma
  - coordinates: 56.1912°N 40.5686°E
- Length: 284 km (176 mi)
- Basin size: 6,780 km^{2} (2,620 sq mi)

Basin features
- Progression: Klyazma→ Oka→ Volga→ Caspian Sea

The Nerl (Russian: Нерль) is a river in the Yaroslavl, Ivanovo, and Vladimir Oblasts in Russia, a left tributary of the Klyazma (Volga's basin). The river is 284 kilometres (176 mi) long, and its drainage basin covers 6,780 square kilometres (2,620 mi^{2}). The Nerl River freezes up in November or December and stays under the ice until April. Its main tributary is the Ukhtoma.

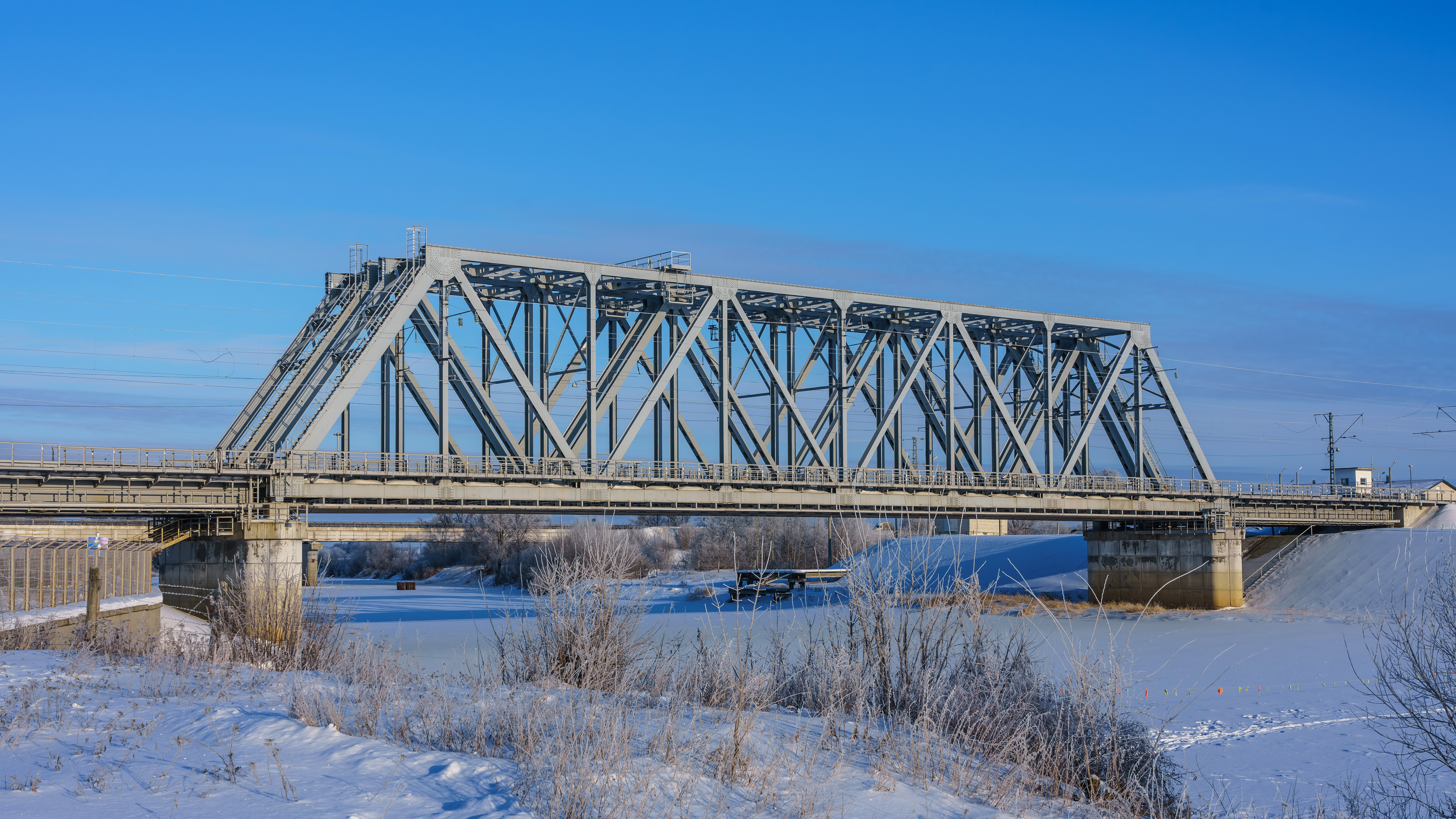
Railway bridge over the Nerl in Bogolyubovo
