= Nekrasovsky, Moscow Oblast =

Nekrasovsky Некрасовский
- Urban-type settlement
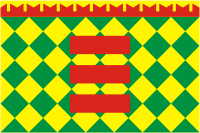
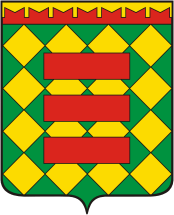
- Flag Coat of arms
- Interactive map of Nekrasovsky
- Location of Nekrasovsky Nekrasovsky (Moscow Oblast)
- Coordinates: 56.0953°N 37.4998°E
- Country: Russia
- Federal subject: Moscow Oblast
- Administrative district: Dmitrovsky District

Population (2010 Census)
  - Total: 10,292
  - Estimate (2025): 11,674 (+13.4%)
- Time zone: UTC+3 (MSK)
- Postal code: 141865
- OKTMO ID: 46608163051

Nekrasovsky (Russian: Некра́совский) is an urban locality (an urban-type settlement) in Dmitrovsky District of Moscow Oblast, Russia. Population: 10,292 (2010 census); 9,693 (2002 census); 7,267 (1989 Soviet census).
