= Klyazma =

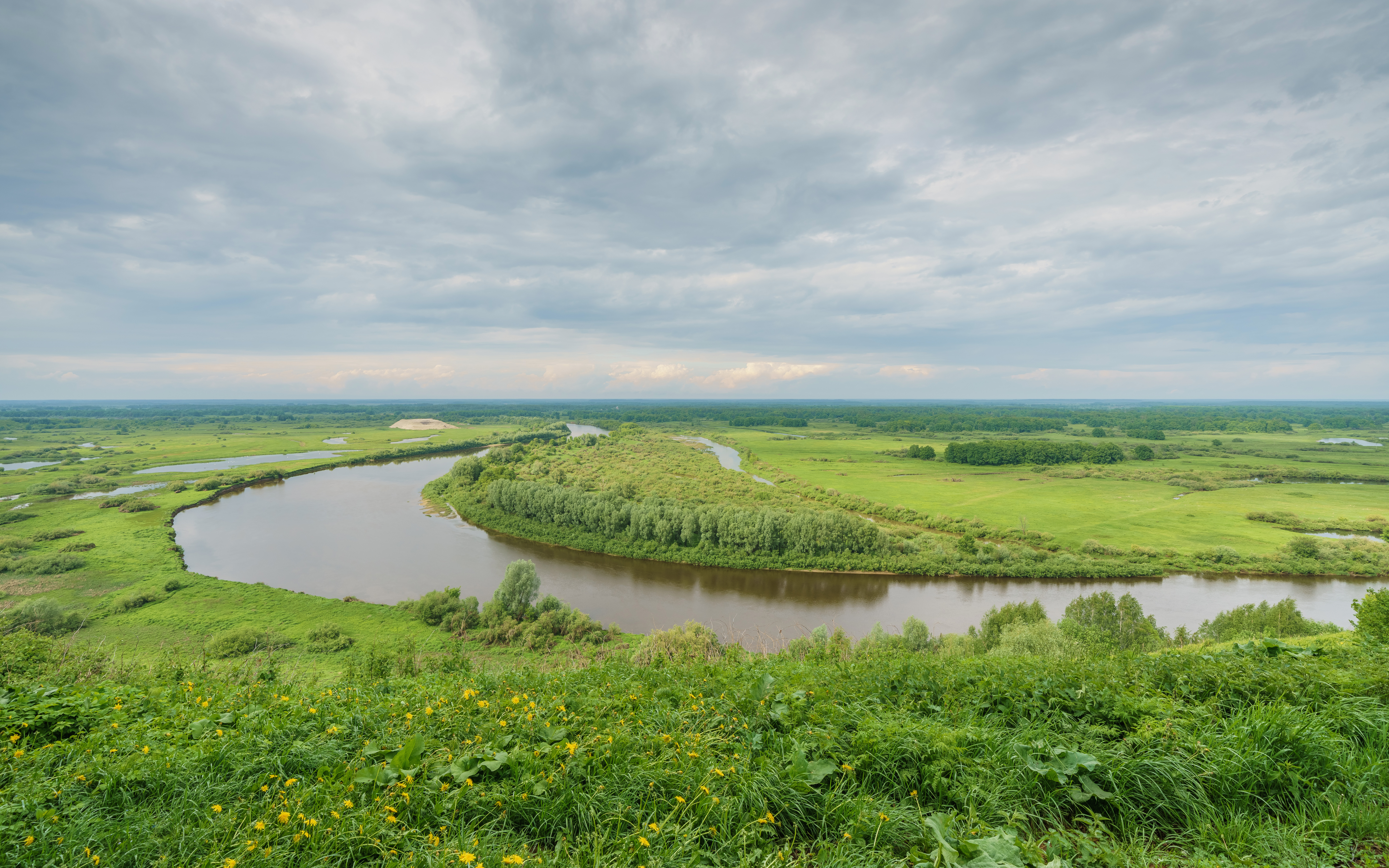
- Klyazma River at Vyazniki

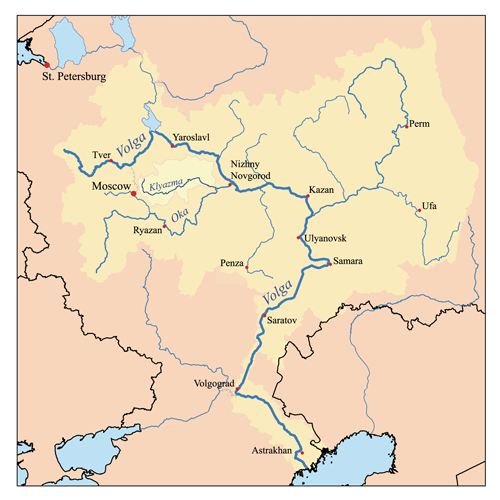
- Map of the Volga watershed with the Klyazma highlighted
- Native name: Клязьма (Russian)

Location
- Country: Russia

Physical characteristics
- Mouth: Oka
  - coordinates: 56°10′05″N 42°58′09″E
- Length: 686 km (426 mi)
- Basin size: 42,500 km^{2} (16,400 sq mi)

Basin features
- Progression: Oka→ Volga→ Caspian Sea

The Klyazma (Russian: Клязьма, IPA: [ˈklʲæzʲmə], Klyaz'ma or Kliazma), a river in the Moscow, Nizhny Novgorod, Ivanovo and Vladimir Oblasts in Russia, and a left tributary of the Oka.

The 686 kilometres (426 mi) long river's drainage basin is 42,500 square kilometres (16,400 sq mi). The Klyazma usually freezes up in November and stays under the ice until mid-April, although in faster-moving stretches ice-free water occurs until the air temperature drops below −10 °C (14 °F).

The largest tributaries of the Klyazma include (from source to mouth):

- Ucha (left)
- Vorya (left)
- Sherna (left)
- Kirzhach (left)
- Peksha (left)
- Polya (right)
- Koloksha (left)
- Nerl (left)
- Sudogda (right)
- Nerekhta (right)
- Uvod (left)
- Teza (left)
- Lukh (left)
- Suvoroshch (right)

The Klyazma is navigable within 120 kilometres (75 mi) from its estuary and in the area of the Klyazminskoye Reservoir. The cities of Gorokhovets, Mendeleyevo, Pavlovsky Posad, Vladimir, Kovrov, Shchyolkovo, Losino-Petrovsky, Noginsk, Orekhovo-Zuyevo, Sobinka and Vyazniki stand on the shores of the Klyazma River.

The basin of the Klyazma formed the center of the Vladimir-Suzdal principality in the 12th to 14th centuries CE.
