= Torpedo Nizhny Novgorod =

Professional ice hockey club based in Nizhny Novgorod, Russia

- City: Nizhny Novgorod
- League: KHL 2008–present: RSL 1996–1998, 1999–2001, 2003–2004, 2007–2008; Vysshaya Liga 1998–1999, 2002–2003, 2004–2007; IHL 1992–1996; Soviet League Class A 1954–1992; Soviet League Class B 1947–1954
- Conference: Western
- Division: Bobrov
- Founded: 1946
- Home arena: Volga Arena (capacity: 12,350)
- Colours
- Owner: The government of Nizhegorodskaya oblast
- General manager: Yevgeni Zabuga
- Head coach: Alexei Isakov
- Captain: Vladimir Tkachyov
- Affiliates: Chaika (MHL)
- Website: hctorpedo.ru

Franchise history
- 1946–1991: Torpedo Gorky
- 1991–present: Torpedo Nizhny Novgorod

Current uniform
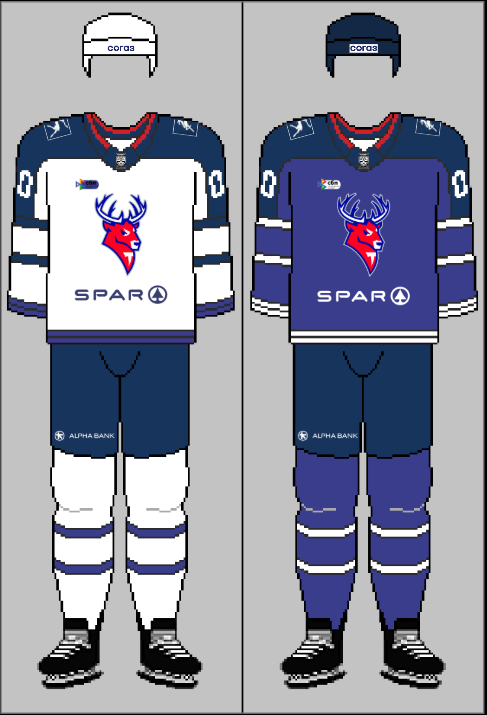

Torpedo Nizhny Novgorod (Russian: Торпедо Нижний Новгород) is a professional ice hockey club in Nizhny Novgorod, Russia. It is a member of the Bobrov Division in the Kontinental Hockey League (KHL).

The team's home arena is Volga Arena. The team used to play its home games at Trade Union Sport Palace, and also at Konovalenko Sports Palace, named after Viktor Konovalenko – one of the most famous Soviet goaltenders, who played for the Torpedoes.

== History ==
The first official ice hockey tournament in Gorky (the Communist-era name of Nizhny Novgorod) took place in early 1947, when the team was the winner of the first Avtozavodtsev Cup. In the 1947–48 season, the team was in the national championship. It was the official sports club of the submarine service of the Soviet Navy. The 1960–61 season was the most significant in the history of Torpedo, with the team winning the Avtozavodtsev Cup and the Soviet Sport Cup, reaching the final of the Cup of the Soviet Union, and finally winning the silver medal in the national championship. Torpedo was the first provincial team to place in the USSR championship in 1961. Gorkovchan's success that year is attributed, primarily, to head coach Dmitry Boginova, who managed to create a strong and cohesive team in just a few years. Goalie Konovalenko was later a two-time Olympic champion and eight-time world champion.

Twice the team fell just short of the bronze in 1982 and 1985. In the 1980s, Gorky twice won the Thunderstorm Authority prize. The Torpedo players in those years were constantly being called to different teams, with some seasons including the loss of up to ten players to other teams. In the championships of the MHL, RHL and Russia, which have been held since the Soviet collapse, Torpedo has not achieved significant success, with the best year in 1995, when the team placed fourth in the playoffs of the MHL championship.

== Season-by-season KHL record ==
Note: GP = Games played, W = Wins, OTW = Overtime Wins, OTL = Overtime Losses, SOW = Shootout Wins, SOL = Shootout Losses, L = Losses, GF = Goals for, GA = Goals against, Pts = Points

Season	GP	W	L	OTL	Pts	GF	GA	Finish	Top Scorer	Playoffs
2008–09	56	24	24	1	84	162	162	3rd, Chernyshev	Pavel Brendl (50 points: 35 G, 15 A; 56 GP)	Lost in preliminary round, 0-3 (Metallurg Magnitogorsk)
2009–10	56	22	27	4	75	154	163	4th, Tarasov	Pavel Brendl (37 points: 27 G, 10 A; 51 GP)	Did not qualify
2010–11	54	18	25	2	73	144	151	5th, Tarasov	Matt Ellison (50 points: 21 G, 29 A; 53 GP)	Did not qualify
2011–12	54	24	17	2	91	157	132	1st, Tarasov	Martin Thörnberg (39 points: 20 G, 19 A; 49 GP)	Lost in Conference Semifinals, 2-4 (Dynamo Moscow)
2012–13	52	19	23	4	69	142	146	6th, Tarasov	Dmitri Makarov (43 points: 13 G, 30 A; 52 GP)	Did not qualify
2013–14	54	32	17	5	91	153	121	3rd, Kharlamov	Sakari Salminen (48 points: 18 G, 30 A; 54 GP)	Lost in Conference Quarterfinals, 3-4 (Salavat Yulaev Ufa)
2014–15	60	30	22	8	90	153	144	4th, Tarasov	Sakari Salminen (47 points: 18 G, 29 A; 60 GP)	Lost in Conference Quarterfinals, 1-4 (SKA St. Petersburg)
2015–16	60	33	16	11	100	163	137	5th, Tarasov	Kaspars Daugaviņš (35 points: 14 G, 21 A; 44 GP)	Lost in Conference Semifinals, 1-4 (CSKA Moscow)
2016–17	60	32	18	7	104	145	124	4th, Tarasov	Dmitri Semin (32 points: 14 G, 18 A; 60 GP)	Lost in Conference Quarterfinals, 1-4 (Dynamo Moscow)
2017–18	56	29	19	8	89	116	127	3rd, Tarasov	Egor Dugin (29 points: 12 G, 17 A; 52 GP)	Lost in Conference Quarterfinals, 0-4 (Lokomotiv Yaroslavl)
2018–19	62	27	25	10	64	176	193	4th, Kharlamov	Andrew Calof (41 points: 22 G, 19 A; 58 GP)	Lost in Conference Quarterfinals, 3-4 (Barys Astana)
2019–20	62	29	27	6	64	165	167	4th, Tarasov	Jordan Schroeder (41 points: 19 G, 22 A; 60 GP)	Lost in Conference Quarterfinals, 0-4 (CSKA Moscow)
2020–21	60	29	22	9	67	170	168	5th, Kharlamov	Damir Zhafyarov (61 points: 21 G, 40 A; 58 GP)	Lost in Conference Quarterfinals, 0-4 (Ak Bars Kazan)
2021–22	47	21	19	7	49	117	113	4th, Kharlamov	Damir Zhafyarov (45 points: 18 G, 27 A; 47 GP)	Did not qualify
2022–23	68	42	20	6	90	204	172	2nd, Bobrov	Nikolai Kovalenko (54 points: 21 G, 33 A; 56 GP)	Lost in Conference Semifinals, 0-4 (SKA St. Petersburg)
2023–24	68	34	27	7	75	189	180	3rd, Bobrov	Maxim Letunov (48 points: 25 G, 23 A; 66 GP)	Lost in Last 16, 1-4 (SKA St. Petersburg)
2024–25	68	31	28	9	71	204	196	3rd, Bobrov	Nikita Artamonov (39 points: 22 G, 17 A; 63 GP)	Lost in Last 16, 0-4 (Lokomotiv Yaroslavl)
2025–26	68	37	24	7	81	191	191	2nd, Bobrov	Yegor Vinogradov (54 points: 23 G, 31 A; 67 GP)	Lost in Quarterfinals, 1-4 (Metallurg Magnitogorsk)

== Players ==
=== Current roster ===
Updated 25 September 2026.

No.	Nat	Player	Pos	S/G	Age	Acquired	Birthplace
93	(Belarus)	Andrei Belevich	C	L	29	2019	Grodno, Belarus
44	(Kazakhstan)	Dmitri Breus	D	R	22	2023	Almaty, Kazakhstan
8	(United States)	Scooter Brickey	D	R	27	2026	Mt. Clemens, Michigan, United States
73	(Russia)	Yaroslav Dyblenko	D	L	32	2026	Surgut, Russia
10	(Russia)	Vladislav Firstov	LW	L	25	2024	Yaroslavl, Russia
41	(Russia)	Viktor Fyodorov	C	L	18	2025	Tomsk, Russia
68	(Russia)	Amir Garayev	C	L	25	2025	Bugulma, Russia
89	(Russia)	Igor Geraskin	RW	L	28	2026	Klin, Russia
27	(Russia)	Sergei Goncharuk	F	L	27	2019	Tolyatti, Russia
21	(Russia)	Nikita Kamalov	D	L	31	2026	Novokuznetsk, Russia
6	(Russia)	Bogdan Konyushkov	D	R	23	2022	Penza, Russia
72	(Russia)	Denis Kostin	G	L	31	2025	Omsk, Russia
63	(Russia)	Pavel Kraskovsky (A)	C	L	30	2026	Yaroslavl, Russia
77	(United States)	Bobby Nardella	D	L	30	2025	Rosemont, Illinois, United States
24	(Russia)	Alexander Pelevin	D	L	22	2024	Balakhna, Russia
14	(Russia)	Matvei Polyakov	RW	L	22	2026	Saratov, Russia
97	(Russia)	Daniil Seroukh	LW	R	29	2026	Gorkovsky, Russia
80	(Russia)	Nikita Shavin	F	L	24	2021	Knyaginino, Russia
30	(Russia)	Dmitri Shugayev	G	L	28	2026	Yaroslavl, Russia
36	(Russia)	Anton Sizov (A)	D	L	31	2025	Mozhaisk, Russia
9	(Russia)	Sergei Skvortsov	LW	R	17	2026	Semyonov, Russia
43	(Russia)	Kirill Svishchyov	C	L	21	2023	Nizhnevartovsk, Russia
55	(Russia)	Vladimir Tkachyov (C)	C	L	33	2025	Dnipro, Ukraine
91	(United States)	Mike Vecchione	LW	R	33	2026	Saugus, Massachusetts, United States
92	(Russia)	Yegor Vinogradov	C	L	23	2021	Nizhny Novgorod, Russia
42	(Russia)	Mikhail Vorobyev	C	L	29	2026	Salavat, Russia
61	(Russia)	Alexei Yakovlev	LW	L	31	2026	Novosibirsk, Russia
2	(Russia)	Daniil Zhuravlyov	D	L	26	2025	Nizhny Novgorod, Russia

=== NHL alumni ===
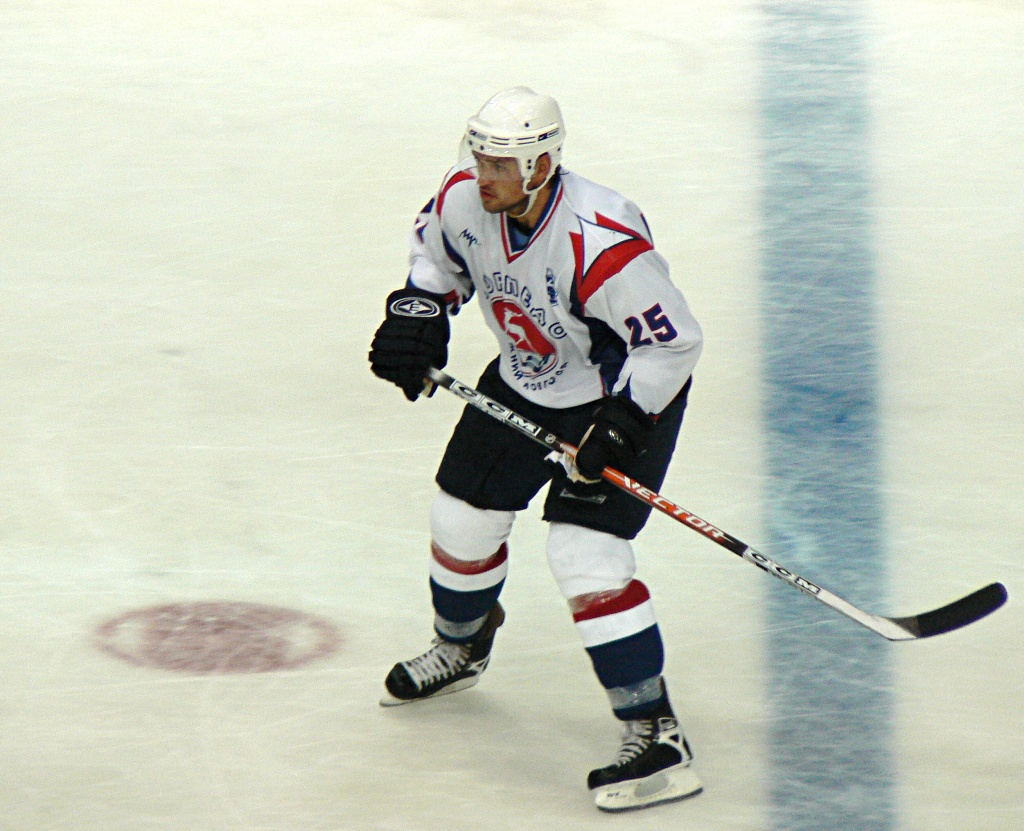
Yuri Butsayev, formerly of Torpedo

- (Soviet Union) Evgeny Namestnikov (1988–91)
- (Russia) Pavel Torgaev (1995–96, 1999–2000)
- (Russia) Alexei Tezikov (1998–2000, 2001–02)
- (Russia) Artem Chubarov (1999–2004)
- (Russia) Yuri Butsayev (2007–09)
- (Canada) Matt Ellison (2010–13)
- (Canada) Charles Linglet (2010–11)
- (United States) Ryan Vesce (2010–12)
- (Canada) Wojtek Wolski (2013–15)
- (United States) Chris Wideman (2020–21)

=== All-time records ===
- RSL/KHL Games – Anatoli Vodopianov – 653 games
- Games – Oleg Namestnikov, 720 games
- RSL/KHL Goals – Alexander Skvortsov, 244
- RSL/KHL Assists – Alexander Skvortsov, 204
- RSL/KHL Points – Alexander Skvortsov, 448
- PIM – Vladimir Kovin – 570 minutes

== Honours ==
=== Champions ===
(gold) Vysshaya Liga (2): 2003, 2007
(gold) Steel Cup (1): 2015
(gold) Dukla Cup (1): 2016
(gold) Bodense Cup (1): 2017

=== Runners-up ===
(silver) Soviet League Championship (1): 1961
(silver) USSR Cup (1): 1961
(silver) Spengler Cup (1): 1972
