= Vladimir, Russia =

City in Vladimir Oblast, Russia

Vladimir Владимир
- City
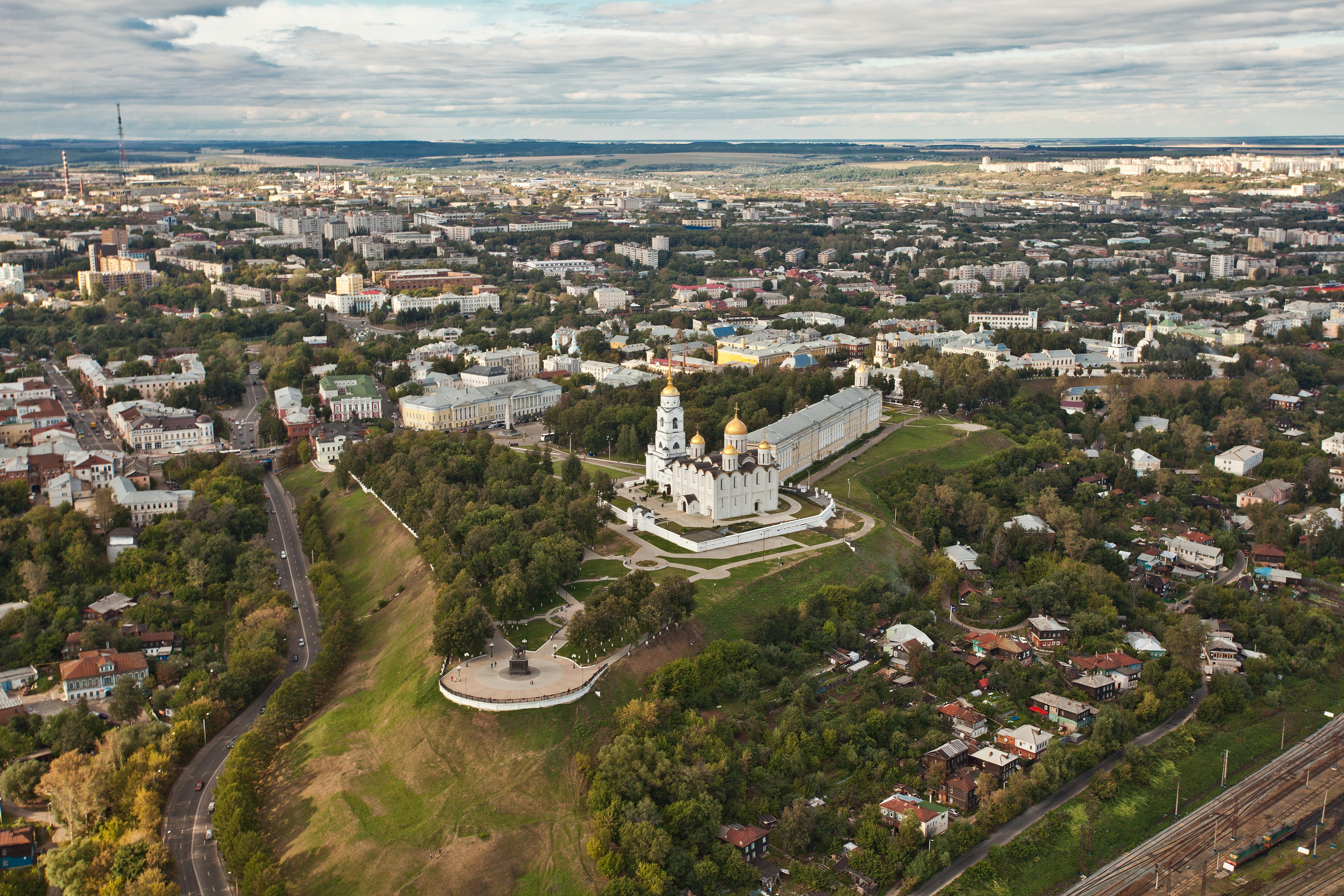
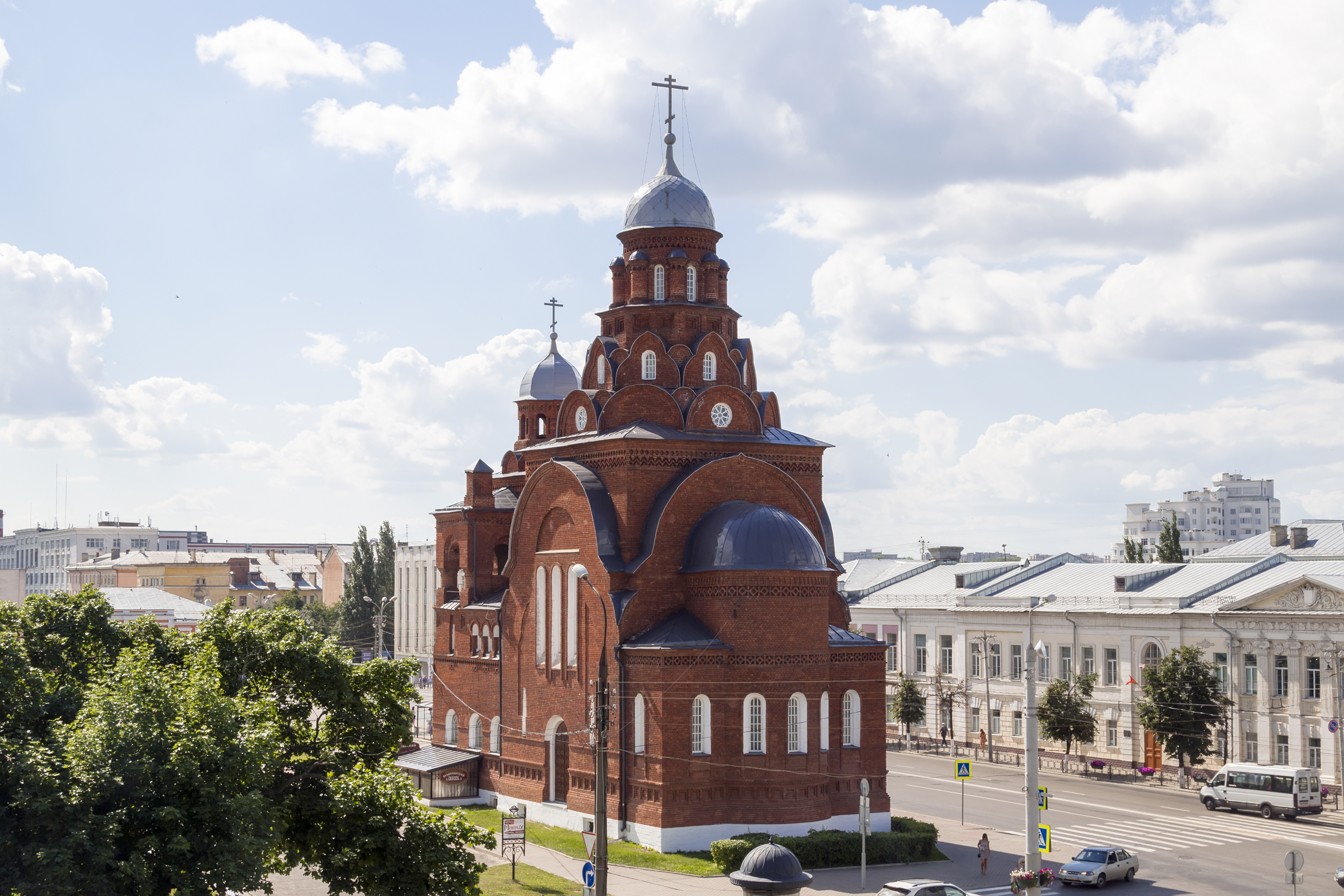
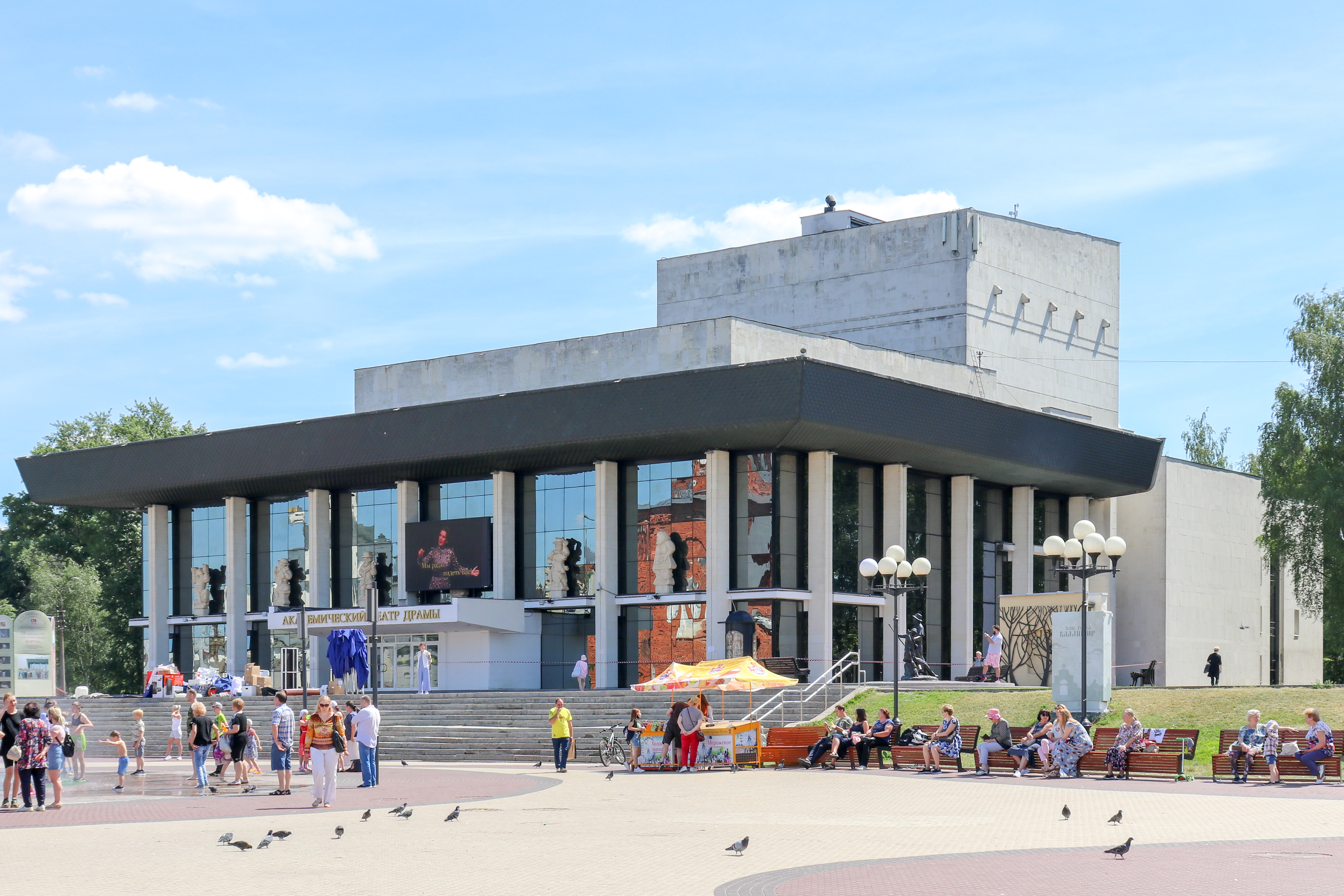
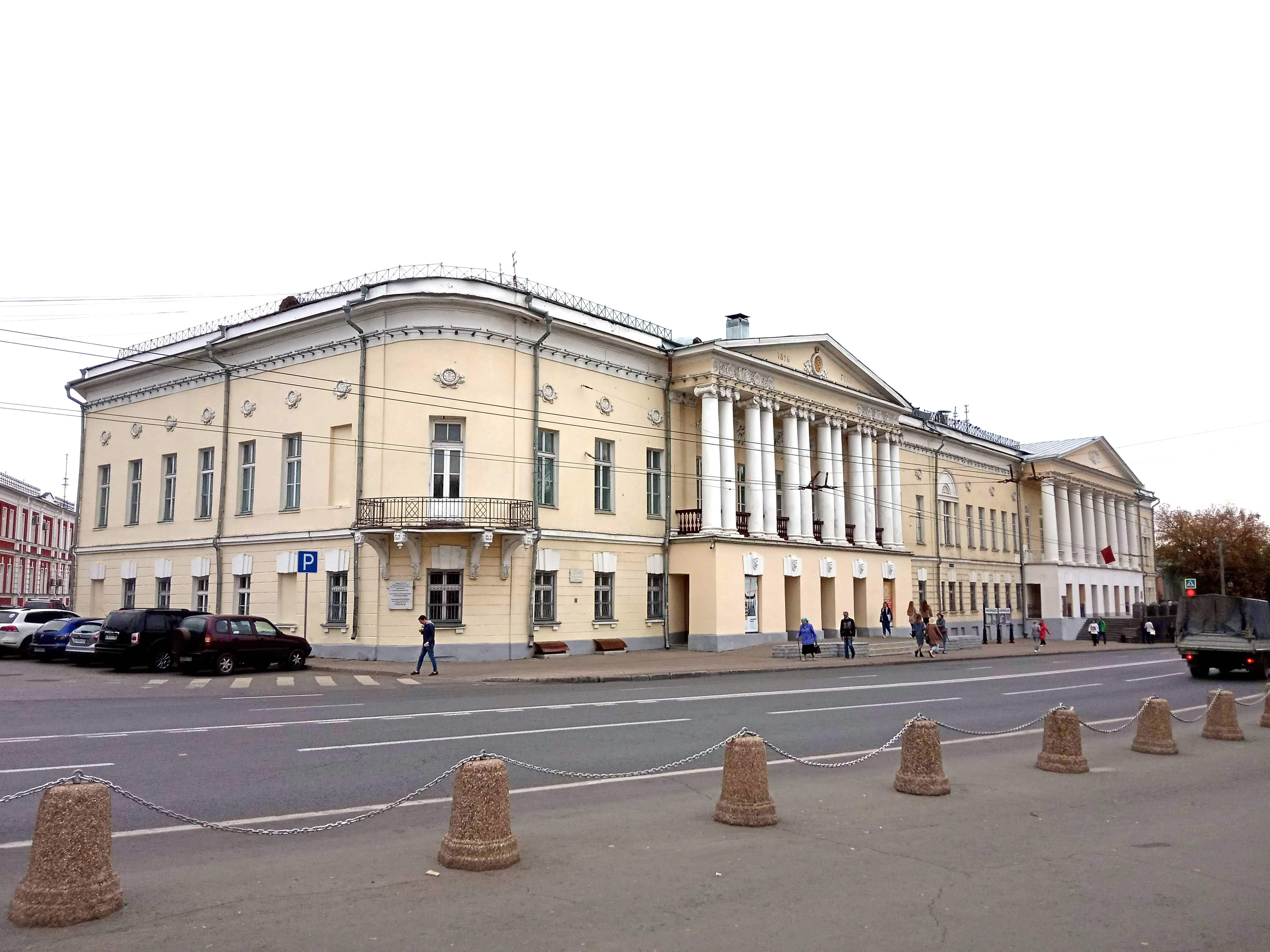
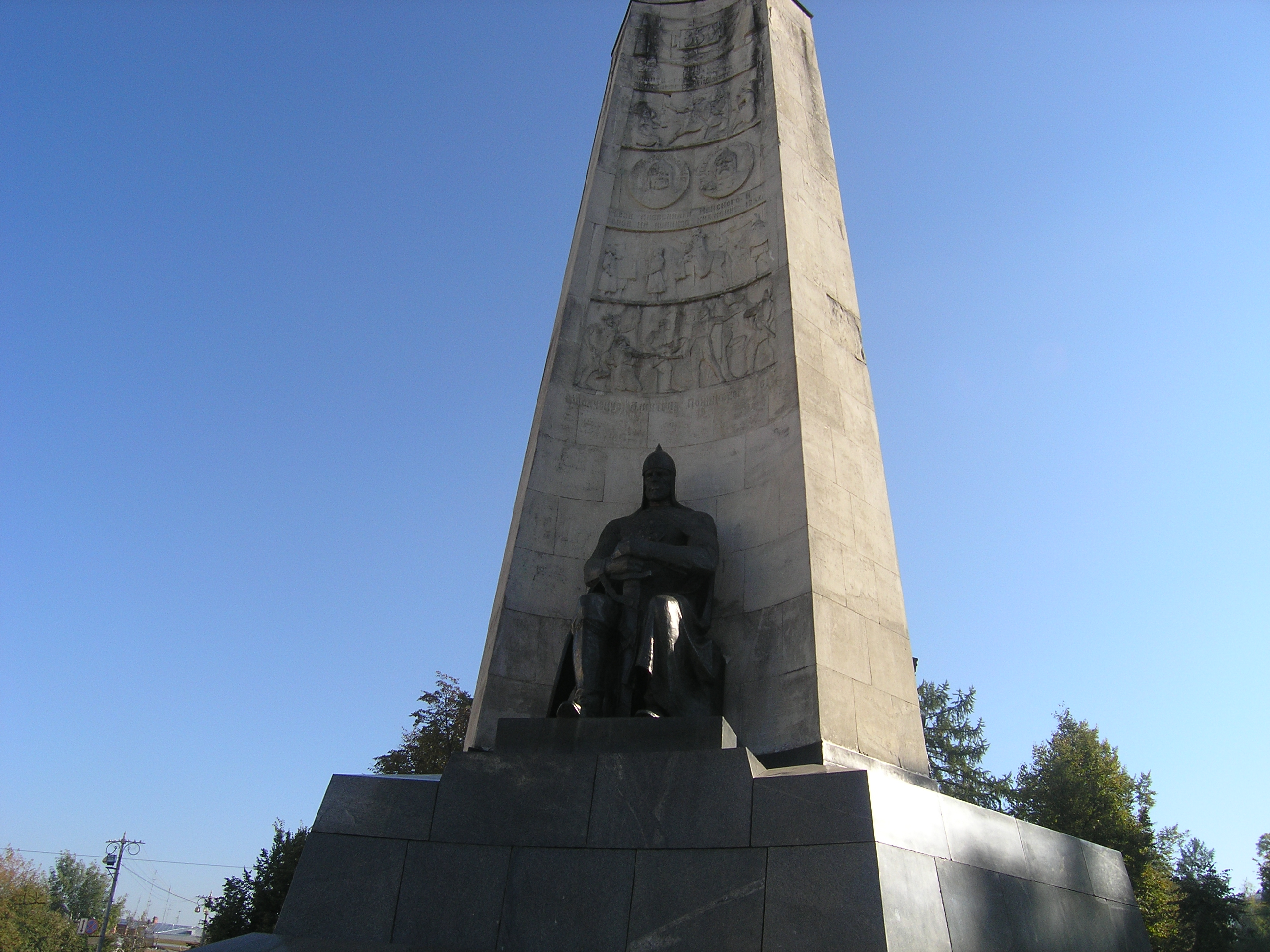
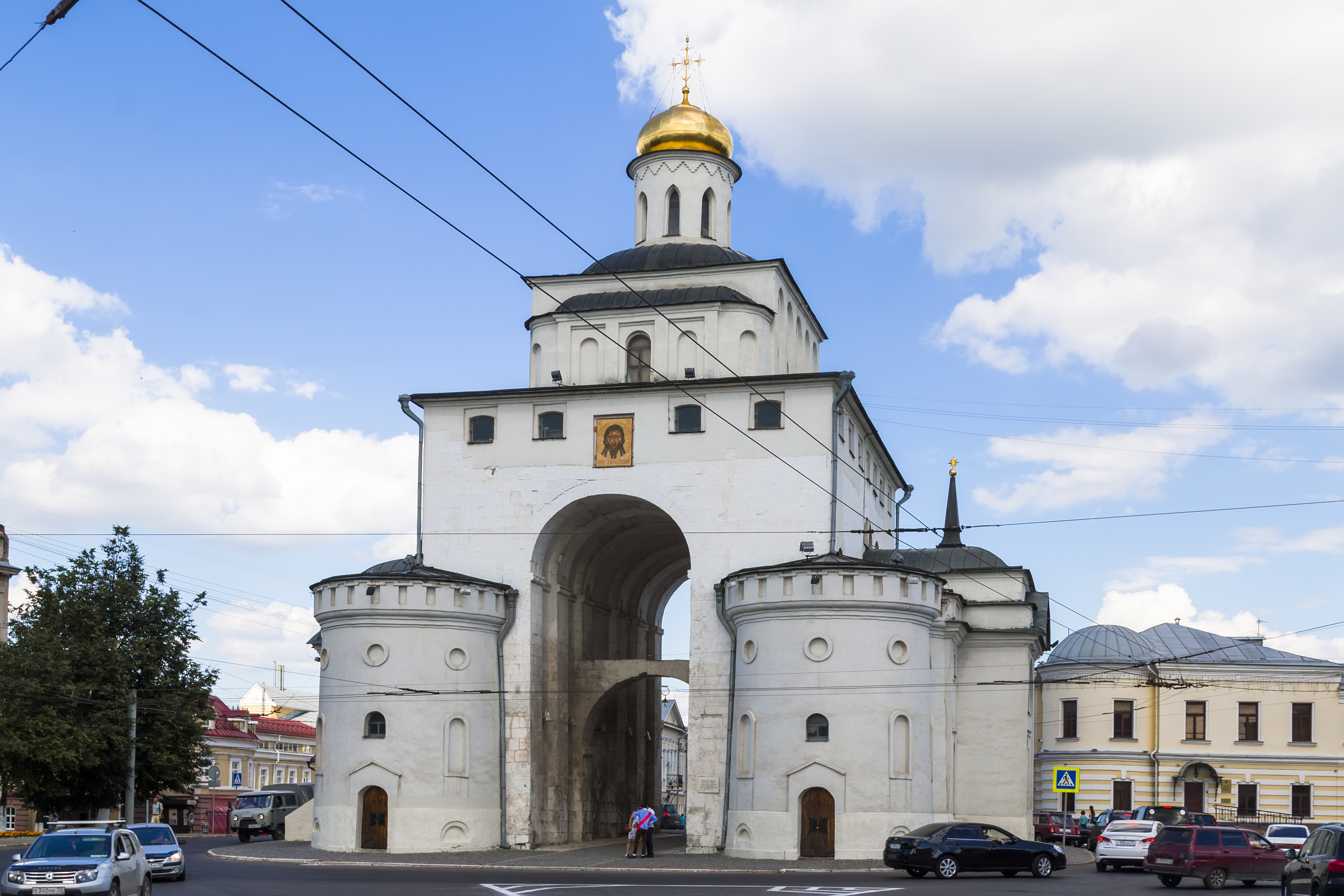
- Dormition Cathedral Trinity Church Vladimir Academic Drama Theater Center for Culture and Art on Sobornaya Monument to the 850th Anniversary of Vladimir Golden Gate, Vladimir

- Flag Coat of arms
- Interactive map of Vladimir
- Location of Vladimir Vladimir (European Russia) Vladimir (Russia) Vladimir (Europe)
- Coordinates: 56°07′43″N 40°24′21″E
- Country: Russia
- Federal subject: Vladimir Oblast
- First mentioned: 990

Government
  - Body: Council of People's Deputies
  - Head: Dmitry Naumov

Area
  - Total: 124.59 km^{2} (48.10 sq mi)
- Elevation: 150 m (490 ft)

Population (2010 Census)
  - Total: 345,373
  - Estimate (2025): 341,579 (−1.1%)
  - Rank: 51st in 2010
  - Density: 2,772.1/km^{2} (7,179.6/sq mi)

Administrative status
  - Subordinated to: City of Vladimir
  - Capital of: Vladimir Oblast, City of Vladimir

Municipal status
  - Urban okrug: Vladimir Urban Okrug
  - Capital of: Vladimir Urban Okrug
- Time zone: UTC+3 (MSK)
- Postal codes: 600000, 600001, 600003, 600005–600009, 600014–600018, 600020–600028, 600031–600033, 600035–600038, 600700, 600950, 600960, 600970, 600980, 600999, 992800
- Dialing code: +7 4922
- OKTMO ID: 17701000001
- City Day: The first Sunday of September
- Website: www.vladimir-city.ru

Vladimir (Russian: Влади́мир, IPA: [vlɐ'dʲimʲɪr]) is a city and the administrative center of Vladimir Oblast, Russia, located on the Klyazma River, 200 kilometers (120 mi) east of Moscow. It is served by a railway and the M7 highway. Its population is 349,951 (2021 census).

== History ==
Vladimir was one of the medieval capitals of Russia, with significant buildings surviving from the 12th century. Two of its Russian Orthodox cathedrals, a monastery, and associated buildings have been designated among the White Monuments of Vladimir and Suzdal, a UNESCO World Heritage Site. In the past, the city was also known as Vladimir-on-Klyazma (Владимир-на-Клязьме) and Vladimir-Zalessky (Владимир-Залесский), to distinguish it from another Vladimir/Volodymyr in Volhynia (modern-day Ukraine).

=== Foundation ===
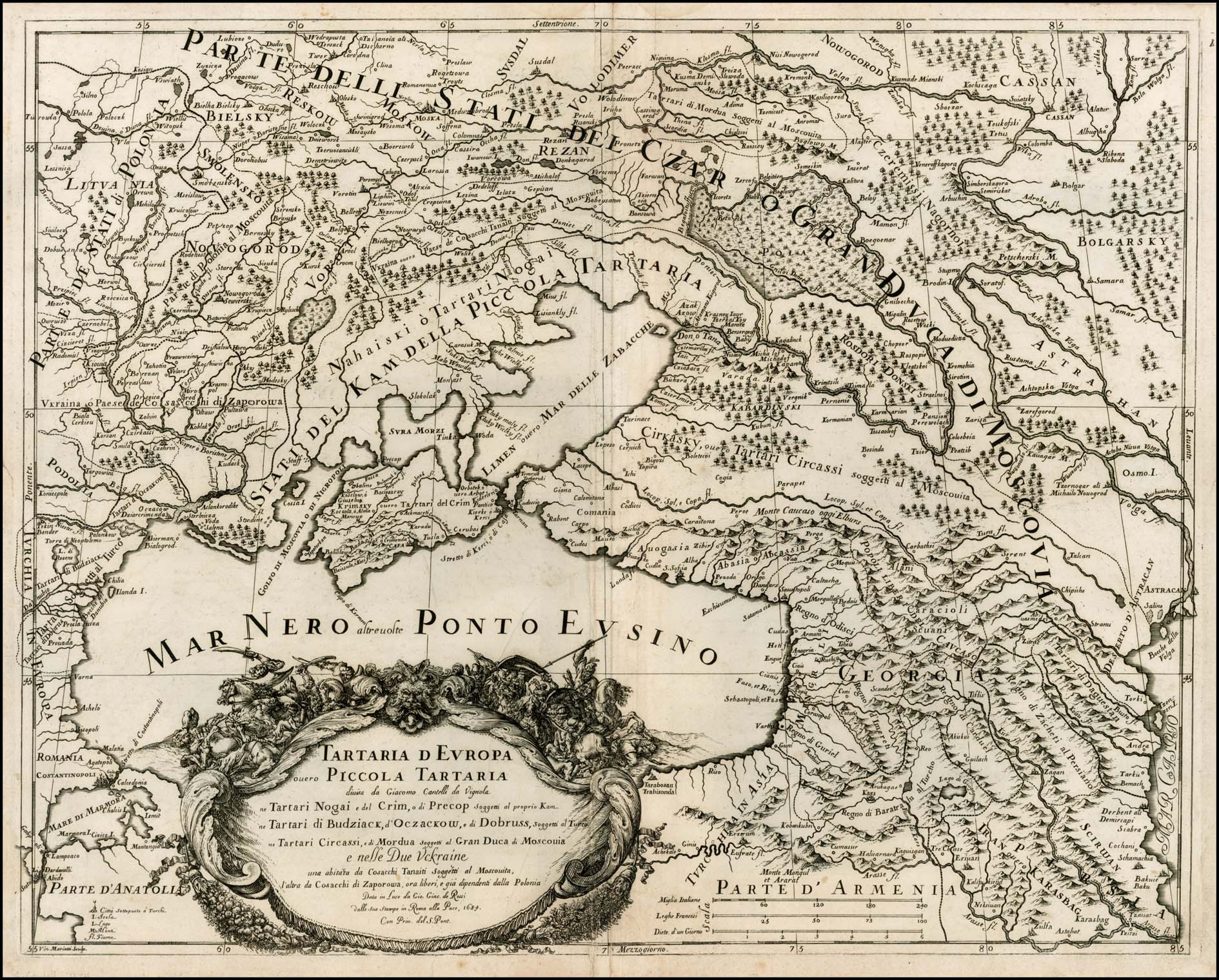
17th century map

The founding date of Vladimir is disputed between 990 and 1108. The city's founding is neither mentioned in the Primary Chronicle (PVL), nor the Synodal Scroll (Older recension) of the Novgorod First Chronicle (NPL). Only the 15th-century Commission Scroll of the Younger recension of the NPL states after "А се князи русстии" that Volodimer' Monomakh "поставилъ град Володимерь ЗалЂшьскыи в Суждальскои землЂ" ("founded the city of Volodimer' Zalěsh'kyi in the Suzhdalian Land"), but without naming a year. In the 16th-century Lvov Chronicle, Vladimir's founding is specifically mentioned under the year 6616 (1108): "свершенъ бысть градъ Владимеръ Залѣшьскій Володимеромъ Маномахомъ" ("the town of Vladimer'-Zalěsh'kij was founded by Volodimer' Manomakh". During the Soviet period, this year was decreed to be its foundation year with the view that attributes the founding of the city, and its name, to Vladimir Monomakh, who inherited the region as part of the Rostov-Suzdal Principality in 1093. It is named there as Vladimir. The chronicles also describe how inhabitants from neighbouring towns, namely Suzdal and Rostov, alluded to Vladimir as a young town. Accordingly, the 850th anniversary of the city foundation was celebrated in 1958, with many monuments from the celebrations adorning the city; this enabled Nikita Khrushchev, who recently took power in the Soviet Union, to link his administration with early Russian history.

In the 1990s, a new opinion developed that the city was instead founded in 990 by Vladimir the Great, with local historians supporting the alternative foundation date and citing various chronicle sources. Scholars reinterpreted certain passages in the Hypatian Codex, which mentions that the region was visited by Vladimir the Great, the "father" of Russian Orthodoxy, in 990, so as to move the city foundation date to that year. The Charter of Vladimir, the basic law of the city passed in 2005, explicitly mentions 990 as the date of the city's foundation. The city administration officially recognizes 990 as the foundation date.

In 2006 a memorial was built in the Knyaz-Vladimirskoe cemetery, commemorating Japanese POWs, and representatives of other nations who were held in the prison. Earlier, in 1993, a memorial plaque was attached to the wall of the Bogoroditse-Rozhdestvenskoe monastery, occupied since 1918 by the Cheka and its successors until 1991.

=== Vladimir-Suzdal ===
The city's most historically significant events occurred after the turn of the 12th century. Serving its original purpose as a defensive outpost for the Rostov-Suzdal Principality, Vladimir had little political or military influence throughout the reign of Vladimir Monomakh (1113–1125), or his son Yury Dolgoruky ("Far-Reaching") (1154–1157).

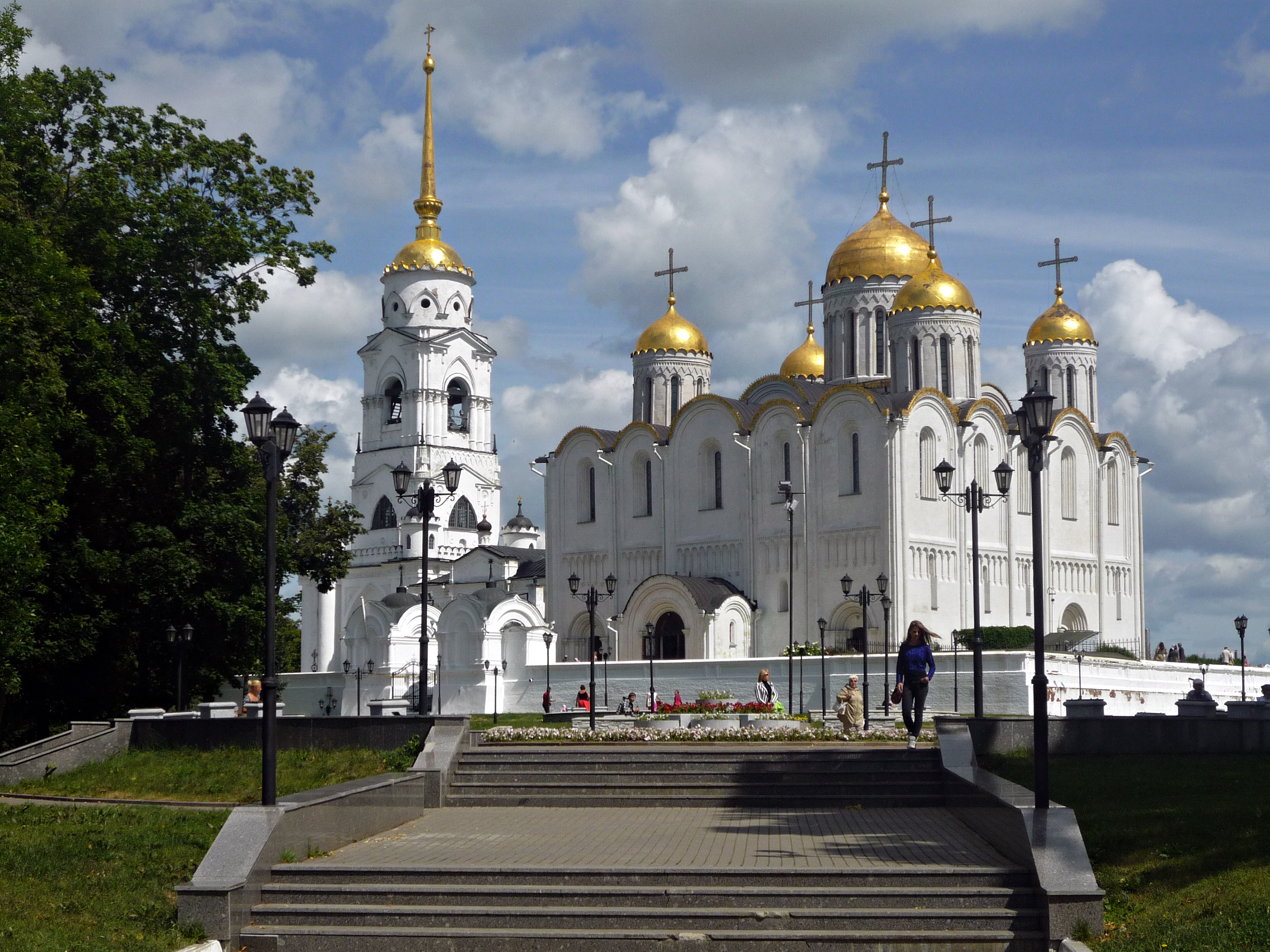
Dormition Cathedral was a venerated model for cathedrals all over Russia

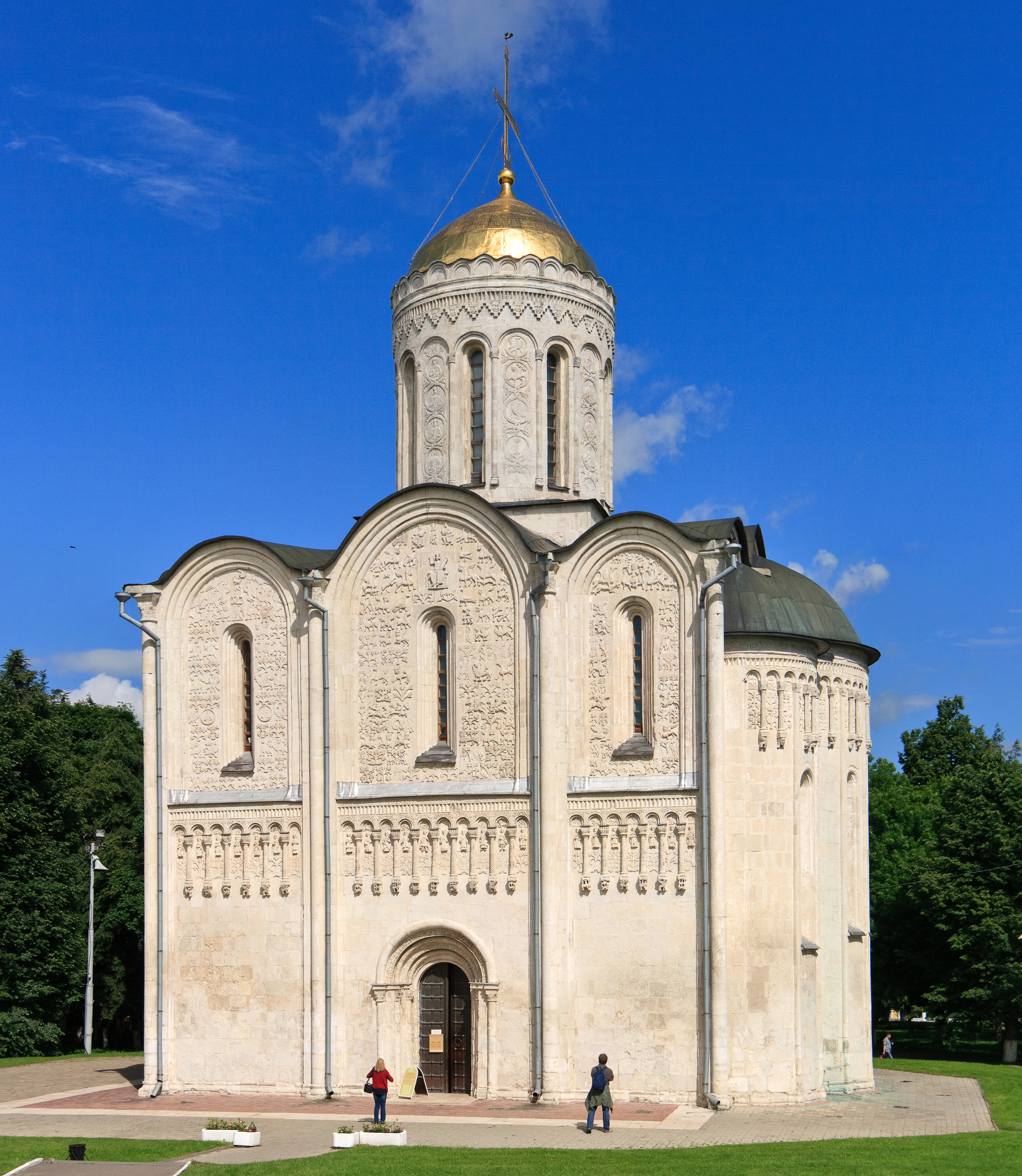
St. Demetrius' Cathedral, shown on this 2017 photo, is famous for its masterfully carved exterior, representing the Biblical story of King David.

Under Dolgoruky's son, Andrey Bogolyubsky (1157–1175) (also known as Andrew the Pious), the city became the center of the Vladimir-Suzdal Principality. It had a Golden Age, which lasted until the Mongol invasion of Rus' in 1237. During this time, Vladimir enjoyed immense growth and prosperity. Andrey oversaw the building of the city's Golden Gates and the Dormition Cathedral. In 1164, Andrey attempted to establish a new metropolitanate in Vladimir, separate from that of Kiev. He was rebuffed by the Patriarch of Constantinople.

Scores of Russian, German, and Georgian masons worked on Vladimir's white stone cathedrals, monastery, towers, and palaces. Unlike any other northern buildings, their exterior was elaborately carved with high relief stone sculptures. Only three of these edifices stand today: the Dormition Cathedral, the Cathedral of Saint Demetrius, and the Golden Gate. They are included among the White Monuments of Vladimir and Suzdal, designated as a UNESCO World Heritage Site. During Andrey's reign, a royal palace in Bogolyubovo was built, as well as the world-famous Church of the Intercession on the Nerl, now considered one of the jewels of ancient Russian architecture. Andrey was assassinated at his palace at Bogolyubovo in 1175.

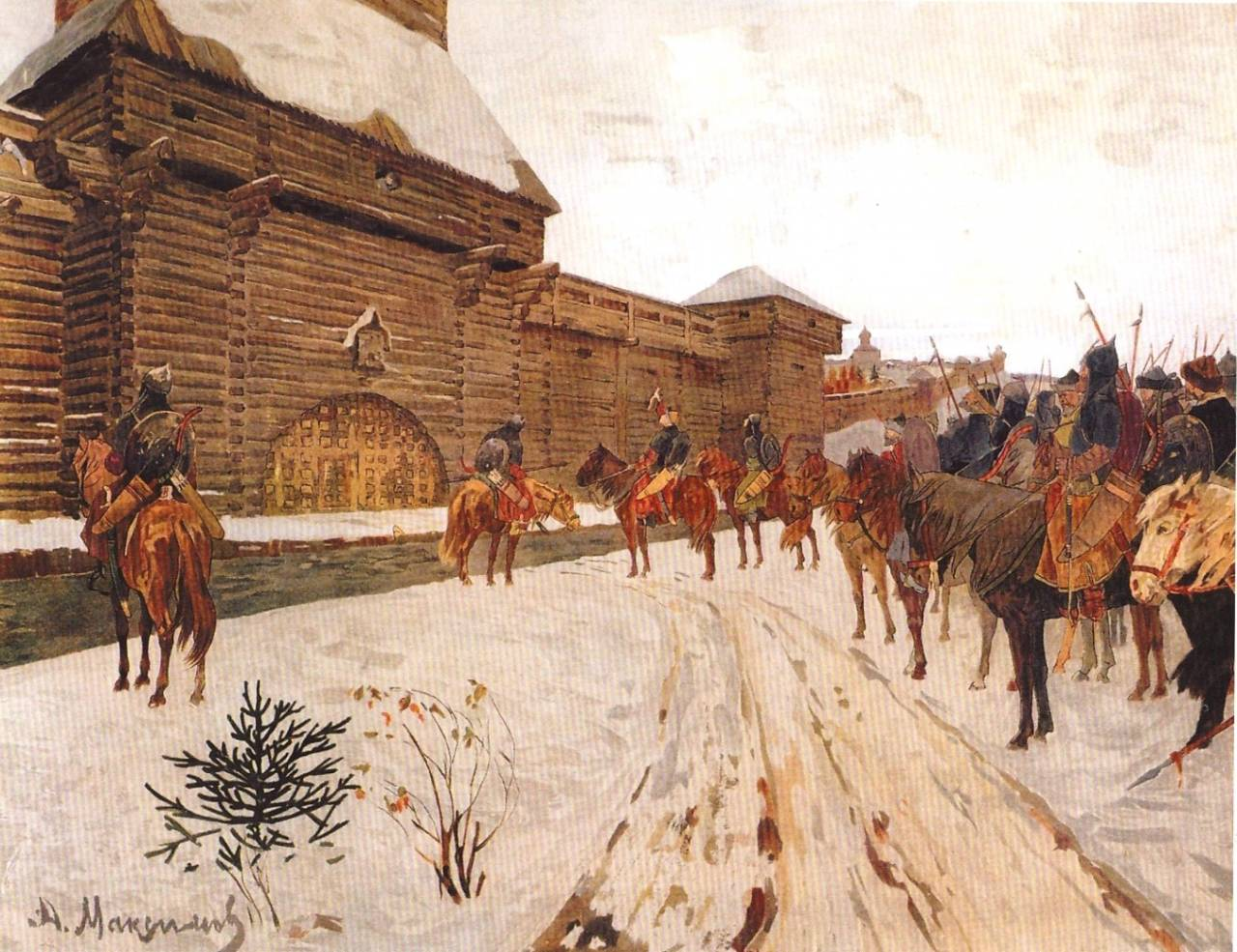
Drawing of Mongols of the Golden Horde outside Vladimir presumably demanding submission before sacking the city

Vladimir was besieged by the Mongol-Tatars of the Golden Horde under Batu Khan. It was finally overrun on February 8, 1238. A great fire destroyed thirty-two limestone buildings on the first day alone, while the grand prince's family perished in a church where they sought refuge from the flames. The grand prince escaped, but was killed at the Battle of the Sit River the following month.

=== Grand Principality of Moscow ===
After the Mongols, Vladimir never fully recovered. The most important Rus' prince (usually the Prince of Moscow, but sometimes a Tver or another principality) was styled the Grand Prince of Vladimir, but the title had become an honorific symbol of majesty. From 1299 to 1325, the city was seat of the metropolitans of Kiev and All Rus', until Metropolitan Peter moved the See to Moscow in 1325.

The Grand Princes of Vladimir were originally crowned in Vladimir's Assumption Cathedral, but when Moscow superseded Vladimir in the 14th century as the seat of the Grand Prince, the Assumption Cathedral in the Moscow Kremlin became the site of their coronation. The Moscow cathedral was loosely copied by the Italian architect Aristotele Fioravanti from Vladimir's original.

After the rise of Moscow, Grand Princes of Moscow continued to build several new churches in Vladimir. Notable examples include the Annunciation Church at Snovitsy (ca. 1501), three kilometers northwest of the city, and a church in the Knyaginin Nunnery (ca. 1505), which today includes murals dating from 1648.

=== Imperial Russia ===
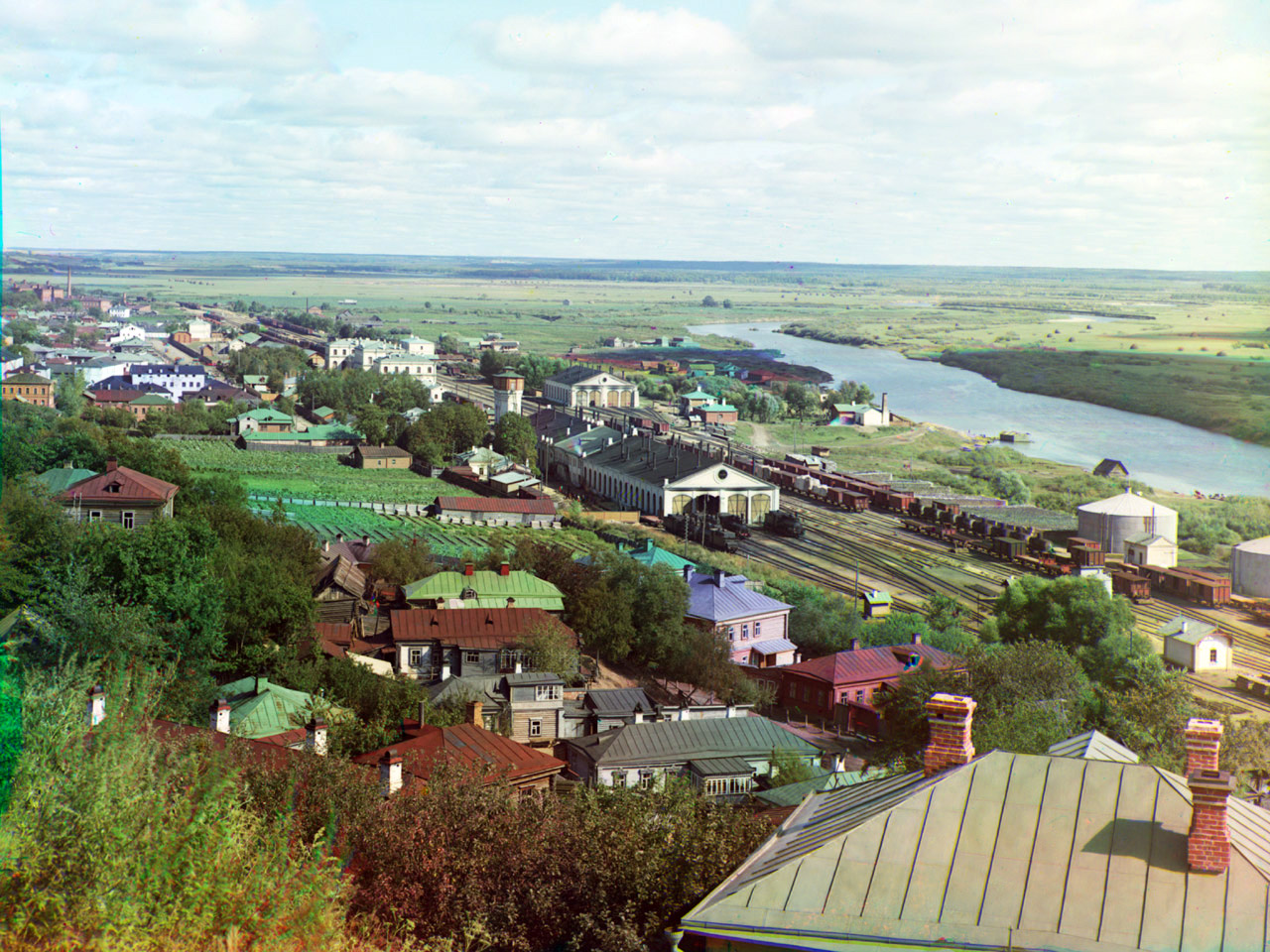
A view of Vladimir in 1911

Remains of the prince-saint Alexander Nevsky were kept in the ancient Nativity Abbey of Vladimir until 1703, when Peter the Great had them transferred to the Monastery (now Lavra) of Alexander Nevsky in St. Petersburg. The Nativity Church (built from 1191 to 1196) collapsed several years later, after workmen tried to fashion more windows in its walls in an effort to brighten the interior.

The city was the center of Vladimir Province, part of Moscow Governorate from its establishment by Peter the Great in 1708. Vladimir was separated from Moscow Governorate and made the center of a new Vladimir Viceroyalty by a ukase of Catherine the Great in 1778. In 1796, Paul I's administrative reform transformed the viceroyalty into the Vladimir Governorate in the same borders.

In the years 1838–1840, Alexander Herzen was exiled in Vladimir, passing through the city on the infamous Vladimirka.

In December 1858 the city began to operate telegraph. On June 14, 1861, the Moscow–Nizhny Novgorod Railway began to operate through Vladimir. In 1866, construction of a running water supply was completed, with telephone lines being put up in 1887 and the first electrical power lines on December 5, 1908.

On November 29, 1898, Vladimir provincial scientific archival commission was established.

=== Soviet Union ===
After the establishment of Soviet power, many streets were renamed in Vladimir; most of the parish churches were closed and condemned to be demolished.

In the first decades of Soviet rule industrialization occurred in Vladimir. On January 14, 1929, the Vladimir Governorate was abolished and the city became part of the newly formed Ivanovo Industrial Oblast.

On August 14, 1944, Vladimir became the administrative center of a new Vladimir Oblast carved from Ivanovo Oblast. In 1950 from the basis of the teachers' institute the Vladimir Pedagogical Institute was created. On November 5, 1952, the first trolleybus line began to operate in the city.

In 1958 the Vladimir–Suzdal Museum and Reserve was created, composed of a group of unique architectural monuments of Russian defense and church architecture. The monuments are located in three cities—Vladimir, Suzdal and Gus-Khrustalny—as well as villages of Bogolyubovo and Kideksha.

Architecture of the Soviet period is present in structures such as building complexes and polytechnic colleges, the Torpedo Stadium (built 1952), a reinforced concrete arch bridge over the river Klyaz'ma (1960), the Hotel Vladimir (1956), the Drama Theatre (1971) and others. In 1971 the city was awarded the Order of Red Banner of Labor.

== Administrative and municipal status ==
Historical population
Year	Pop.	±%
1897	28,479	—
1926	37,004	+29.9%
1939	66,797	+80.5%
1959	153,895	+130.4%
1970	234,087	+52.1%
1979	296,371	+26.6%
1989	349,702	+18.0%
2002	315,954	−9.7%
2010	345,373	+9.3%
2021	349,951	+1.3%
Source: Census data

Vladimir is the administrative center of the oblast. Within the framework of administrative divisions, it is, together with seventeen rural localities, incorporated as the City of Vladimir—an administrative unit with the status equal to that of the districts. As a municipal division, the City of Vladimir is incorporated as Vladimir Urban Okrug.

== Economy and military ==
Vladimir is home to several electrical and chemical factories, several food processing plants and two large thermal power stations. Tourism related to the historical sites is a major contributor to the city's economy.

The headquarters of the 27th Guards Rocket Army of the Strategic Missile Troops is located in the city. During the Cold War, Vladimir was host to the Dobrynskoye air force base.

== Transportation ==
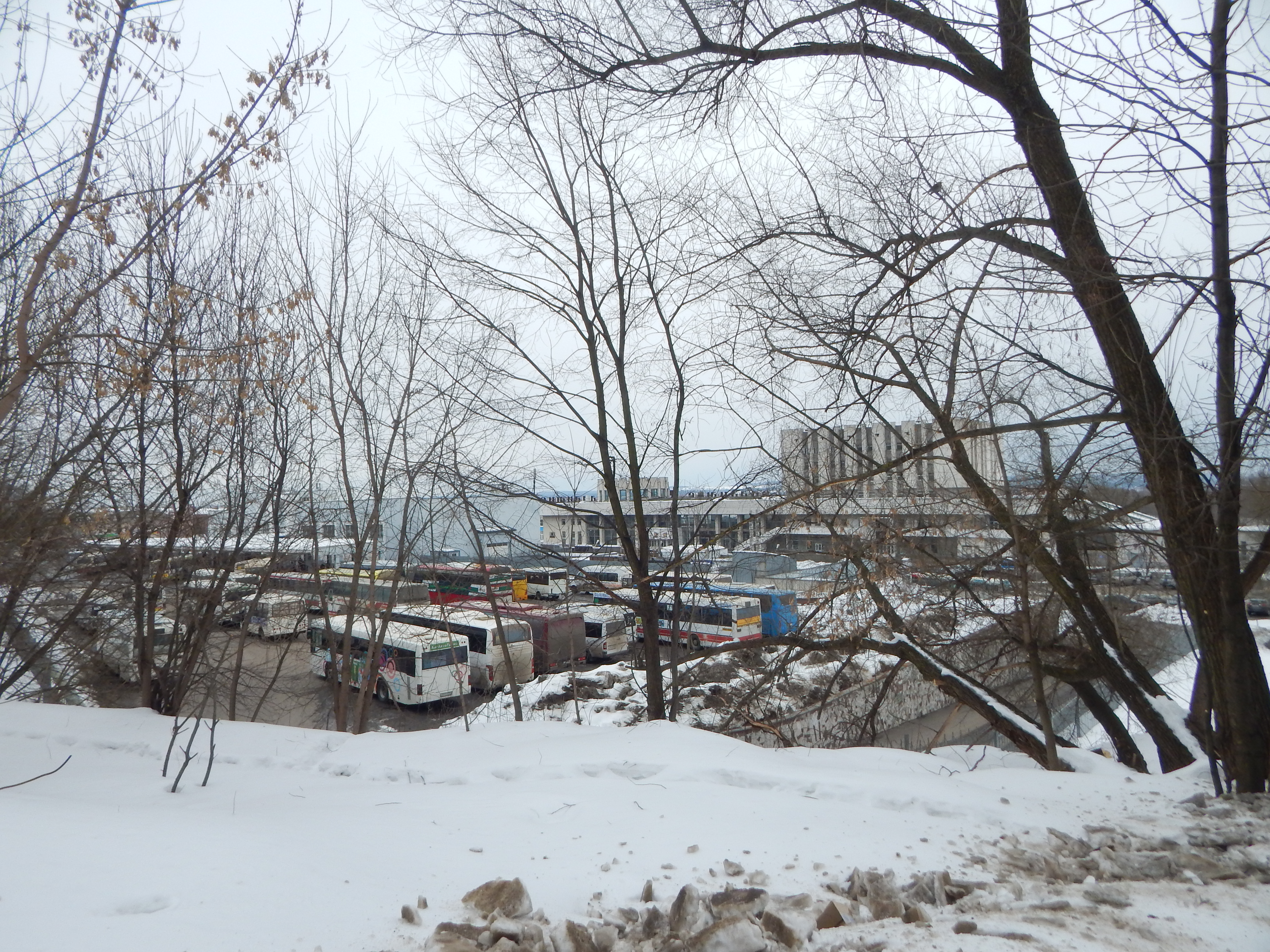
A view to railway station and a bus terminal

Since 1861, there has been a railway connection between Vladimir and Moscow. Vladimir is also linked to Moscow and Nizhny Novgorod by the M7 highway. Local transport includes buses, trolleybuses, fixed-route minivans, and taxis.

Vladimir bus service links the city to all the district centers of Vladimir Oblast, as well as Moscow, Ivanovo, Kostroma, Nizhny Novgorod, Ryazan, Yaroslavl and other cities.

At least 20 pairs of long-distance trains pass daily through Vladimir station, giving Vladimir year-round direct rail links to Moscow (Kursk Station), St. Petersburg and Nizhny Novgorod. Since the summer of 2010 Vladimir (on the Nizhny Novgorod line) is a stopping point for the "Peregrine Falcon" high-speed train.

Vladimir also possesses a developed suburban rail system. It was the only city in Russia with concurrent commuter trains two Russian cities with subways. The city is served by the Semyazino Airport 5 km west of the city center.

=== Gallery ===
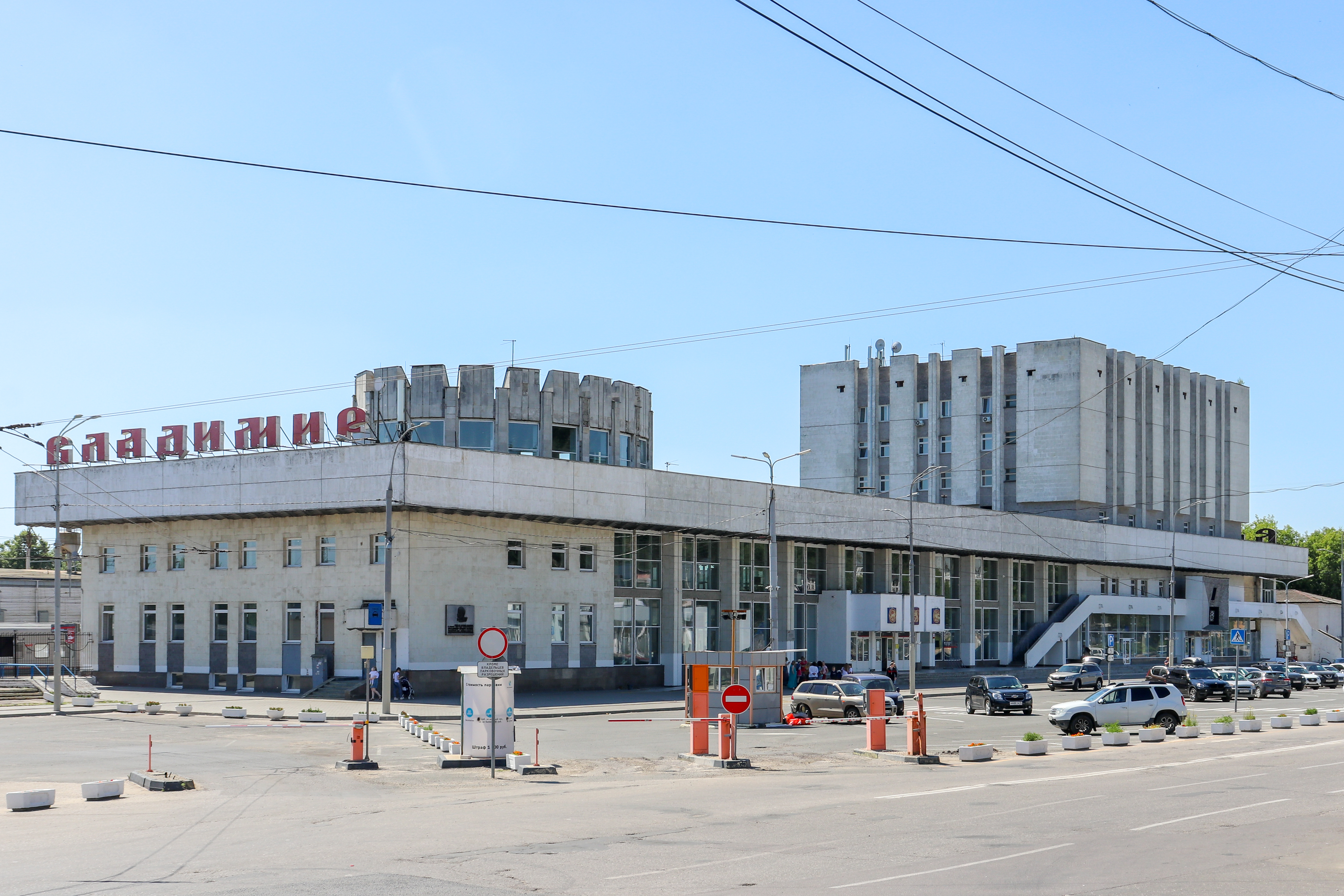
Vladimir railway station, June 2021

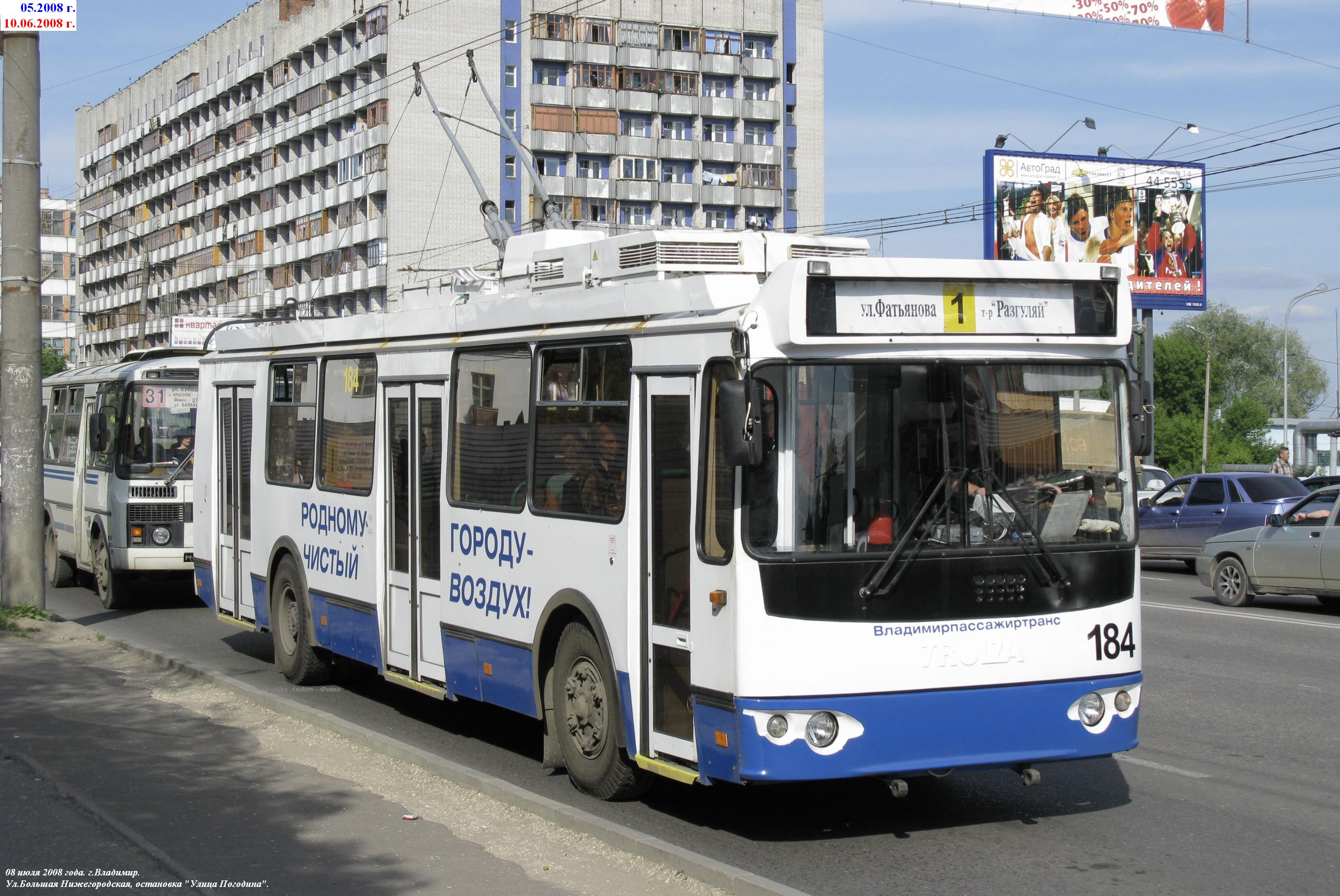
Trolleybus ZiU-9

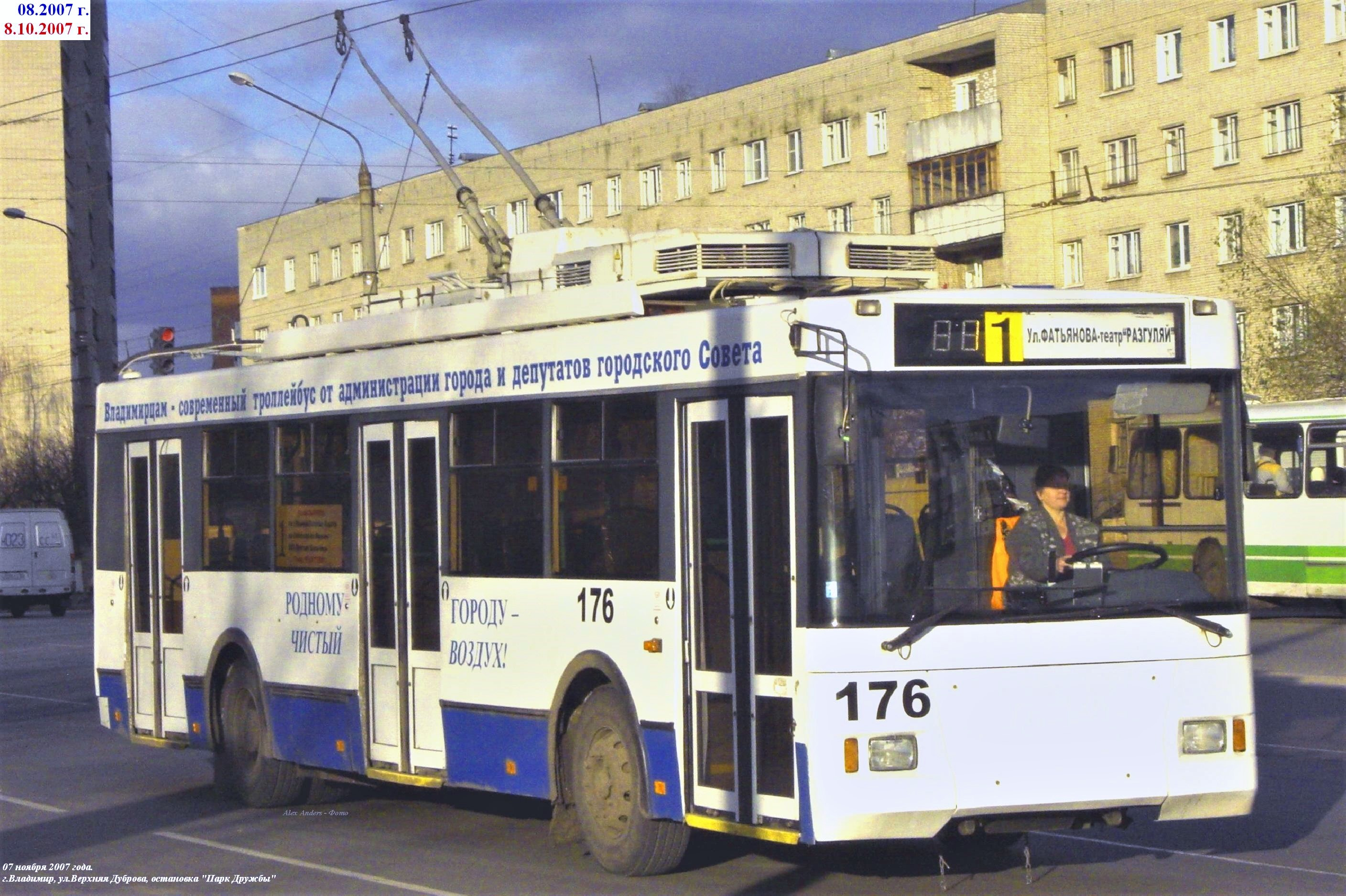
Trolza-5275 low-entry trolleybus

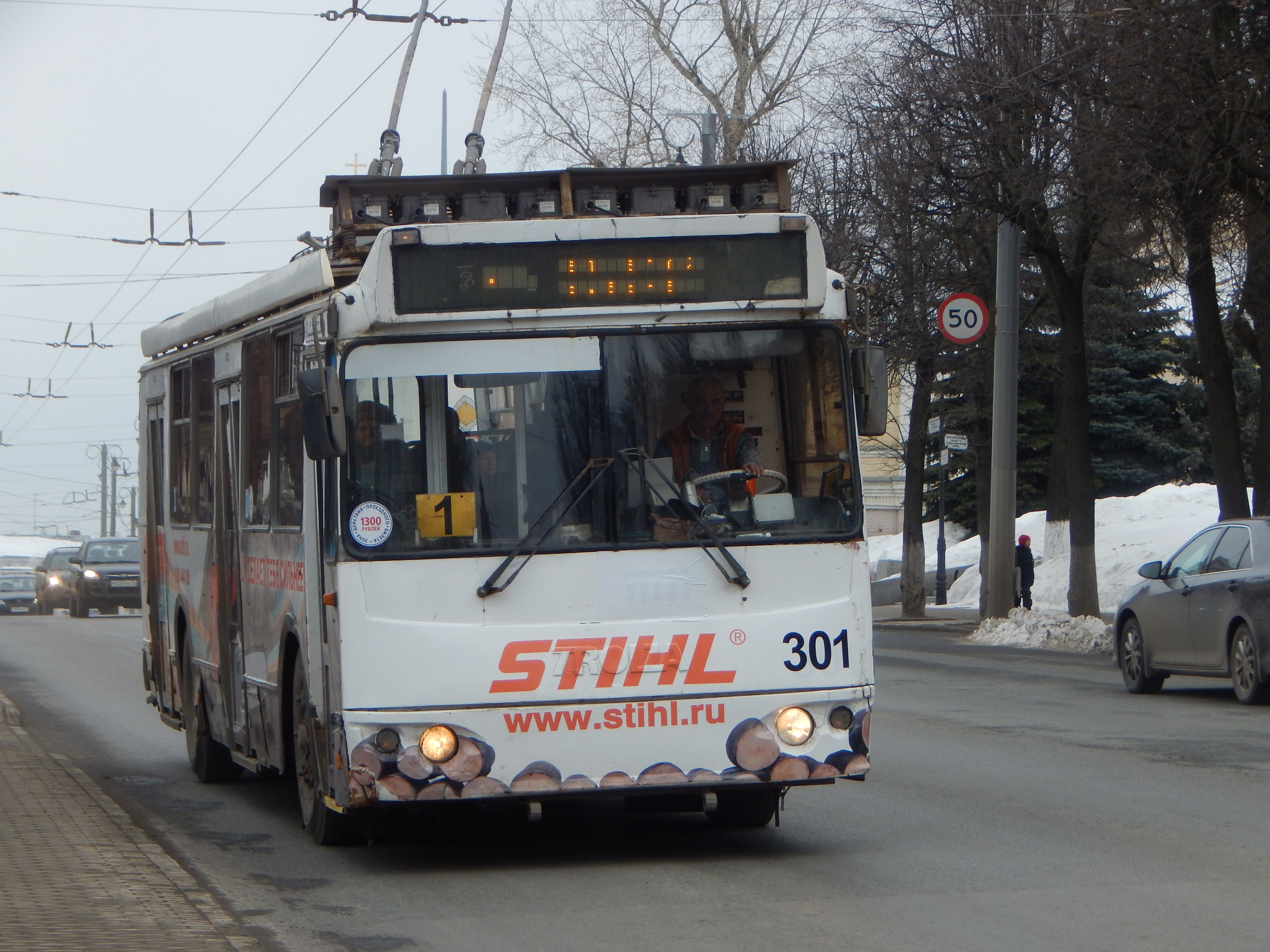
A trolleybus route #1

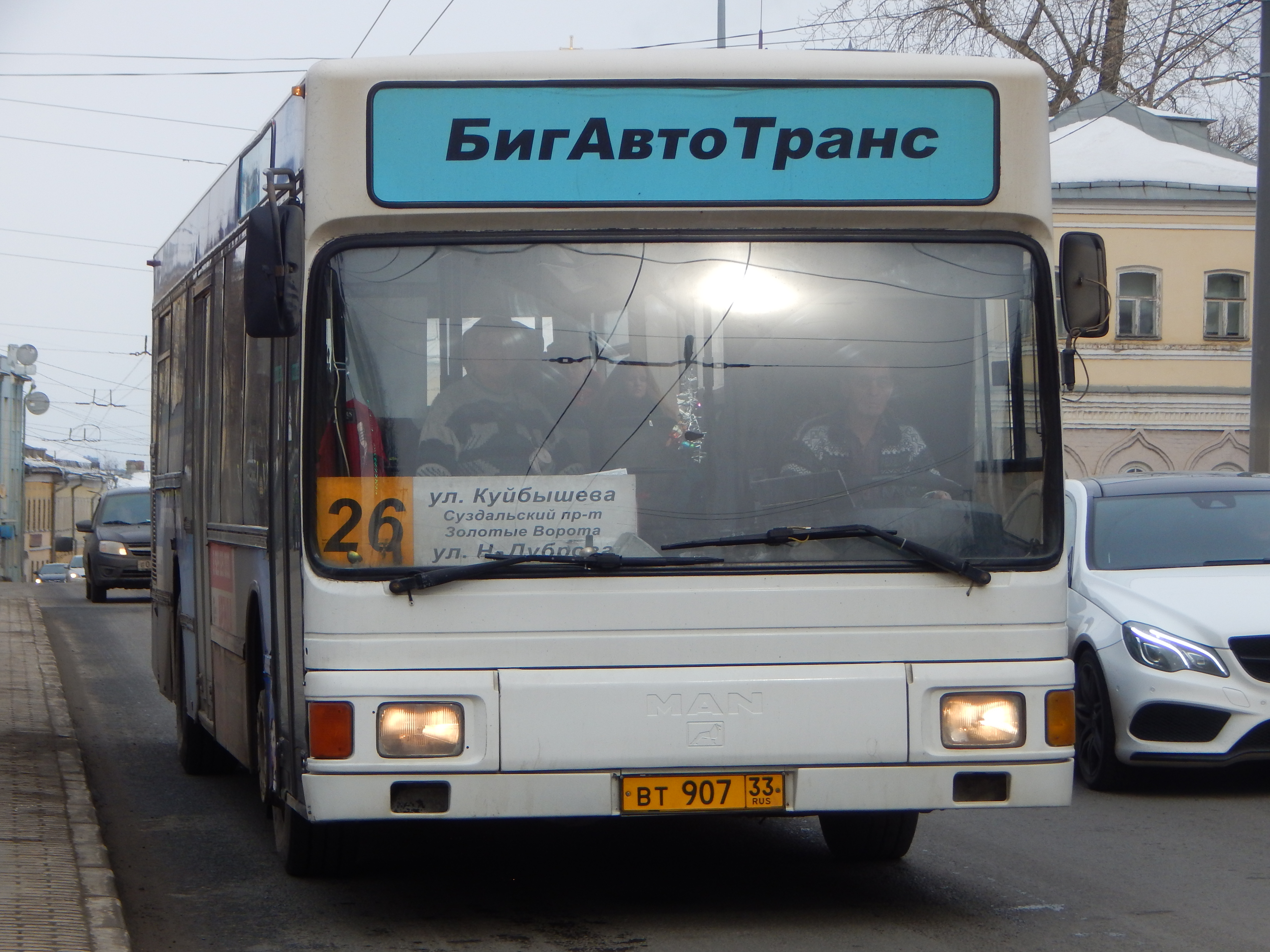
A bus route #26

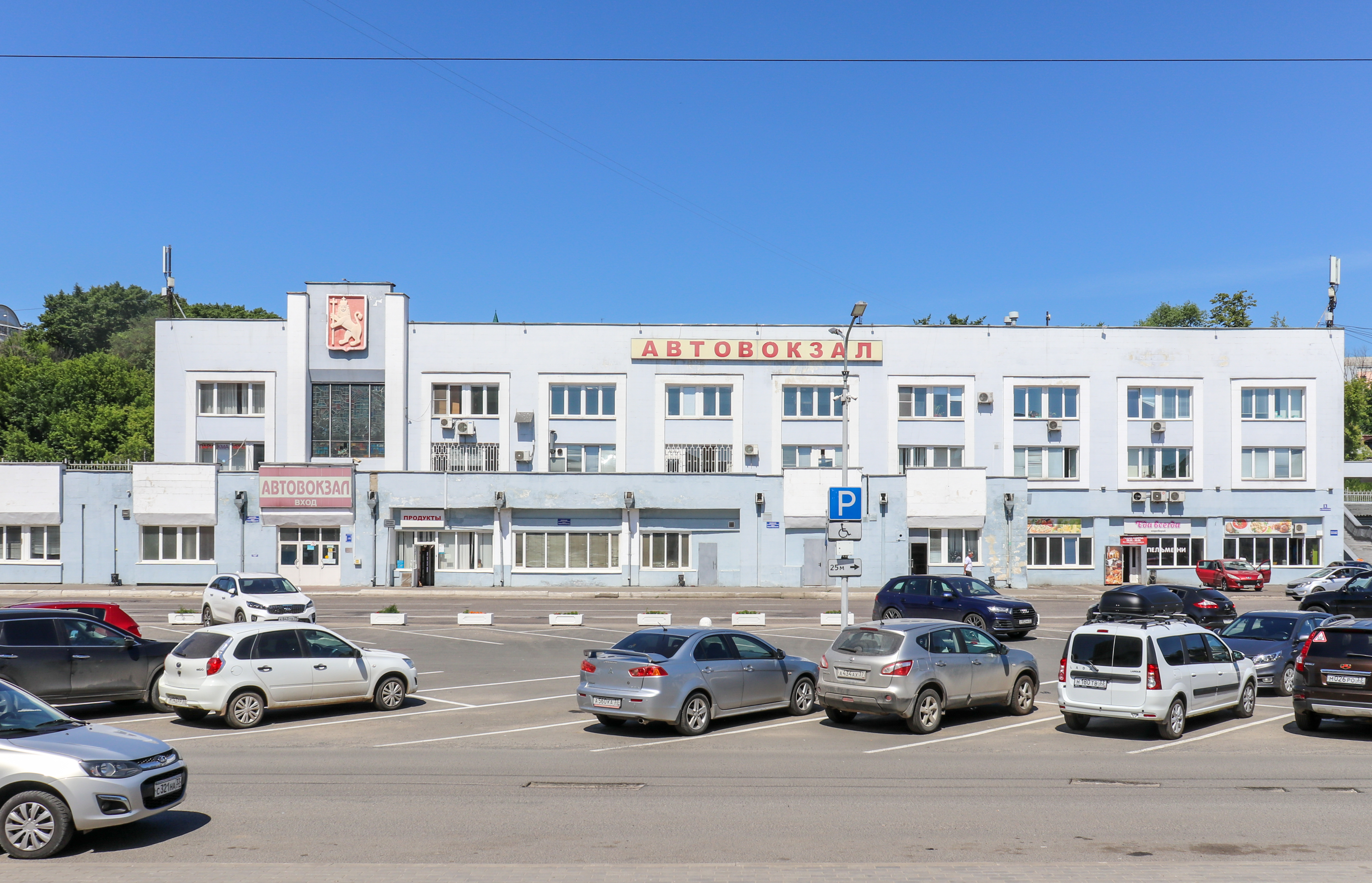
The bus terminal in Vladimir

== Population ==
Population: 349,951 (2021 census); 345,373 (2010 census); 315,954 (2002 census); 349,702 (1989 Soviet census).

== Climate ==
Vladimir experiences a humid continental climate (Köppen climate classification Dfb) with long, cold winters and short, warm summers.

Climate data for Vladimir (1991–2020, extremes 1902–present)
Month	Jan	Feb	Mar	Apr	May	Jun	Jul	Aug	Sep	Oct	Nov	Dec	Year
Record high °C (°F)	7.1 (44.8)	9.5 (49.1)	17.8 (64.0)	27.8 (82.0)	34.0 (93.2)	35.2 (95.4)	37.1 (98.8)	36.5 (97.7)	29.5 (85.1)	25.0 (77.0)	17.8 (64.0)	9.2 (48.6)	37.1 (98.8)
Mean daily maximum °C (°F)	−5.5 (22.1)	−4.4 (24.1)	1.8 (35.2)	11.1 (52.0)	19.1 (66.4)	22.2 (72.0)	24.6 (76.3)	22.6 (72.7)	16.3 (61.3)	8.2 (46.8)	0.3 (32.5)	−3.8 (25.2)	9.4 (48.9)
Daily mean °C (°F)	−8.3 (17.1)	−7.7 (18.1)	−2.3 (27.9)	5.8 (42.4)	13.0 (55.4)	16.6 (61.9)	19.0 (66.2)	16.9 (62.4)	11.4 (52.5)	4.9 (40.8)	−1.9 (28.6)	−6.1 (21.0)	5.1 (41.2)
Mean daily minimum °C (°F)	−10.9 (12.4)	−10.6 (12.9)	−5.6 (21.9)	1.4 (34.5)	7.7 (45.9)	11.7 (53.1)	14.1 (57.4)	12.3 (54.1)	7.7 (45.9)	2.4 (36.3)	−3.8 (25.2)	−8.4 (16.9)	1.5 (34.7)
Record low °C (°F)	−39.7 (−39.5)	−36.1 (−33.0)	−30.0 (−22.0)	−16.1 (3.0)	−8.0 (17.6)	−0.1 (31.8)	3.9 (39.0)	0.0 (32.0)	−6.3 (20.7)	−18.9 (−2.0)	−27.2 (−17.0)	−43.0 (−45.4)	−43.0 (−45.4)
Average precipitation mm (inches)	40 (1.6)	33 (1.3)	29 (1.1)	36 (1.4)	46 (1.8)	71 (2.8)	65 (2.6)	54 (2.1)	50 (2.0)	55 (2.2)	45 (1.8)	39 (1.5)	563 (22.2)
Average extreme snow depth cm (inches)	28 (11)	41 (16)	35 (14)	5 (2.0)	0 (0)	0 (0)	0 (0)	0 (0)	0 (0)	0 (0)	6 (2.4)	17 (6.7)	41 (16)
Average rainy days	5	3	6	12	15	17	15	15	16	16	10	5	135
Average snowy days	26	23	16	6	1	0	0	0	1	6	18	25	122
Average relative humidity (%)	86	82	76	71	67	73	76	79	82	85	88	87	79
Source: Pogoda.ru.net

== Sightseeing ==
Modern-day Vladimir is a part of the Golden Ring of ancient Russian cities and a popular tourist destination. Its three chief monuments, White Monuments of Vladimir and Suzdal, inscribed by UNESCO on the World Heritage List, are the following:

1. The magnificent five-domed Dormition Cathedral was designed as the burial place of grand princes and dedicated to the holy icon the Theotokos of Vladimir, which had been brought to the city by Andrey Bogolyubsky. The cathedral was constructed in 1158–1160, expanded in 1185–1189, and painted by the great Andrei Rublev and Daniil Chyorny in 1408. In 1810, a lofty bell-tower was added in Neoclassical style.
2. The helmet-domed Cathedral of Saint Demetrius was built in 1194–1197 as a private chapel of Vsevolod the Big Nest in the courtyard of his palace and was consecrated to his holy patron, St. Demetrius. For all its formal unity, the cathedral represents an international project of Russian and Byzantine masters, Friedrich Barbarossa's masons, and carvers sent by Queen Tamar of Georgia.
3. The Golden Gate, originally a tower over the city's main gate, was built in 1158–1164. The gate acquired its present form after having been reconstructed in the late 18th century, to prevent the dilapidated structure from tumbling down.

Other remarkable monuments of pre-Mongol Russian architecture are scattered in the vicinity. For more information on them, see Suzdal, Yuriev-Polsky, Bogolyubovo, and Kideksha.

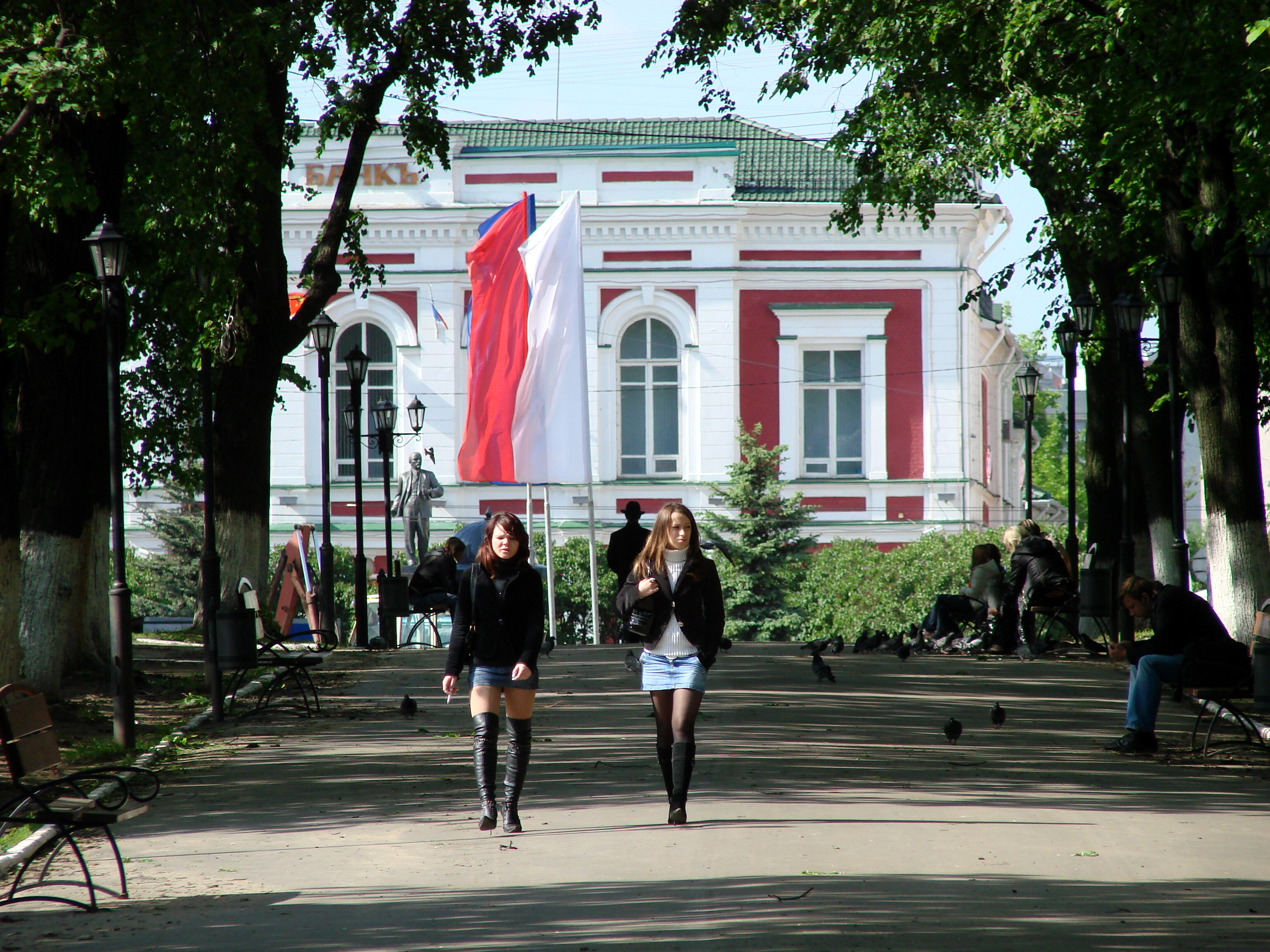
Public park in Vladimir

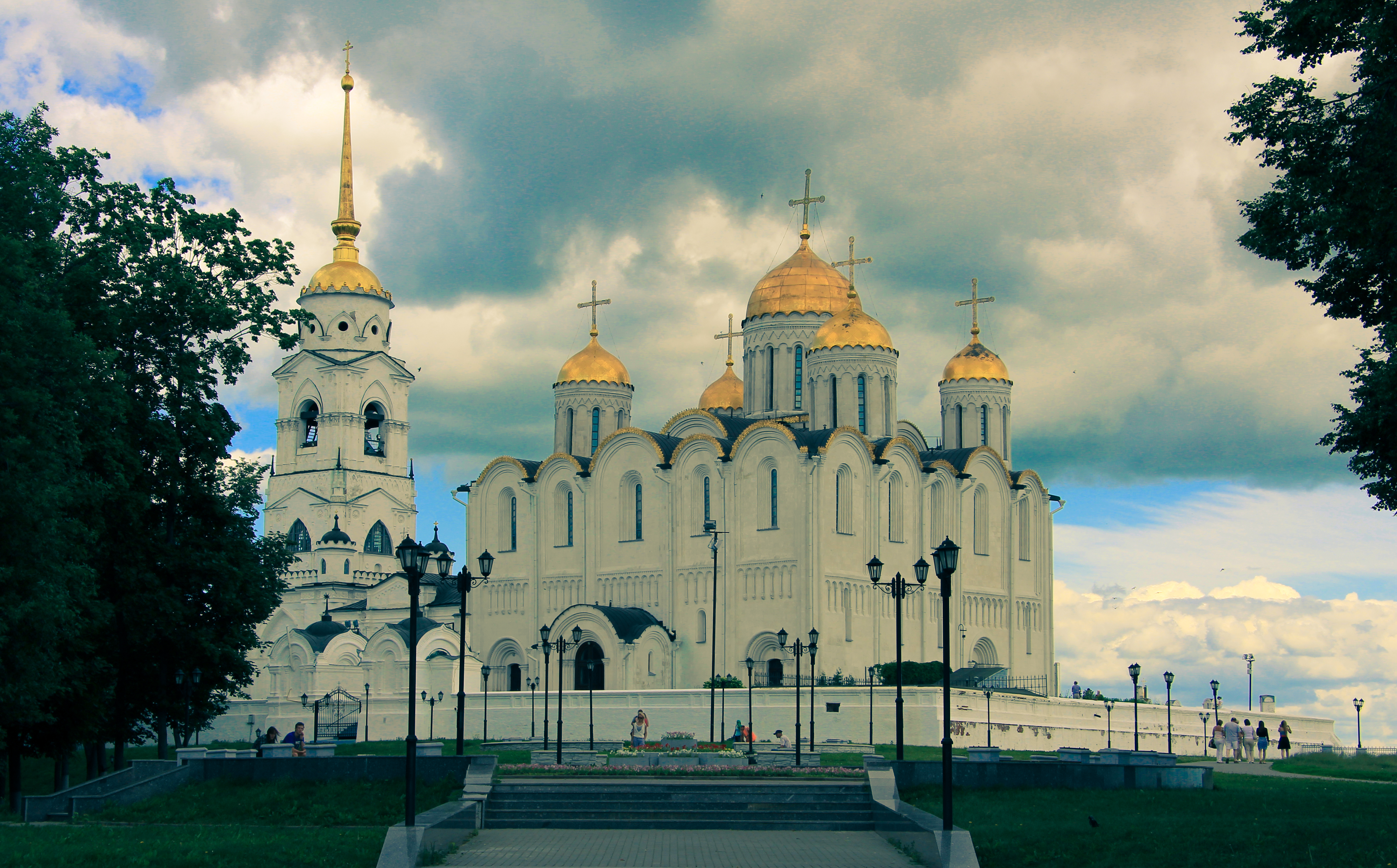
Assumption Cathedral

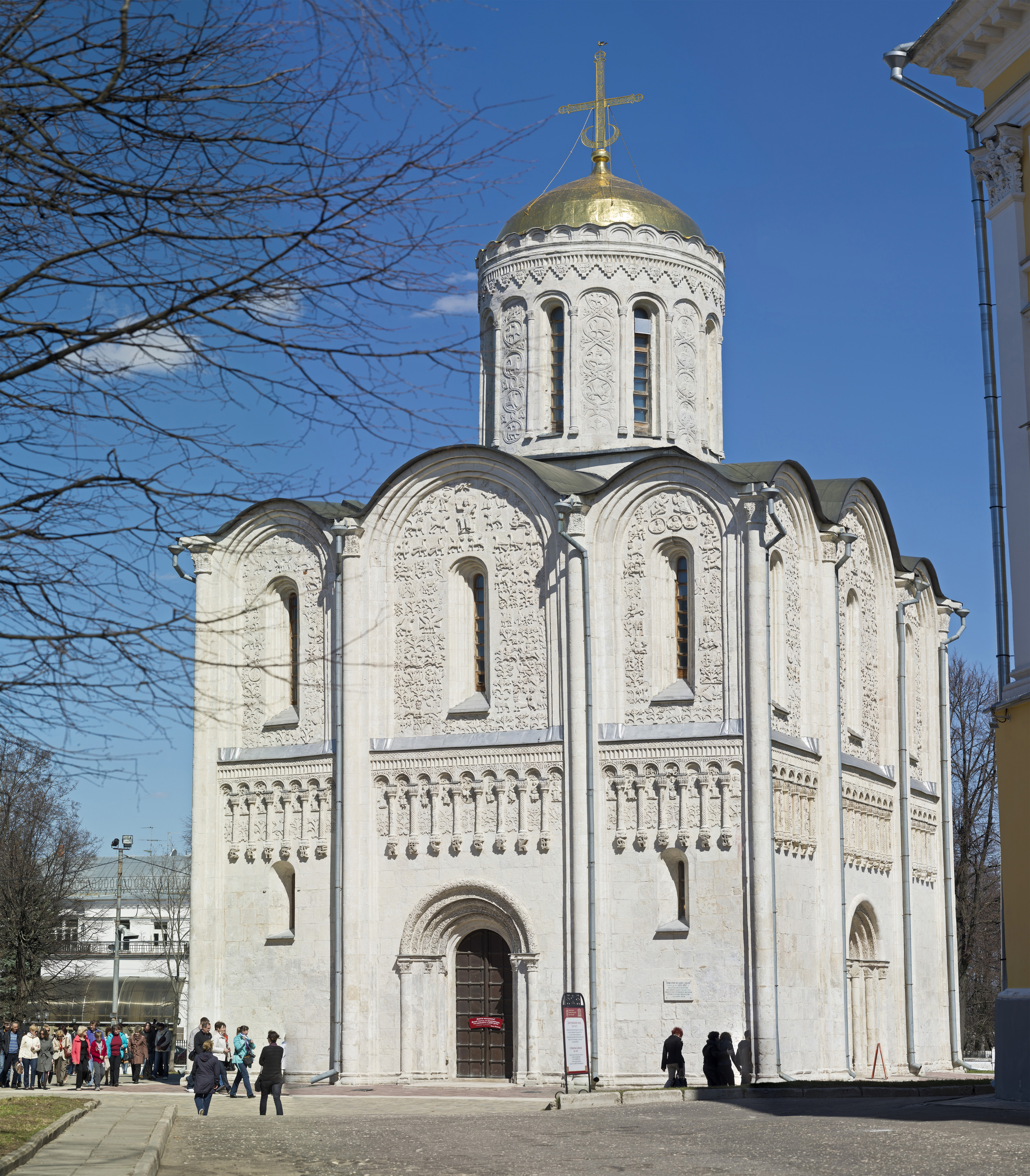
Cathedral of Saint Demetrius

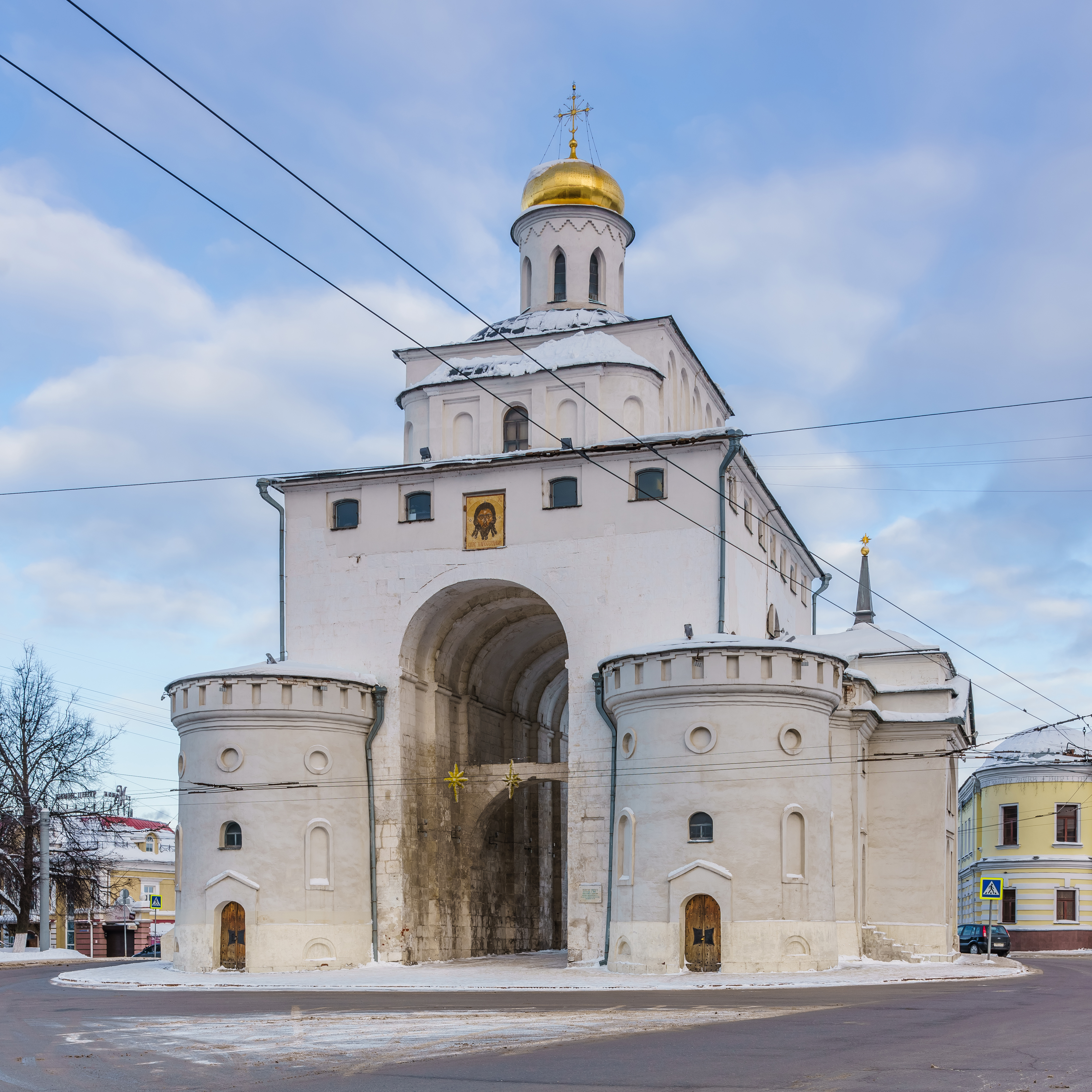
Golden Gate

== Education ==
Vladimir is the site of the following education establishments:

- Vladimir State University
- Vladimir branch of the Russian Academy of National Economy and Public Administration
- Vladimir branch of Financial University under the Government of the Russian Federation
- Vladimir branch of the Russian University of Cooperation
- Vladimir Law Institute under the Ministry of Justice
- Vladimir Business Institute
- Vladimir Aviation Mechanics College
- Vladimir Pedagogical College
- Vladimir Polytechnic College
- Vladimir Basic Medical College
- Vladimir Construction College
- Vladimir Regional College of Music
- Vladimir Economy and Technology College
- Vladimir College of Technology
- Vladimir Industrial College
- Vladimir Chemical and Mechanical College
- College of Innovative Technologies and Entrepreneurship at Vladimir State University

Vladimir is also home to the Federal Centre for Animal Health and Welfare.

== Sports ==
The city association football team, FC Torpedo Vladimir, currently plays in the second tier of Russian football having entered the league after seventeen years of competing in Russian third and fourth tiers.

Vladimir VC (previously known as Skat and Dinamo Vladimir) represents the city in Volleyball Major League B – Zone Europe. Vladimir is also home to Polaris-Vladimir ice hockey club, which competes in regional hockey competitions and Russian minor leagues, and Luch, which has both male and female table-tennis teams.

== Twin towns – sister cities ==
Vladimir is twinned with:

- Anghiari, Italy
- Antalya, Turkey
- Babruysk, Belarus
- Baoji, China
- Bloomington, United States
- Bukhara, Uzbekistan
- Campobasso, Italy
- Canterbury, United Kingdom
- Chongqing, China
- Erlangen, Germany
- (Georgia (country)) Gagra, Georgia
- Haikou, China
- Kardzhali, Bulgaria
- Karlovo, Bulgaria
- Kerava, Finland
- Khujand, Tajikistan
- Leninsky (Minsk), Belarus
- Normal, United States
- Saintes, France
- Sarasota, United States
- Skive, Denmark
- Vawkavysk, Belarus

Former twin towns, terminated in 2022 due to the Russian invasion of Ukraine

- Jelenia Góra, Poland
- Ústí nad Labem, Czech Republic

== Notable people ==
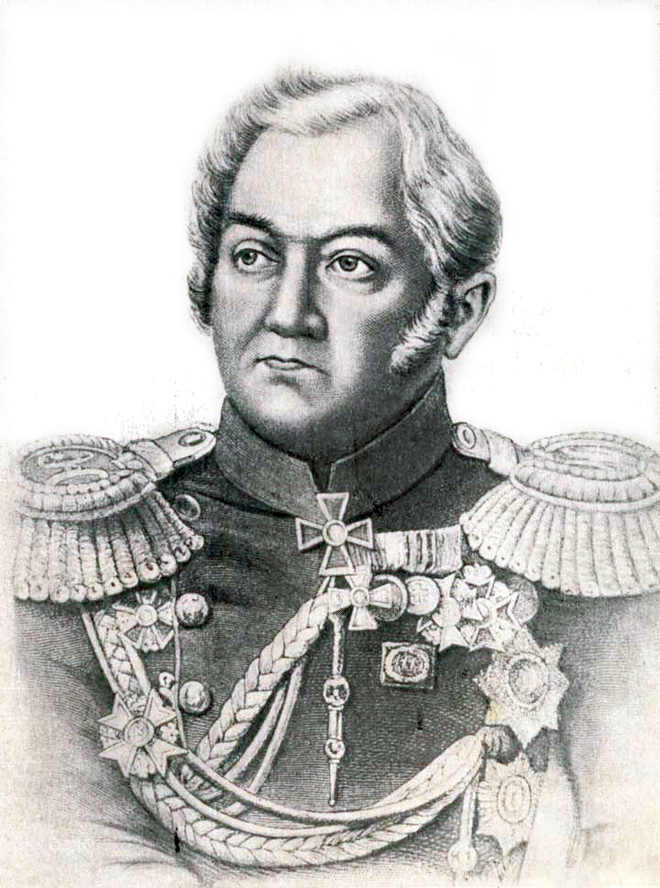
Mikhail Lazarev, 19th-century fleet commander and maritime explorer

- Valentin Afonin (1939–2021), association football player
- Yuri Lodigin (born 1990), association football player
- Nikolai Andrianov (1952–2011), gymnast
- Vladimir Artemov (born 1964), gymnast
- Aleksey Batalov (1928–2017), actor
- Mikhail Lazarev (1788–1851), admiral
- Yuri Levitan (1914–1983), radio announcer
- Anna Loginova (1978–2008), fashion model
- Alexey Prokurorov (1964–2008), cross-country skier
- Yuri Ryazanov (1987–2009), gymnast
- Vasily Shulgin (1878–1976), politician
- Mikhail Speransky (1772–1839), statesman
- Aleksandr Stoletov (1839–1896) , physicist
- Nikolai Stoletov (1834–1912), general
- Sergei Taneyev (1856–1915), composer
- Dmitri Vyazmikin (born 1972), association football player
- Venedikt Yerofeyev (1938–1990), writer
- Denis Yevsikov (born 1981), association football player
- Nikolay Zhukovsky (1847–1921), scientist
