= Knyaginino =

Knyaginino (Russian: Княгинино) is the name of several inhabited localities in Russia.

== Urban localities ==
- Knyaginino, Nizhny Novgorod Oblast, a town in Knyagininsky District of Nizhny Novgorod Oblast; administratively incorporated as a town of district significance

== Rural localities ==
- Knyaginino, Rognedinsky District, Bryansk Oblast, a village in Selilovichsky Selsoviet of Rognedinsky District of Bryansk Oblast
- Knyaginino, Sevsky District, Bryansk Oblast, a selo in Knyagininsky Selsoviet of Sevsky District of Bryansk Oblast
- Knyaginino, Kostroma Oblast, a village in Tsentralnoye Settlement of Buysky District of Kostroma Oblast
- Knyaginino, Moscow Oblast, a village in Petrovskoye Rural Settlement of Klinsky District of Moscow Oblast
- Knyaginino, Novomoskovsky District, Tula Oblast, a village in Ivan-Ozersky Rural Okrug of Novomoskovsky District of Tula Oblast
- Knyaginino, Odoyevsky District, Tula Oblast, a village in Botvinyevskaya Rural Administration of Odoyevsky District of Tula Oblast
- Knyaginino, Vladimir Oblast, a village in Kovrovsky District of Vladimir Oblast
- Knyaginino, Velikoustyugsky District, Vologda Oblast, a village in Yudinsky Selsoviet of Velikoustyugsky District of Vologda Oblast
- Knyaginino, Podlesny Selsoviet, Vologodsky District, Vologda Oblast, a village in Podlesny Selsoviet of Vologodsky District of Vologda Oblast
- Knyaginino, Raboche-Krestyansky Selsoviet, Vologodsky District, Vologda Oblast, a village in Raboche-Krestyansky Selsoviet of Vologodsky District of Vologda Oblast
- Knyaginino, Breytovsky District, Yaroslavl Oblast, a village in Pokrovo-Sitsky Rural Okrug of Breytovsky District of Yaroslavl Oblast
- Knyaginino, Poshekhonsky District, Yaroslavl Oblast, a village in Krasnovsky Rural Okrug of Poshekhonsky District of Yaroslavl Oblast
