= Sergei Skvortsov =

- Born: 11 March 2009 (age 17) Semyonov, Nizhny Novgorod Oblast, Russia
- Height: 6 ft 0 in (183 cm)
- Weight: 163 lb (74 kg; 11 st 9 lb)
- Position: Left wing
- Shoots: Right
- KHL team: Torpedo Nizhny Novgorod
- NHL draft: Eligible 2027
- Playing career: 2026–present

Sergei Andreyevich Skvortsov (Russian: Серге́й Андре́евич Скворцо́в; born 11 March 2009) is a Russian ice hockey left winger for Torpedo Nizhny Novgorod of the Kontinental Hockey League. He is considered a top prospect eligible for the 2027 NHL entry draft.

== Playing career ==
Skvortsov joined the academy of the club Torpedo Nizhny Novgorod at age 10. In his first years, he "consistently" scored around 100 points per season with his age group teams. With his age group team in the 2022–23 season, he recorded 195 points, including 118 goals, in 62 games. Skvortsov moved up to the U16 team for the 2023–24 season, recording 40 goals and 65 points in 36 games. The following year, with the U18 team, he posted 24 goals and 52 points in 25 regular season games. He then scored 14 points in 10 playoff games and led his team to the league championship, despite competing against players born in 2007 and earlier.

Skvortsov moved up to the Junior Hockey League (MHL) with Chaika Nizhny Novgorod for the 2025–26 season at age 16, becoming one of his team's leading scorers. He scored seven points in the first 10 games and finished the regular season with 43 points in 52 games. In the play-in round, he posted six points in two games, including four goals in one game, and in the playoffs, he had a hat-trick against Loko Yaroslavl. Skvortsov finished with 18 points in 17 postseason games and helped Chaika to a third-place finish. Overall, he was his team's number one scorer and posted a plus–minus rating of +21, while also being the third-youngest player to have a hat-trick in the history of the MHL playoffs.

Skvortsov signed a three-year professional contract with Torpedo Nizhny Novgorod in May 2026. In September 2026, he made his Kontinental Hockey League (KHL) debut against HC Spartak Moscow and scored a goal in his debut. At age 17 years, 178 days, he became the second-youngest KHL goalscorer in the history of Torpedo Nizhny Novgorod, 20 days older than record-holder Anton Silayev. Skvortsov also became the first player born in 2009 to debut in the KHL.

Skvortsov is regarded as a top prospect for the 2027 NHL entry draft. He has received comparisons to the NHL's all-time leading goalscorer Alexander Ovechkin. Sovetsky Sport described Skvortsov and Nazar Privalov as the "successors to Ovechkin and [Evgeni] Malkin", respectively.

== International carer ==
During the 2024–25 season, Skvortsov made nine appearances for the Russian national under-16 team, scoring six goals and six assists in nine games. In November 2025, he was called up to the national under-18 team for the Future Cup tournament, competing against players born as early as 2006.

== Personal life ==
Skvortsov was born on 11 March 2009 in Semyonov, Nizhny Novgorod Oblast, Russia. His father played hockey at the amateur level. His brother, Alexander, was a European champion in Muay Thai. Skvortsov has trained in Muay Thai with his brother. He said he received his introduction to hockey at age four, when his mother took him to a practice while his father was at work, without telling his father. "By the time Dad got home, I was already a hockey player," he said. His father later helped train him in hockey.
