= Golden Gate, Vladimir =

Preserved ancient Russian city gate

Coordinates: 56°07′36″N 40°23′49″E

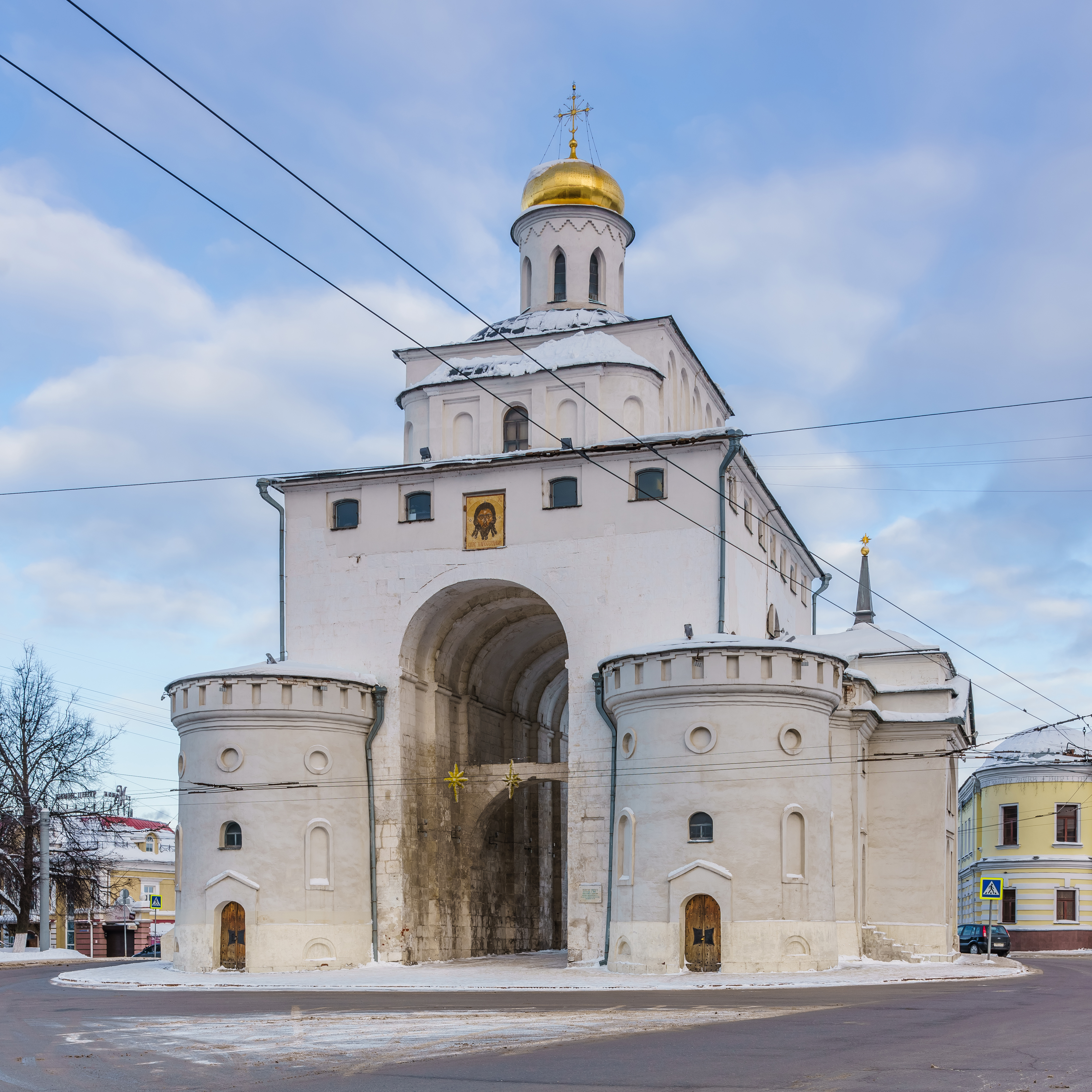
Golden Gate in Vladimir was erected by 1164 and reconstructed in 1795 due to a fire that burned down the city.

The Golden Gate of Vladimir (Russian: Золотые ворота, romanized: Zolotye Vorota), constructed between 1158 and 1164, is the only (albeit partially) preserved ancient Russian city gate. A museum inside focuses on the history of the Mongol invasion of Russia in the 13th century.

The gate survived the Mongol destruction of Vladimir in 1237. By the late 18th century, however, the structure had so deteriorated that Catherine the Great was afraid to pass through the arch for fear of its tumbling down. In 1779, she ordered detailed measurements and drawings of the monument to be executed. In 1795, after many discussions, the vaults and barbican church were demolished.

The site became a UNESCO World Heritage site in 1992.
