= Vladimir branch of the Russian Academy of National Economy and Public Administration =

Vladimir Branch of The Russian Presidential Academy of National Economy and Public Administration
- Former names: Academy of National Economy, Russian Academy of Public Administration
- Type: Public
- Established: 1995 (reorganized in 2010)
- Rector: Vladimir Aleksandrovich Mau
- Director: Vyacheslav Yuryevich Kartukhin
- Students: 2596
- Location: Vladimir, Russia
- Nickname: Vladimir Branch of the RANEPA
- Website: vlad.ranepa.ru

Vladimir branch of the Russian Presidential Academy of National Economy and Public Administration or Vladimir branch of the RANEPA (Russian: Владимирский филиал Российской академии народного хозяйства и государственной службы при Президенте Российской Федерации), is one out of 64 branches of the federal state-funded institution of higher professional learning - the Russian Presidential Academy of National Economy and Public Administration.

== History ==
Vladimir branch of the Russian Academy of Public Administration (RAPA) was founded by order of the President of the Russian Academy of Public Administration (RAPA) on June, 9 in 1995. The RANEPA was founded as a result of merger of the Academy of National Economy (ANE) which was established in 1977, the Russian Academy of Public Administration (RAPA), and 12 federal state educational institutions. The RANEPA was founded by presidential order on September 20, 2010. With the foundation of the RANEPA in 2010 Vladimir branch of the RAPA became Vladimir branch of the Russian Academy of National Economy and Public Administration under the President of the Russian Federation.

== Academic programs ==
Vladimir branch of the Presidential Academy offers bachelor’s, specialist’s, master’s and PhD programs. Vladimir branch of the RANEPA trains managers, human resources managers, specialists in state and municipal administration, economists, lawyers as well as specialists in economic security and national safety.

== Curriculum ==
The Academy curriculum is both theory- and practice-oriented. The curriculum consists of three major groups of courses. The first group of subjects are the humanities, social and economic sciences. They are Philosophy, History, Sociology, Psychology, Study of Culture, Law, а foreign language, Political Science, Economic Theory, etc. The second group of subjects are mathematical and natural sciences. They are Mathematical Analysis, Algebra, Probability Theory, Statistics, Concepts of Modern Natural Science, Information Technologies, etc. The third group of courses are professionally oriented subjects: Microeconomics, Macroeconomics, Business Accounting, Marketing for future economists, Management, Law of Employment, Financial Management, Business Planning, Strategic Management for management students, Theory of State and Law, Civil Law, Criminal Law, Civil Procedure, Criminal Procedure, Financial Law, Tax Law for law students, etc.

== Academic year ==
The academic program takes four or five years to complete for full-time students and from three to six years for part-time students.

== Exams ==
Examinations are held at the end of each term. Final examinations are taken at the end of the course of studies.

== Extracurricular activities ==
Vladimir branch of the Russian Presidential Academy provides students with many opportunities to do sports.
