= Knyaginino, Vladimir Oblast =

Knyaginino Княгинино
- Village
- Location within Vladimir Oblast Location within Russia
- Coordinates: 56°10′N 41°18′E
- Country: Russia
- Region: Vladimir Oblast
- District: Kovrovsky District
- Time zone: UTC+3:00

Knyaginino (Russian: Княгинино) is a rural locality (a village) in Novoselskoye Rural Settlement, Kovrovsky District, Vladimir Oblast, Russia. The population was 13 as of 2010.

== Geography ==
Knyaginino is located 24 km south of Kovrov (the district's administrative centre) by road. Maryino is the nearest rural locality.
