= Knyaginino, Podlesny Selsoviet, Vologodsky District, Vologda Oblast =

Knyaginino Княгинино
- Village
- Location within Vologda Oblast Location within Russia
- Coordinates: 59°07′N 40°06′E
- Country: Russia
- Region: Vologda Oblast
- District: Vologodsky District
- Time zone: UTC+3:00

Knyaginino (Russian: Княгинино) is a rural locality (a village) in Podlesnoye Rural Settlement, Vologodsky District, Vologda Oblast, Russia. The population was 340 as of 2002.

== Geography ==
Knyaginino is located 19 km southeast of Vologda (the district's administrative centre) by road. Koptsevo is the nearest rural locality.
