= Knyaginino, Sevsky District, Bryansk Oblast =

Knyaginino Княгинино
- Selo
- Location within Bryansk Oblast Location within Russia
- Coordinates: 52°12′N 34°25′E
- Country: Russia
- Region: Bryansk Oblast
- District: Sevsky District
- Time zone: UTC+3:00

Knyaginino (Russian: Княгинино) is a rural locality (a selo) in Sevsky District, Bryansk Oblast, Russia. The population was 464 as of 2010. There are 5 streets.

== Geography ==
Knyaginino is located 10 km north of Sevsk (the district's administrative centre) by road. Pokrovsky is the nearest rural locality.
