= Shuvalovo =

Shuvalovo Шувалово
- Settlement
- Location within Vladimir Oblast Location within Russia
- Coordinates: 56°07′N 38°40′E
- Country: Russia
- Region: Vladimir Oblast
- District: Kirzhachsky District
- Time zone: UTC+3:00

Shuvalovo (Russian: Шувалово) is a rural locality (a settlement) in Filippovskoye Rural Settlement, Kirzhachsky District, Vladimir Oblast, Russia. It belongs to a district in the western part of the oblast, which borders Moscow Oblast and contains 112 rural localities. The administrative centre of its rural settlement, Filippovskoye, has a history dating to the late 14th century, when it was granted to the Chudov Monastery by Prince Vasily Dmitrievich.

== Geography ==
Shuvalovo lies in Kirzhachsky District, a compact district in the western part of Vladimir Oblast that stretches 46 km from north to south and 44 km from west to east. It borders Moscow Oblast and covers 1,135 km², or 3.9 percent of the oblast's territory. The district is divided into six municipal entities: the district itself, the town of Kirzhach and the rural settlements of Gorkinskoye, Kiprevskoye, Pershinskoye and Filippovskoye, and it contains 112 rural localities.

As of 1 January 2025, the district had 37,873 residents, of whom 25,814 (68.2 percent) lived in urban areas and 12,159 (31.8 percent) in the countryside, a decrease of 77 from the previous year. According to the district administration, about 800 enterprises and organizations are registered there, including some 470 commercial firms, and the industrial complex is the basis of the district's budget revenues and employment.

The administrative center of the rural settlement to which Shuvalovo belongs, Filippovskoye, has been known since the late 14th century, when Moscow Prince Vasily Dmitrievich gave it to the Chudov Monastery. Archaeologists have found a settlement there dating from the 14th to 17th centuries.

In the early 18th century, the village became the property of Alexander Menshikov, the close associate of Peter the Great and governor of St. Petersburg. After Menshikov's fall from favor following Peter's death, it returned to the Chudov Monastery in 1727, which owned it until 1764, when it passed to the Collegium of Economy. By the middle of the 19th century, Filippovskoye had 65 households and 467 residents, a school, and fairs held four times a year, and its population later exceeded 1,000 people living in 148 households.
