= Yurtsovo =

Yurtsovo (Russian: Юрцово) is the name of several rural localities in Russia:

- Yurtsovo, Alexandrovsky District, Vladimir Oblast, a village in Karinskoye Rural Settlement of Alexandrovsky District in Vladimir Oblast
- Yurtsovo, Kirzhachsky District, Vladimir Oblast, a village in Gorkinskoye Rural Settlement of Kirzhachsky District in Vladimir Oblast
