= Kirzhach (disambiguation) =

Kirzhach is a town in Vladimir Oblast, Russia.

Kirzhach may also refer to:

- Kirzhach Urban Settlement, a municipal formation which the town of Kirzhach in Kirzhachsky District of Vladimir Oblast, Russia is incorporated as
- Kirzhach (inhabited locality), several inhabited localities in Russia
- Kirzhach (river), a river in Vladimir Oblast, Russia
