= Filippovsky =

Filippovsky (Russian: Филипповский; masculine), Filippovskaya (Филипповская; feminine), or Filippovskoye (Филипповское; neuter) is the name of several rural localities in Russia:

- Filippovsky, Altai Krai, a settlement in Filippovsky Selsoviet of Kamensky District of Altai Krai
- Filippovsky, Bolkhovsky District, Oryol Oblast, a settlement in Novosinetsky Selsoviet of Bolkhovsky District of Oryol Oblast
- Filippovsky, Mtsensky District, Oryol Oblast, a settlement in Karandakovsky Selsoviet of Mtsensky District of Oryol Oblast
- Filippovsky, Rostov Oblast, a khutor in Mankovskoye Rural Settlement of Chertkovsky District of Rostov Oblast
- Filippovskoye, Kostroma Oblast, a village in Sudayskoye Settlement of Chukhlomsky District of Kostroma Oblast
- Filippovskoye, Chekhovsky District, Moscow Oblast, a village in Stremilovskoye Rural Settlement of Chekhovsky District of Moscow Oblast
- Filippovskoye, Sergiyevo-Posadsky District, Moscow Oblast, a village in Shemetovskoye Rural Settlement of Sergiyevo-Posadsky District of Moscow Oblast
- Filippovskoye, Nizhny Novgorod Oblast, a village in Kantaurovsky Selsoviet of Bor, Nizhny Novgorod Oblast|Bor, Nizhny Novgorod Oblast
- Filippovskoye, Vladimir Oblast, a selo in Kirzhachsky District of Vladimir Oblast
- Filippovskoye, Danilovsky District, Yaroslavl Oblast, a village in Fedurinsky Rural Okrug of Danilovsky District of Yaroslavl Oblast
- Filippovskoye, Pereslavsky District, Yaroslavl Oblast, a selo in Dubrovitsky Rural Okrug of Pereslavsky District of Yaroslavl Oblast
- Filippovskaya, Kargopolsky District, Arkhangelsk Oblast, a village in Krechetovsky Selsoviet of Kargopolsky District of Arkhangelsk Oblast
- Filippovskaya, Krasnoborsky District, Arkhangelsk Oblast, a village in Cherevkovsky Selsoviet of Krasnoborsky District of Arkhangelsk Oblast
- Filippovskaya, Nyandomsky District, Arkhangelsk Oblast, a village in Moshinsky Selsoviet of Nyandomsky District of Arkhangelsk Oblast
- Filippovskaya, Plesetsky District, Arkhangelsk Oblast, a village in Pochezersky Selsoviet of Plesetsky District of Arkhangelsk Oblast
- Filippovskaya, Shenkursky District, Arkhangelsk Oblast, a village in Rovdinsky Selsoviet of Shenkursky District of Arkhangelsk Oblast
- Filippovskaya, Vinogradovsky District, Arkhangelsk Oblast, a village in Konetsgorsky Selsoviet of Vinogradovsky District of Arkhangelsk Oblast
