= Klimkovo =

Klimkovo (Russian: Климково) is the name of several rural localities in Russia:

- Klimkovo, Malovishersky District, Novgorod Oblast, a village in Burginskoye Settlement of Malovishersky District of Novgorod Oblast
- Klimkovo, Moshenskoy District, Novgorod Oblast, a village in Orekhovskoye Settlement of Moshenskoy District of Novgorod Oblast
- Klimkovo, Vladimir Oblast, a village in Kirzhachsky District of Vladimir Oblast
- Klimkovo, Vologda Oblast, a village in Ploskovsky Selsoviet of Gryazovetsky District of Vologda Oblast
