= Ilkino, Kirzhachsky District, Vladimir Oblast =

Ilkino Илькино
- Village
- Location within Vladimir Oblast Location within Russia
- Coordinates: 56°13′N 38°50′E
- Country: Russia
- Region: Vladimir Oblast
- District: Kirzhachsky District
- Time zone: UTC+3:00

Ilkino (Russian: Илькино) is a rural locality (a village) in Gorkinskoye Rural Settlement, Kirzhachsky District, Vladimir Oblast, Russia. The population was 308 as of 2010. There are 5 streets.

== Geography ==
Ilkino is located on the Kirzhach River, 9 km north of Kirzhach (the district's administrative centre) by road. Lisitsyno is the nearest rural locality.
