= Ileykino =

Ileykino Илейкино
- Village
- Location within Vladimir Oblast Location within Russia
- Coordinates: 56°04′N 38°51′E
- Country: Russia
- Region: Vladimir Oblast
- District: Kirzhachsky District
- Time zone: UTC+3:00

Ileykino (Russian: Илейкино) is a rural locality (a village) in Pershinskoye Rural Settlement, Kirzhachsky District, Vladimir Oblast, Russia. The population was 56 as of 2010. There are 8 streets.

== Geography ==
Ileykino is located on the Kirzhach River, 11 km south of Kirzhach (the district's administrative centre) by road. Dvorishchi is the nearest rural locality.
