= Yefanovo =

Yefanovo Ефаново
- Village
- Location within Vladimir Oblast Location within Russia
- Coordinates: 56°09′N 38°55′E
- Country: Russia
- Region: Vladimir Oblast
- District: Kirzhachsky District
- Time zone: UTC+3:00

Yefanovo (Russian: Ефаново) is a rural locality (a village) in Kiprevskoye Rural Settlement, Kirzhachsky District, Vladimir Oblast, Russia. The population was 29 as of 2010. There are 2 streets.

== Geography ==
Yefanovo is located on the Vakhchilka River, 5 km east of Kirzhach (the district's administrative centre) by road. Kirzhach is the nearest rural locality.
