= Krasny Gornyak =

Krasny Gornyak Красный Горняк
- Settlement
- Location within Vladimir Oblast Location within Russia
- Coordinates: 56°14′N 38°47′E
- Country: Russia
- Region: Vladimir Oblast
- District: Kirzhachsky District
- Time zone: UTC+3:00

Krasny Gornyak (Russian: Красный Горняк) is a rural locality (a settlement) in Gorkinskoye Rural Settlement, Kirzhachsky District, Vladimir Oblast, Russia. The population was 7 as of 2010. There are 6 streets.

== Geography ==
Krasny Gornyak is located 16 km north of Kirzhach (the district's administrative centre) by road. Gorka is the nearest rural locality.
