= Karpovshchina =

Karpovshchina Карповщина
- Village
- Location within Vladimir Oblast Location within Russia
- Coordinates: 56°01′N 38°49′E
- Country: Russia
- Region: Vladimir Oblast
- District: Kirzhachsky District
- Time zone: UTC+3:00

Karpovshchina (Russian: Карповщина) is a rural locality (a village) in Filippovskoye Rural Settlement, Kirzhachsky District, Vladimir Oblast, Russia. The population was 3 as of 2010. There is 1 street.

== Geography ==
Karpovshchina is located 30 km south of Kirzhach (the district's administrative centre) by road. Pesyane is the nearest rural locality.
