= Pesyane =

Pesyane Песьяне
- Village
- Location within Vladimir Oblast Location within Russia
- Coordinates: 56°01′N 38°48′E
- Country: Russia
- Region: Vladimir Oblast
- District: Kirzhachsky District
- Time zone: UTC+3:00

Pesyane (Russian: Песьяне) is a rural locality (a village) in Filippovskoye Rural Settlement, Kirzhachsky District, Vladimir Oblast, Russia. The population was 330 as of 2010. There are 12 streets.

== Geography ==
Pesyane is located 28 km south of Kirzhach (the district's administrative centre) by road. Karpovshchina is the nearest rural locality.
