= Alenino =

Alenino Аленино
- Village
- Location within Vladimir Oblast Location within Russia
- Coordinates: 56°06′N 38°37′E
- Country: Russia
- Region: Vladimir Oblast
- District: Kirzhachsky District
- Time zone: UTC+3:00

Alenino (Russian: Аленино) is a rural locality (a village) in Filippovskoye Rural Settlement, Kirzhachsky District, Vladimir Oblast, Russia. The population was 593 as of 2010. There are 39 streets.

== Geography ==
Alenino is located 21 km southwest of Kirzhach (the district's administrative centre) by road. Filippovskoye is the nearest rural locality.
