= Bardovo =

Bardovo Бардово
- Village
- Location within Vladimir Oblast Location within Russia
- Coordinates: 56°16′N 38°53′E
- Country: Russia
- Region: Vladimir Oblast
- District: Kirzhachsky District
- Time zone: UTC+3:00

Bardovo (Russian: Бардово) is a rural locality (a village) in Gorkinskoye Rural Settlement, Kirzhachsky District, Vladimir Oblast, Russia. The population was 3 as of 2010. There are 10 streets.

== Geography ==
Bardovo is located 20 km north of Kirzhach (the district's administrative centre) by road. Slobodka is the nearest rural locality.
