= Savino, Kirzhachsky District, Vladimir Oblast =

Savino Савино
- Village
- Location within Vladimir Oblast Location within Russia
- Coordinates: 56°14′N 38°53′E
- Country: Russia
- Region: Vladimir Oblast
- District: Kirzhachsky District
- Time zone: UTC+3:00

Savino (Russian: Савино) is a rural locality (a village) in Gorkinskoye Rural Settlement, Kirzhachsky District, Vladimir Oblast, Russia. The population was 123 as of 2010. There are 7 streets.

== Geography ==
Savino is located on the Kirzhach River, 13 km north of Kirzhach (the district's administrative centre) by road. Ivashevo is the nearest rural locality.
