= Smolnevo =

Smolnevo Смольнево
- Village
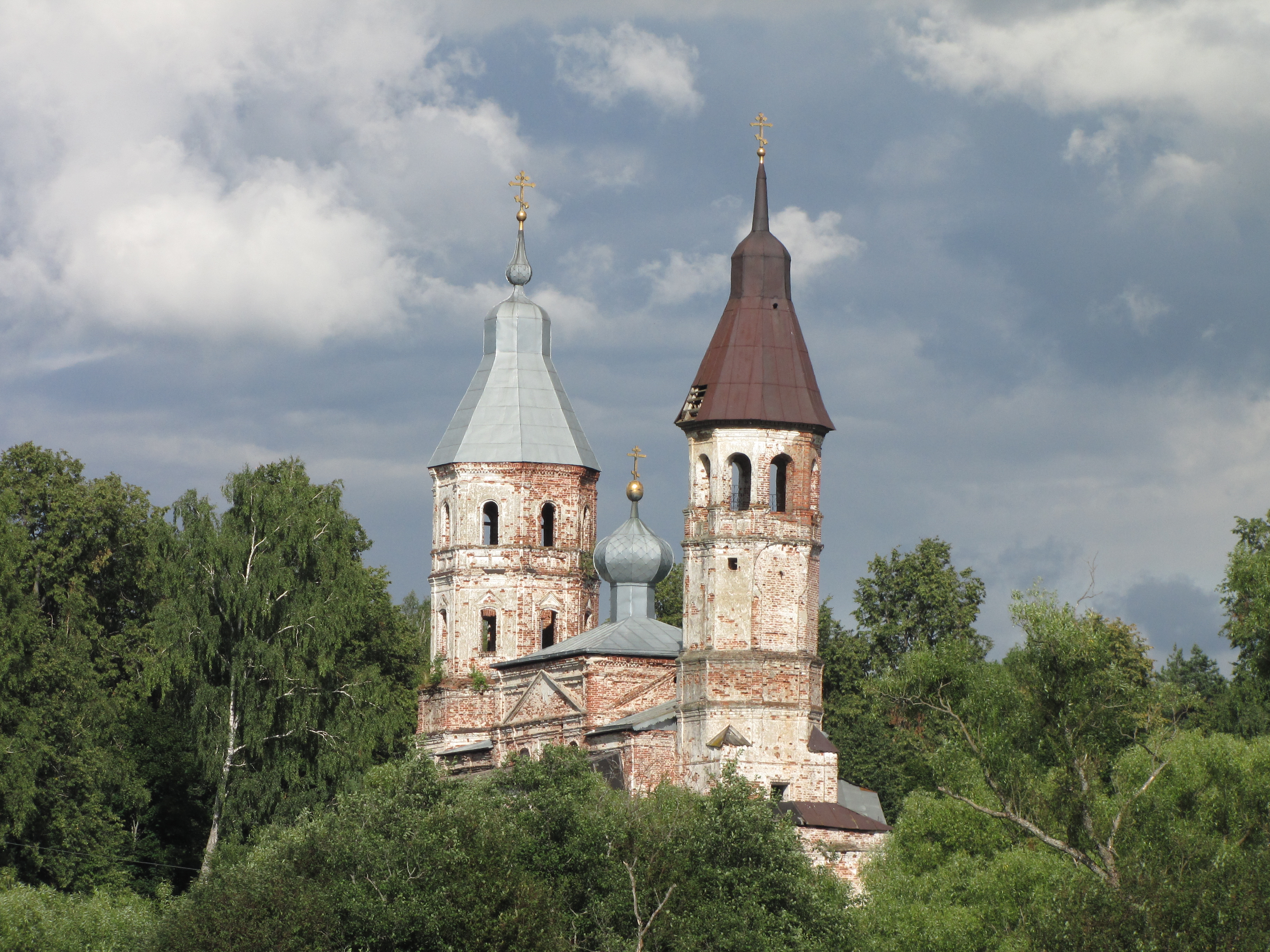
- A church In the Smolnevo village

- Location within Vladimir Oblast Location within Russia
- Coordinates: 56°16′N 38°58′E
- Country: Russia
- Region: Vladimir Oblast
- District: Kirzhachsky District
- Time zone: UTC+3:00

Smolnevo (Russian: Смольнево) is a rural locality (a village) in Kiprevskoye Rural Settlement, Kirzhachsky District, Vladimir Oblast, Russia. The population was 11 as of 2010. There are 3 streets.

== Geography ==
Smolnevo is located on the Bolshoy Kirzhach River, 17 km northeast of Kirzhach (the district's administrative centre) by road. Trutnevo is the nearest rural locality.
