= Arefino, Kirzhachsky District, Vladimir Oblast =

Arefino Арефино
- Village
- Location within Vladimir Oblast Location within Russia
- Coordinates: 56°11′N 38°59′E
- Country: Russia
- Region: Vladimir Oblast
- District: Kirzhachsky District
- Time zone: UTC+3:00

Arefino (Russian: Арефино) is a rural locality (a village) in Kiprevskoye Rural Settlement, Kirzhachsky District, Vladimir Oblast, Russia. The population was 18 as of 2010. There are 11 streets.

== Geography ==
Arefino is located on the Vakhchilka River, 8 km northeast of Kirzhach (the district's administrative centre) by road. Vlasyevo is the nearest rural locality.
