= Gribanovo, Vladimir Oblast =

Gribanovo Грибаново
- Village
- Location within Vladimir Oblast Location within Russia
- Coordinates: 56°08′N 38°45′E
- Country: Russia
- Region: Vladimir Oblast
- District: Kirzhachsky District
- Time zone: UTC+3:00

Gribanovo (Russian: Грибаново) is a rural locality (a village) in Pershinskoye Rural Settlement, Kirzhachsky District, Vladimir Oblast, Russia. The population was 42 as of 2010. There are 10 streets.

== Geography ==
Gribanovo is located 10 km west of Kirzhach (the district's administrative centre) by road. Khrapki is the nearest rural locality.
