= Starkovo, Kirzhachsky District, Vladimir Oblast =

Starkovo Старково
- Village
- Location within Vladimir Oblast Location within Russia
- Coordinates: 56°14′N 38°55′E
- Country: Russia
- Region: Vladimir Oblast
- District: Kirzhachsky District
- Time zone: UTC+3:00

Starkovo (Russian: Старково) is a rural locality (a village) in Gorkinskoye Rural Settlement, Kirzhachsky District, Vladimir Oblast, Russia. The population was 3 as of 2010.

== Geography ==
Starkovo is located 17 km north of Kirzhach (the district's administrative centre) by road. Ivashevo is the nearest rural locality.
