= Nikitkino, Kirzhachsky District, Vladimir Oblast =

Nikitkino Никиткино
- Village
- Location within Vladimir Oblast Location within Russia
- Coordinates: 56°15′N 39°02′E
- Country: Russia
- Region: Vladimir Oblast
- District: Kirzhachsky District
- Time zone: UTC+3:00

Nikitkino (Russian: Никиткино) is a rural locality (a village) in Kiprevskoye Rural Settlement, Kirzhachsky District, Vladimir Oblast, Russia. The population was 5 as of 2010. There are 5 streets.

== Geography ==
Nikitkino is located 24 km northeast of Kirzhach (the district's administrative centre) by road. Afanasovo is the nearest rural locality.
