= Lisitsyno, Vladimir Oblast =

Lisitsyno Лисицыно
- Settlement
- Location within Vladimir Oblast Location within Russia
- Coordinates: 56°05′N 38°39′E
- Country: Russia
- Region: Vladimir Oblast
- District: Kirzhachsky District
- Time zone: UTC+3:00

Lisitsyno (Russian: Лисицыно) is a rural locality (a settlement) in Filippovskoye Rural Settlement, Kirzhachsky District, Vladimir Oblast, Russia. The population was 3 as of 2010. There are 3 streets.

== Geography ==
Lisitsyno is located 17 km southwest of Kirzhach (the district's administrative centre) by road. Melezhi is the nearest rural locality.
