= Khrapki =

Khrapki Храпки
- Village
- Location within Vladimir Oblast Location within Russia
- Coordinates: 56°07′N 38°46′E
- Country: Russia
- Region: Vladimir Oblast
- District: Kirzhachsky District
- Time zone: UTC+3:00

Khrapki (Russian: Храпки) is a rural locality (a village) in Pershinskoye Rural Settlement, Kirzhachsky District, Vladimir Oblast, Russia. The population was 170 as of 2010. There are 18 streets.

== Geography ==
Khrapki is located 8 km southwest of Kirzhach (the district's administrative centre) by road. Gribanovo is the nearest rural locality.
