= Zherdeyevo =

Zherdeyevo Жердеево
- Village
- Location within Vladimir Oblast Location within Russia
- Coordinates: 56°18′N 38°57′E
- Country: Russia
- Region: Vladimir Oblast
- District: Kirzhachsky District
- Time zone: UTC+3:00

Zherdeyevo (Russian: Жердеево) is a rural locality (a village) in Kiprevskoye Rural Settlement, Kirzhachsky District, Vladimir Oblast, Russia. The population was 81 as of 2010. There is 1 street.

== Geography ==
Zherdeyevo is located 21 km northeast of Kirzhach (the district's administrative centre) by road. Nedyurevo is the nearest rural locality.
