= Khmelevo =

Khmelevo Хмелево
- Village
- Location within Vladimir Oblast Location within Russia
- Coordinates: 56°08′N 39°08′E
- Country: Russia
- Region: Vladimir Oblast
- District: Kirzhachsky District
- Time zone: UTC+3:00

Khmelevo (Russian: Хмелево) is a rural locality (a village) in Kiprevskoye Rural Settlement, Kirzhachsky District, Vladimir Oblast, Russia. The population was 67 as of 2010. There are 3 streets.

== Geography ==
Khmelevo is located 25 km southeast of Kirzhach (the district's administrative centre) by road. Novinki is the nearest rural locality.
