= Pershino, Kirzhachsky District, Vladimir Oblast =

Pershino Першино
- Settlement
- Location within Vladimir Oblast Location within Russia
- Coordinates: 56°08′N 38°44′E
- Country: Russia
- Region: Vladimir Oblast
- District: Kirzhachsky District
- Time zone: UTC+3:00

Pershino (Russian: Першино) is a rural locality (a settlement) and the administrative center of Pershinskoye Rural Settlement, Kirzhachsky District, Vladimir Oblast, Russia. The population was 1,497 as of 2010. There are 14 streets.

== Geography ==
Pershino is located on the Sherna River, 11 km southwest of Kirzhach (the district's administrative centre) by road. Gribanovo is the nearest rural locality.
