= Fineyevo =

Fineyevo Финеево
- Village
- Location within Vladimir Oblast Location within Russia
- Coordinates: 56°02′N 38°53′E
- Country: Russia
- Region: Vladimir Oblast
- District: Kirzhachsky District
- Time zone: UTC+3:00

Fineyevo (Russian: Финеево) is a rural locality (a village) in Pershinskoye Rural Settlement, Kirzhachsky District, Vladimir Oblast, Russia. The population was 58 as of 2010. There are 21 streets.

== Geography ==
Fineyevo is located 15 km south of Kirzhach (the district's administrative centre) by road. Starovo is the nearest rural locality.
