= Myzzhelovo =

Myzzhelovo Мызжелово
- Village
- Location within Vladimir Oblast Location within Russia
- Coordinates: 56°07′N 39°05′E
- Country: Russia
- Region: Vladimir Oblast
- District: Kirzhachsky District
- Time zone: UTC+3:00

Myzzhelovo (Russian: Мызжелово) is a rural locality (a village) in Kiprevskoye Rural Settlement, Kirzhachsky District, Vladimir Oblast, Russia. The population was 13 as of 2010. There is 1 street.

== Geography ==
Myzzhelovo is located on the Sheredar River, 23 km southeast of Kirzhach (the district's administrative centre) by road. Mitenino is the nearest rural locality.
