= Sergiyevka, Vladimir Oblast =

Sergiyevka Сергиевка
- Village
- Location within Vladimir Oblast Location within Russia
- Coordinates: 56°08′N 38°39′E
- Country: Russia
- Region: Vladimir Oblast
- District: Kirzhachsky District
- Time zone: UTC+3:00

Sergiyevka (Russian: Сергиевка) is a rural locality (a village) in Filippovskoye Rural Settlement, Kirzhachsky District, Vladimir Oblast, Russia. The population was 53 as of 2010. There are 4 streets.

== Geography ==
Sergiyevka is located on the Sherna River, 17 km west of Kirzhach (the district's administrative centre) by road. Berezhki is the nearest rural locality.
