= Dubki, Kirzhachsky District, Vladimir Oblast =

Dubki Дубки
- Village
- Location within Vladimir Oblast Location within Russia
- Coordinates: 56°06′N 38°41′E
- Country: Russia
- Region: Vladimir Oblast
- District: Kirzhachsky District
- Time zone: UTC+3:00

Dubki (Russian: Дубки) is a rural locality (a village) in Filippovskoye Rural Settlement, Kirzhachsky District, Vladimir Oblast, Russia. The population was 67 as of 2010. There are 20 streets.

== Geography ==
Dubki is located 14 km southwest of Kirzhach (the district's administrative centre) by road. Shuvalovo is the nearest rural locality.
