= Krasny Ogorok =

Krasny Ogorok Красный Огорок
- Village
- Location within Vladimir Oblast Location within Russia
- Coordinates: 56°00′N 38°42′E
- Country: Russia
- Region: Vladimir Oblast
- District: Kirzhachsky District
- Time zone: UTC+3:00

Krasny Ogorok (Russian: Красный Огорок) is a rural locality (a village) in Filippovskoye Rural Settlement, Kirzhachsky District, Vladimir Oblast, Russia. The population was 6 as of 2010. There are 7 streets.

== Geography ==
Krasny Ogorok is located 32 km southwest of Kirzhach (the district's administrative centre) by road. Zemlyanki is the nearest rural locality.
