= Kashino, Kirzhachsky District, Vladimir Oblast =

Kashino Кашино
- Village
- Location within Vladimir Oblast Location within Russia
- Coordinates: 55°59′N 38°51′E
- Country: Russia
- Region: Vladimir Oblast
- District: Kirzhachsky District
- Time zone: UTC+3:00

Kashino (Russian: Кашино) is a rural locality (a village) in Filippovskoye Rural Settlement, Kirzhachsky District, Vladimir Oblast, Russia. The population was 252 as of 2010. There are 9 streets.

== Geography ==
Kashino is located 32 km south of Kirzhach (the district's administrative centre) by road. Pesyane is the nearest rural locality.
