= Savelyevo =

Savelyevo Савельево
- Village
- Location within Vladimir Oblast Location within Russia
- Coordinates: 56°17′N 39°06′E
- Country: Russia
- Region: Vladimir Oblast
- District: Kirzhachsky District
- Time zone: UTC+3:00

Savelyevo (Russian: Савельево) is a rural locality (a village) in Kiprevskoye Rural Settlement, Kirzhachsky District, Vladimir Oblast, Russia. The population was 56 as of 2010. There are 2 streets.

== Geography ==
Savelyevo is located 23 km northeast of Kirzhach (the district's administrative centre) by road. Yasnaya Polyana is the nearest rural locality.
