= Mitino, Kirzhachsky District, Vladimir Oblast =

Mitino Митино
- Village
- Location within Vladimir Oblast Location within Russia
- Coordinates: 56°11′N 39°06′E
- Country: Russia
- Region: Vladimir Oblast
- District: Kirzhachsky District
- Time zone: UTC+3:00

Mitino (Russian: Митино) is a rural locality (a village) in Kiprevskoye Rural Settlement, Kirzhachsky District, Vladimir Oblast, Russia. The population was 2 as of 2010. There are 4 streets.

== Geography ==
Mitino is located 21 km east of Kirzhach (the district's administrative centre) by road. Khalino is the nearest rural locality.
