= Polutino =

Polutino Полутино
- Village
- Location within Vladimir Oblast Location within Russia
- Coordinates: 56°06′N 38°56′E
- Country: Russia
- Region: Vladimir Oblast
- District: Kirzhachsky District
- Time zone: UTC+3:00

Polutino (Russian: Полутино) is a rural locality (a village) in Kiprevskoye Rural Settlement, Kirzhachsky District, Vladimir Oblast, Russia. The population was 27 as of 2010. There are 9 streets.

== Geography ==
Polutino is located 10 km southeast of Kirzhach (the district's administrative centre) by road. Trokhino is the nearest rural locality.
