= Marinkino =

Marinkino Маринкино
- Village
- Location within Vladimir Oblast Location within Russia
- Coordinates: 56°10′N 39°06′E
- Country: Russia
- Region: Vladimir Oblast
- District: Kirzhachsky District
- Time zone: UTC+3:00

Marinkino (Russian: Маринкино) is a rural locality (a village) in Kiprevskoye Rural Settlement, Kirzhachsky District, Vladimir Oblast, Russia. The population was 1 as of 2010. There is 1 street.

== Geography ==
Marinkino is located 21 km east of Kirzhach (the district's administrative centre) by road. Ofushino is the nearest rural locality.
