= Peregudovo =

Peregudovo Перегудово
- Village
- Location within Vladimir Oblast Location within Russia
- Coordinates: 56°14′N 38°45′E
- Country: Russia
- Region: Vladimir Oblast
- District: Kirzhachsky District
- Time zone: UTC+3:00

Peregudovo (Russian: Перегудово) is a rural locality (a village) in Gorkinskoye Rural Settlement, Kirzhachsky District, Vladimir Oblast, Russia. The population was 22 as of 2010. There are 4 streets.

== Geography ==
Peregudovo is located 17 km northwest of Kirzhach (the district's administrative centre) by road. Semyonovskoye is the nearest rural locality.
