= Kharlamovo, Kirzhachsky District, Vladimir Oblast =

Kharlamovo Харламово
- Village
- Location within Vladimir Oblast Location within Russia
- Coordinates: 56°04′N 39°01′E
- Country: Russia
- Region: Vladimir Oblast
- District: Kirzhachsky District
- Time zone: UTC+3:00

Kharlamovo (Russian: Харламово) is a rural locality (a village) in Kiprevskoye Rural Settlement, Kirzhachsky District, Vladimir Oblast, Russia. The population was 4 as of 2010. There is 1 street.

== Geography ==
Kharlamovo is located 20 km southeast of Kirzhach (the district's administrative centre) by road. Novoselovo is the nearest rural locality.
