= Kurbatovo =

Kurbatovo Курбатово
- Village
- Location within Vladimir Oblast Location within Russia
- Coordinates: 56°12′N 38°46′E
- Country: Russia
- Region: Vladimir Oblast
- District: Kirzhachsky District
- Time zone: UTC+3:00

Kurbatovo (Russian: Курбатово) is a rural locality (a village) in Gorkinskoye Rural Settlement, Kirzhachsky District, Vladimir Oblast, Russia. The population was 14 as of 2010. There are 3 streets.

== Geography ==
Kurbatovo is located on the Sherna River, 17 km northwest of Kirzhach (the district's administrative centre) by road. Karpovo is the nearest rural locality.
