= Belkovo (settlement), Kirzhachsky District, Vladimir Oblast =

Belkovo Бельково
- Settlement
- Location within Vladimir Oblast Location within Russia
- Coordinates: 56°16′N 38°47′E
- Country: Russia
- Region: Vladimir Oblast
- District: Kirzhachsky District
- Time zone: UTC+3:00

Belkovo (Russian: Бельково) is a rural locality (a settlement) in Gorkinskoye Rural Settlement, Kirzhachsky District, Vladimir Oblast, Russia. The population was 61 as of 2010.

== Geography ==
The village is located 3 km north from Gorka, 14 km north from Kirzhach.
