= Beltsy, Vladimir Oblast =

Beltsy Бельцы
- Village
- Location within Vladimir Oblast Location within Russia
- Coordinates: 56°13′N 39°04′E
- Country: Russia
- Region: Vladimir Oblast
- District: Kirzhachsky District
- Time zone: UTC+3:00

Beltsy (Russian: Бельцы) is a rural locality (a village) in Kiprevskoye Rural Settlement, Kirzhachsky District, Vladimir Oblast, Russia. The population was 13 as of 2010. There is 1 street.

== Geography ==
Beltsy is located on the Vakhchilka River, 19 km northeast of Kirzhach (the district's administrative centre) by road. Zherdevo is the nearest rural locality.

== History ==
In the 19th - early 20th centuries, the village was part of the Zherdevsky volost of the Pokrovsky district ,
