= Bynino =

Bynino Бынино
- Village
- Location within Vladimir Oblast Location within Russia
- Coordinates: 55°57′N 38°50′E
- Country: Russia
- Region: Vladimir Oblast
- District: Kirzhachsky District
- Time zone: UTC+3:00

Bynino (Russian: Бынино) is a rural locality (a village) in Filippovskoye Rural Settlement, Kirzhachsky District, Vladimir Oblast, Russia. The population was 17 as of 2010. There are 13 streets.

== Geography ==
Bynino is located on the Bolshaya Dubna River, 35 km south of Kirzhach (the district's administrative centre) by road. Golovino is the nearest rural locality.
