= Yasnaya Polyana, Vladimir Oblast =

Yasnaya Polyana Ясная Поляна
- Village
- Location within Vladimir Oblast Location within Russia
- Coordinates: 56°18′N 39°05′E
- Country: Russia
- Region: Vladimir Oblast
- District: Kirzhachsky District
- Time zone: UTC+3:00

Yasnaya Polyana (Russian: Ясная Поляна) is a rural locality (a village) in Kiprevskoye Rural Settlement, Kirzhachsky District, Vladimir Oblast, Russia. The population was 3 as of 2010. There is 1 street.

== Geography ==
Yasnaya Polyana is located on the Shorna River, 26 km northeast of Kirzhach (the district's administrative centre) by road. Skomorokhovo is the nearest rural locality.
