= Zherdevo =

Zherdevo Жердево
- Village
- Location within Vladimir Oblast Location within Russia
- Coordinates: 56°14′N 39°06′E
- Country: Russia
- Region: Vladimir Oblast
- District: Kirzhachsky District
- Time zone: UTC+3:00

Zherdevo (Russian: Жердево) is a rural locality (a village) in Kiprevskoye Rural Settlement, Kirzhachsky District, Vladimir Oblast, Russia. The population was 6 as of 2010. There are 2 streets.

== Geography ==
Zherdevo is located 18 km northeast of Kirzhach (the district's administrative centre) by road. Zheldybino is the nearest rural locality.
