= Dvorishchi =

Dvorishchi (Russian: Дворищи) is the name of several rural localities in Russia:

- Dvorishchi, Ivanovo Oblast, a village in Yuryevetsky District of Ivanovo Oblast
- Dvorishchi, Kostroma Oblast, a village in Apraksinskoye Settlement of Kostromskoy District of Kostroma Oblast
- Dvorishchi, Khvoyninsky District, Novgorod Oblast, a village in Dvorishchenskoye Settlement of Khvoyninsky District of Novgorod Oblast
- Dvorishchi, Malovishersky District, Novgorod Oblast, a village in Burginskoye Settlement of Malovishersky District of Novgorod Oblast
- Dvorishchi, Pskov Oblast, a village in Pustoshkinsky District of Pskov Oblast
- Dvorishchi, Tver Oblast, a village in Lesnoy District of Tver Oblast
- Dvorishchi, Vladimir Oblast, a village in Kirzhachsky District of Vladimir Oblast
