= Kiprevo =

Kiprevo Кипрево
- Village
- Location within Vladimir Oblast Location within Russia
- Coordinates: 56°14′N 38°59′E
- Country: Russia
- Region: Vladimir Oblast
- District: Kirzhachsky District
- Time zone: UTC+3:00

Kiprevo (Russian: Кипрево) is a rural locality (a village) and the administrative center of Kiprevskoye Rural Settlement, Kirzhachsky District, Vladimir Oblast, Russia. The population was 538 as of 2010. There are 6 streets.

== Geography ==
Kiprevo is located 13 km northeast of Kirzhach (the district's administrative centre) by road. Yefremovo is the nearest rural locality.
