= Vlasyevo, Vladimir Oblast =

Vlasyevo Власьево
- Village
- Location within Vladimir Oblast Location within Russia
- Coordinates: 56°11′N 39°01′E
- Country: Russia
- Region: Vladimir Oblast
- District: Kirzhachsky District
- Time zone: UTC+3:00

Vlasyevo (Russian: Власьево) is a rural locality (a village) in Kiprevskoye Rural Settlement, Kirzhachsky District, Vladimir Oblast, Russia. The population was 3 as of 2010. There are 5 streets.

== Geography ==
Vlasyevo is located on the Vakhchilka River, 14 km northeast of Kirzhach (the district's administrative centre) by road. Baburino is the nearest rural locality.
