= Rozhkovo =

Rozhkovo Рожково
- Village
- Location within Vladimir Oblast Location within Russia
- Coordinates: 56°05′N 38°33′E
- Country: Russia
- Region: Vladimir Oblast
- District: Kirzhachsky District
- Time zone: UTC+3:00

Rozhkovo (Russian: Рожково) is a rural locality (a village) in Filippovskoye Rural Settlement, Kirzhachsky District, Vladimir Oblast, Russia. The population was 12 as of 2010. There are 2 streets.

== Geography ==
Rozhkovo is located on the Melyozha River, 26 km southwest of Kirzhach (the district's administrative centre) by road. Zakharovo is the nearest rural locality.
