= Nikiforovo, Vladimir Oblast =

Nikiforovo Никифорово
- Village
- Location within Vladimir Oblast Location within Russia
- Coordinates: 56°03′N 38°56′E
- Country: Russia
- Region: Vladimir Oblast
- District: Kirzhachsky District
- Time zone: UTC+3:00

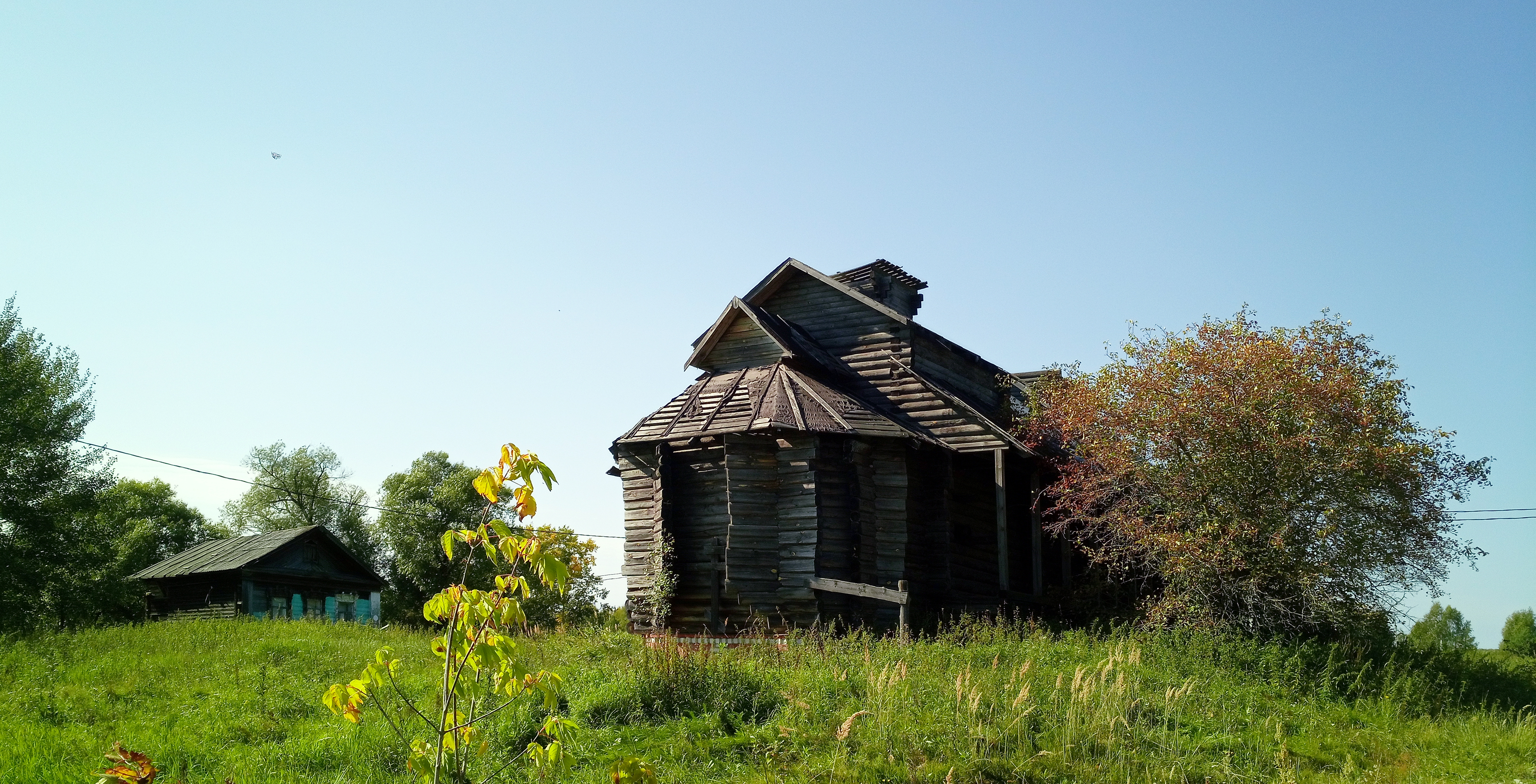
An unfinished Seraphim Church in Nikiforovo village

Nikiforovo (Russian: Никифорово) is a rural locality (a village) in Pershinskoye Rural Settlement, Kirzhachsky District, Vladimir Oblast, Russia. The population was 27 as of 2010. There are 5 streets.

== Geography ==
Nikiforovo is located 20 km south of Kirzhach (the district's administrative centre) by road. Ilyinskoye is the nearest rural locality.
