= Telvyakovo =

Telvyakovo Тельвяково
- Village
- Location within Vladimir Oblast Location within Russia
- Coordinates: 56°06′N 39°00′E
- Country: Russia
- Region: Vladimir Oblast
- District: Kirzhachsky District
- Time zone: UTC+3:00

Telvyakovo (Russian: Тельвяково) is a rural locality (a village) in Kiprevskoye Rural Settlement, Kirzhachsky District, Vladimir Oblast, Russia. The population was 39 as of 2010. There are 12 streets.

== Geography ==
Telvyakovo is located on the Vakhchilka River, 12 km southeast of Kirzhach (the district's administrative centre) by road. Akulovo is the nearest rural locality.
