= Nedyurevo =

Nedyurevo Недюрево
- Village
- Location within Vladimir Oblast Location within Russia
- Coordinates: 56°18′N 38°59′E
- Country: Russia
- Region: Vladimir Oblast
- District: Kirzhachsky District
- Time zone: UTC+3:00

Nedyurevo (Russian: Недюрево) is a rural locality (a village) in Kiprevskoye Rural Settlement, Kirzhachsky District, Vladimir Oblast, Russia. The population was 10 as of 2010. There are 7 streets.

== Geography ==
Nedyurevo is located on the Bolshoy Kirzhach River, 23 km northeast of Kirzhach (the district's administrative centre) by road. Zherdeyevo is the nearest rural locality.
