= Trokhino =

Trokhino Трохино
- Village
- Location within Vladimir Oblast Location within Russia
- Coordinates: 56°04′N 38°56′E
- Country: Russia
- Region: Vladimir Oblast
- District: Kirzhachsky District
- Time zone: UTC+3:00

Trokhino (Russian: Трохино) is a rural locality (a village) in Kiprevskoye Rural Settlement, Kirzhachsky District, Vladimir Oblast, Russia. The population was 1 as of 2010. There are 2 streets.

== Geography ==
Trokhino is located 13 km southeast of Kirzhach (the district's administrative centre) by road. Polutino is the nearest rural locality.
