= Skomorokhovo =

Skomorokhovo Скоморохово
- Village
- Location within Vladimir Oblast Location within Russia
- Coordinates: 56°18′N 39°05′E
- Country: Russia
- Region: Vladimir Oblast
- District: Kirzhachsky District
- Time zone: UTC+3:00

Skomorokhovo (Russian: Скоморохово) is a rural locality (a village) in Kiprevskoye Rural Settlement, Kirzhachsky District, Vladimir Oblast, Russia. The population was 4 as of 2010. There are 2 streets.

== Geography ==
Skomorokhovo is located on the Shorna River, 27 km northeast of Kirzhach (the district's administrative centre) by road. Yasnaya Polyana is the nearest rural locality.
