= Karpovo, Kirzhachsky District, Vladimir Oblast =

Karpovo Карпово
- Village
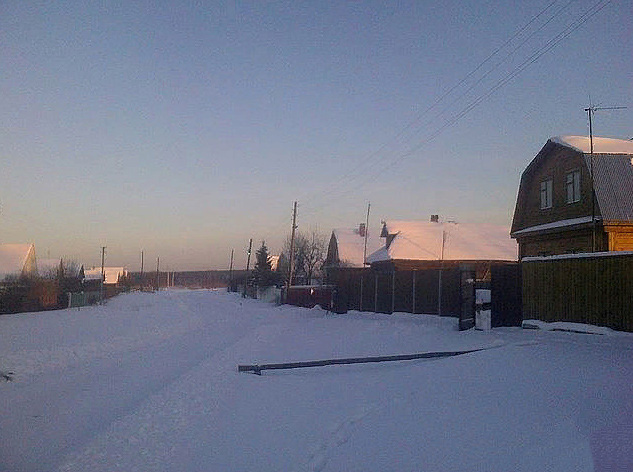

- Location within Vladimir Oblast Location within Russia
- Coordinates: 56°13′N 38°46′E
- Country: Russia
- Region: Vladimir Oblast
- District: Kirzhachsky District
- Time zone: UTC+3:00

Karpovo (Russian: Карпово) is a rural locality (a village) in Gorkinskoye Rural Settlement, Kirzhachsky District, Vladimir Oblast, Russia. The population was 25 as of 2010.

== Geography ==
Karpovo is located on the Sherna River, 16 km northwest of Kirzhach (the district's administrative centre) by road. Vasilyovo is the nearest rural locality.
