= Zheldybino (settlement), Vladimir Oblast =

Zheldybino Желдыбино
- Settlement
- Location within Vladimir Oblast Location within Russia
- Coordinates: 56°13′N 39°02′E
- Country: Russia
- Region: Vladimir Oblast
- District: Kirzhachsky District
- Time zone: UTC+3:00

Zheldybino (Russian: Желдыбино) is a rural locality (a settlement) in Kiprevskoye Rural Settlement, Kirzhachsky District, Vladimir Oblast, Russia. The population was 44 as of 2010. There are 3 streets.

== Geography ==
Zheldybino is located 13 km northeast of Kirzhach (the district's administrative centre) by road. Baburino is the nearest rural locality.
