= Ivashevo =

Ivashevo Ивашево
- Village
- Location within Vladimir Oblast Location within Russia
- Coordinates: 56°14′N 38°53′E
- Country: Russia
- Region: Vladimir Oblast
- District: Kirzhachsky District
- Time zone: UTC+3:00

Ivashevo (Russian: Ивашево) is a rural locality (a village) in Gorkinskoye Rural Settlement, Kirzhachsky District, Vladimir Oblast, Russia. The population was 15 as of 2010. There is 1 street.

== Geography ==
Ivashevo is located 14 km north of Kirzhach (the district's administrative centre) by road. Savino is the nearest rural locality.
