= Baburino =

Baburino Бабурино
- Village
- Location within Vladimir Oblast Location within Russia
- Coordinates: 56°12′N 39°00′E
- Country: Russia
- Region: Vladimir Oblast
- District: Kirzhachsky District
- Time zone: UTC+3:00

Baburino (Russian: Бабурино) is a rural locality (a village) in Kiprevskoye Rural Settlement, Kirzhachsky District, Vladimir Oblast, Russia. The population was 23 as of 2010. There are 11 streets.

== Geography ==
Baburino is located 12 km northeast of Kirzhach (the district's administrative centre) by road. Yefremovo is the nearest rural locality.
