= Akulovo, Vladimir Oblast =

Akulovo Акулово
- Village
- Location within Vladimir Oblast Location within Russia
- Coordinates: 56°04′N 38°59′E
- Country: Russia
- Region: Vladimir Oblast
- District: Kirzhachsky District
- Time zone: UTC+3:00

Akulovo (Russian: Акулово) is a rural locality (a village) in Kiprevskoye Rural Settlement, Kirzhachsky District, Vladimir Oblast, Russia. The population was 30 as of 2010. There are 8 streets.

== Geography ==
Akulovo is located 15 km southeast of Kirzhach (the district's administrative centre) by road. Trokhino is the nearest rural locality.
