= Sopovskiye Zemlyanki =

Sopovskiye Zemlyanki Соповские Землянки
- Village
- Location within Vladimir Oblast Location within Russia
- Coordinates: 56°00′N 38°43′E
- Country: Russia
- Region: Vladimir Oblast
- District: Kirzhachsky District
- Time zone: UTC+3:00

Sopovskiye Zemlyanki (Russian: Соповские Землянки) is a rural locality (a village) in Filippovskoye Rural Settlement, Kirzhachsky District, Vladimir Oblast, Russia. The population was 17 as of 2010. There are 3 streets.

== Geography ==
Sopovskiye Zemlyanki is located 31 km southwest of Kirzhach (the district's administrative centre) by road. Krasny Ugol is the nearest rural locality.
