= Naumovo, Kirzhachsky District, Vladimir Oblast =

Naumovo Наумово
- Village
- Location within Vladimir Oblast Location within Russia
- Coordinates: 56°09′N 38°46′E
- Country: Russia
- Region: Vladimir Oblast
- District: Kirzhachsky District
- Time zone: UTC+3:00

Naumovo (Russian: Наумово) is a rural locality (a village) in Gorkinskoye Rural Settlement, Kirzhachsky District, Vladimir Oblast, Russia. The population was 19 as of 2010. There are 6 streets.

== Geography ==
Naumovo is located on the Sherna River, 11 km west of Kirzhach (the district's administrative centre) by road. Yeltsy is the nearest rural locality.
