= Khalino, Vladimir Oblast =

Khalino Халино
- Village
- Location within Vladimir Oblast Location within Russia
- Coordinates: 56°10′N 39°04′E
- Country: Russia
- Region: Vladimir Oblast
- District: Kirzhachsky District
- Time zone: UTC+3:00

Khalino (Russian: Халино) is a rural locality (a village) in Kiprevskoye Rural Settlement, Kirzhachsky District, Vladimir Oblast, Russia. The population was 7 as of 2010. There are 5 streets.

== Geography ==
Khalino is located 19 km east of Kirzhach (the district's administrative centre) by road. Marinkino is the nearest rural locality.
