= Kirzhach (inhabited locality) =

Kirzhach (Russian: Киржач) is the name of several inhabited localities in Vladimir Oblast, Russia.

Urban localities

- Kirzhach, a town in Kirzhachsky District

Rural localities

- Kirzhach, Petushinsky District, Vladimir Oblast, a village in Petushinsky District
