= Krutets, Kirzhachsky District, Vladimir Oblast =

Krutets Крутец
- Village
- Location within Vladimir Oblast Location within Russia
- Coordinates: 56°09′N 38°32′E
- Country: Russia
- Region: Vladimir Oblast
- District: Kirzhachsky District
- Time zone: UTC+3:00

Krutets (Russian: Крутец) is a rural locality (a village) in Filippovskoye Rural Settlement, Kirzhachsky District, Vladimir Oblast, Russia. The population was 18 as of 2010. There are 5 streets.

== Geography ==
Krutets is located 28 km west of Kirzhach (the district's administrative centre) by road. Ryazantsy is the nearest rural locality.
