= Ratkovo, Kirzhachsky District, Vladimir Oblast =

Ratkovo Ратьково
- Village
- Location within Vladimir Oblast Location within Russia
- Coordinates: 56°00′N 38°37′E
- Country: Russia
- Region: Vladimir Oblast
- District: Kirzhachsky District
- Time zone: UTC+3:00

Ratkovo (Russian: Ратьково) is a rural locality (a village) in Filippovskoye Rural Settlement, Kirzhachsky District, Vladimir Oblast, Russia. The population was 139 as of 2010. There are 21 streets.

== Geography ==
Ratkovo is located 36 km southwest of Kirzhach (the district's administrative centre) by road. Zarechye is the nearest rural locality.
