= Bukhlovo =

Bukhlovo Бухлово
- Village
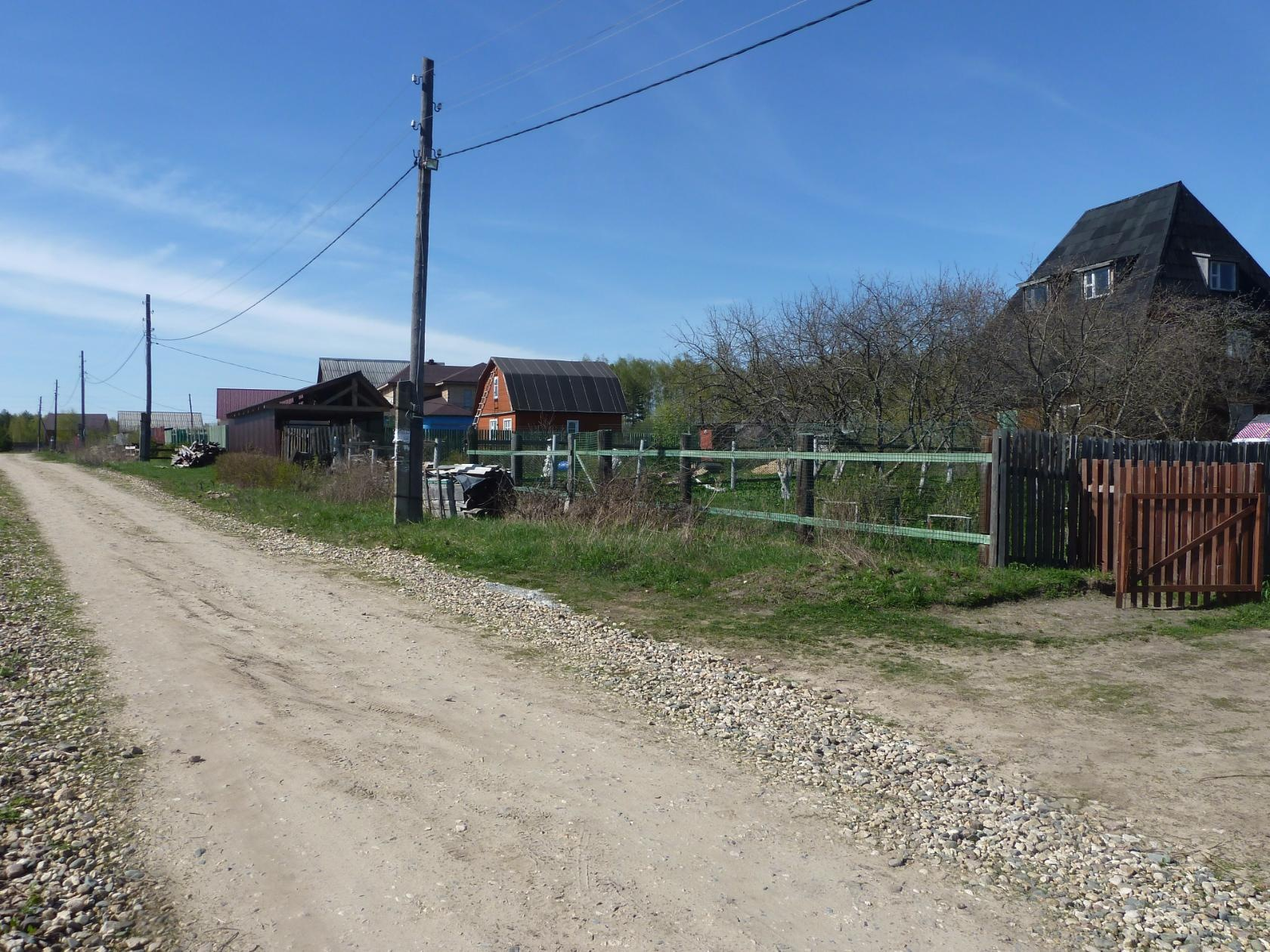
- there are houses and a road and trees

- Location within Vladimir Oblast Location within Russia
- Coordinates: 56°04′N 39°03′E
- Country: Russia
- Region: Vladimir Oblast
- District: Kirzhachsky District
- Time zone: UTC+3:00

Bukhlovo (Russian: Бухлово) is a rural locality (a village) in Kiprevskoye Rural Settlement, Kirzhachsky District, Vladimir Oblast, Russia. The population was 2 as of 2010. There is 1 street.

== Geography ==
Bukhlovo is located 17 km southeast of Kirzhach (the district's administrative centre) by road. Novosyolovo is the nearest rural locality.
