= Starovo, Kirzhachsky District, Vladimir Oblast =

Starovo Старово
- Village
- Location within Vladimir Oblast Location within Russia
- Coordinates: 56°01′N 38°54′E
- Country: Russia
- Region: Vladimir Oblast
- District: Kirzhachsky District
- Time zone: UTC+3:00

Starovo (Russian: Старово) is a rural locality (a village) in Pershinskoye Rural Settlement, Kirzhachsky District, Vladimir Oblast, Russia. The population was 37 as of 2010. There are 3 streets.

== Geography ==
Starovo is located 19 km south of Kirzhach (the district's administrative centre) by road. Sanino is the nearest rural locality.
