= Yefremovo, Kirzhachsky District, Vladimir Oblast =

Yefremovo Ефремово
- Village
- Location within Vladimir Oblast Location within Russia
- Coordinates: 56°13′N 38°59′E
- Country: Russia
- Region: Vladimir Oblast
- District: Kirzhachsky District
- Time zone: UTC+3:00

Yefremovo (Russian: Ефремово) is a rural locality (a village) in Kiprevskoye Rural Settlement, Kirzhachsky District, Vladimir Oblast, Russia. The population was 450 as of 2010. There are three streets.

== Geography ==
Yefremovo is located 10 km northeast of Kirzhach (the district's administrative centre) by road. Kiprevo is the nearest rural locality.
