= Dvorishchi, Vladimir Oblast =

Dvorishchi Дворищи
- Village
- Location within Vladimir Oblast Location within Russia
- Coordinates: 56°04′N 38°35′E
- Country: Russia
- Region: Vladimir Oblast
- District: Kirzhachsky District
- Time zone: UTC+3:00

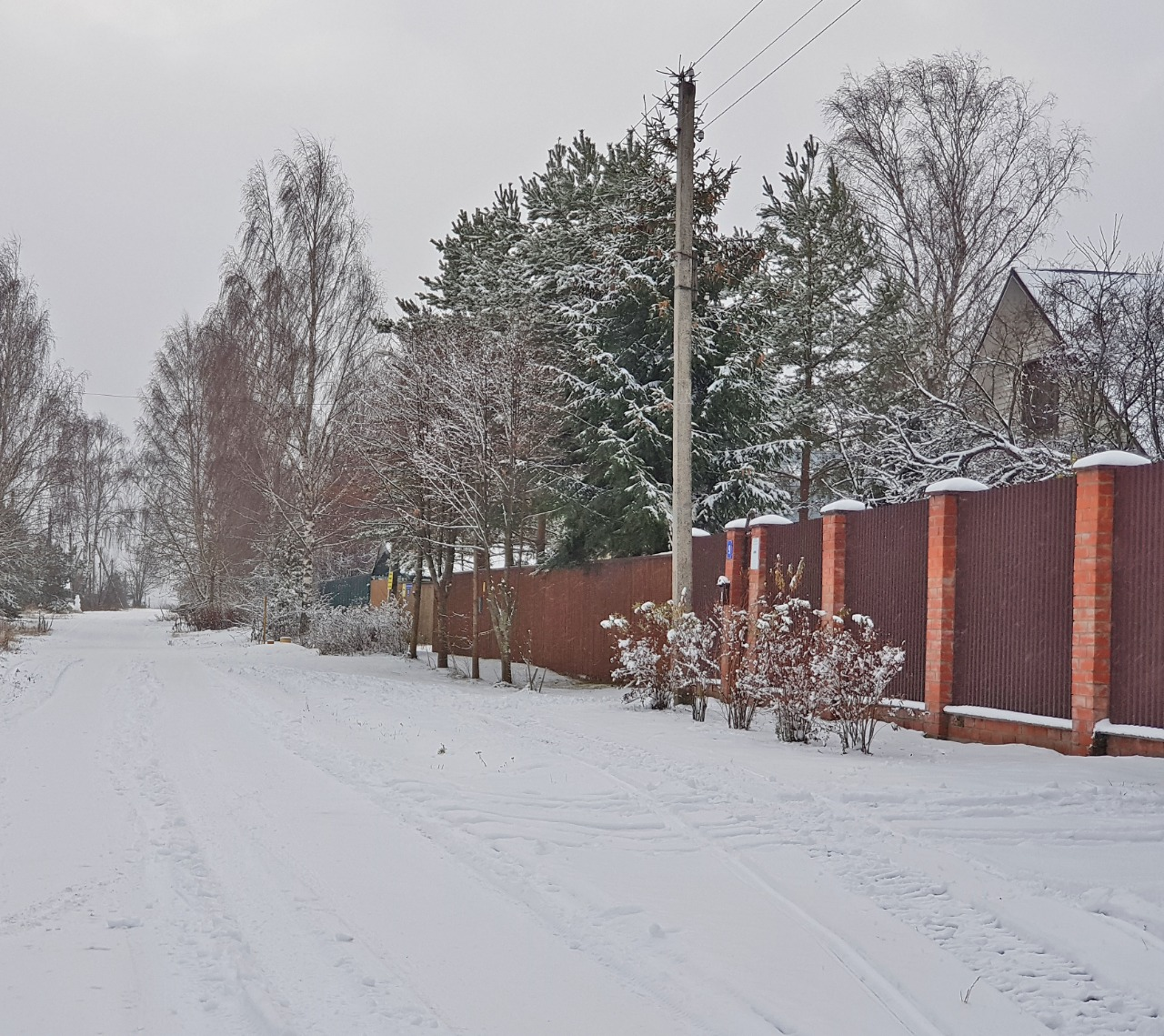
Dvorishchi village, Tsentralnaya St.

Dvorishchi (Russian: Дворищи) is a rural locality (a village) in Filippovskoye Rural Settlement, Kirzhachsky District, Vladimir Oblast, Russia. The population was 74 as of 2010.

== Geography ==
Dvorishchi is located on the Sherna River, 26 km southwest of Kirzhach (the district's administrative centre) by road. Filippovskoye is the nearest rural locality.
