= Klimkovo, Vladimir Oblast =

Klimkovo Климково
- Village
- Location within Vladimir Oblast Location within Russia
- Coordinates: 56°18′N 39°02′E
- Country: Russia
- Region: Vladimir Oblast
- District: Kirzhachsky District
- Time zone: UTC+3:00

Klimkovo (Russian: Климково) is a rural locality (a village) in Kiprevskoye Rural Settlement, Kirzhachsky District, Vladimir Oblast, Russia. The population was 8 as of 2010. There is 1 street.

== Geography ==
Klimkovo is located on the Shorna River, 27 km northeast of Kirzhach (the district's administrative centre) by road. Truskovo is the nearest rural locality.
