= Yurtsovo, Kirzhachsky District, Vladimir Oblast =

Yurtsovo Юрцово
- Village
- Location within Vladimir Oblast Location within Russia
- Coordinates: 56°09′N 38°47′E
- Country: Russia
- Region: Vladimir Oblast
- District: Kirzhachsky District
- Time zone: UTC+3:00

Yurtsovo (Russian: Юрцово) is a rural locality (a village) in Gorkinskoye Rural Settlement, Kirzhachsky District, Vladimir Oblast, Russia. The population was 23 as of 2010. There are 8 streets.

== Geography ==
Yurtsovo is located 8 km west of Kirzhach (the district's administrative centre) by road. Naumovo is the nearest rural locality.
