= Filippovskoye, Vladimir Oblast =

Filippovskoye Филипповское
- Selo
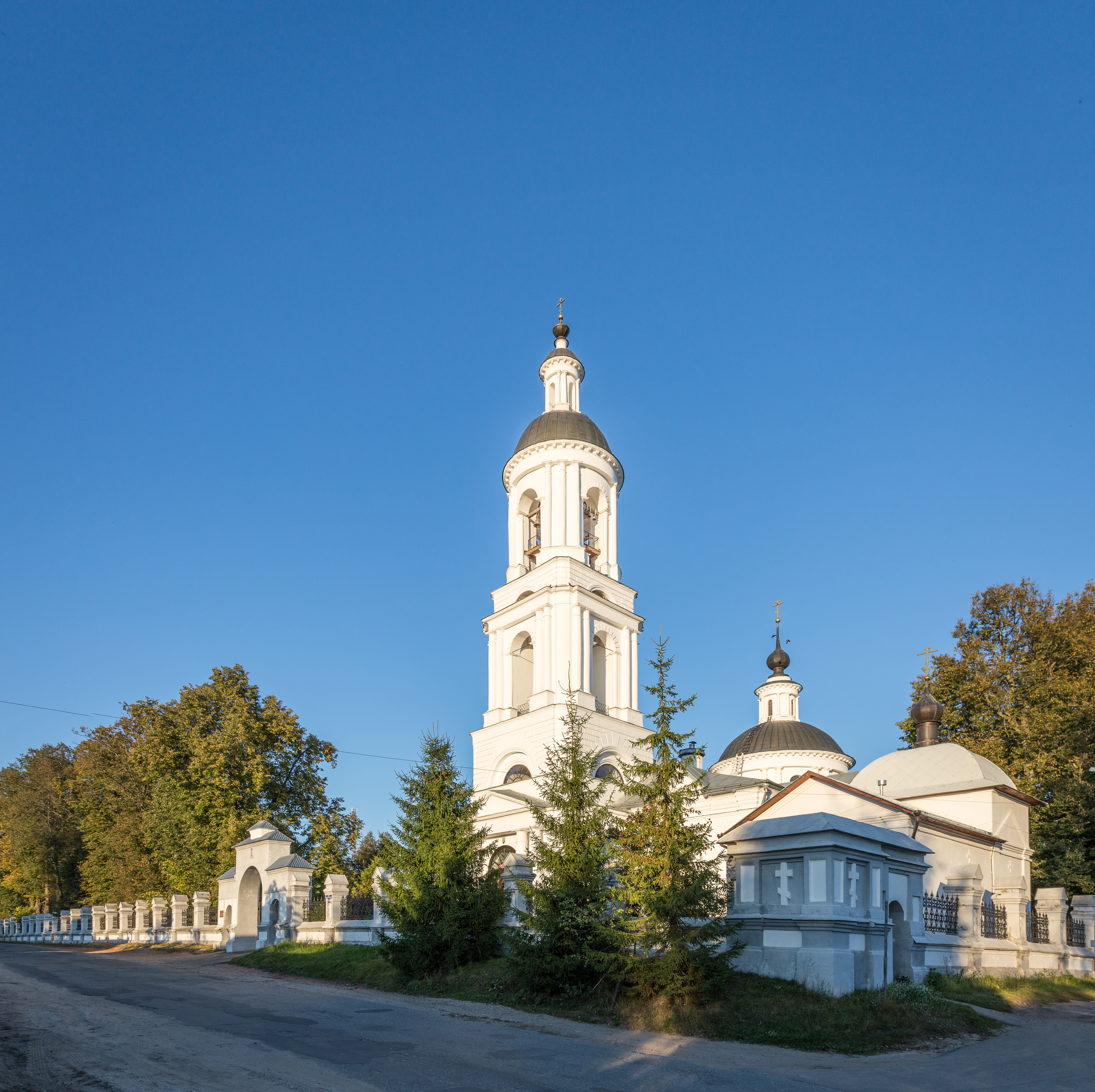
- Filippovskoye church

- Location within Vladimir Oblast Location within Russia
- Coordinates: 56°05′N 38°36′E
- Country: Russia
- Region: Vladimir Oblast
- District: Kirzhachsky District
- Time zone: UTC+3:00

Filippovskoye (Russian: Филипповское) is a rural locality (a selo) and the administrative center of Filippovskoye Rural Settlement, Kirzhachsky District, Vladimir Oblast, Russia. The population was 644 as of 2010. There are 38 streets.

== Geography ==
Filippovskoye is located 21 km southwest of Kirzhach (the district's administrative centre) by road. Alenino is the nearest rural locality.
