= Kirzhach (river) =

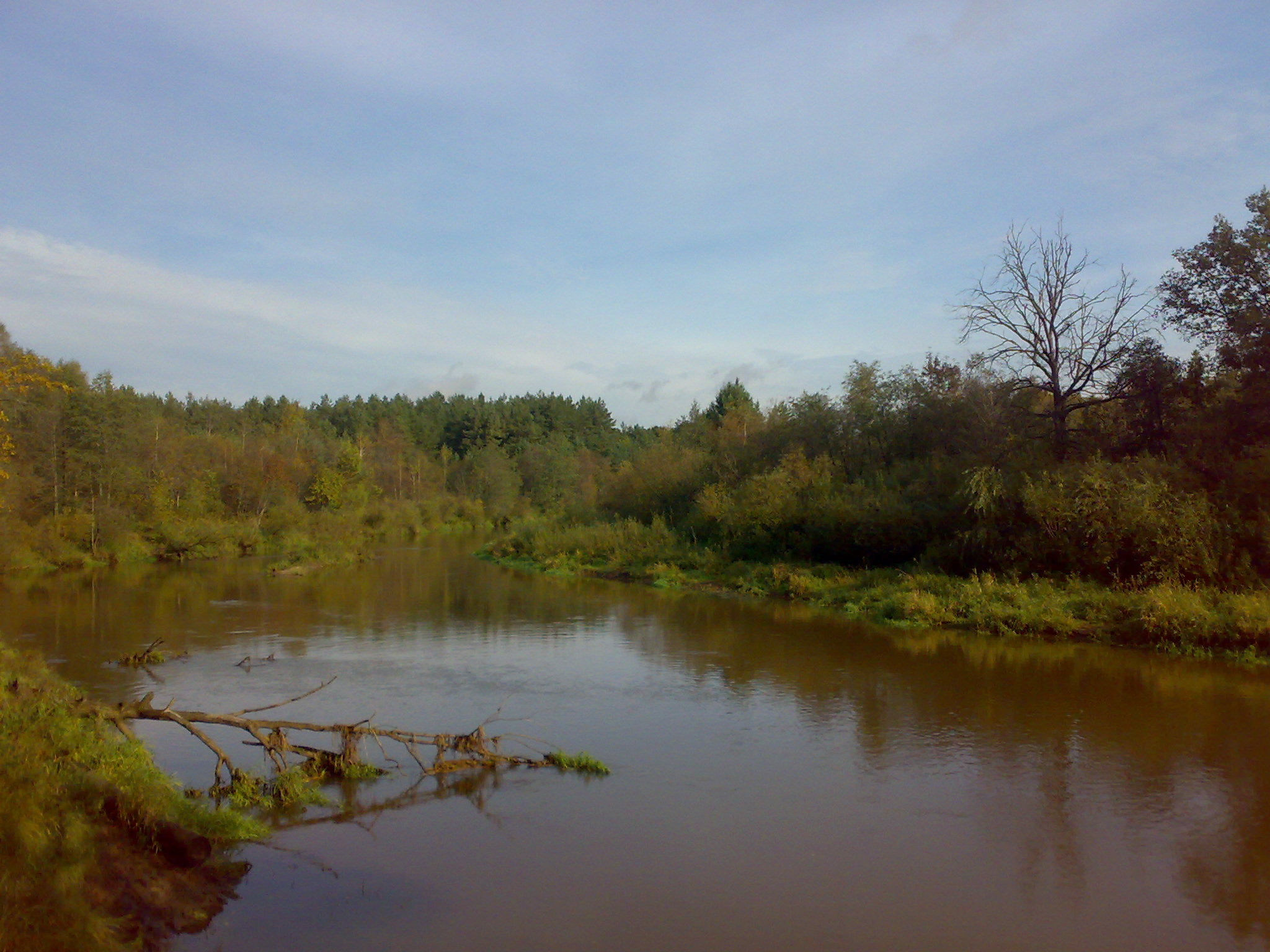
- The Kirzhach in summer
- Native name: Киржач (Russian)

Location
- Country: Russia

Physical characteristics
- Mouth: Klyazma
  - coordinates: 55°51′40″N 39°04′26″E
- Length: 133 km (83 mi)
- Basin size: 1,770 km^{2} (680 sq mi)

Basin features
- Progression: Klyazma→ Oka→ Volga→ Caspian Sea

The Kirzhach (Russian: Киржа́ч) is a river in Vladimir Oblast, Russia. It is a left tributary of the Klyazma (Volga's basin). The length of the river is 133 km (83 mi). The area of its drainage basin is 1770 km² (680 sq mi). The Kirzhach originates from the confluence of the Bolshoy Kirzhach and the Maly Kirzhach near Ivashevo Village. The river flows from north to south and empties into the Klyazma at Gorodishchi. The Kirzhach is a shallow river with a maximum depth of 4 m (13.1 ft) and a maximum width of 70 m (230 ft). It is not navigable for larger vessels, however it is very popular for canoeing and kayaking. Its major tributary is the Sheredar. The towns of Kirzhach and Gorodishchi are located on the shores of the Kirzhach.

The name is from Mordvin: Erzya: кяржи, Moksha: керш 'left' (sc. tributary).
