= Yurtsovo, Alexandrovsky District, Vladimir Oblast =

Yurtsovo Юрцово
- Village
- Location within Vladimir Oblast Location within Russia
- Coordinates: 56°16′N 38°41′E
- Country: Russia
- Region: Vladimir Oblast
- District: Alexandrovsky District
- Time zone: UTC+3:00

Yurtsovo (Russian: Юрцово) is a rural locality (a village) in Karinskoye Rural Settlement, Alexandrovsky District, Vladimir Oblast, Russia. The population was 21 as of 2010. There is 1 street.

== Geography ==
Yurtsovo is located on the Molokcha River, 16 km south of Alexandrov (the district's administrative centre) by road. Makhra is the nearest rural locality.
