= Klimkovo, Vologda Oblast =

Klimkovo Климково
- Village
- Location within Vologda Oblast Location within Russia
- Coordinates: 58°34′N 40°21′E
- Country: Russia
- Region: Vologda Oblast
- District: Gryazovetsky District
- Time zone: UTC+3:00

Klimkovo (Russian: Климково) is a rural locality (a village) in Rostilovskoye Rural Settlement, Gryazovetsky District, Vologda Oblast, Russia. The population was 4 as of 2002.

== Geography ==
Klimkovo is located 35 km (22 mi) south of Gryazovets (the district's administrative centre) by road. Novgorodovo is the nearest rural locality.
