= Gorodishchi =

Gorodishchi Городищи
- Village
- Location within Vladimir Oblast Location within Russia
- Coordinates: 56°11′N 42°39′E
- Country: Russia
- Region: Vladimir Oblast
- District: Gorokhovetsky District
- Time zone: UTC+3:00

Gorodishchi (Russian: Городищи) is a rural locality (a village) in Kupriyanovskoye Rural Settlement, Gorokhovetsky District, Vladimir Oblast, Russia. The population was 108 as of 2010.

== Geography ==
Gorodishchi is located near the Klyazma River, 4 km southwest of Gorokhovets (the district's administrative centre) by road. Slukino is the nearest rural locality.
