= Filippovsky, Altai Krai =

Filippovsky Филипповский
- Settlement
- Location within Altai Krai Location within Russia
- Coordinates: 53°37′N 80°41′E
- Country: Russia
- Region: Altai Krai
- District: Kamensky District
- Time zone: UTC+7:00

Filippovsky (Russian: Филипповский) is a rural locality (a settlement) and the administrative center of Filippovsky Selsoviet, Kamensky District, Altai Krai, Russia. The population was 315 as of 2013. There are 4 streets.

== Geography ==
Filippovsky is situated approximately 55 kilometers southwest of Kamen-na-Obi (the district's administrative centre) by road. The closest rural locality to Filippovsky is Zelyonaya Dubrava.
