= Kirzhach, Petushinsky District, Vladimir Oblast =

Kirzhach Киржач
- Village
- Location within Vladimir Oblast Location within Russia
- Coordinates: 55°54′N 39°04′E
- Country: Russia
- Region: Vladimir Oblast
- District: Petushinsky District
- Time zone: UTC+3:00

Kirzhach (Russian: Киржач) is a rural locality (a village) in Nagornoye Rural Settlement, Petushinsky District, Vladimir Oblast, Russia. The population was 138 as of 2010. There are 12 streets.

== Geography ==
Kirzhach is located 30 km west of Petushki (the district's administrative centre) by road. Zadneye Pole is the nearest rural locality.
