= Kirzhach =

Town in Vladimir Oblast, Russia

Kirzhach Киржач
- Town
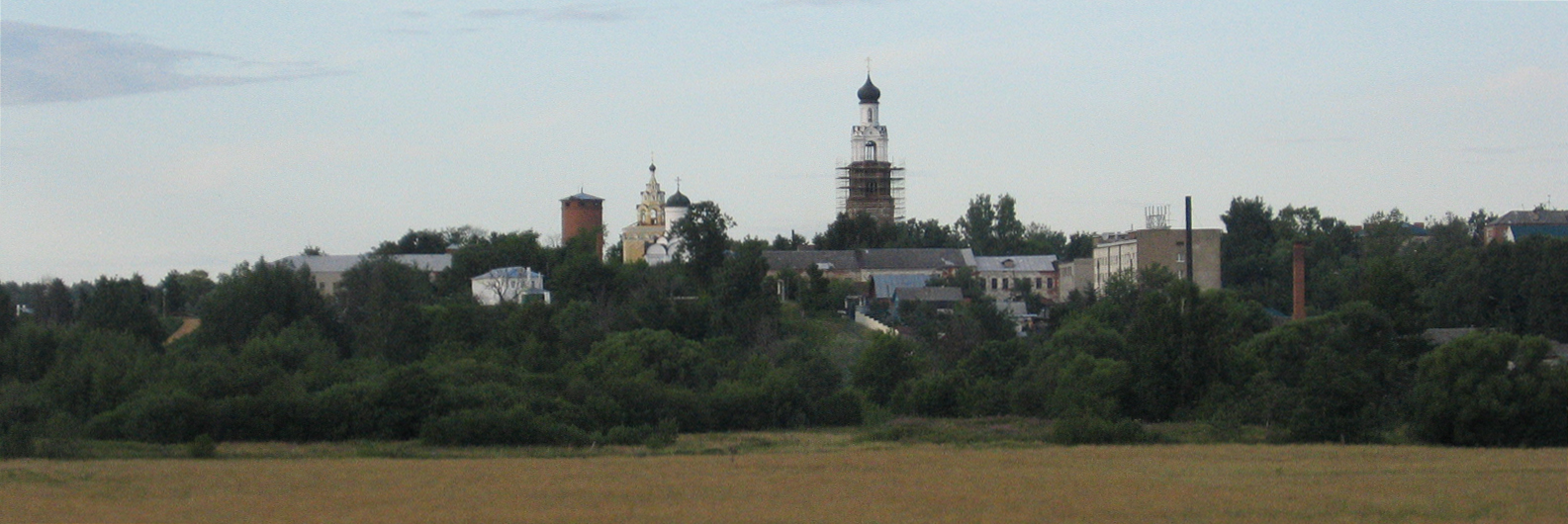
- Panoramic view of Kirzhach

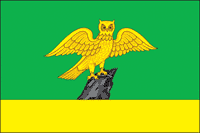
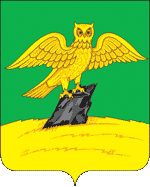
- Flag Coat of arms
- Interactive map of Kirzhach
- Location of Kirzhach Kirzhach (Vladimir Oblast)
- Coordinates: 56°09′N 38°52′E
- Country: Russia
- Federal subject: Vladimir Oblast
- Administrative district: Kirzhachsky District
- Founded: 14th century
- Town status since: 1778
- Elevation: 135 m (443 ft)

Population (2010 Census)
  - Total: 29,965
  - Estimate (2021): 27,318 (−8.8%)

Administrative status
  - Capital of: Kirzhachsky District

Municipal status
  - Municipal district: Kirzhachsky Municipal District
  - Urban settlement: Kirzhach Urban Settlement
  - Capital of: Kirzhachsky Municipal District, Kirzhach Urban Settlement
- Time zone: UTC+3 (MSK)
- Postal code: 601010
- OKTMO ID: 17630101001
- Website: gorodkirzhach.ru

Kirzhach (Russian: Киржач) is a town and the administrative center of Kirzhachsky District in Vladimir Oblast, Russia, located on the Kirzhach River in the west of the oblast, 125 kilometers (78 mi) west of Vladimir and 29 kilometers (18 mi) south of Alexandrov. Population: 27,318 (2021 census).

== Etymology ==
The town is named after the Kirzhach River, which flows through the town. The root of the name (kirzh) corresponds to a Moksha or Erzya word meaning "left".

== History ==
It was established in the 14th century as a sloboda assigned to the Annunciation Monastery. The latter was established by Saint Sergius of Radonezh, who lived in the area between 1354 and 1358. For most of its history, the abbey remained heavily dependent upon the Trinity Lavra of St. Sergius, which lies 48 kilometers (30 mi) to the west. After the monastery was disbanded in 1764, the sloboda was granted municipal rights in 1778. Thereafter, Kirzhach, as many other towns in the vicinity, developed primarily as a textile center.

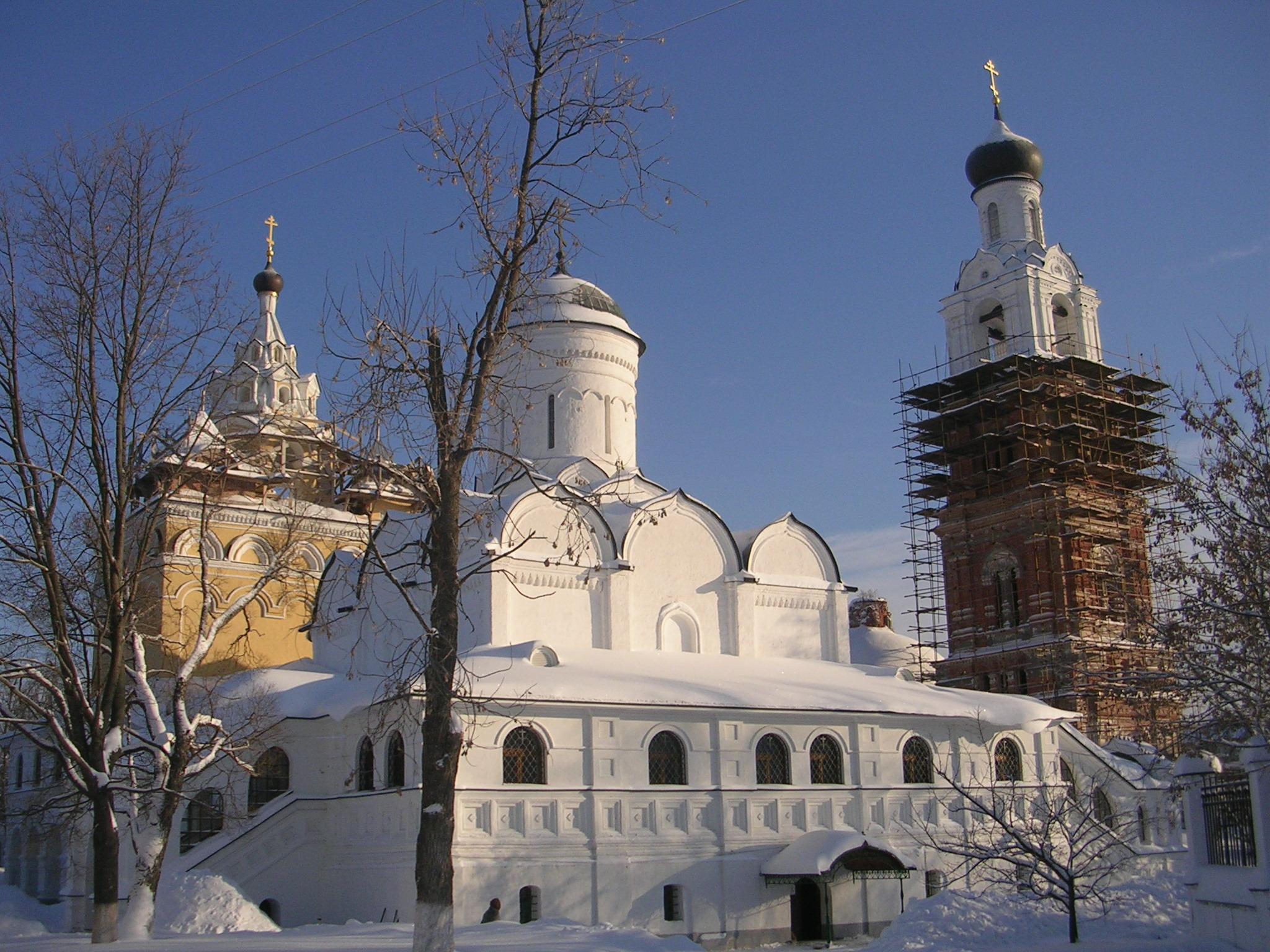
Annunciation Monastery in 2011

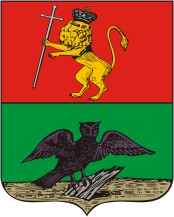
1781 coat of arms of Kirzhach

On October 12, 2004, the settlement of Krasny Oktyabr was merged with the town.

== Administrative and municipal status ==
Within the framework of administrative divisions, Kirzhach serves as the administrative center of Kirzhachsky District, to which it is directly subordinated. As a municipal division, the town of Kirzhach is incorporated within Kirzhachsky Municipal District as Kirzhach Urban Settlement.

== Climate ==
City's climate is moderately continental: a warm summer, a cold winter with a moderate spring and fall. Average temperature in January is −10.6 °C (12.9 °F) and +18.2 °C (64.8 °F) in July. Mean annual precipitation is 584 millimeters (23.0 in). It averages 151 days per year with temperatures above 0 °C (32 °F). A snow cover is present for four to five months; snow starts to fall usually at the end of November or at the beginning of December. Snow melts on sun-covered places in the middle of April and in forests at the end of April.

== Demographics ==
Historical population of Kirzhach
1897	1939	1959	1989	2002	2010	2021
4,799	11,600	18,100	25,431	22,704	29,965	27,318

== Architecture and landmarks ==
Kirzhach is famous for its great monastery—Blagoveschensky cathedral. The diminutive katholikon, erected during the reign of Ivan the Terrible, conforms to the early Muscovite type of cathedral church. It is commonly regarded as one of the last and loveliest specimens of this conservative strain. The monastery's open gallery connects the cathedral with the nearby Savior church, which has a square tower and a tent-like belfry. This church is a tomb of prominent Russian boyars-Miloslavskys.

The 16th-century church was demolished during the Soviet time, but people began to rebuild it in 1990s. Today the cathedral is a convent. Since 1997, the monastery possesses the relics of the Russian Saint, Roman Kirzhachsky, the student of another great Russian saint, Sergey Radonezhsky. Tourists can see two ancient St. Nikolay's churches—one was built in 1764, the other in 1846.

On the local art palace's facade is a plaque that commemorates the meeting of Yuri Gagarin, the world's first spaceman, with local people on 29 March 1963. On 27 March 1968, 18 km from Kirzhach (near the village of Novoselovo), Gagarin and flight instructor Vladimir Seryogin died in a plane crash. A large memorial, museum and visitors spot have been built on the crash site. Tourists can also see the buildings of shopping malls, built in the 1850s.
