= Kirzhachsky District =

Kirzhachsky District Киржачский район (Russian)
- District
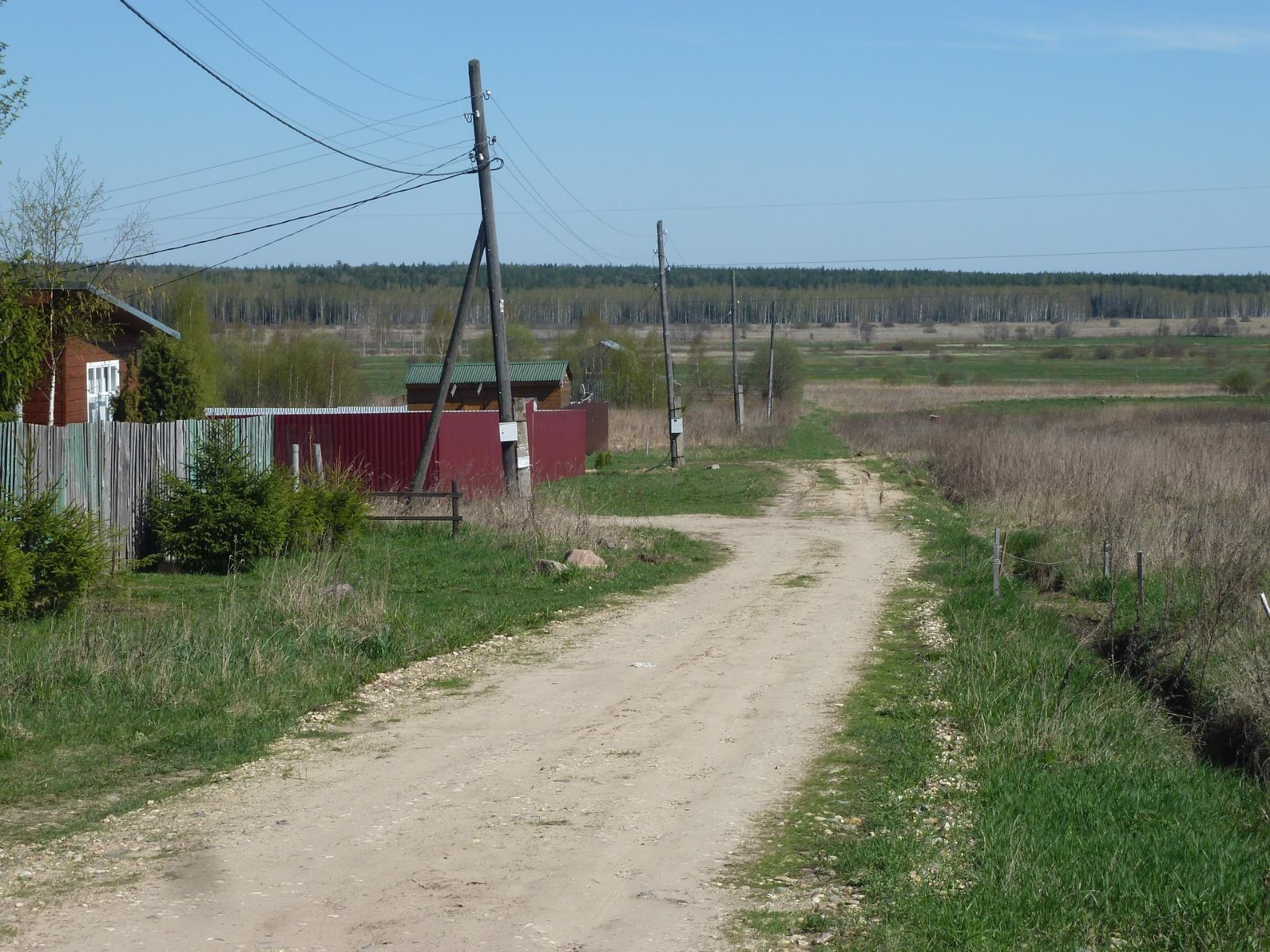
- Bukholovo village, Kirzhachsky District

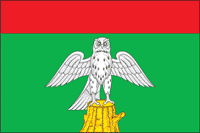
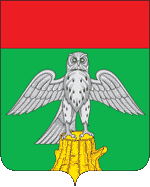
- Flag Coat of arms
- Location of Kirzhachsky District in Vladimir Oblast
- Coordinates: 56°10′N 38°52′E
- Country: Russia
- Federal subject: Vladimir Oblast
- Established: 10 April 1929
- Administrative center: Kirzhach

Area
  - Total: 1,135 km^{2} (438 sq mi)

Population (2010 Census)
  - Total: 42,159
  - Density: 37.14/km^{2} (96.20/sq mi)
  - Urban: 71.1%
  - Rural: 28.9%

Administrative structure
  - Inhabited localities: 1 cities/towns, 112 rural localities

Municipal structure
  - Municipally incorporated as: Kirzhachsky Municipal District
  - Municipal divisions: 1 urban settlements, 4 rural settlements
- Time zone: UTC+3 (MSK)
- OKTMO ID: 17630000
- Website: http://www.kirzhach.su/

Kirzhachsky District (Russian: Киржа́чский райо́н) is an administrative and municipal district (raion), one of the sixteen in Vladimir Oblast, Russia. It is located in the west of the oblast. The area of the district is 1,135 square kilometers (438 sq mi). Its administrative center is the town of Kirzhach. Population: 38,768 (2021 census); 42,159 (2010 census); 45,188 (2002 Census); 49,846 (1989 Soviet census). The population of Kirzhach accounts for 70.5% of the district's total population.
