= Golovino (disambiguation) =

Golovino, town in Tavush Province in Armenia

Golovino may also refer to:

- Golovino, Belgorod Oblast, Russia
- Golovino, Kirzhachsky District, Vladimir Oblast, Russia
- Golovino, Petushinsky District, Vladimir Oblast, Russia
- Golovino, Selivanovsky District, Vladimir Oblast, Russia
- Golovino, Sobinsky District, Vladimir Oblast, Russia
- Golovino, Sudogodsky District, Vladimir Oblast, Russia
- Golovino, Vyaznikovsky District, Vladimir Oblast, Russia

== See also ==
- Golovin (disambiguation)
- Golovinsky (disambiguation)
