= Golovin (surname) =

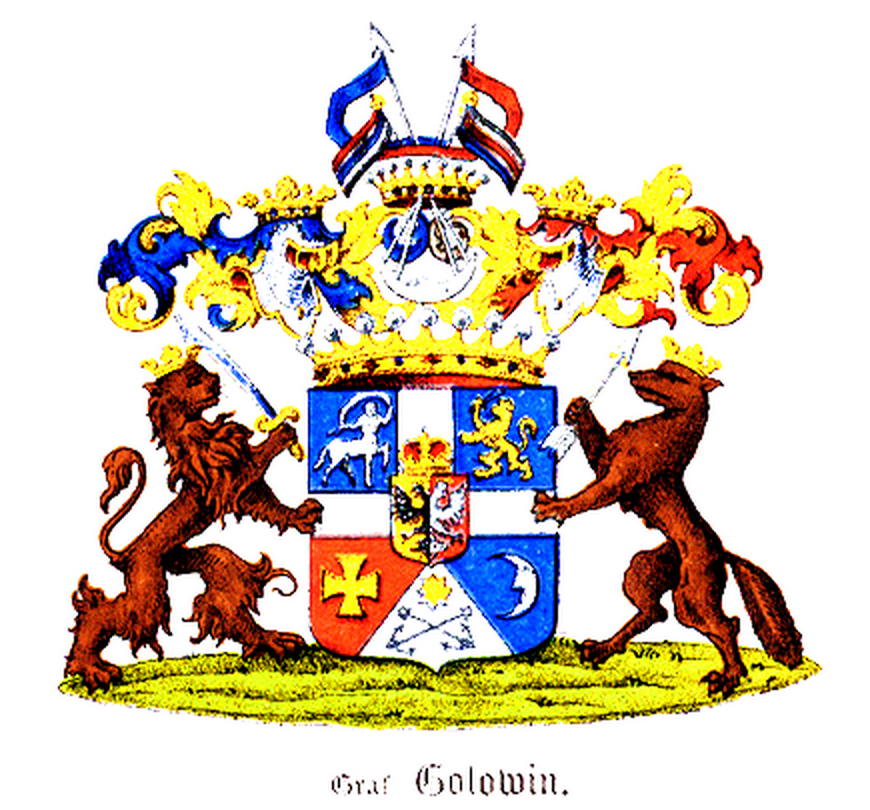
Coat of Arms of the Counts Golovin (1882)

The Golovin family was an ancient Russian noble family of Byzantine descent, whose members held the title of Count in the Russian Empire. The family has descended from the Khovrin family of Boyars and first appeared with the name of Golovin in the XVI century.

== History ==
The Russian noble families of Khovrin and Golovin claimed descent from the Gabras family, an ancient Byzantine nobility. This family ruled the small Principality of Theodoro, which was founded in the mid-14th century in the southwestern Crimea, in particular, in the area of Gothia. The first Gabras of Theodoro to be mentioned in the Russian documents is 'Stephen of Theodoro' ("Stepan Vasilyevich Khovra"), Prince of Gothia, who emigrated to Moscow in 1391 or 1402 along with his son Gregory. The two later became monks, and Gregory founded the Simonov Monastery. This branch of the Gabras family is commonly identified by scholars with the family known from Russian sources as "Khovra". Stepan's granddaughter, Maria of Gothia, became in 1426 the first wife of David of Trebizond, who reigned the last Emperor of Trebizond.

== Surname ==
Golovin (Russian: Головин) or Golovina (feminine; Головина) is also a Russian surname, derived from the word голова (golova, meaning "head" and probably referring to the head of a household or village).

== Notable surname bearers ==
- Alexis Golovin (born 1945), Russian pianist
- Aleksandr Golovin (artist) (1863–1930), Russian artist
- Aleksandr Golovin (footballer) (born 1996), Russian football player
- Aleksei Golovin (footballer) (born 1981), Russian football player
- Alexander Golovin (ice hockey) (born 1983), Russian ice hockey player
- Alexander Vasiliyevich Golovin (born 1949), Russian diplomat
- Anastasia Golovina (1850–1933), Bulgarian physician
- Boris Golovin (born 1955), Russian musician
- Elena Golovina (born 1961), Russian athlete
- Fyodor Alexeyevich Golovin (1650–1706), Russian politician
- Fyodor Alexandrovich Golovin (1867–1937), Russian politician
- Julia Golovina (born 1982), Ukrainian ice dancer
- Luba Golovina (born 1990), Georgian trampolinist
- Nikolai Golovin (1875–1944), Russian historian
- Pavel Golovin (1909–1940), Russian pilot
- Tatiana Golovin (born 1988), French tennis player
- Varvara Golovina (1766–1819), Russian artist
- Vladimir Golovin (born 1970), Hungarian handball player and coach
- Yevgeny Golovin (1782–1858), Russian general

== See also ==
- Golovin (disambiguation)
- Golovnin (surname)

== Sources ==
- Bryer, Anthony M. (1970). "A Byzantine Family: The Gabrades, c. 979 – c. 1653". University of Birmingham Historical Journal. 12. Birmingham: 164–187. ISSN 0261-2984.
- Vasiliev, Alexander A. (1936). The Goths in the Crimea. Cambridge, Massachusetts: The Mediaeval Academy of America. OCLC 249826006.
