= The Rooks Have Returned =

1871 painting by Alexei Savrasov

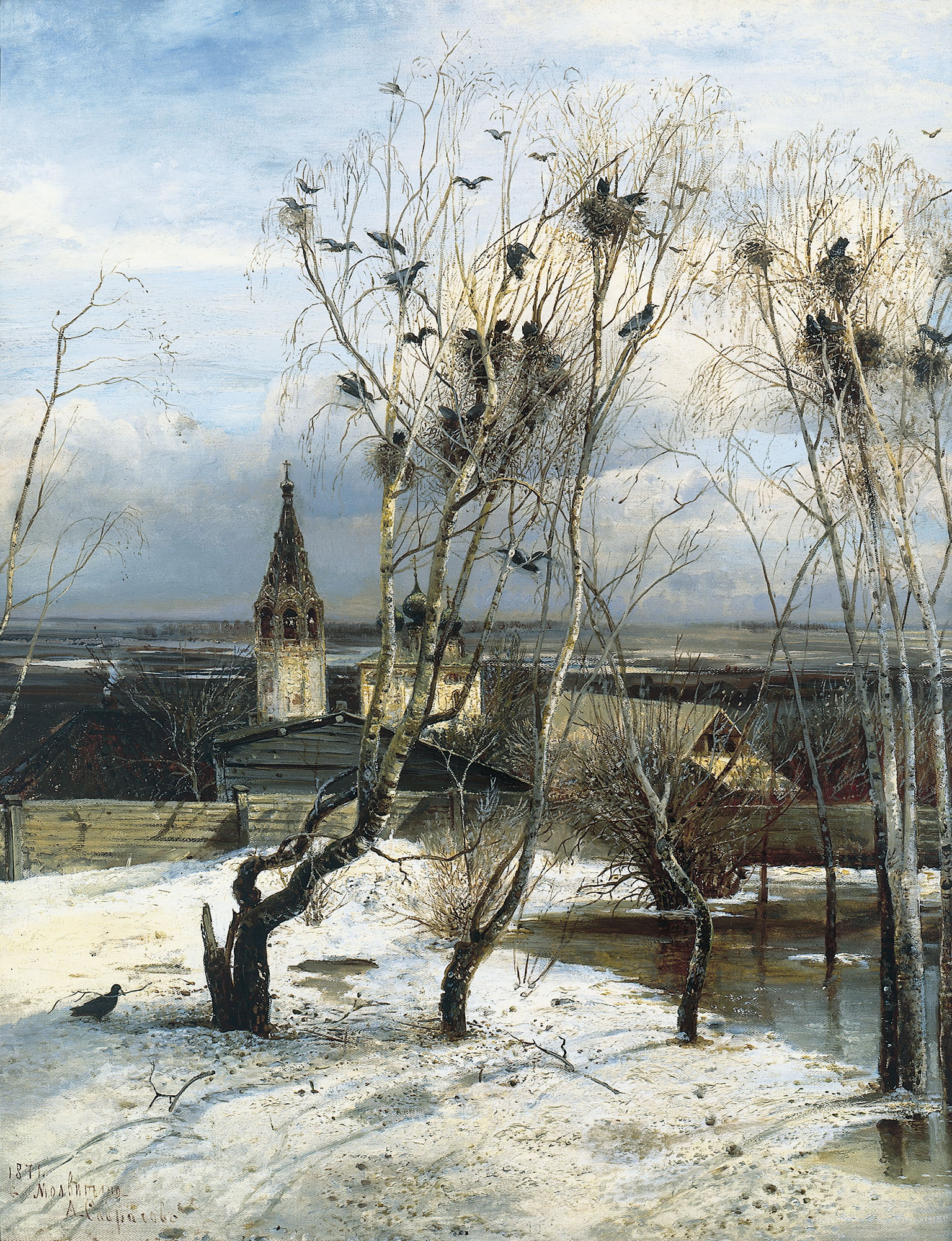
- Artist: Alexei Savrasov
- Year: 1871
- Dimensions: 62 cm × 48.5 cm (24 in × 19.1 in)
- Location: Tretyakov Gallery, Moscow

The Rooks Have Returned (Russian: Грачи прилетели, lit. 'The rooks have flown in') is a widely known landscape painting by Russian painter Alexei Savrasov (1830–1897). It was created in 1871 and is kept in the State Tretyakov Gallery (inv. 828). The size of the painting is 62 × 48.5 cm. The painting is considered Savrasov's most famous work, and its appearance is regarded as "an important stage in the development of Russian landscape painting."

Savrasov began working on The Rooks in March 1871. The studies for the future painting were done by the artist during his trip to the Kostroma Governorate, when he was in the village of Molvitino (now the village of Susanino, Kostroma Oblast). The prototype of the church depicted in the painting is the Church of the Resurrection, built in the late 17th century. The place where the artist worked is confirmed by his inscription made in the lower left corner of the canvas: "1871. S. Molvitino. A. Savrasov." Some researchers of Savrasov's work believe that the very first drawings and studies for the painting could have been performed by the artist in Yaroslavl or its environs, shortly before his trip to the Kostroma Governorate. After returning from Molvitino, Savrasov worked on the painting in Yaroslavl and then completed it in Moscow, where he returned in early May. The painting was named by the artist Here Come the Rooks. In the summer of 1871, the painting was purchased from Savrasov by Pavel Tretyakov.

The painting was exhibited at the Moscow Society of Art Lovers in autumn 1871. Later that year, it was presented at the 1st exhibition of the Society for Travelling Art Exhibitions (opened on 28 November in Saint Petersburg) under its current name (listed with an exclamation mark in the catalogue). The Rooks received good reviews: artist Ivan Kramskoi wrote that at the exhibition, this landscape "is the best, and it is truly beautiful," and art critic Vladimir Stasov noted that it is "probably the best and most original painting by Mr. Savrasov."

Painter Isaac Levitan considered The Rooks Have Returned to be one of Savrasov's best paintings. Noting the apparent uncomplicatedness of the plot, he wrote that "behind this simplicity, you feel the soft, good soul of the artist, to whom all this is dear and close to his heart..." Art historian Alexei Fedorov-Davydov called the painting an outstanding work of art and noted that "it has not only artistic, but also general cultural significance." Critic and musicologist Boris Asafiev wrote that the painting became "a symbol of the artistic renewal of the sphere of the Russian landscape for 'far ahead'", and that with this work Savrasov discovered "a new sense of spring and springiness."

== History ==
=== Background and creation ===
In late 1870, Alexei Savrasov, who was then a professor at the Moscow School of Painting, Sculpture and Architecture, took a five-month leave of absence to travel to Yaroslavl with his family, including his wife Sophia Karlovna and children. While on the Volga, he painted several works, such as View of the Volga near Yuryevets and The Spill of the Volga near Yaroslavl. In a letter to Pavel Tretyakov dated 31 December 1870, Savrasov wrote: "The quiet life in Yaroslavl allows me to concentrate on art", and in his New Year's greetings to his brother-in-law Karl Hertz, the artist reported: "After all the troubles, I am just beginning to work and am very satisfied with the studio and the apartment in general." In a correspondence with Tretyakov on 13 February, Savrasov reported that his pregnant wife was seriously ill. On 18 February, he wrote that his wife had given birth prematurely, and although she was recovering, the child was very weak. A few days later, the newborn girl died. The artist was deeply affected by the loss of his child, as evidenced by several paintings of his daughter's grave in the Yaroslavl cemetery.

Some researchers believe that it was the artist's depressed state following the tragedy that led to his vivid creative response to the phenomena heralding the arrival of spring. According to art historian Faina Maltseva, "the idea of a new painting, prompted by an encounter with an early spring landscape, can be confidently associated with Savrasov's stay in Yaroslavl". Art historian Vladimir Petrov also believes that the artist's first drawings and sketches for the planned painting were made in Yaroslavl, "under the influence of helpful in overcoming suffering 'healing vastness', the beauty of eternally renewed, resurrecting nature".

In March 1871, Savrasov visited the provincial centre of Kostroma Governorate. It appears that the artist travelled between Yaroslavl and Kostroma, which were 70 versts apart and not connected by railway, by sledge via the so-called 'highland road' (Russian: «нагорный тракт») that ran along the right bank of the Volga. The dates of this journey are uncertain, and determining them is complicated by the lack of detailed information about Savrasov's trip to Moscow in March of the same year. In a letter to Pavel Tretyakov dated 27 February, Savrasov reported that he planned to leave for Moscow around 2-5 March. If this was the case, it is clear that the artist could have only travelled to Kostroma province after returning from Moscow to Yaroslavl. However, it is known that Savrasov decided to exhibit his painting View of the Volga near Yuryevets at the Moscow Society of Art Lovers exhibition, which opened on 21 March. If he had planned to attend the beginning of the exhibition, he could have delayed his trip to Moscow and visited Kostroma Governorate beforehand.

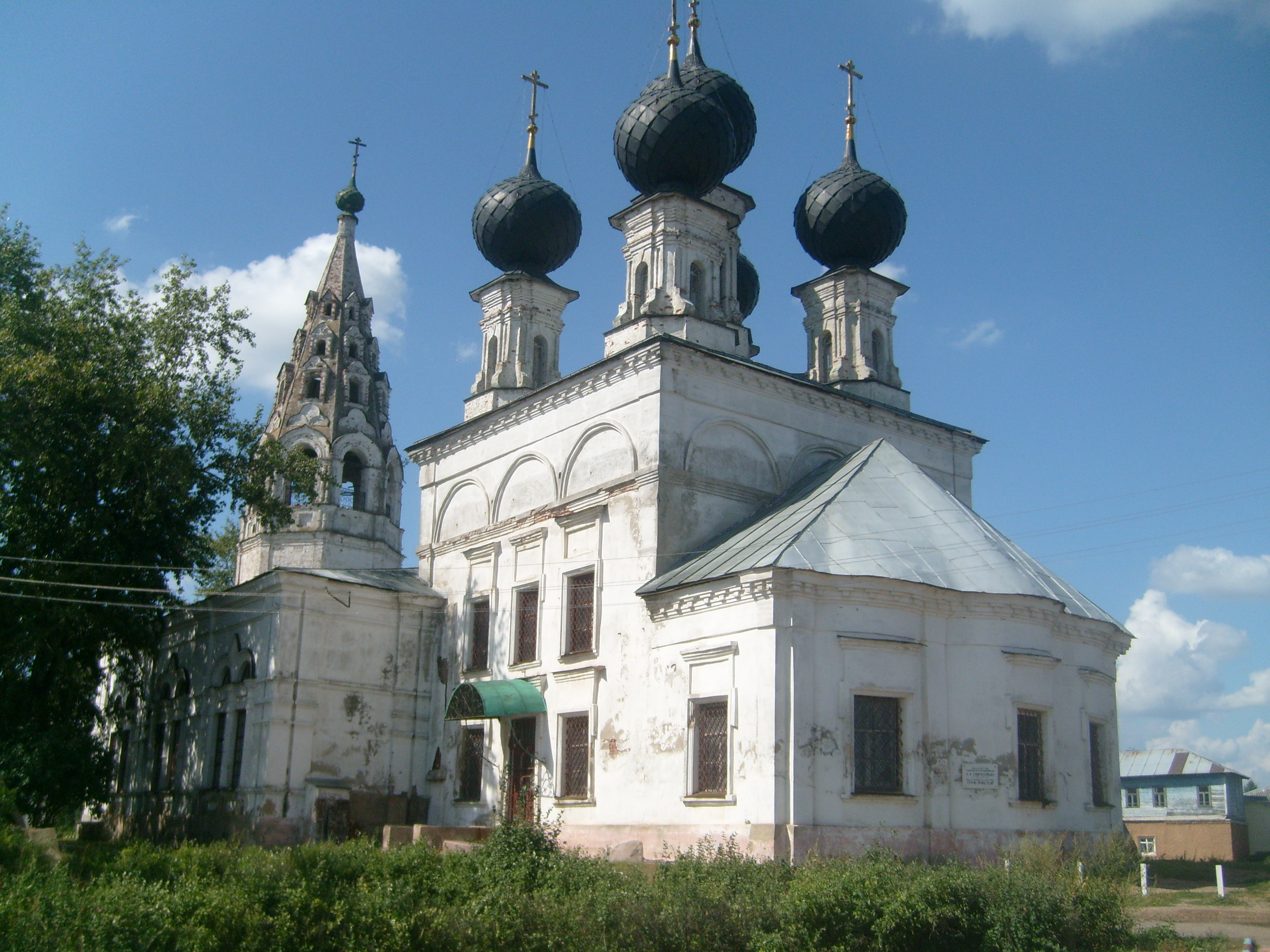
Church of the Resurrection in the village of Susanino (2010)

Savrasov travelled to Molvitino from Kostroma, which was then part of the Molvitino parish in the Buysky Uyezd of Kostroma Governorate (now Susanino, the administrative centre of Susaninsky district in Kostroma Oblast), where he painted the sketches for his future canvas The Rooks Have Returned. In an 1871 pamphlet on the Kostroma Governorate, these places were described as follows: "The location of Molvitin is beautiful. It is situated at the end of a high mountain, protruding into the valley in the form of a promontory, between two rivers, which under Molvitin join each other." The Resurrection Church, which still stands today, served as the prototype for the temple depicted in the painting. Construction of this stone church began in the early 1680s and was completed in 1690, likely by an artel of Yaroslavl masters. Only the bell tower has remained unchanged since the end of the 17th century. The temple itself has undergone several reconstructions, with the last significant changes dating back to 1855–1857, before it was depicted in Savrasov's painting. The church now serves as the Ivan Susanin Museum.

The reason why the artist Savrasov left Kostroma for Molvitino, located more than 50 versts north of the provincial centre, remains unclear to researchers. There are different versions on this subject. In one of his stories, the writer Vasily Osokin recounts an encounter between Savrasov and a peasant at the Kostroma market. The peasant mistook Savrasov for a iconographer and asked if he was going to Molvitino, a village with an unusual name that pleased the artist. Savrasov confirmed that he was indeed going there and accepted the peasant's offer of a lift. Kostroma's local historian Nikolai Zontikov believed that this version is "a figment of the writer's imagination" and wrote that "it is only regrettable that it was included in some works about Savrasov as an indisputable fact."

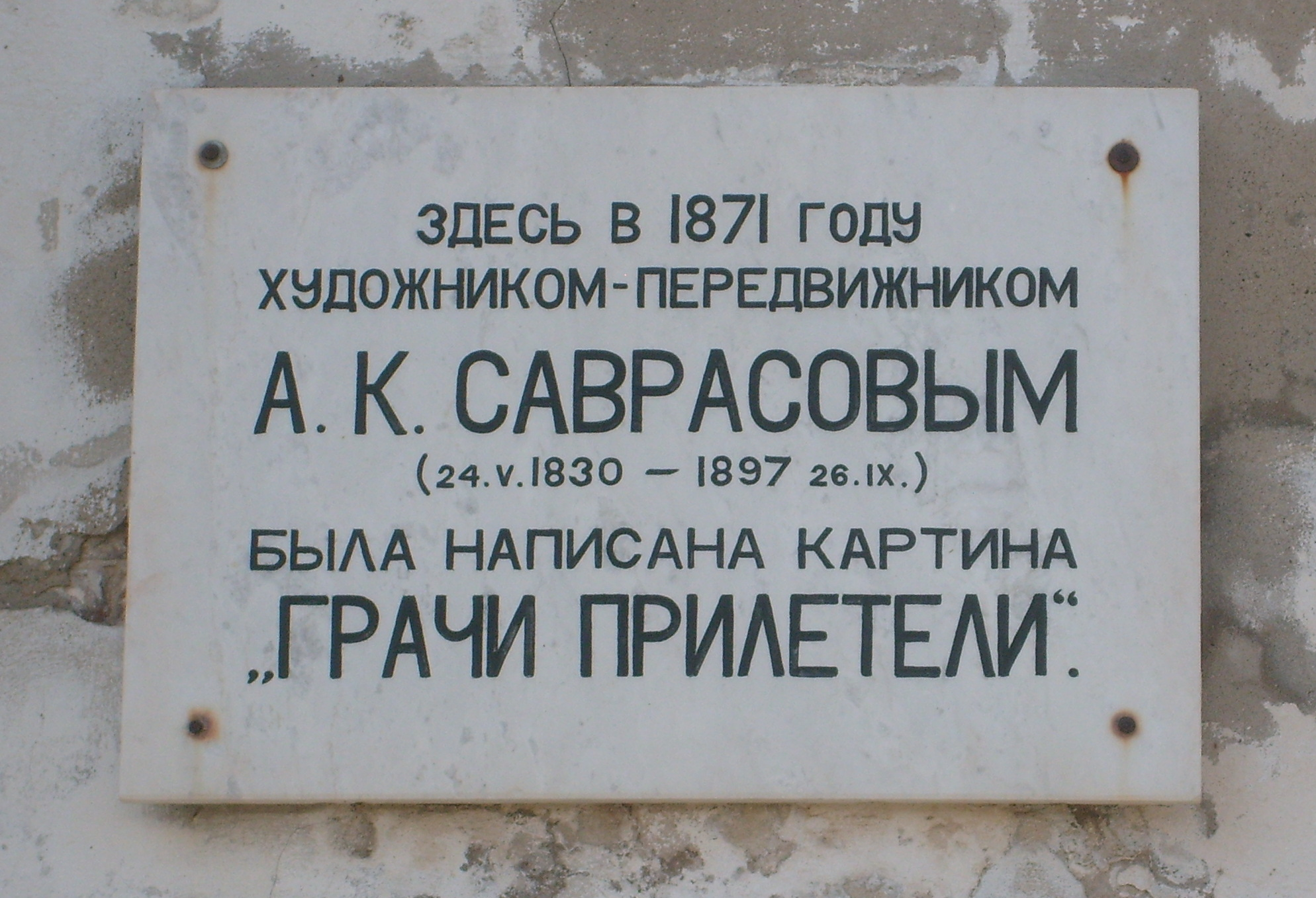
Commemorative plaque in the village of Susanino

Journalist and art historian Evgraf Konchin expressed another version. No changes in content have been made. According to the staff of the local museum, there used to be a two- or three-storey house where the family of the hatmaker Chichagov lived in the place depicted in the painting. Therefore, it is likely that Savrasov painted his sketch from the balcony of this house or standing in front of one of its windows. Konchin suggested that Savrasov may have met Chichagov in Kostroma and then travelled with him to Molvitino to see the places associated with the life and work of Ivan Susanin. Local historian Nikolai Zontikov considered this version more plausible. Savrasov would hardly have travelled alone to such a remote place without acquaintances. However, it is unlikely that the purpose of this trip was to see Susanin's places, which were not in Molvitin, but in the area of the village of Domnino, the village of Derevenki and the Isupovsky bog.

Very little is known about the details of Savrasov's work in Molvitin. The first biographer of the artist - the music critic Alexander Razmadze, who wrote under the pseudonym of A. Solmonov - described Savrasov's work in an essay published in 1894 as follows: "Having started the painting in the early morning, the artist finished it by evening, he wrote it without taking his eyes off, as if in ecstasy ... wrote, struck from the morning by the vivid impression of spring, yesterday as if it had not yet come, today descended to the ground and embraced its revitalising embrace of all nature." According to art historian Faina Maltseva, this description can be attributed to the work on preliminary sketches, but not to the painting itself, which was painted later. She noted that "the unexplored biography of the artist has given rise to contradictory, almost legendary information concerning the creation of the famous painting."

After creating sketches, Savrasov worked on the painting in Yaroslavl. He then finalised the composition in Moscow, where he returned with his family in early May. The canvas was titled Here Came the Rooks by the artist.

=== After creation ===
During the summer of 1871, Pavel Tretyakov visited Savrasov to view his painting The Rooks have Returned, which was already completed at the time. Having seen the canvas, he called it a first-class thing and expressed his desire to buy it, offering the artist 600 rubles, a considerable sum for that era. Savrasov agreed, and the painting became Tretyakov's property. Sometimes the sum of 500 rubles is mentioned. For example, the artist Pavel Chistyakov reported in a letter to Vasily Polenov, "I heard that Savrasov sold his joke, however gifted, for 500 rubles. I rejoice, there are connoisseurs, it must be."

The canvas The Rooks Have Returned was exhibited at the Moscow Society of Art Lovers exhibition in autumn 1871. In a review published in the 28 October 1871 issue of Moskovskiye Vedomosti, critic Vladimir Chuiko (published under the pseudonym V. V.) paid special attention to two landscapes presented at the exhibition: Rooks by Alexei Savrasov and Thaw by Fyodor Vasilyev. Chuiko expressed a preference for Thaw. In "Rooks", however, Chuiko did not even see her spring motif, writing: "You seem to feel all the dampness and barrenness of the past winter, but in spite of the rooks that have flown in, there is no invigorating premonition of the coming spring, except for one outward sign."

The title of the painting was The Rooks Have Returned! (present title with an exclamation mark). At the end of 1871, the painting was presented to the public at the 1st exhibition of the Society for Travelling Art Exhibitions, which opened on 28 November in Saint Petersburg. Savrasov also submitted another landscape painting titled Forest Road (current title - Road In A Forest, 1871, 138.5 × 109.5 cm, State Russian Museum). The exhibition showcased paintings by Lev Kamenev, Sergei Ammosov, and Vladimir Ammon, as well as works by renowned landscape artists such as Alexei Bogolyubov, Mikhail Klodt, and Ivan Shishkin from Moscow. No changes in content were made. The exhibition showcased paintings by Lev Kamenev, Sergei Ammosov, and Vladimir Ammon, as well as works by renowned landscape artists such as Alexei Bogolyubov, Mikhail Clodt, and Ivan Shishkin from Moscow. In a letter to Fyodor Vasilyev dated 6 December 1871, artist Ivan Kramskoi wrote about the landscapes on display at the exhibition: "Savrasov's landscape The Rooks Have Returned is the best, and it is really beautiful." According to Kramskoy, in other landscapes "there are trees, water and even air, but the soul is only in the Rooks." In an article about the exhibition published in the 8 December 1871 issue of the Sankt-Peterburgskie Vedomosti, art critic Vladimir Stasov praised Savrasov's painting and ranked it among the best of the landscapes presented at the exhibition. In the review article "The First Russian Travelling Art Exhibition", published in the December 1871 issue of the magazine Otechestvennye Zapiski, the writer and critic Mikhail Saltykov-Shchedrin did not pay much attention to landscapes, but mentioned "the charming painting The Rooks Have Returned by Mr Savrasov."

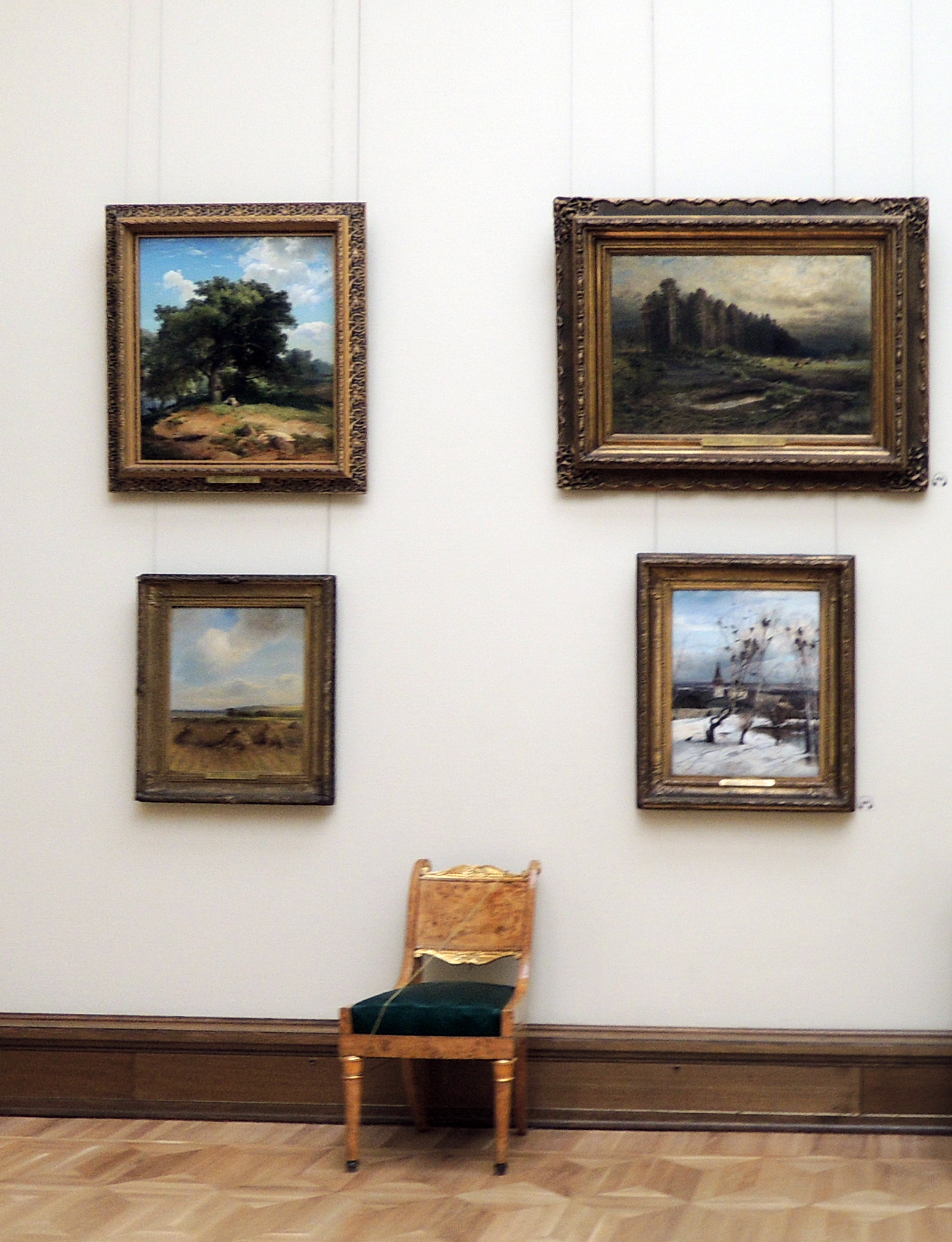
In the exposition of the Tretyakov Gallery

The Tsar's family also wanted to add Savrasov's landscape painting The Rooks Have Returned to their collection. Soon after the opening of the First Travelling Exhibition, Empress Maria Alexandrovna ordered the artist to create a replica of the painting. Savrasov completed this first author's replica of The Rooks in January 1872. It was this replica, and not the canvas from Tretyakov's collection, that was sent to the World's Fair in Vienna in 1873. It was exhibited alongside several other works that represent the successes of Russian painting in the last decade. These include Nikolai Ge's painting Peter the Great Interrogating the Tsarevich Alexei Petrovich at Peterhof, Vasily Perov's Hunters at Rest and Fisherman, Ilya Repin's Barge Haulers on the Volga, Henryk Siemiradzki's Christ and Sinner, and others.

In 1878, five years after the exhibition in Vienna, the painting The Rooks Have Returned from Tretyakov's collection was displayed at the World's Fair in Paris. It was also exhibited at the 1872 Moscow Society of Art Lovers and 1873 Academy of Arts exhibitions. The painting was exhibited in 1947 as part of the personal exhibition 'Landscape in Russian Painting of the Second Half of the 19th Century' at the Central House of Art Workers in Moscow. The exhibition was held to commemorate the 50th anniversary of Savrasov's death. The canvas was exhibited in 1963 at the State Russian Museum exhibit of Savrasov's works in Leningrad, and in 1971 it was included in the reconstruction of the First Travelling Exhibition at the State Tretyakov Gallery in Moscow. It also visited Kyiv, Leningrad, Minsk and Moscow as part of the 1971–1972 exhibition 'Landscape Painting of Peredvizhniki'. In 1980, the painting was exhibited in an extended exhibition of Savrasov's works at the Tretyakov Gallery, which was dedicated to the 150th anniversary of the artist's birth. In 2005-2006, it was also displayed at an exhibition in the Engineering Building of the Tretyakov Gallery, which was dedicated to the 175th anniversary of Savrasov's birth.

== Description ==
The painting's foreground features birch trees growing in the back of the churchyard. Among them, a gnarled tree with a dry stump sticking out to the left draws attention. Rooks fly around the birches, while some birds sit on branches near already built nests. The snow on the ground is thawing, indicating the onset of spring. The asymmetrical arrangement of the trees "reinforces the impression of the bustling movement of the rooks flying around the nests." The depiction of rooks deviates somewhat from realism. The figures of the birds are larger than their actual size and their drawing appears approximate and even naive. In this, however, "the character of these pretty messengers of spring is faithfully conveyed," and it is probable that "if their figures were immaculately faithful anatomically, carefully drawn, doubtless the picture would lose much of its charm."

The composition is based on the central group of birches. The bent branches of the side trees balance the central group on the right and left, with their trunks partially cut off by the edges of the canvas. The soft light from the slanting rays of the spring sun falls from right to left, forming light shadows of the birches on the still white, but already slightly darkened snow. Behind the trees, there is a fence, and behind it, the roofs of wooden buildings can be seen. The fence line runs in the background across the entire width of the painting, emphasizing the horizontal extent of the landscape. Behind the wooden buildings lies an old five-domed church with a tent-type bell tower. Further to the horizon, flat fields stretch through which the river flows. The river is apparently the Volozhnitsa (or Volzhnitsa), which usually overflows in spring and flows into the Shacha north-west of Susanino. The distant plans depicted in the painting give the landscape a sense of spatiality.

Local historian Nikolai Zontikov notes that Savrasov painted the Church of the Resurrection from the north-east, where the highest point of Molvitin (Susanin) is located. This is the only angle from which the church could appear to be in a lowland, and it was from there that one could see the flooded Volozhnitsa. Zontikov notes that "from this point of view the bell tower should be on the right side of the temple, and moreover, most of it should be closed by the temple building." Furthermore, the artist portrayed the bell tower as being slightly taller in comparison to the temple than it is in reality. Additionally, the distance between the bell tower and the temple was reduced. These alterations were made due to Savrasov's creative approach. As he was not merely a copyist, he sometimes deviated from the precise depiction of objects in his works. Art historian Faina Maltseva observed differences between the church depicted in the painting and the Church of the Resurrection. Specifically, the artist did not include the zakomars present in the actual church. She believed that when working on the final version of the painting Savrasov used a collective image based on "creative reinterpretation of some specific impressions of typical old churches he had seen, including the church of the Resurrection of Christ in Molvitinskaya, the example of which at the last stage could become the closest and most vivid." Savrasov subtly and respectfully painted the image of the old church, conveying a sense of admiration for the monument of rural architecture and its builders.

Fragments of the painting The Rooks Have Returned

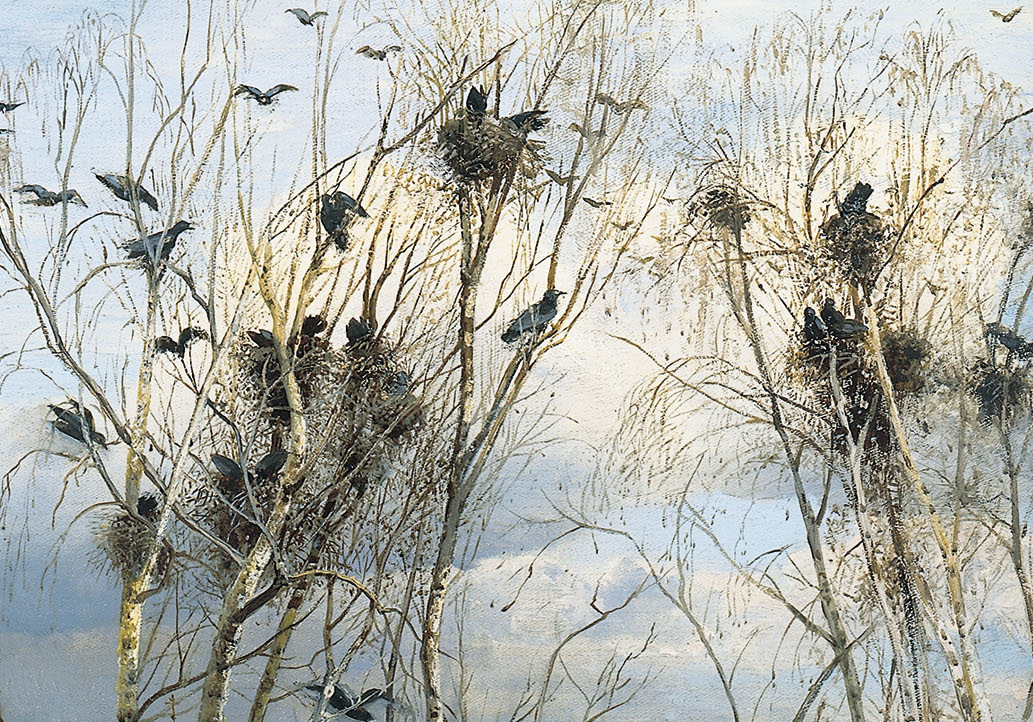
The trees and the rooks

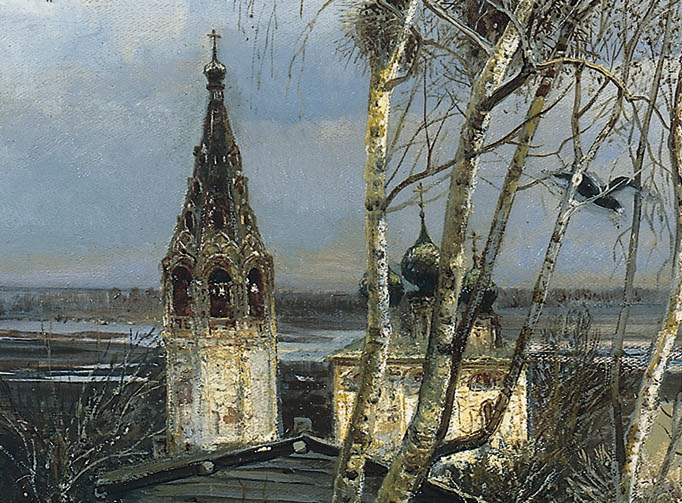
The church and bell tower

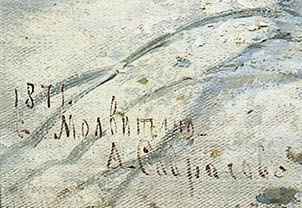
A.K. Savrasov's signature

To enhance the spatial sound of the image, Savrasov slightly altered the perspective. The foreground of the painting is depicted in a way that creates the impression that the artist is close to the ground. However, at this perspective, the horizon would have to be quite low. In the painting, the horizon is depicted approximately in the middle of the canvas, at the level of the church spires. Savrasov employed a similar technique in some of his other works, such as the earlier painting 'The Steppe in the Daytime' (1852), to better depict the plains that hold significant semantic and figurative importance in the painting. According to art historian Nikolai Novouspensky, "the composition of the painting, its rhythmic and colour structure are complex and varied". The canvas can be divided into three horizontal sections, each painted in a distinct colour tonality. The upper section, which covers approximately half of the canvas, depicts a light sky dominated by cold blue tones. The lower belt, which occupies about a third of the canvas, depicts light snow in greyish-white tones. The middle belt, which covers the space from the fence to the distant fields, is relatively narrow and painted in brown and blue tones. In this way, "the darkest part of the land and the buildings seem to float in a light and bright medium, contributing to the impression of airiness of the whole landscape."

The coherence and cohesion of the landscape's elements are achieved by the artist through a well-chosen composition and the use of painting techniques, such as chiaroscuro. The composition of the canvas gives an impression of upward striving, achieved by "young slender birch trees reaching upwards and the hipped bell tower of the old white stone church." Through the carefully developed plastic characterisation of the landscape elements, the artist manages to convey the sadness of the passing winter and the joy of the reawakening of nature in spring. This is achieved through the overall light colouring of the painting, including the blue of the sky, the warm light brownish thaw in the fields and the cold blue-grey tones of the melting snow, which is painted in many shades of lilac, pink and blue. The snow in the foreground is depicted as darkened, loose, and settled, while the snow by the fence is sunlit and coloured with a "soft pinkish goldenness." The artist employs a restrained but light-saturated colour scheme to subtly express emotionality throughout the painting.

When creating the painting, Savrasov employed a complex painting technique that involved using coloured ground, multiple layers of different colours and textures, multi-directional strokes, as well as glaze and reflexes. In particular, the development of the sky is innovative, with traces of brushstrokes visible all over its surface, and "the character and direction of the strokes are constantly changing, creating an impression of lightness and awe in the painting." At the same time, according to Faina Maltseva, "the whole technique of execution recedes to the harmony of the whole, which is caused not so much by the power of professional skill in reproducing it as by the power of direct feeling, which so sublimely perceives this phenomenon of nature and makes us perceive it in this way."

== Studies, sketches, repetitions and variations ==
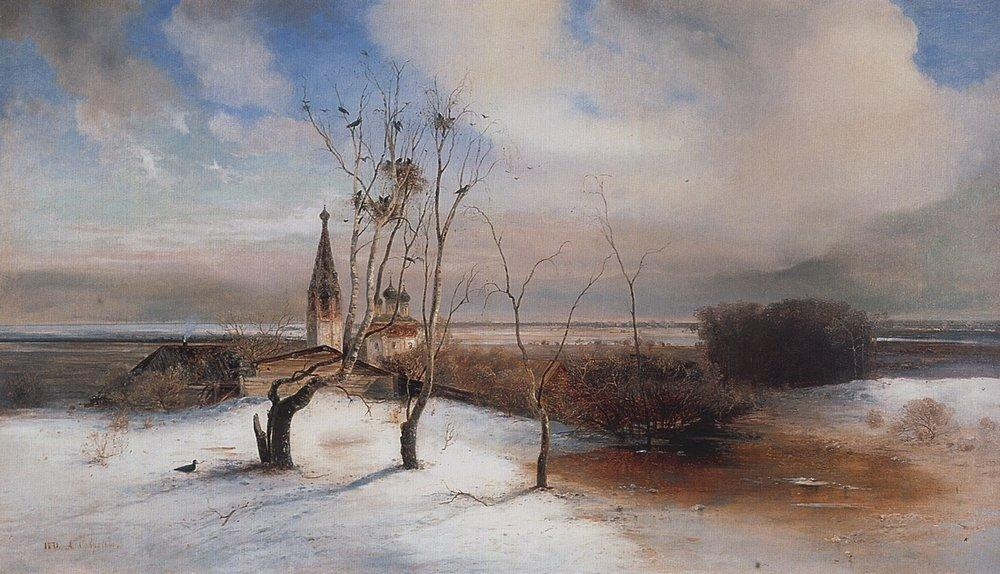
Spring. The Rooks Have Returned (1872, private collection)

Very little is known about the preparatory work Savrasov did before painting The Rooks. Art historian Nikolai Novouspensky has noted that we know almost nothing "about the nurturing, maturing and formation of the image of the painting", so "much belongs to the realm of conjecture." Two sketches executed on mahogany were presented at the exhibition dedicated to the 50th anniversary of Savrasov's death, which took place in Moscow in 1947. One of them, measuring 22.5 × 13.5 cm, belonged to the collector V. K. Dmakhovsky. According to art historian Faina Maltseva, this sketch was painted directly from life and was likely used to paint the central part of the painting The Rooks Have Returned. Maltseva observed similarities between the composition of the study and the main painting, despite some significant differences. One notable difference was the hot brown-gold colour of the study, which appeared to have been painted on a bright sunny day. The sketch was signed at the bottom: «A. Savrasov. Molvitino» Russian: «А. Саврасовъ. Молвитино». In a 1967 monograph, Nikolai Novouspensky mentioned that the location of the study was unknown after the death of V. K. Dmakhovsky.

Another sketch measuring 30.2 × 14.8 cm was shown at the 1947 exhibition and belonged to the collector N.V. Ilyin. It did not bear a definite resemblance to the painting. During the preparation for the exhibition, the artist and art historian Igor Grabar suggested that this sketch could have been painted by Savrasov later, from memory. According to Grabar, "you cannot make a painting from such a sketch. It is rather a sketch from memory. I saw the bell tower and then came home and did something from memory." The date of this sketch is currently attributed to the 1880s. Additionally, there is a sketch for the painting The Rooks Have Returned, created in oil on wood and dated 1871. This sketch is held in the Penza Regional Picture Gallery named after K.A. Savitsky, having been acquired by the gallery in 1984.

The Tretyakov Gallery possesses a sketch variant from the early 1870s titled Landscape with Church and Bell Tower (tinted paper on cardboard, black chalk and graphite pencil, sauce and whiting, wet brush, 49.7 × 33.3 cm, inv. 30958), which was acquired from Savrasov's direct heirs from his first marriage. This sketch, depicting 'a modest single-domed church with a barely hinted ceiling and a tall hipped bell tower', shows some details of the composition of the painting, but a significant amount of detail is missing - in particular, there are no buildings in the vicinity of the church. Based on Faina Maltseva's analysis, this sketch variant may have been created by the artist during the early stages of work on the painting, possibly in the rural village of Kresty near Yaroslavl, where a church with similar architecture was located.

As previously mentioned, Savrasov executed the first author's repetition of the painting The Rooks Have Returned in early 1872 at the request of Empress Maria Alexandrovna. This painting was sent to the World's Fair in Vienna, but its current whereabouts are unknown. Another repetition, created in 1879 (or possibly 1889 according to other sources), is currently held in the Nizhny Novgorod State Art Museum. The painting is on canvas, in oil, and measures 62 × 49.5 cm.

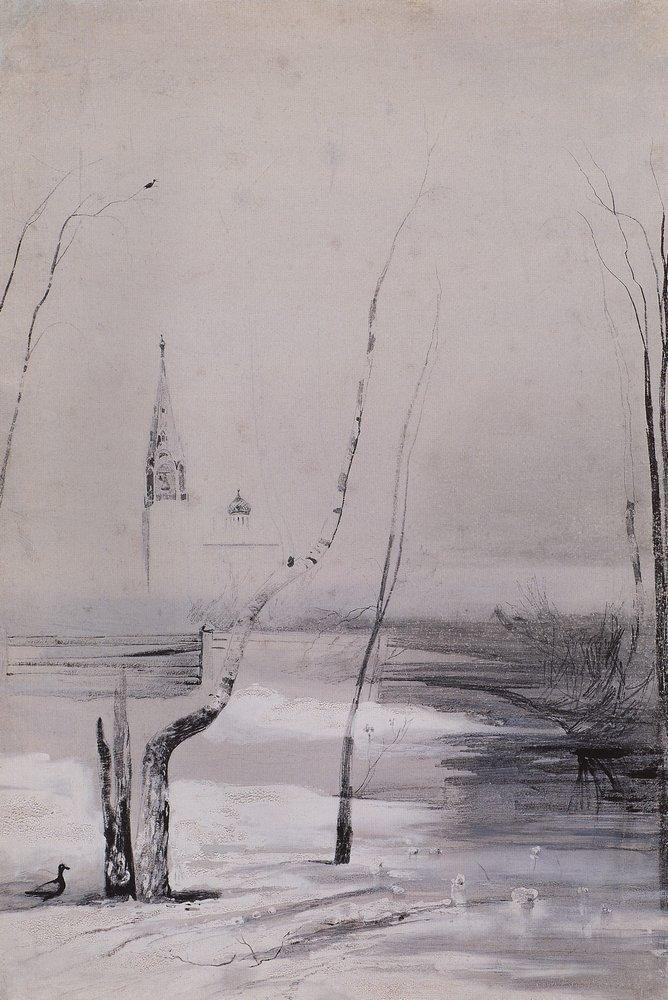
Landscape with a Church and Bell Tower (early 1870s, State Tretyakov Gallery)

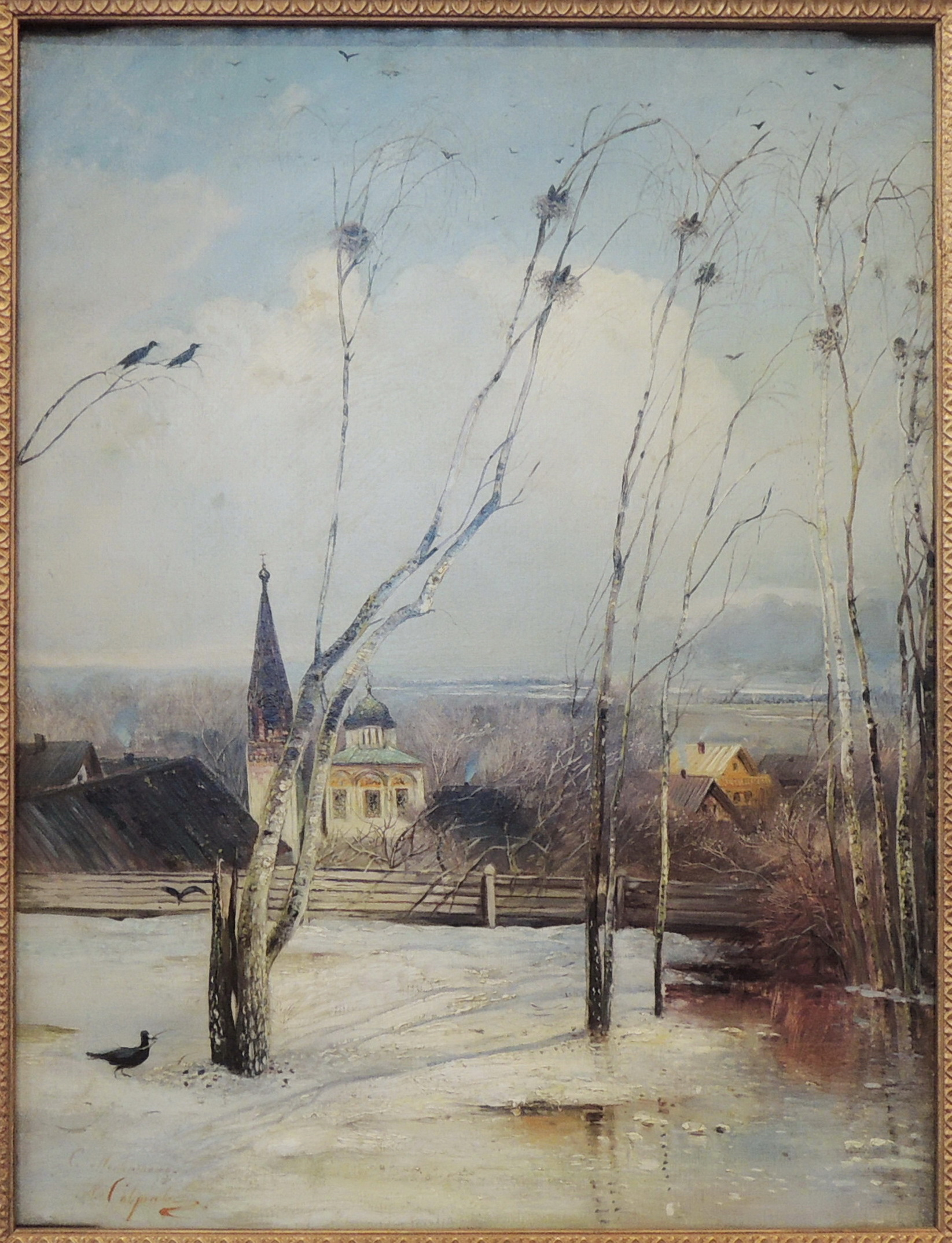
The Rooks Have Returned (State Russian Museum)

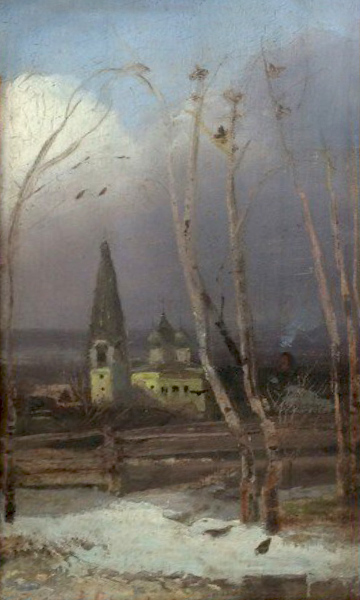
The Rooks Have Returned (study, 1871, Penza Regional Art Gallery named after K.A. Savitsky)

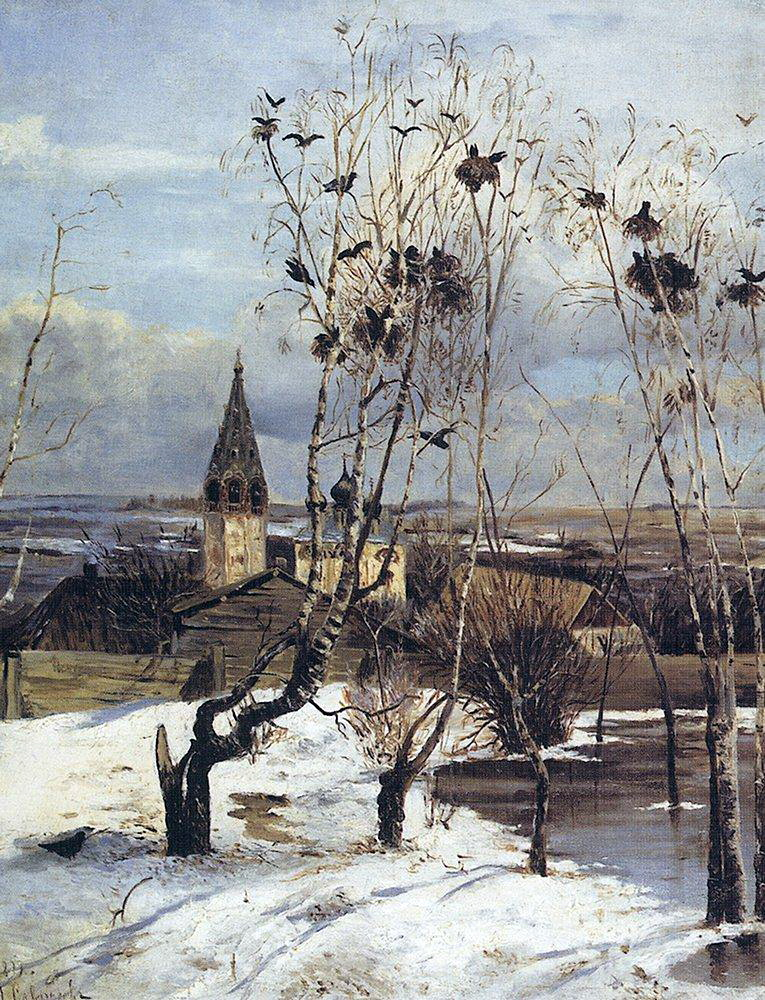
The Rooks Have Returned (1879 or 1889, Nizhny Novgorod State Art Museum)

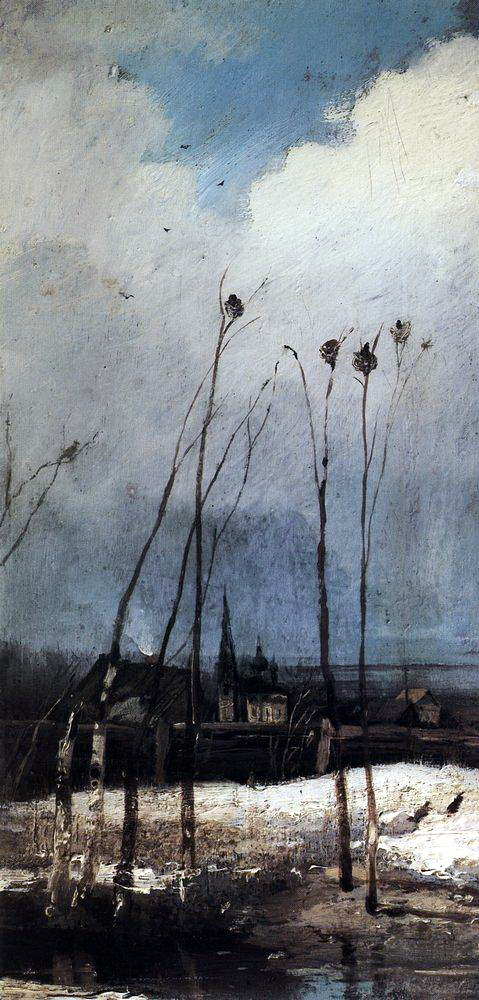
The Rooks Have Returned (study, 1880s)

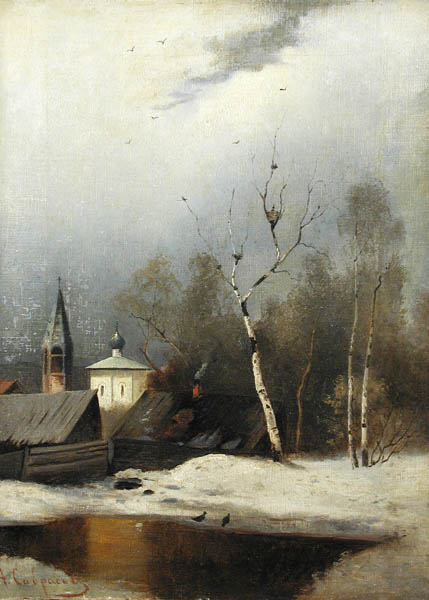
Early Spring (1880s–1890s, National Art Museum of the Republic of Belarus)

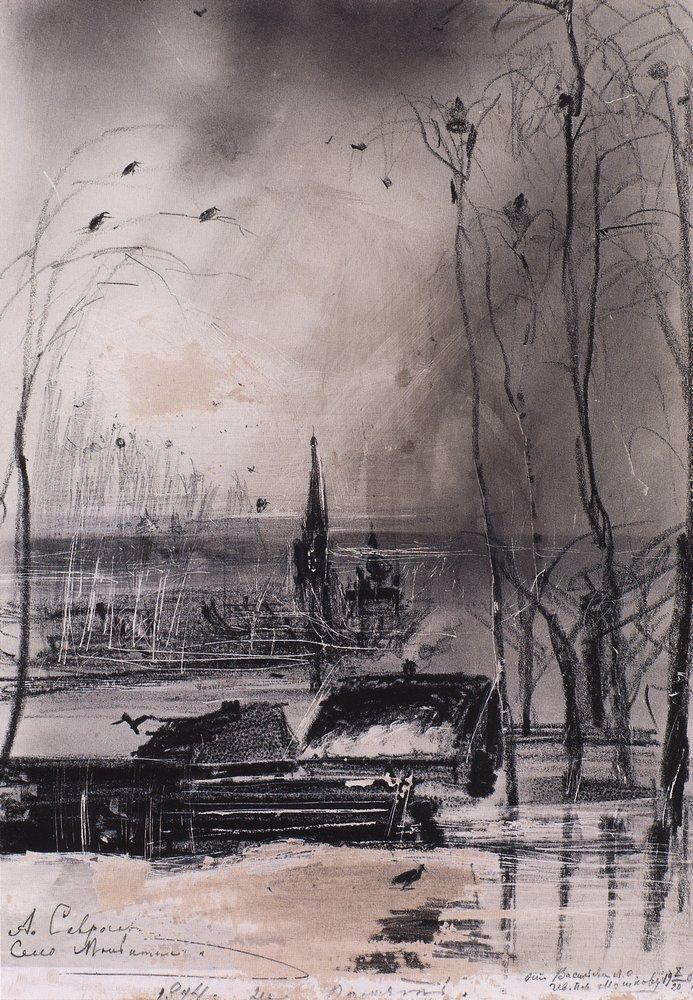
The Rooks Have Returned. Landscape with a Church (1894, State Tretyakov Gallery)

The artist created multiple works featuring variations of the motif and composition of the painting The Rooks Have Returned. One such variation executed in a horizontal format is titled Spring. The Rooks Have Returned (canvas, oil, 67 × 117 cm, private collection, Moscow), which was included in the catalogue of Savrasov's 2005 solo exhibition. The Tretyakov Gallery has a replica with the same title from 1894 (tinted ground paper, Italian pencil, sauce, eraser, scraping, 33 × 23 cm, inventory no. 27192). The State Russian Museum has a version of the painting titled Early Spring painted in the 1880s–1890s (oil on canvas, 51.3 × 37.8 cm, Inventory No. Zh-4117, donated to the museum in 1948 by M.M. Muzalevsky). A similar version is also held at the National Art Museum of Belarus (1880–1890s, oil on canvas, 51 × 38 cm, inv. RZh-627).

== Reviews ==
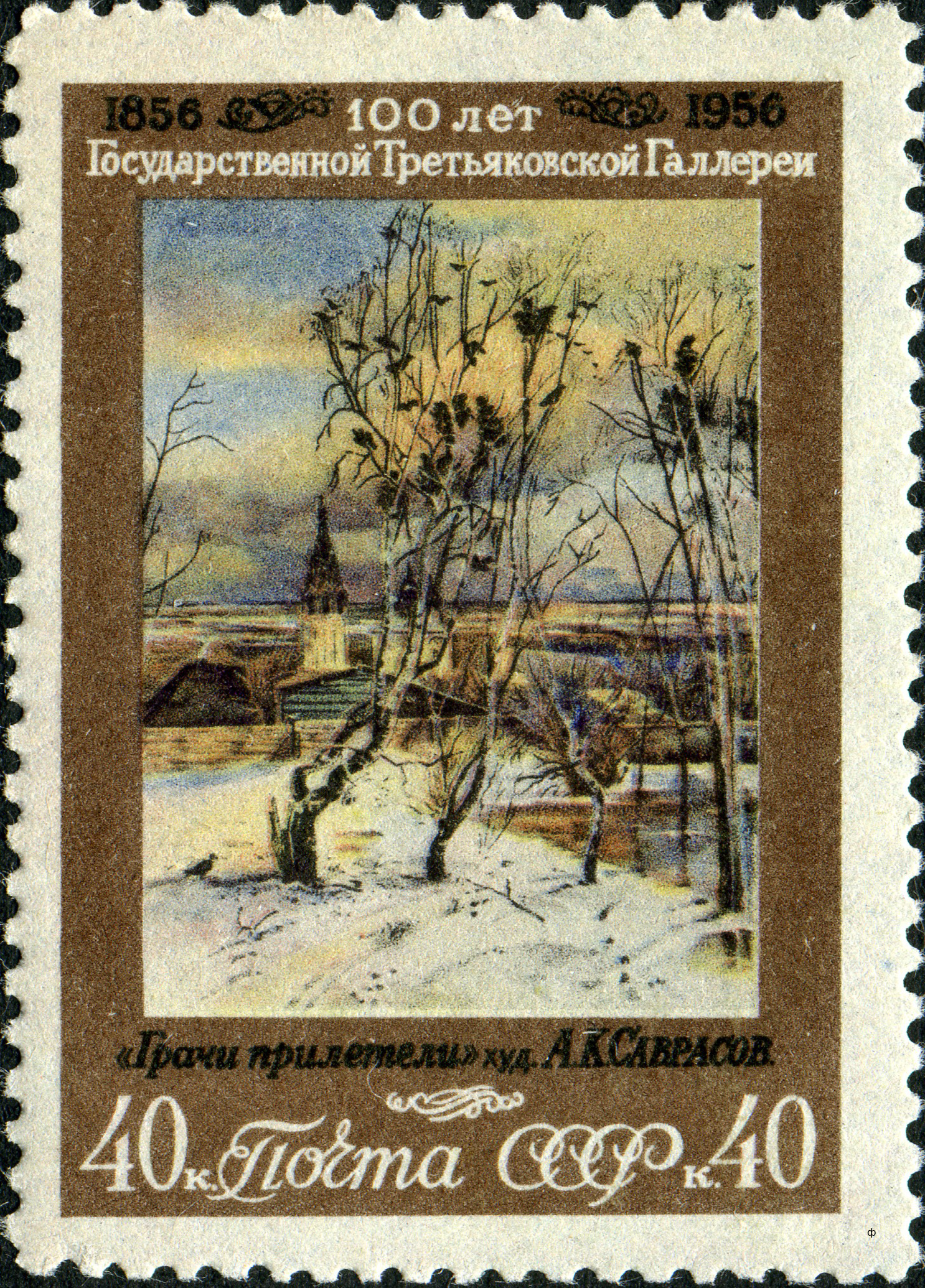
The painting The Rooks Have Returned on a 1956 USSR postage stamp

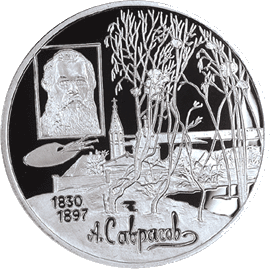
Reverse of a commemorative 2 rouble coin issued by the Central Bank of Russia to mark the 100th anniversary of the death of Alexei Savrasov in 1997. The coin features a portrait of the artist against a background of a fragment of his painting The Rooks Have Returned.

In an article discussing the 1st travelling exhibition, published in the Sankt-Peterburgskie Vedomosti on 8 December 1871, art critic Vladimir Stasov ranked The Rooks as one of the best landscapes presented at the exhibition. Stasov also noted that it was "probably the best and most original painting by Mr. Savrasov." Speaking of the artist's skill in depicting trees, birds, the landscape and the bell tower, Stasov exclaimed: "How wonderful it all is, how you can hear winter here, its fresh breath!" Art historian Nikolai Novouspensky subsequently noted that Stasov's description was not entirely accurate, as it appeared to have been made from memory - in particular, the critic failed to see that Savrasov's entire canvas is imbued with a sense of the coming of spring. Nevertheless, according to Novouspensky, Stasov was basically right - he correctly sensed the animated nature that the artist was depicting, and the painting was full of feeling and mood.

In his article "On the Death of A.K. Savrasov", published on 4 October 1897 in Russkie Vedomosti, artist Isaac Levitan wrote that "in Savrasov emerged lyricism in landscape painting and boundless love for his native land". As an example, Levitan cited the painting The Rooks Have Returned, which he considered to be one of the best in Savrasov's oeuvre. Describing its subject, Levitan wrote: "The outskirts of a remote town, an old church, a shabby fence, a field, melting snow and in the foreground a few birch trees on which the arriving rooks have settled - that's all. What simplicity! But behind this simplicity you feel the soft, good soul of the artist, to whom all this is dear and close to his heart..."

In his book "History of Russian Painting in the 19th century", artist and critic Alexandre Benois described the painting The Rooks Have Returned as remarkable and meaningful. He argued that Alexei Savrasov had not created anything as outstanding before or after it. According to him, this solitary painting by Savrasov must be considered "a phenomenal, inexplicable case" - both "in terms of its theme, its wonderful poetic mood" and "in terms of the simplicity, directness of execution and even partly in terms of the beauty of the colours". Benois wrote that Savrasov's Rooks was "a wonderful picture, so poetic, at the same time wistful and joyful, truly spring"; in this sense he compared it to the introduction to Nikolai Rimsky-Korsakov's opera The Snow Maiden.

In his monograph on Savrasov, art historian Alexei Fedorov-Davydov also noted that The Rooks Have Returned is not an accidental success, but the best painting among similar works by the artist. He described The Rooks as an outstanding work of art that has "not only artistic, but also broader general cultural significance." He noted that this canvas represents an important stage in the development of Russian landscape painting and "at the same time expresses the conquests in the development of the general culture of the people." Fyodorov-Davydov wrote that the landscape The Rooks Have Returned is immediately perceived in the simplicity of its motif, and then unfolds step by step in a pictorial narrative, but not because of any external fabulism, but because of the artist's desire to convey the life of nature. Comparing The Rooks with Fyodor Vasilyev's Thaw, which appeared in the same year, Fedorov-Davydov noted the lyricism of both paintings, but saw the difference between them in the fact that Savrasov's lyricism corresponds to a clear and precise narrative, while Vasilyev's lyricism has a more general, yet direct character.

The critic and musicologist Boris Asafyev (literary pseudonym - Igor Glebov) wrote that the painting The Rooks Have Returned became "a symbol of artistic renewal of the sphere of Russian landscape for 'far ahead'" and that with this work Savrasov "opened a new sense of spring and springtime." Comparing Savrasov's Rooks with Tchaikovsky's The Seasons, Asafiev noted that the appearance of such a landscape testified to the dawn of a time when "Russian painting felt not the outward appearance - very modest - of Russian nature, but its melody, the soul of the landscape". At the same time, says Asafiev, "Russian music also heard the special picturesqueness of the shimmering, the transitions from one season to another: Russian sound painting was born, the music of landscape moods and the music of the singing forces of nature."

Art historian Faina Maltseva wrote that in the painting The Rooks Have Returned Savrasov managed to create "a multidimensional and poetic image of the Russian spring, close to human life not externally but internally". According to her, this is "the secret of the charm of Savrasov's art, its eternally alive beginning." Maltseva noted that Savrasov's Rooks were not fully appreciated when it appeared in the early 1870s, but by the 1890s this painting, which is "a work with a pronounced aesthetic concept, affirming the lyrical experience of nature in landscape painting", became "a banner in the art of Savrasov's students." This shows that this painting was far ahead of its time and managed to stand out from all the other landscapes shown in the first travelling exhibition.

== Bibliography ==
- Асафьев, Б.В. (1955). Избранные труды [Selected works] (in Russian). Vol. 4: Избранные работы о русской музыкальной культуре и зарубежной музыке. Moscow: Издательство Академии наук СССР.
- Бенуа, А.Н. (1995). История русской живописи в XIX веке [History of Russian painting in the 19th century] (in Russian). Moscow: Республика. ISBN 5-250-02524-2.
- Гомберг-Вержбинская, Э.П. (1970). Передвижники [Peredvizhniki] (in Russian). Leningrad: Искусство.
- Горина, Т.Н. (1965). Алексей Кондратьевич Саврасов [Alexei Kondratyevich Savrasov] (in Russian). Moscow: Советский художник.
- Добровольский, О.М. (2001). Саврасов [Savrasov]. Мастера (in Russian). Moscow: Терра — Книжный клуб. ISBN 5-300-02986-6.
- Зонтиков, Н.А. (1999). "Символ России. О храме, изображённом на картине А. К. Саврасова «Грачи прилетели»" [Symbol of Russia. About the temple depicted in the painting A.К. Savrasov's "The Rooks Have Returned"] (PDF). Костромская Земля (in Russian) (4). Kostroma: 7–33. Archived from the original (PDF) on 2017-08-14.
- Кончин, Е.В. (1988). "Сусанино. Март" [Susanino. March]. Смена (in Russian) (6 (1388)): 24–25.
- Королёва, С. (2010). Алексей Кондратьевич Саврасов [Alexei Kondratyevich Savrasov]. Великие художники (in Russian). Vol. 22. Moscow: Директ-Медиа and Комсомольская правда. ISBN 978-5-87107-195-3.
- Лапунова, Н.Ф. (1969). Алексей Кондратьевич Саврасов [Alexei Kondratyevich Savrasov]. Народная библиотечка по искусству (in Russian). Leningrad: Художник РСФСР.
- Левитан, И.И. (1956). Фёдоров-Давыдов, А.А. (ed.). Письма, документы, воспоминания [Letters, documents, memories] (in Russian). Moscow: Искусство.
- Мальцева, Ф.С. (1977). Алексей Кондратьевич Саврасов. Жизнь и творчество [Alexei Kondratyevich Savrasov. Life and creative work] (in Russian). Moscow: Искусство.
- Мальцева, Ф.С. (1989). Алексей Кондратьевич Саврасов [Alexei Kondratyevich Savrasov]. Русские живописцы XIX века (in Russian). Moscow: Художник РСФСР. ISBN 5-7370-0175-X.
- Мальцева, Ф.С. (1999). Мастера русского пейзажа. Вторая половина XIX века. Часть 1 [Masters of Russian landscape. The second half of the 19th century. Part 1] (in Russian). Moscow: Искусство. ISBN 5-210-01407-X.
- Новоуспенский, Н.Н. (1967). Алексей Кондратьевич Саврасов. Moscow: Искусство.
- Осокин, В.Н. (1961). Рассказы о писателях и художниках-костромичах [Stories about writers and artists of Kostroma] (in Russian). Kostroma: Костромское книжное издательство.
- Орлова, Е. (2014). Алексей Кондратьевич Саврасов [Alexei Kondratyevich Savrasov]. Великие русские живописцы (in Russian). Moscow: Рипол-классик. ISBN 978-5-386-06884-4.
- Пахомова, О.А. (2009). Саврасов [Savrasov] (in Russian). Moscow: Белый город. ISBN 978-5-7793-1764-1.
- Петинова, Е.Ф. (2001). Русские художники XVIII — начала XX века [Russian artists of the 18th - early 20th century] (in Russian). Saint Petersburg: Аврора. ISBN 978-5-7300-0714-7.
- Петров, В.А. (1983). А. Саврасов. Из собрания Государственной Третьяковской галереи [А. Savrasov. From the collection of the State Tretyakov Gallery] (in Russian). Moscow: Изобразительное искусство.
- Петров, В.А. (2005). Алексей Саврасов [Alexei Savrasov] (in Russian). Moscow: Белый город. ISBN 5-7793-0221-9.
- Петров, В.А. (2006). "Алексей Саврасов: правда и поэзия" [Alexei Savrasov: truth and poetry] (PDF). Третьяковская Галерея (in Russian) (1): 4–13.
- Петров, В.А.; Торстенсен, Л.А. (2005). Алексей Кондратьевич Саврасов [Alexei Kondratyevich Savrasov] (in Russian). Moscow: Сканрус. ISBN 5-93221-088-5.
- Порудоминский, В.И. (1974). И.Н. Крамской [I.N. Kramskoy] (in Russian). Moscow: Искусство.
- Салтыков-Щедрин, М.Е. (1970). "Первая русская передвижная художественная выставка" [The First Russian Travelling Art Exhibition.]. В Книге: Собрание Сочинений В 20 Томах, Том 9 (in Russian). Художественная литература: 225–233.
- Солмонов, А. (1894). "А. К. Саврасов. Биографический очерк" [А. К. Savrasov. Biographical sketch.]. В Книге: Художественный Альбом Рисунков. А. К. Саврасов (in Russian). Типография С. В. Кульженко: 5–8.
- Стасов, В.В. (1950). Избранное: живопись, скульптура, графика [Selected: painting, sculpture, graphics] (in Russian). Vol. 1 — Русское искусство. Moscow: Искусство.
- Стернин, Г.Ю. (1997). Художественная жизнь России второй половины XIX века: 70—80-е годы [Art life in Russia in the second half of the 19th century: 70-80s] (in Russian). Moscow: Наука.
- Фёдоров-Давыдов, А.А. (1950). Алексей Кондратьевич Саврасов. 1830—1897. Жизнь и творчество [Alexei Kondratyevich Savrasov. 1830-1897. Life and creative work] (in Russian). Moscow: Издательство Академии художеств СССР.
- Фёдоров-Давыдов, А.А. (1957). Саврасов [Savrasov] (in Russian). Moscow: Искусство.
- Фёдоров-Давыдов, А.А. (1986). Русский пейзаж XVIII — начала XX века [Russian landscape of the 18th - early 20th century] (in Russian). Советский художник.
- Родина, А., ed. (1998). 100 незнакомых картин из фондов Государственного Русского музея [100 unfamiliar paintings from the collections of the State Russian Museum] (in Russian). Saint Petersburg: Palace Editions.
- Брук, Я.В.; Иовлева, Л.И., eds. (2006). Государственная Третьяковская галерея — каталог собрания [State Tretyakov Gallery - collection catalogue]. Vol. 4: Живопись второй половины XIX века, книга 2, Н–Я. Moscow: Красная площадь. p. 281. ISBN 5-900743-22-5. OCLC 34340707.
- Государственный Русский музей — Живопись, XVIII — начало XX века (каталог) [State Russian Museum - Painting, 18th - early 20th century (catalogue)] (in Russian). Leningrad: Аврора and Искусство. 1980.
- Леняшин, В.А., ed. (2017). Государственный Русский музей — каталог собрания [State Russian Museum - collection catalogue] (in Russian). Vol. 7: Живопись второй половины XIX века (Н—Я). Saint Petersburg: Palace Editions. ISBN 978-3-906917-17-7.
- Коваленская, Т.М., ed. (1988). Крамской об искусстве [Kramskoy on art] (in Russian). Moscow: Изобразительное искусство. ISBN 5-85200-015-9.
- Галкина, Н.Г.; Григорьева, М.Н.; Приймак, Н.Л., eds. (1968). Письма художников Павлу Михайловичу Третьякову: 1870—1879 [Artists' letters to Pavel Mikhailovich Tretyakov: 1870-1879] (in Russian). Moscow: Искусство.
