= Golovinsky (rural locality) =

Golovinsky (Russian: Головинский; masculine), Golovinskaya (Головинская; feminine), or Golovinskoye (Головинское; neuter) is the name of several rural localities in Russia.

== Modern localities ==
=== Arkhangelsk Oblast ===
As of 2014, three rural localities in Arkhangelsk Oblast bear this name:

Arkhangelsk Oblast distribution map
Distribution of the inhabited localities called Golovinskaya in Arkhangelsk Oblast.

- Golovinskaya, Konoshsky District, Arkhangelsk Oblast, a village in Vadyinsky Selsoviet of Konoshsky District; 61°05′N 39°48′E
- Golovinskaya, Velsky District, Arkhangelsk Oblast, a village in Puysky Selsoviet of Velsky District; 61°31′N 42°29′E
- Golovinskaya, Verkhnetoyemsky District, Arkhangelsk Oblast, a village in Fedkovsky Selsoviet of Verkhnetoyemsky District; 61°59′N 45°08′E

=== Irkutsk Oblast ===
As of 2014, one rural locality in Irkutsk Oblast bears this name:

Irkutsk Oblast location map
Location of Golovinskoye in Irkutsk Oblast

- Golovinskoye, Irkutsk Oblast, a selo in Alarsky District; 53°26′N 02°40′E

=== Ivanovo Oblast ===
As of 2014, one rural locality in Ivanovo Oblast bears this name:

Ivanovo Oblast location map
Location of Golovinskaya in Ivanovo Oblast

- Golovinskaya, Ivanovo Oblast, a village in Kineshemsky District; 57°16′N 42°19′E

=== Kostroma Oblast ===
As of 2014, two rural localities in Kostroma Oblast bear this name:

Kostroma Oblast distribution map
Distribution of the inhabited localities called Golovinskoye in Kostroma Oblast.

- Golovinskoye, Severnoye Settlement, Susaninsky District, Kostroma Oblast, a village in Severnoye Settlement of Susaninsky District; 58°05′N 41°29′E
- Golovinskoye, Sokirinskoye Settlement, Susaninsky District, Kostroma Oblast, a selo in Sokirinskoye Settlement of Susaninsky District; 58°16′N 41°40′E

=== Tula Oblast ===
As of 2014, one rural locality in Tula Oblast bears this name:

- Golovinskoye, Tula Oblast, a village in Stoyanovskaya Rural Administration of Odoyevsky District

=== Vologda Oblast ===
As of 2014, three rural localities in Vologda Oblast bear this name:

- Golovinskoye, Vologda Oblast, a village in Sidorovsky Selsoviet of Gryazovetsky District
- Golovinskaya, Kharovsky District, Vologda Oblast, a village in Kharovsky Selsoviet of Kharovsky District
- Golovinskaya, Vozhegodsky District, Vologda Oblast, a village in Maryinsky Selsoviet of Vozhegodsky District

=== Yaroslavl Oblast ===
As of 2014, five rural localities in Yaroslavl Oblast bear this name:

- Golovinskoye, Bolsheselsky District, Yaroslavl Oblast, a village in Chudinovsky Rural Okrug of Bolsheselsky District
- Golovinskoye, Pereslavsky District, Yaroslavl Oblast, a village in Andrianovsky Rural Okrug of Pereslavsky District
- Golovinskoye, Rostovsky District, Yaroslavl Oblast, a village in Novo-Nikolsky Rural Okrug of Rostovsky District
- Golovinskoye, Levtsovsky Rural Okrug, Yaroslavsky District, Yaroslavl Oblast, a village in Levtsovsky Rural Okrug of Yaroslavsky District
- Golovinskoye, Pestretsovsky Rural Okrug, Yaroslavsky District, Yaroslavl Oblast, a village in Pestretsovsky Rural Okrug of Yaroslavsky District

== Alternative names ==
- Golovinsky, alternative name of Golovino, a village in Lyulpansky Rural Okrug of Medvedevsky District in the Mari El Republic; 56°55′N 47°39′E
- Golovinskaya, alternative name of Golovino, a village in Biserovsky Rural Okrug of Afanasyevsky District in Kirov Oblast; 59°10′N 53°08′E
- Golovinskoye, alternative name of Golovino, a village in Golovinskoye Settlement of Sharyinsky District in Kostroma Oblast; 58°38′N 45°42′E
- Golovinskoye, alternative name of Golovnoye, a selo in Nizhnegolovinsky Selsoviet of Lebyazhyevsky District in Kurgan Oblast; 55°19′N 66°49′E
