= Aleksei Golovin =

Aleksei Golovin may refer to:

- Aleksei Golovin (footballer)
- Aleksey Golovin (bobsleigh)
