= Golovinsky =

Golovinsky (masculine), Golovinskaya (feminine), or Golovinskoye (neuter) may refer to:

- Golovinsky (rural locality) (Golovinskaya, Golovinskoye), several rural localities in Russia
- Golovinsky District, a district in Northern Administrative Okrug of the federal city of Moscow, Russia
- Matvei Golovinski (Matvey Golovinsky, 1865–1920), Russian-French writer, journalist, and political activist

== See also ==
- Golovin (disambiguation)
- Golovino (disambiguation)
