= Golovnin (surname) =

Golovnin (Russian: Головнин) is a Russian masculine surname, its feminine counterpart is Golovnina. It may refer to

- Maria Golovnina (1980–2015), Japanese-Russian journalist
- Vasily Golovnin (1776–1831), Russian admiral

== See also ==
- Golovin (disambiguation)
