= Susanino, Kostroma Oblast =

Susanino Сусанино
- Urban-type settlement
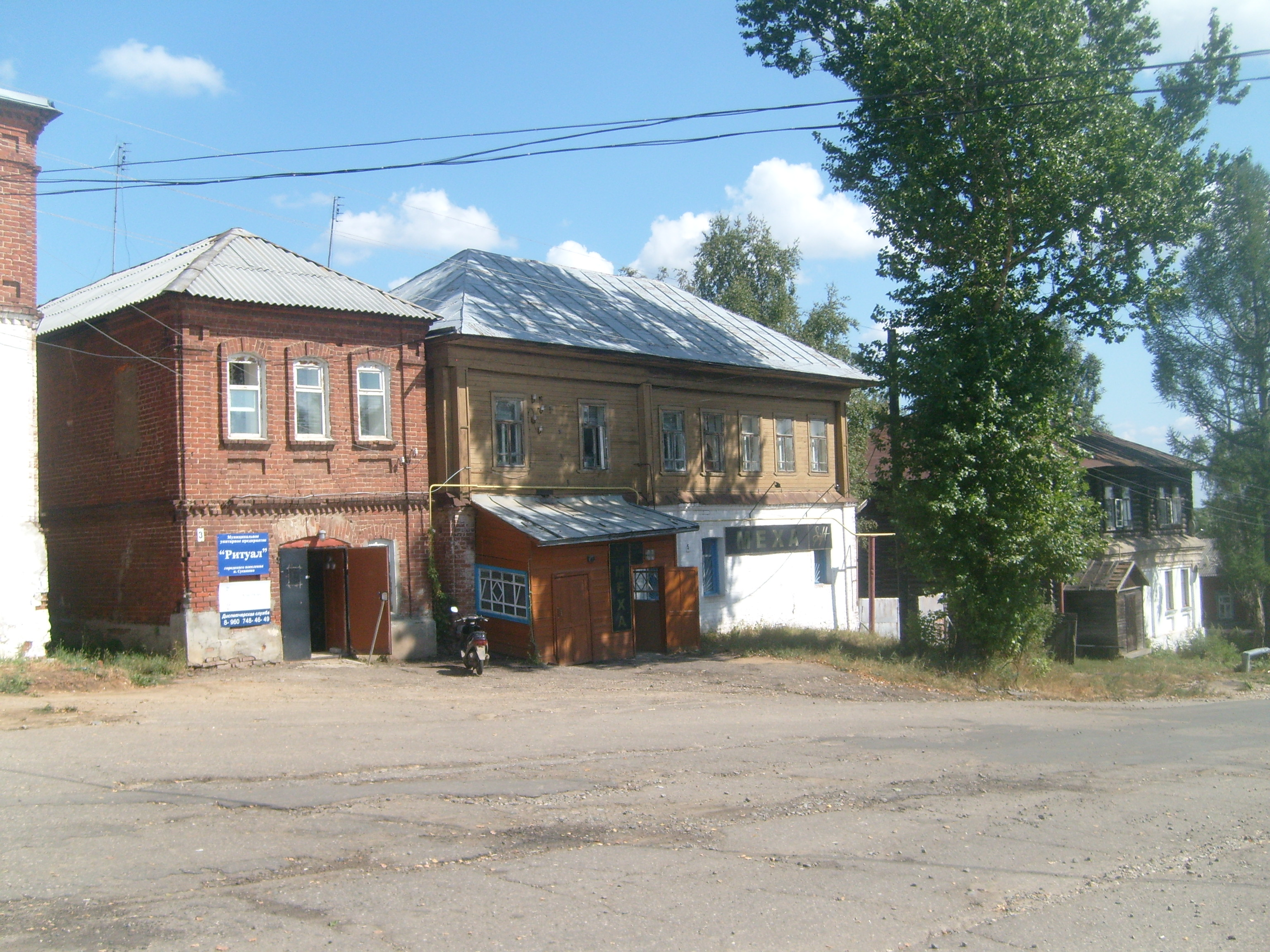
- Shops in the center of Susanino
- Interactive map of Susanino
- Location of Susanino Susanino (Kostroma Oblast)
- Coordinates: 58.1542°N 41.6081°E
- Country: Russia
- Federal subject: Kostroma Oblast
- Administrative district: Susaninsky District

Population (2010 Census)
  - Total: 3,406
  - Estimate (2025): 2,881 (−15.4%)
- Time zone: UTC+3 (MSK)
- Postal code: 157080
- OKTMO ID: 34644151051

Susanino (Russian: Суса́нино) is an urban locality (an urban-type settlement) in Susaninsky District of Kostroma Oblast, Russia. Population: 3,008 (2021 census); 3,406 (2010 census); 4,065 (2002 census); 5,289 (1989 Soviet census).
