= Golovino, Belgorod Oblast =

Golovino Головино
- Selo
- Location within Belgorod Oblast Location within Russia
- Coordinates: 50°28′N 36°26′E
- Country: Russia
- Region: Belgorod Oblast
- District: Belgorodsky District
- Time zone: UTC+3:00

Golovino (Russian: Головино) is a rural locality (a selo) in Belgorodsky District, Belgorod Oblast, Russia. The population was 837 as of 2010. There are 26 streets.

== Geography ==
Golovino is located 11 km south of Maysky (the district's administrative centre) by road. Politotdelsky is the nearest rural locality.
