= Golovino, Sobinsky District, Vladimir Oblast =

Golovino Головино
- Village
- Location within Vladimir Oblast Location within Russia
- Coordinates: 55°50′N 40°13′E
- Country: Russia
- Region: Vladimir Oblast
- District: Sobinsky District
- Time zone: UTC+3:00

Golovino (Russian: Головино) is a rural locality (a village) in Bereznikovskoye Rural Settlement, Sobinsky District, Vladimir Oblast, Russia. The population was 3 as of 2010.

== Geography ==
The village is located 9 km south-east from Berezniki, 25 km south-east from Sobinka.
