= Golovino, Sudogodsky District, Vladimir Oblast =

Golovino Головино
- Village
- Location within Vladimir Oblast Location within Russia
- Coordinates: 55°57′N 40°26′E
- Country: Russia
- Region: Vladimir Oblast
- District: Sudogodsky District
- Time zone: UTC+3:00

Golovino (Russian: Головино) is a rural locality (a village) and the administrative center of Golovinskoye Rural Settlement, Sudogodsky District, Vladimir Oblast, Russia. The population was 4,408 as of 2010. There are 24 streets.

== Geography ==
Golovino is located 31 km west of Sudogda (the district's administrative centre) by road. Kamenets is the nearest rural locality.
