= Fyodor Vasilyev =

Russian painter (1850–1873)

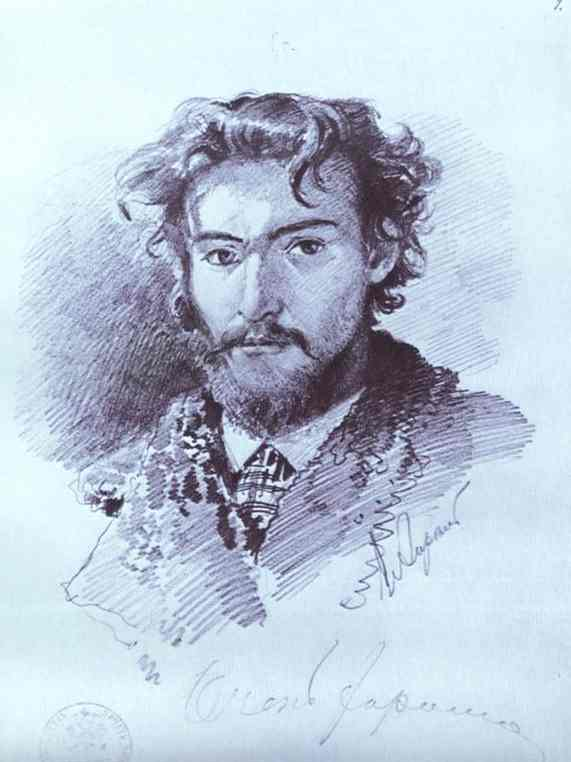
Self-Portrait, 1873

Fyodor Alexandrovich Vasilyev (Russian: Фёдор Александрович Васильев; 1850 in Gatchina – 1873 in Yalta) was a Russian Imperial landscape painter who introduced the lyrical landscape style in Russian art.

== Biography ==
Fyodor Vasilyev was born in Gatchina to a low-level government official, Alexander Vasilyevich Vasilyev, and Olga Emelyanova Polyntseva on 22 February N.S. 1850. His parents married four years later, so he was always considered an illegitimate child. Feodor had to earn his living from the age of 12 – he worked as a mailman, scribe, and assistant to a restorer of pictures. After his father's death, he became the sole supporter of the family.

In 1863, he managed to enter the evening classes of the School of Painting at the Society for Promotion of Artists (Russian: Школа Поощрения Художеств, romanized: Shkola Pooshchreniya Khudozhestv). While at school, Vasilyev got acquainted with many painters, who took care of him.

In 1866 famous landscape painter Ivan Shishkin fell in love with Feodor's sister Evgenia Vassilyev. Shishkin became acquainted with Feodor and started to teach him landscape painting. From July to November 1867 Shishkin and Vassilyev worked together on the island of Valaam. Some places on Valaam were subjects of both artists' paintings. Later Shishkin introduced Feodor to Ivan Kramskoi, Ilya Repin, and to the art collectors Pavel Mikhailovich Tretyakov and Pavel Sergeyevich Stroganov. Later Vasilyev became a major competitor to Ivan Shishkin and the latter was often accused of using intrigues and administrative influence trying to win over Vasilyev on different art competitions.

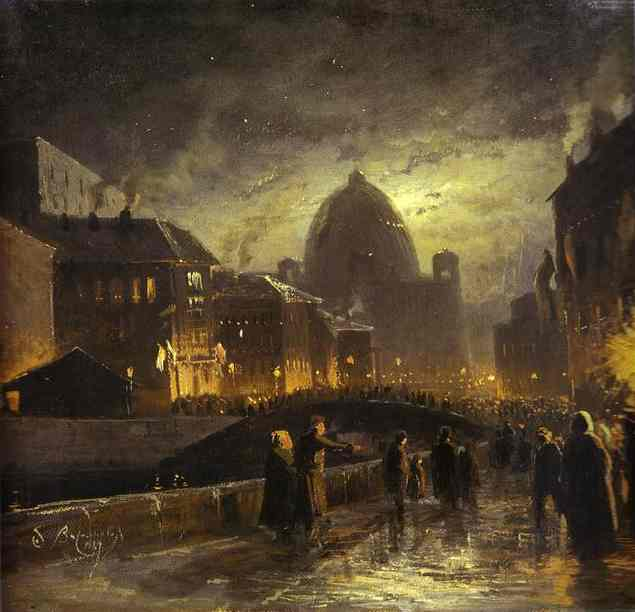
Illumination in St. Petersburg. 1869

In Vasilyev’s early works, such as After a Thunderstorm (1868), Near a Watering Place (1868) and others, one can feel the influence of the Barbizon school; it affected his art but never resulted in a non-creative borrowing of the motifs. Though, at first, Vasilyev was somewhat inferior technically to the Barbizon painters, most critics agree that he eventually found his own way of handling the subject. After a Rain (1869) and After a Rain. Country Road exceed in many respects the Barbizon stormy scenes in their expressiveness and deeply national sound.

In 1870, Vasilyev traveled on the Volga with Ilya Repin, the picture Volga View. Barges(1870) was a great success. In 1870 he became a member of the Peredvizhniki movement (one of the original twenty members).

In 1871, Vasilyev painted Thaw (1871), which made him famous immediately. The tzar's family (Prince Alexander, future Alexander III of Russia), ordered a copy, and the Society for Promotion of Artists awarded him first prize. Later Prince Alexander's copy was exhibited in the 1872 London World Fair and won a medal. Vasilyev was admitted, as an intern, to the Imperial Academy of Arts (which, among other things, gave him an exemption from conscription to the Army).

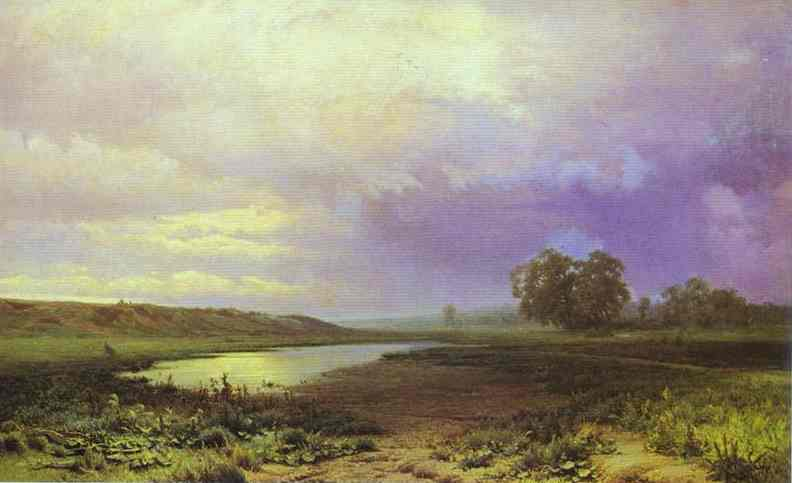
Wet Meadow 1872

The "boy genius", as he was called in the artistic circles of Russia, had no time to enjoy his popularity – he was diagnosed with tuberculosis and had to leave St. Petersburg forever. He moved to Crimea. The Society for Promotion of Artists sponsored his stay there, but he was obliged to pay with his paintings.

Vasilyev could not get used to the new scenery. He went on to paint the Russian plains; his works, such as his masterpiece Wet Meadow (1872), were done from memory, old sketches and his imagination. After some time Vasilyev started to draw the Crimea, gradually beginning to feel an attraction to its mountain views. Mountains of Crimea (1873) was an outstanding work and the last work of the artist.

He died in Yalta on 6 October N.S. 1873 at the age of 23. His posthumous exhibition in Saint Petersburg was a great success, and all his works were sold prior to the exhibition. His works had a strong influence on the next generation of Russian landscape painters. Nikolai Ge said, He discovered for us the Sky. Many art historians emphasize Fedor Vasilyev's influence on Isaac Levitan, Valentin Serov, Viktor Borisov-Musatov.

== Works ==
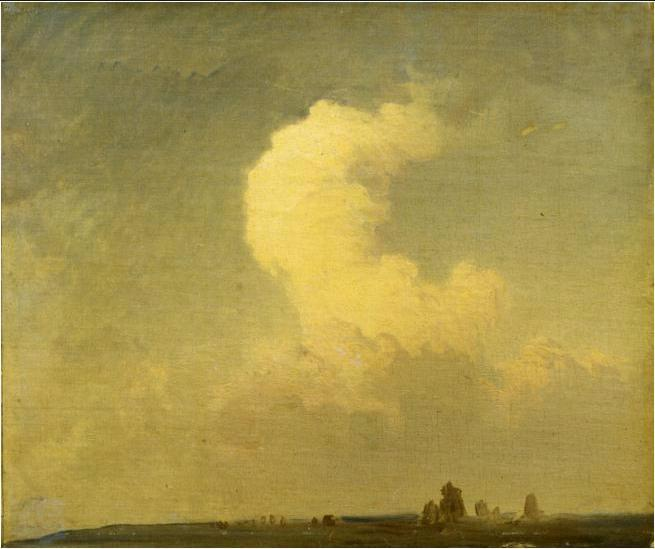
The Cloud, 1860s

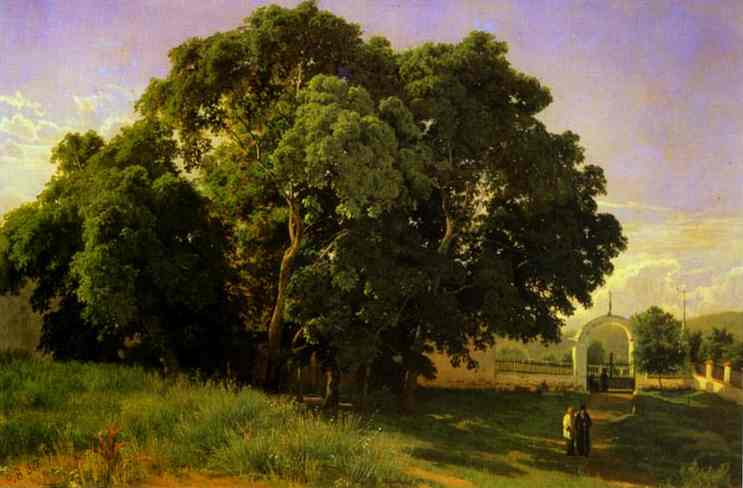
Near a Church. Valaam. 1867

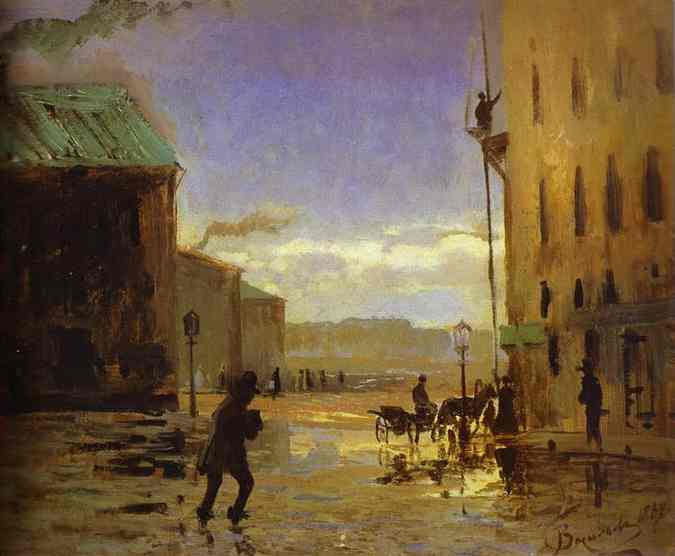
After a Rain. 1867

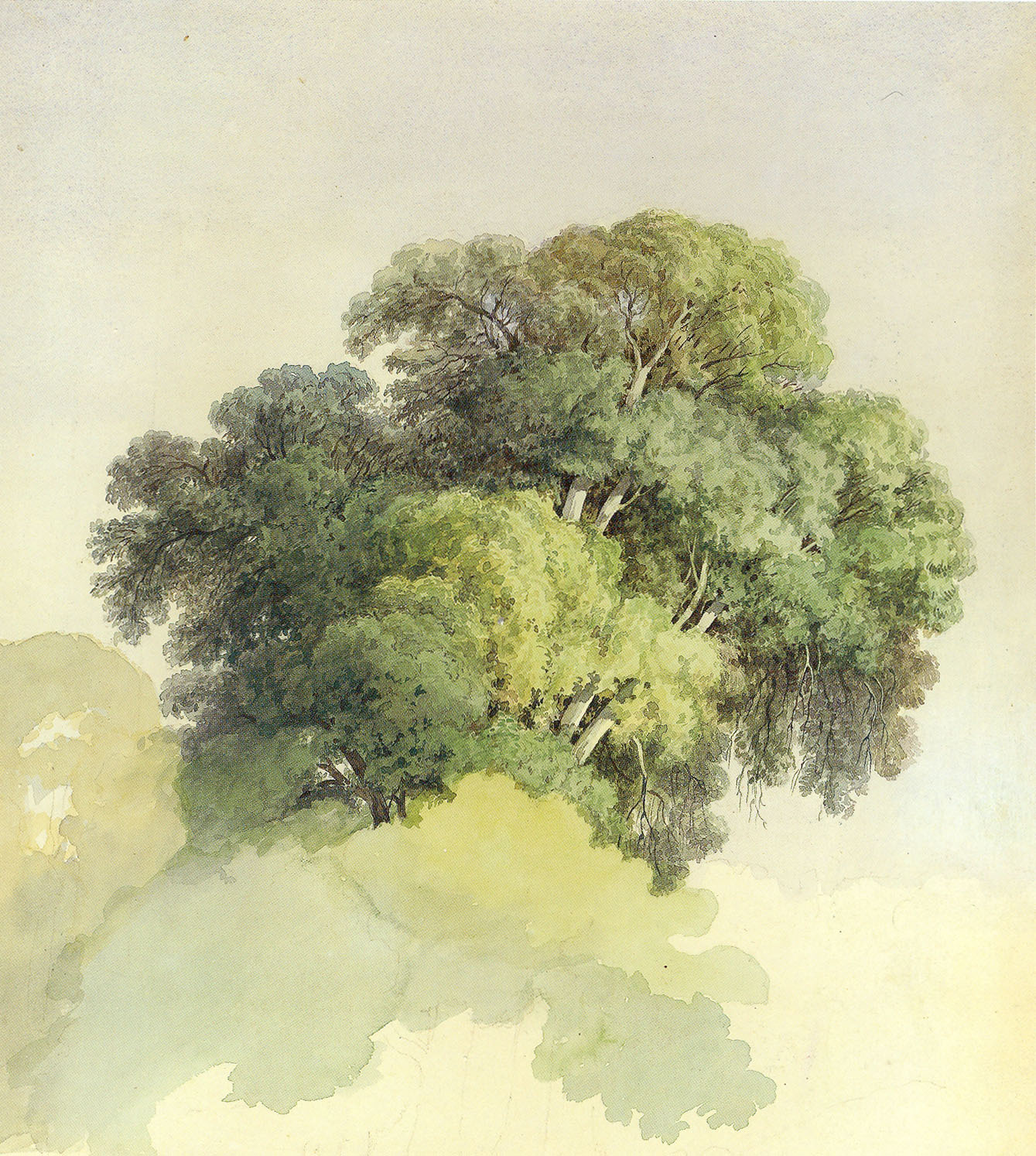
The Crowns of the Trees. 1867

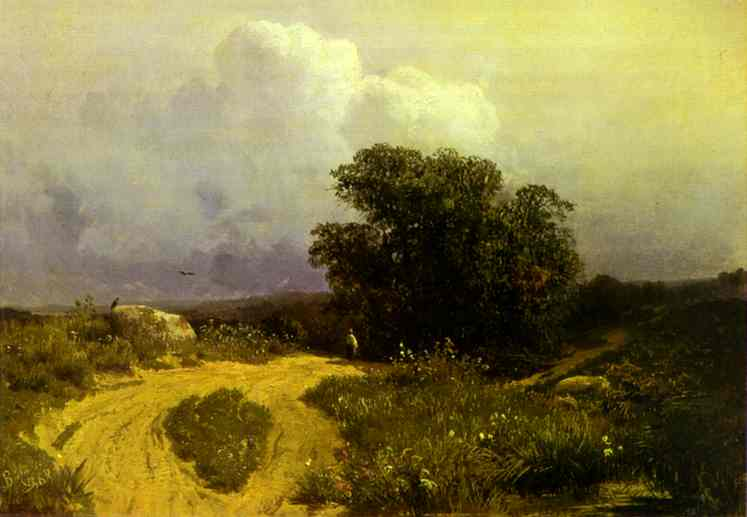
Before a Thunderstorm. 1868

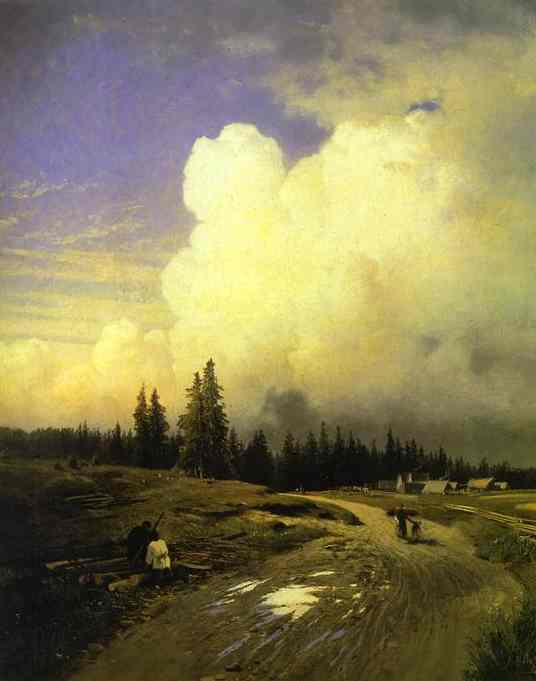
After a Thunderstorm. 1868

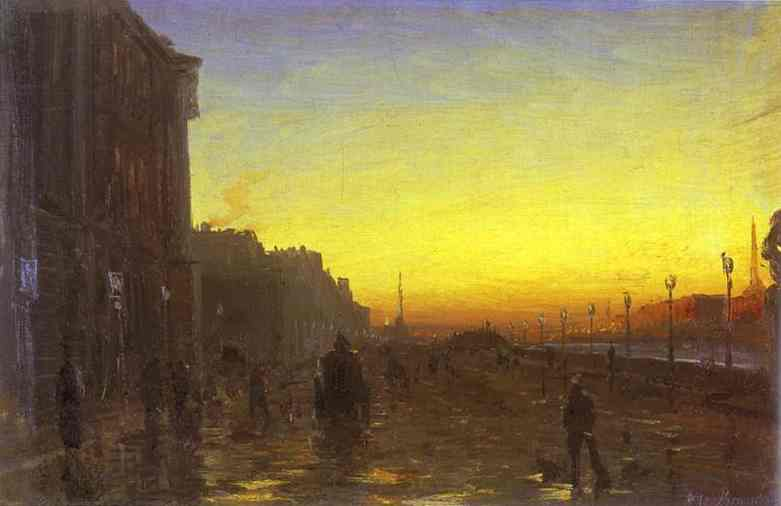
Dawn in Saint Petersburg

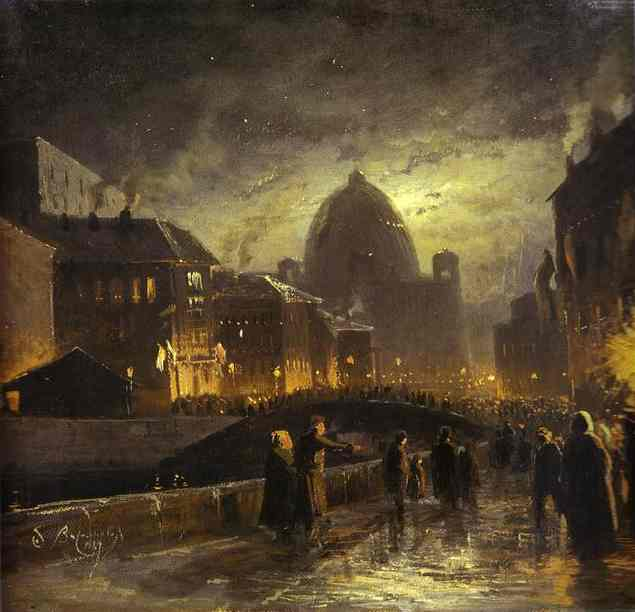
Illumination in Saint Petersburg. 1869

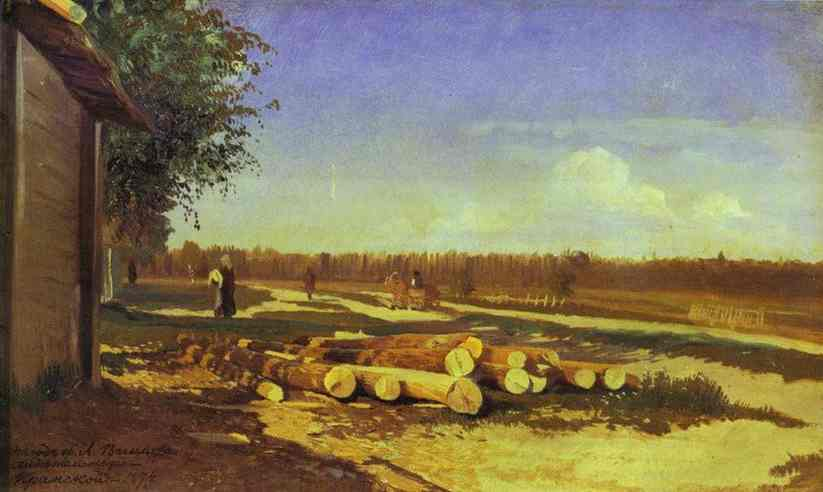
Logs By the Road. 1867-1869

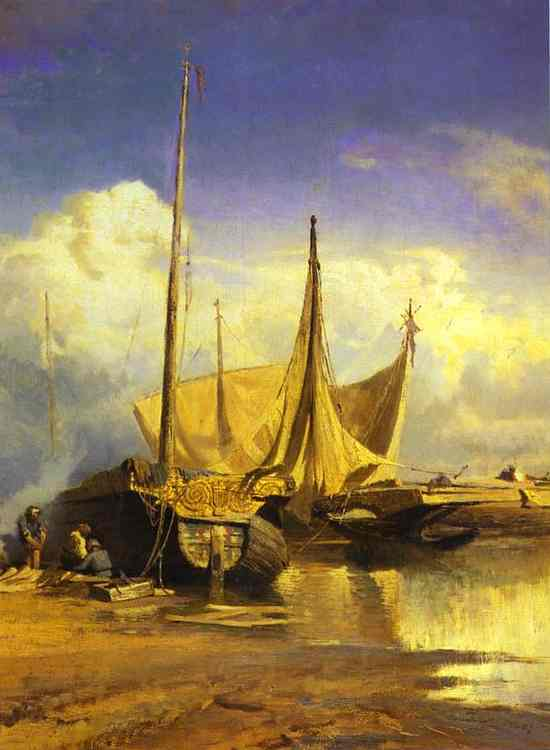
Barges on Volga 1870

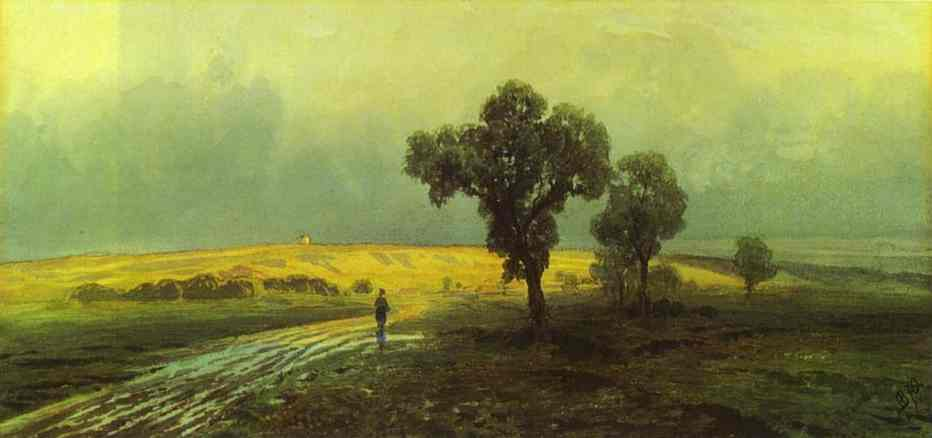
After a Heavy Rain. 1870

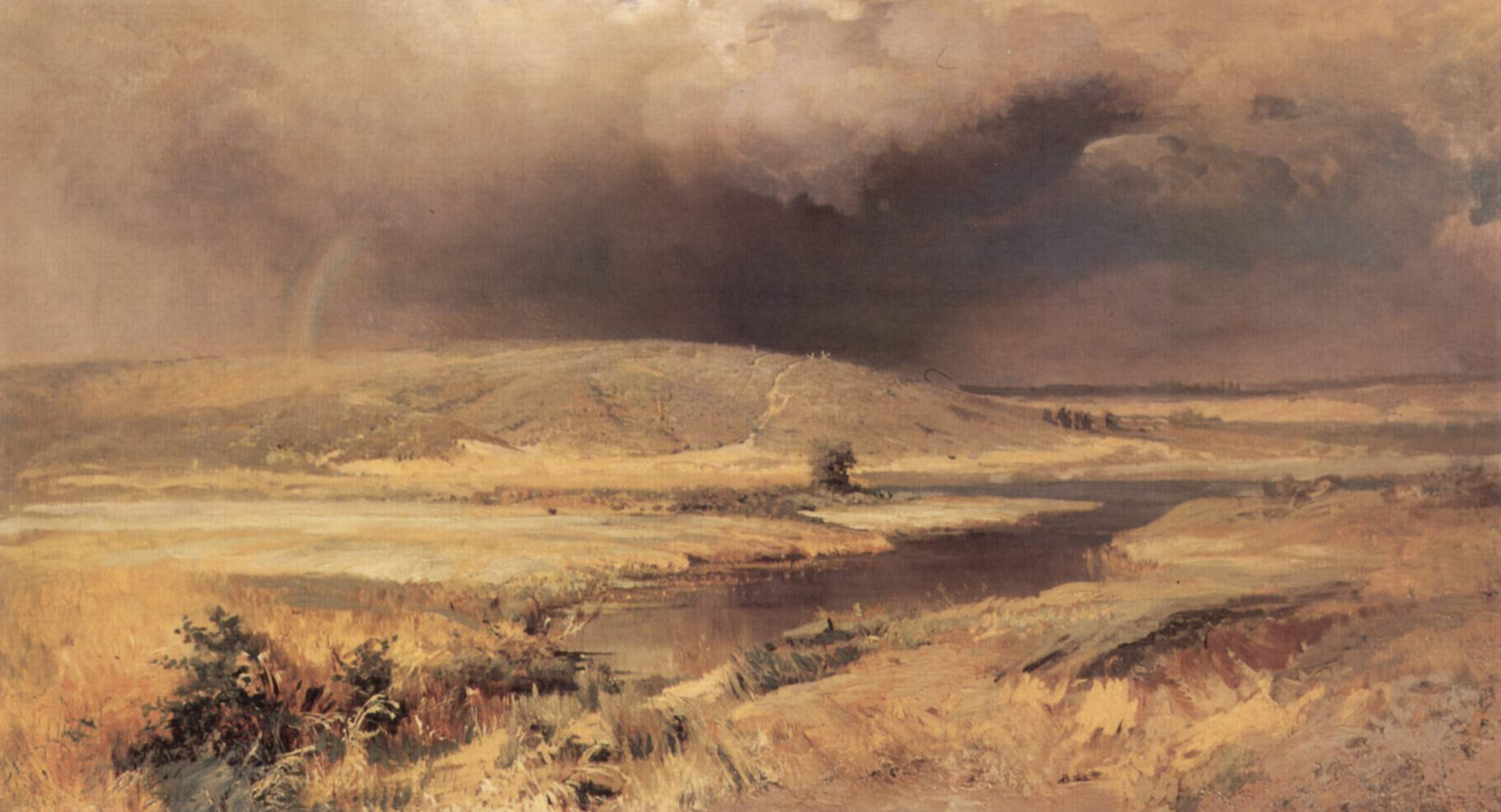
Lakuna on Volga 1870-1871

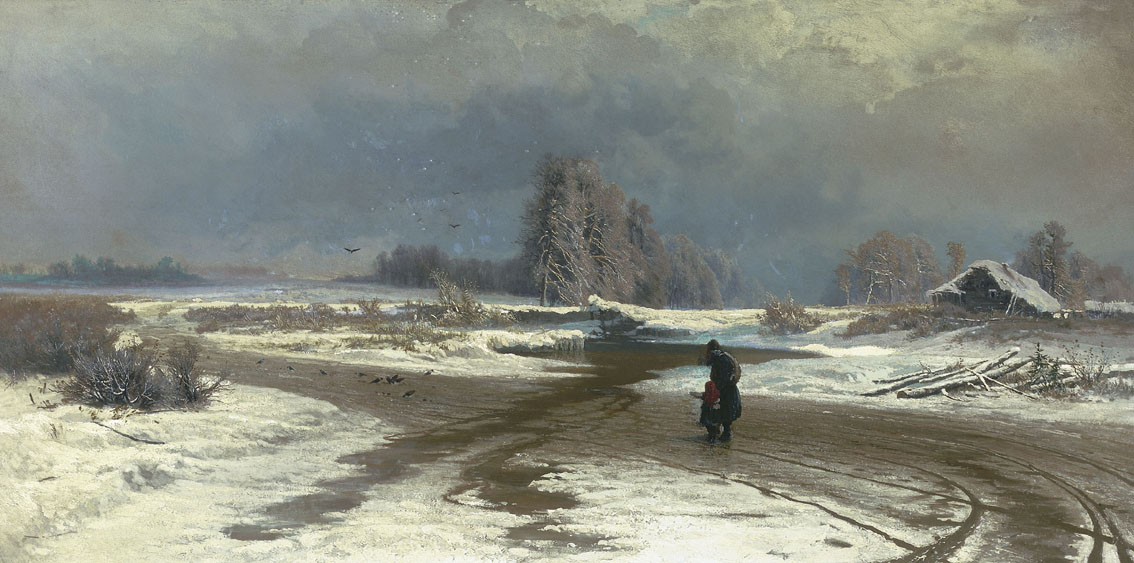
Thaw 1871

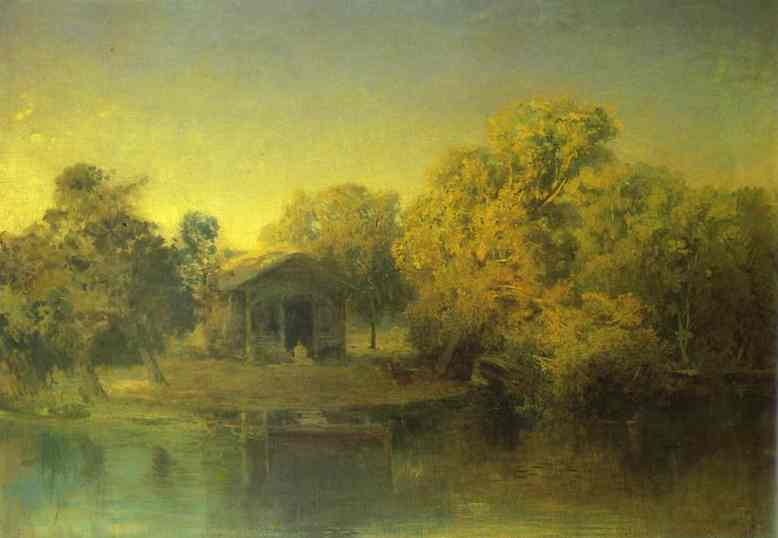
Pond at the Sunset. 1871

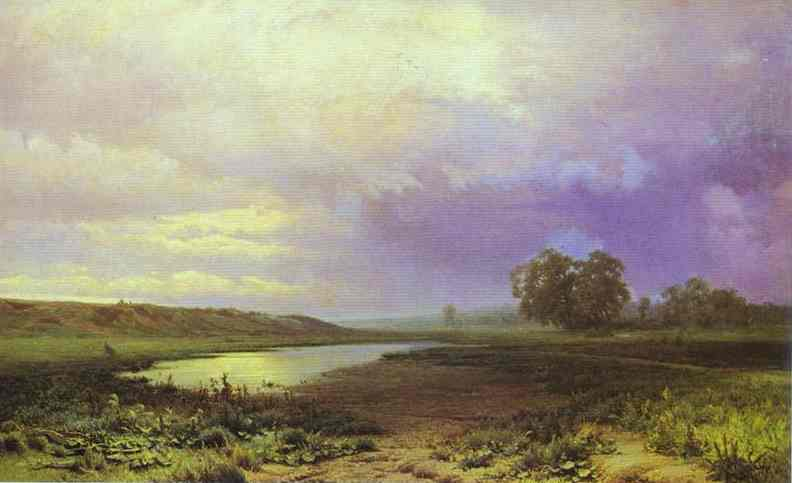
Wet Meadow. 1872

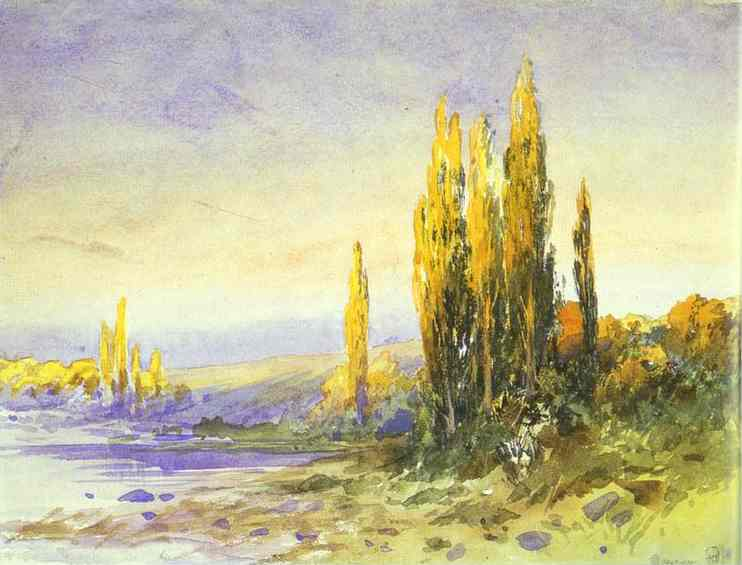
Lombardy Poplars on the Bank of a Lake. Evening.

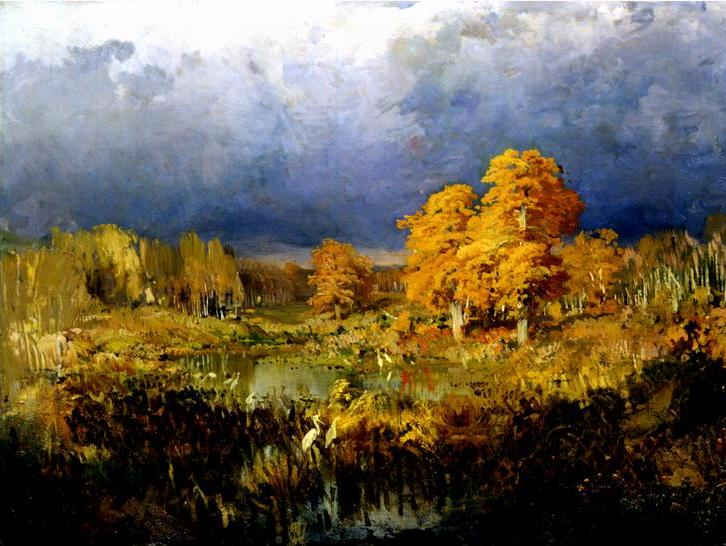
Swamp in the Forest, 1872

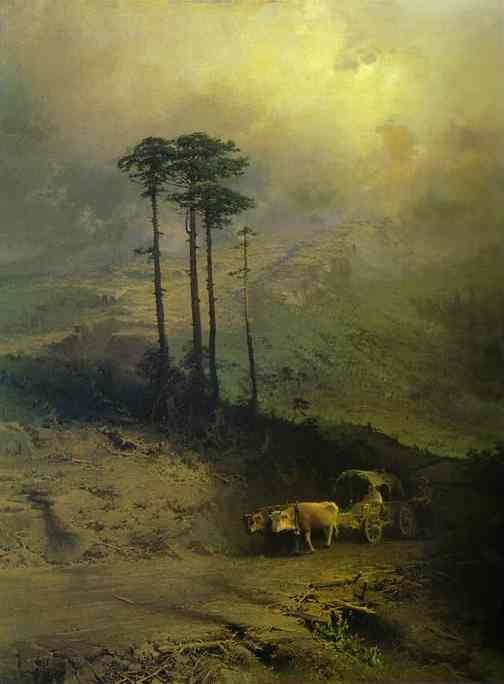
In the Mountains of the Crimea. 1873

== In philately ==
- In 1975, the USSR Post issued in honor of Vasiliev a series of six stamps and a block.

== See also ==
- List of Russian artists
