= Golovino, Kirzhachsky District, Vladimir Oblast =

Golovino Головино
- Village
- Location within Vladimir Oblast Location within Russia
- Coordinates: 55°58′N 38°46′E
- Country: Russia
- Region: Vladimir Oblast
- District: Kirzhachsky District
- Time zone: UTC+3:00

Golovino (Russian: Головино) is a rural locality (a village) in Filippovskoye Rural Settlement, Kirzhachsky District, Vladimir Oblast, Russia. The population was 4 as of 2010. There are 21 streets.

== Geography ==
Golovino is located 32 km southwest of Kirzhach (the district's administrative centre) by road. Bynino is the nearest rural locality.
