= Pavel Golovin =

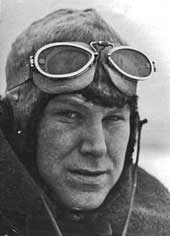
- Born: 26 April 1909; Naro-Fominsk, Russian Empire
- Died: 27 April 1940 (aged 31)
- Military career
- Allegiance: Soviet Union
- Awards: Hero of the Soviet Union; Order of Lenin; Order of the Red Banner; Order of the Red Star

Pavel Golovin (26 April 1909 – 27 April 1940) was a Soviet polar aviation pilot and colonel.

== Biography ==
Golovin was the world's first pilot to fly an airplane over the North Pole, on 5 May 1937. The first flight over the North Pole had been made in the dirigible Nord by pilot Umberto Nobile and polar explorers Lincoln Ellsworth and Roald Amundsen on May 13, 1926.

== Awards and honors ==
- Hero of the Soviet Union
- Order of Lenin
- Order of the Red Banner
- Order of the Red Star

A street in his city of birth, Naro-Fominsk, is named after him.

School No. 680, named after Golovin, was built in 1968 on the presumed site of his death at 4k2 Yana Rainisa Boulevard in Moscow.
