= Golovino, Selivanovsky District, Vladimir Oblast =

Golovino Головино
- Village
- Location within Vladimir Oblast Location within Russia
- Coordinates: 55°56′N 41°52′E
- Country: Russia
- Region: Vladimir Oblast
- District: Selivanovsky District
- Time zone: UTC+3:00

Golovino (Russian: Головино) is a rural locality (a village) in Chertkovskoye Rural Settlement, Selivanovsky District, Vladimir Oblast, Russia. The population was 6 as of 2010.

== Geography ==
Golovino is located on the Tetrukh River, 18 km northeast of Krasnaya Gorbatka (the district's administrative centre) by road. Nadezhdino is the nearest rural locality.
