= Golovinskaya, Ivanovo Oblast =

Golovinskaya Головинская
- Village
- Location within Ivanovo Oblast Location within Russia
- Coordinates: 57°15′N 42°18′E
- Country: Russia
- Region: Ivanovo Oblast
- District: Kineshemsky District
- Time zone: UTC+3:00

Golovinskaya (Russian: Головинская) is a rural locality (a village) in Kineshemsky District, Ivanovo Oblast, Russia. Population: 143 (2010 census);

== Geography ==
This rural locality is located 24 kilometres (15 mi) from Kineshma (the district's administrative centre), 87 kilometres (54 mi) from Ivanovo (capital of Ivanovo Oblast) and 328 kilometres (204 mi) from Moscow. Batmany is the nearest rural locality.
