= Alexis Golovin =

Russian pianist

- Born: October 31, 1945; Moscow, Russia
- Died: July 12, 2023 (aged 77); Geneva, Switzerland
- Occupation: Classical pianist

Alexis Fyodorovich Golovin (Russian: Алексей Фёдорович Головин) (31 October 1945 - 12 July 2023) was a Russian classical pianist.

Golovin began studying the piano at the age of 5 with Anna Artobolevskaya at the Central Music School of Moscow and later at the Moscow Tchaikovsky Conservatory, where he studied both the piano and musicology. He completed his studies at the Geneva Conservatory, where he won first prize with distinction, for virtuosity.

A prizewinner at the Casagrande Competition in Terni and the Busoni Competition in Bolzano, he has given concerts in Europe, Asia, Southern Africa, North and South America, as well as at the most prestigious festivals. He has played in duo with Martha Argerich and has given world premieres, including those of Ginastera’s Second and Third sonatas. He has maintained close connections with his native country and regularly performs in Moscow's most important concert halls, including the Great Hall of the Tchaikovsky Conservatory; he also performs with the State Philharmonic Orchestra.

Golovin dedicated much time to teaching – he was a professor at the Geneva Conservatory – and his students have won first prizes in various international competitions. His prolific discography includes works by Chopin and Schumann, Rachmaninoff's Etudes Tableaux, works by Scriabin, Liszt's Piano Concerto No. 1, B minor Sonata and Mephisto Waltz, chamber music, and the piano concertos by Mozart, Rachmaninoff, Scriabin, Nikolai Tcherepnin, and Rodion Shchedrin. Golovin has given many master classes including at the Internationale Sommerakademie Mozarteum in Salzburg, Manhattan School of Music, Conservatory of Buenos-Aires, Conservatory of Moscow, Oxford Philomusica Summer Academy, and Canton International Summer Music Academy.

He was married to the Swiss actress Maya Simon, with whom he has a daughter Marina Golovine, also an actress.

== Sources ==
- http://oxfordphil.com/piano/113/Past%20festivals
- https://web.archive.org/web/20101231003850/http://www.rsi.ch/argerich/welcome.cfm?lng=1&ids=491&idc=10144
