= Golovin =

Golovin may refer to:

- Golovin (crater), a lunar impact crater on the far side of the Moon
- Golovin (surname), people with the surname Golovin or Golovina
- Golovin, Alaska, a US city
  - Golovin Airport

== See also ==
- Maria Golovin, an opera by Gian Carlo Menotti
- Rustavelis Gamziri (formerly known as Golovin Street), an avenue in central Tbilisi, Georgia
- Golovino (disambiguation)
- Golovinsky (disambiguation)
