= Golovino, Petushinsky District, Vladimir Oblast =

Golovino Головино
- Village
- Location within Vladimir Oblast Location within Russia
- Coordinates: 56°01′N 39°11′E
- Country: Russia
- Region: Vladimir Oblast
- District: Petushinsky District
- Time zone: UTC+3:00

Golovino (Russian: Головино) is a rural locality (a village) in Nagornoye Rural Settlement, Petushinsky District, Vladimir Oblast, Russia. The population was 278 as of 2010. There are 3 streets.

== Geography ==
Golovino is located on the Volga River, 31 km northwest of Petushki (the district's administrative centre) by road. Vyalovo is the nearest rural locality.
