= Golovinskoye, Irkutsk Oblast =

Golovinskoye Головинское
- Village
- Location within Irkutsk Oblast Location within Russia
- Coordinates: 53°25′N 102°40′E
- Country: Russia
- Region: Irkutsk Oblast
- District: Alarsky District
- Time zone: UTC+8:00

Golovinskoye (Russian: Головинское) is a rural locality (a selo) in Alarsky District, Irkutsk Oblast, Russia. Population: 266 (2010 census);

== Geography ==
This rural locality is located 13 kilometres (8.1 mi) from Kutulik (the district's administrative centre), 166 kilometres (103 mi) from Irkutsk (capital of Irkutsk Oblast) and 4,317 kilometres (2,682 mi) from Moscow. Zanina is the nearest rural locality.
