= Aleksei Golovin (footballer) =

Russian footballer

Personal information
- Full name: Aleksei Nikolayevich Golovin
- Date of birth: 29 March 1981 (age 45)
- Place of birth: Voronezh, Russian SFSR
- Height: 1.85 m (6 ft 1 in)
- Positions: Forward; defender

Senior career*
Years	Team	Apps	(Gls)
1998	FC Dorozhnik Novaya Usman		
1999	FC Fakel-2 Voronezh		
2000	FC Gazovik Ostrogozhsk		
2002	FC Fakel Voronezh	4	(0)
2003–2004	FC Lokomotiv Liski (amateur)		
2005	FC Dynamo Voronezh (amateur)		
2006	FC Dynamo Voronezh	30	(13)
2007	FC Dynamo Bryansk	33	(5)
2008–2009	FC Zodiak-Oskol Stary Oskol	43	(8)
2010	FC Lokomotiv Liski	17	(2)
2011–2012	FC Khopyor Novokhopyorsk		
- * Club domestic league appearances and goals

Aleksei Nikolayevich Golovin (Russian: Алексей Николаевич Головин; born 29 March 1981) is a former Russian professional football player.

== Club career ==
He played two seasons in the Russian Football National League for FC Fakel Voronezh and FC Dynamo Bryansk.
