= Susaninsky District =

Susaninsky District Сусанинский район (Russian)
- District
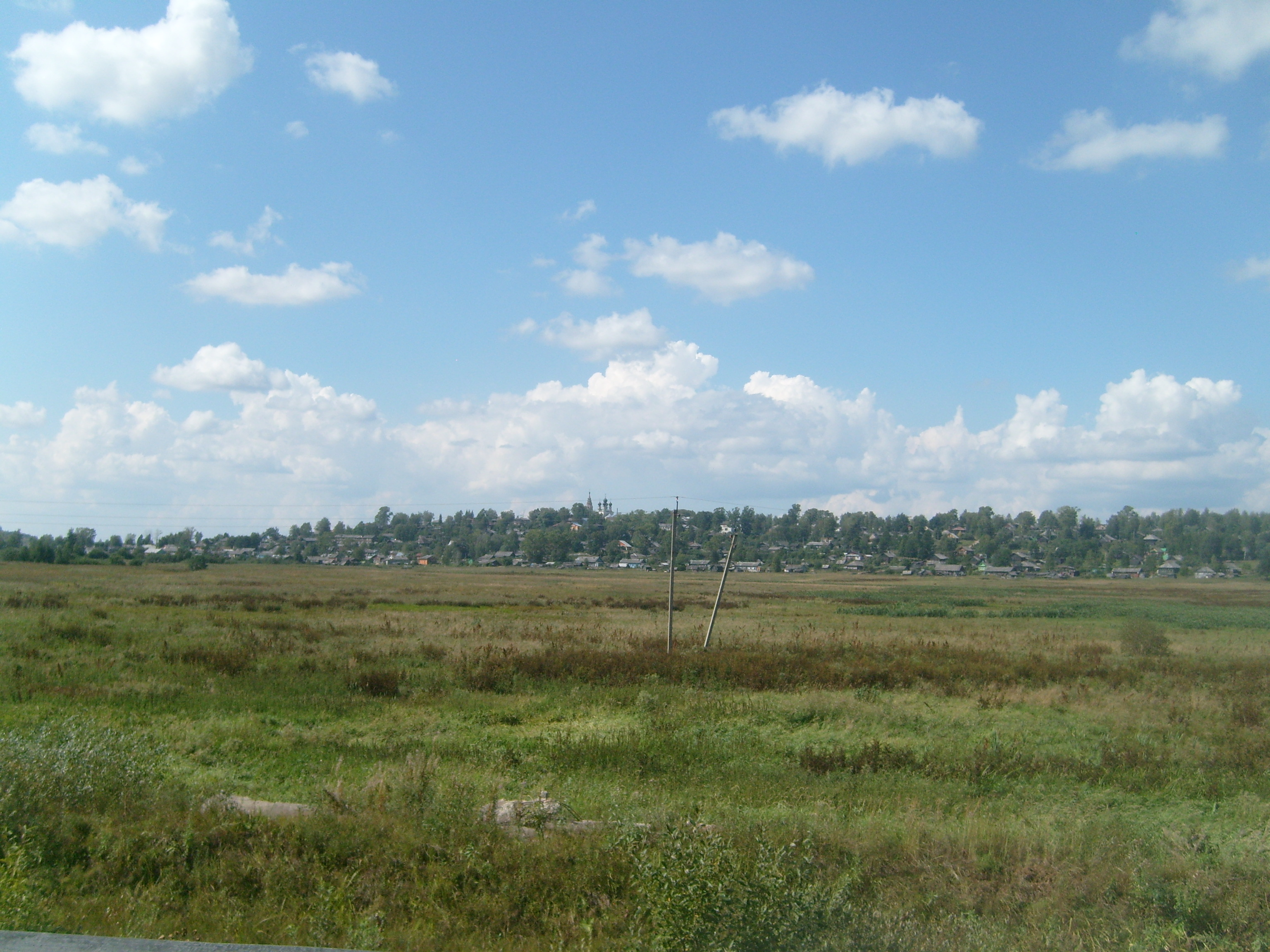
- Distance view of Village (selo) Susanino, Susaninsky District

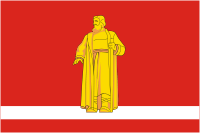
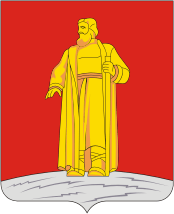
- Flag Coat of arms
- Location of Susaninsky District in Kostroma Oblast
- Coordinates: 58°08′48″N 41°35′02″E
- Country: Russia
- Federal subject: Kostroma Oblast
- Established: 8 October 1928
- Administrative center: Susanino

Area
  - Total: 1,050 km^{2} (410 sq mi)

Population (2010 Census)
  - Total: 7,587
  - Density: 7.23/km^{2} (18.7/sq mi)
  - Urban: 44.9%
  - Rural: 55.1%

Administrative structure
  - Administrative divisions: 1 Urban settlements (urban-type settlements), 6 Settlements
  - Inhabited localities: 1 urban-type settlements, 127 rural localities

Municipal structure
  - Municipally incorporated as: Susaninsky Municipal District
  - Municipal divisions: 1 urban settlements, 6 rural settlements
- Time zone: UTC+3 (MSK)
- OKTMO ID: 34644000
- Website: http://susanino.adm44.ru/index.aspx

Susaninsky District (Russian: Суса́нинский райо́н) is an administrative and municipal district (raion), one of the twenty-four in Kostroma Oblast, Russia. It is located in the west of the oblast. The area of the district is 1,050 square kilometers (410 sq mi). Its administrative center is the urban locality (an urban-type settlement) of Susanino. Population: 5,714 (2021 census); 7,587 (2010 census); 9,184 (2002 Census); 11,165 (1989 Soviet census). The population of Susanino accounts for 52.6% of the district's total population.
