= Lev Lvovich Kamenev =

Russian landscape painter (1833–1886)

Lev Kamenev
- Born: Lev Lvovich Kamenev; 1833 or 1834; Rylsk, Kursk Governorate, Russian Empire
- Died: 26 January 1886 (aged 53); Savvinskaya Sloboda, Moscow Governorate, Russian Empire
- Education: Karl Rabus, Alexei Savrasov
- Known for: Painting

Lev Lvovich Kamenev (Russian: Лев Льво́вич Ка́менев; 1834, according to other sources 1833, Rylsk, Kursk Governorate – 26 January [O.S. 14 January] 1886 Savvinskaya sloboda, Moscow Governorate), was a Russian landscape painter.

== Biography ==
Kamenev was born in 1834. Soon after his birth, his father, a small trader, moved the family to Astrakhan. Lev studied at a local grammar school there but did not complete his studies it because his father needed his assistance in the family shop. Kamenev's passion for painting was recognized the grandfather of Konstantin Korovin, who arranged for him to have his own office and provided him with five thousand rubles for admission to the Art school in St. Petersburg.

In 1854, at the age of twenty-one, Kamenev went to Moscow and enrolled in the Moscow School of Painting, Sculpture and Architecture. There, he studied alongside future celebrities such as Ivan Shishkin and Vasily Perov. Initially, he was mentored by Karl Rabus, and after Rabus's death in 1857, by Alexei Savrasov. In 1858, Kamenev was awarded the title of the Professional Painter of the 3d Degree and became a member of the Moscow Society of Amateurs of Arts. With the Society's support, he embarked on a two-year trip abroad to study and master Western European art. He traveled to Germany and Switzerland, accompanied by Ivan Shishkin.

The peak of Kamenev's career was during the 1860s and 1870s. His painting Winter Road became part of the Tretyakov collection. In 1869, he received the title of Academician of the Academy of Arts for landscape painting for his works Winter View from the Outskirts of Moscow and View from the Outskirts of Porechye. Kamenev also became a member and one of the founders of The Association of Traveling Art Exhibitions (Peredvizhniki). Between 1871 and 1884, he participated in the Association's exhibitions.

Kamenev died alone and impoverished in 1886.

== Works ==
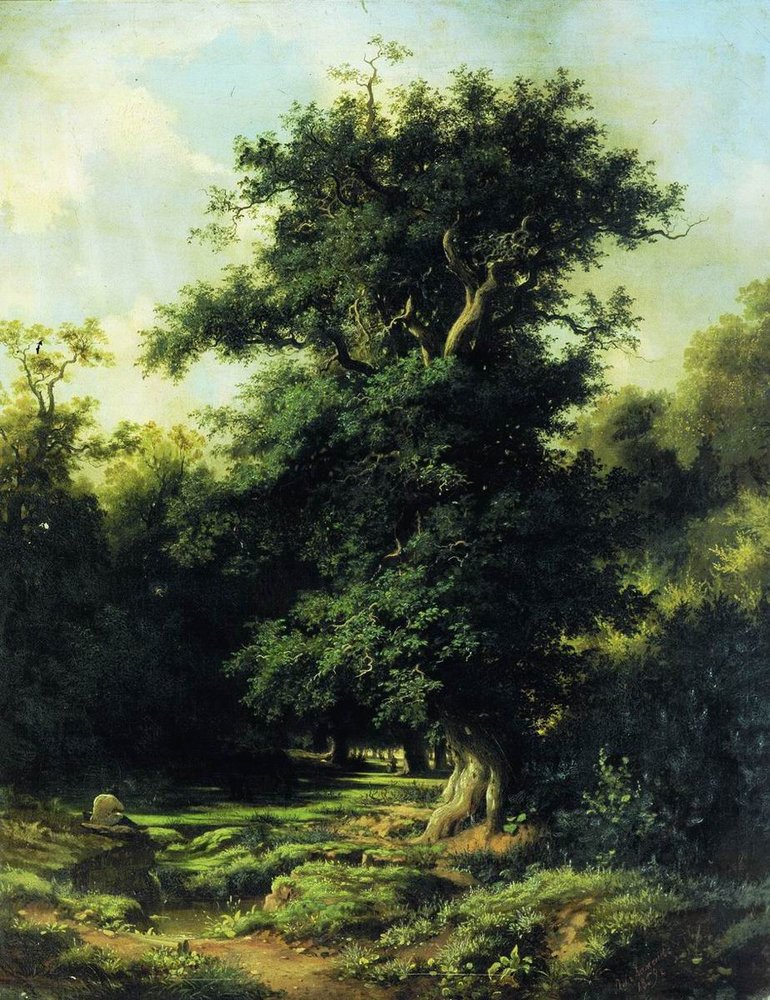
Old Oak, 1859.

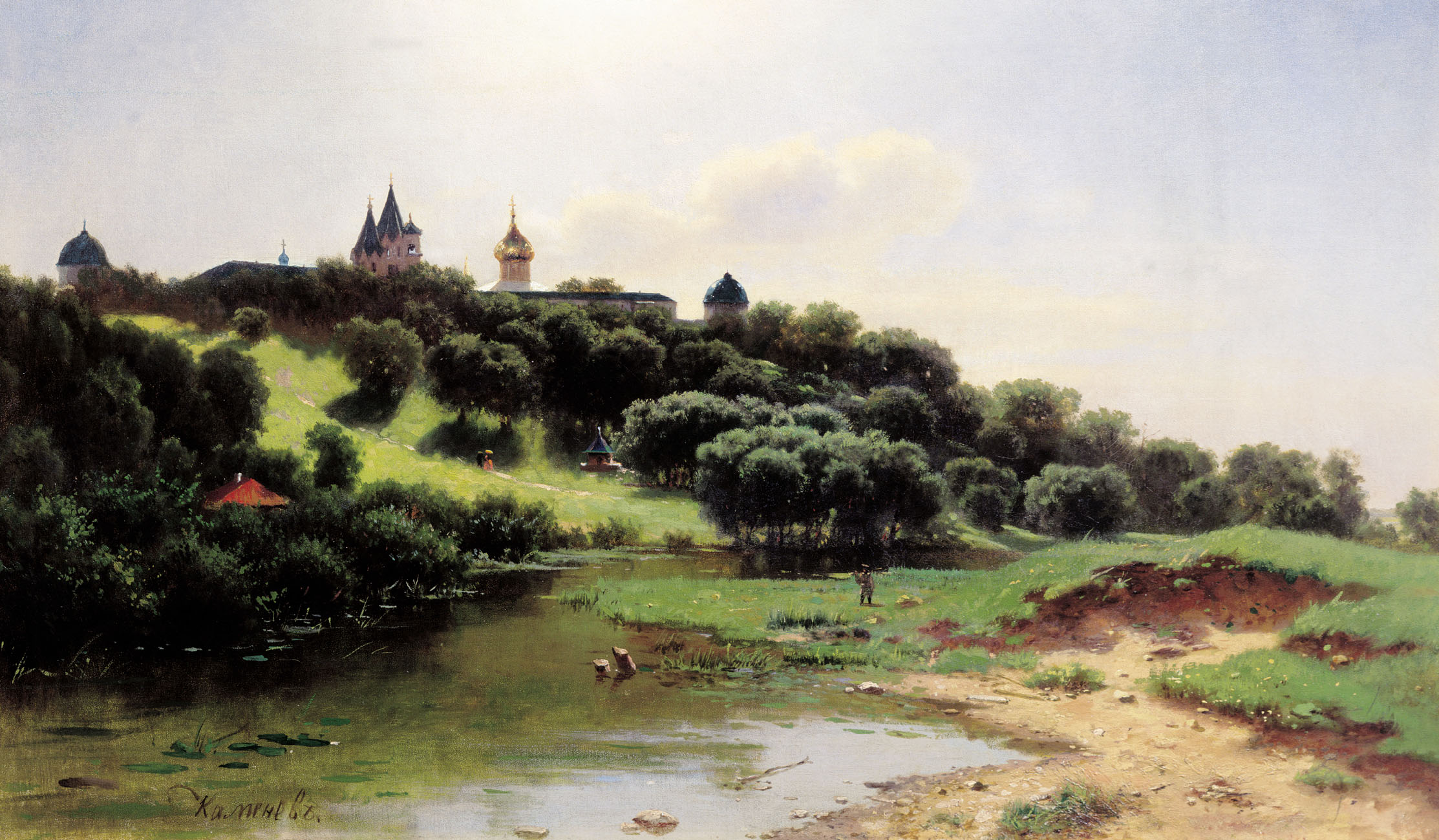
Savvino-Storozhevsky Monastery near Zvenigorod, 1860s.

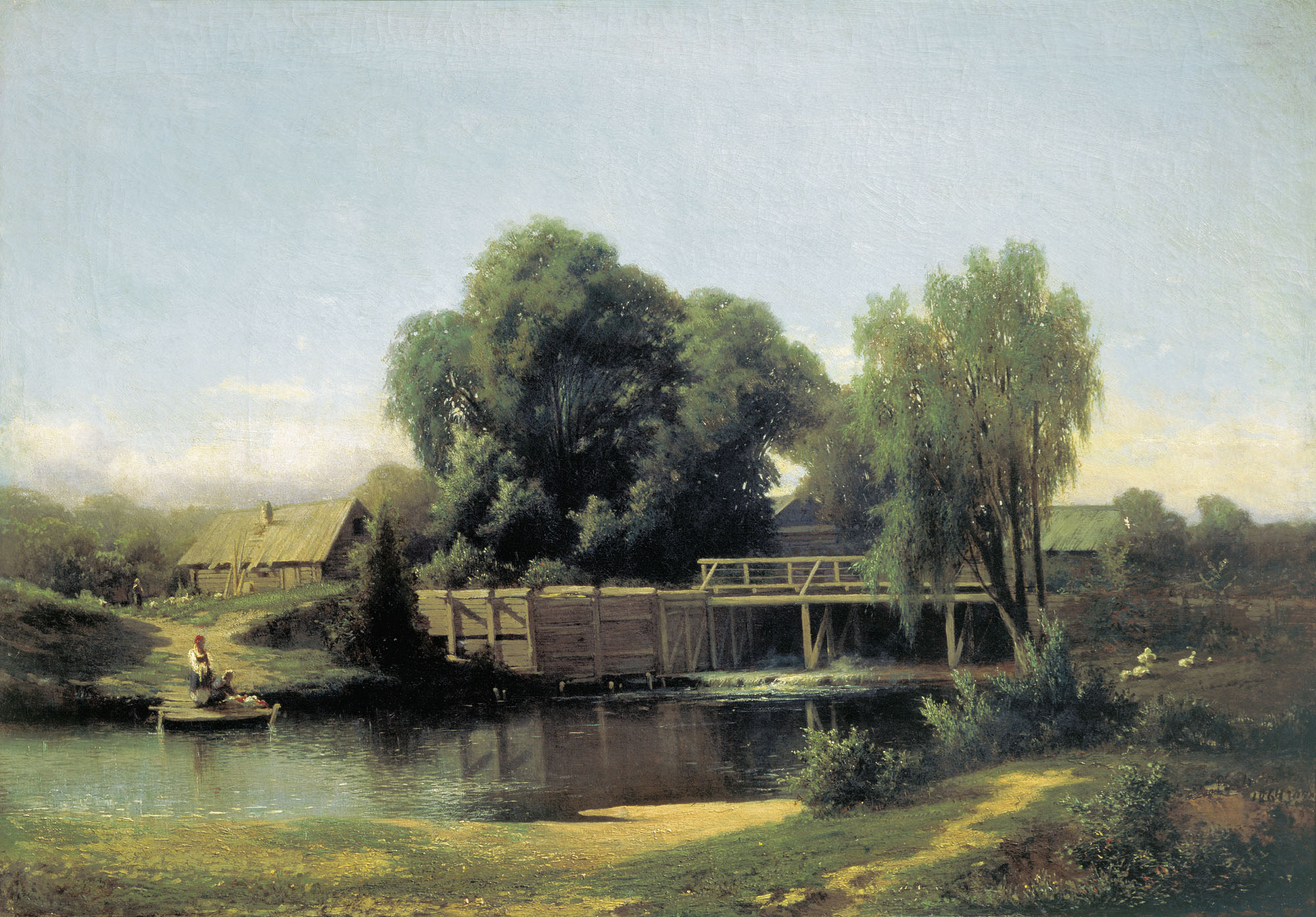
By the Dam, 1864.

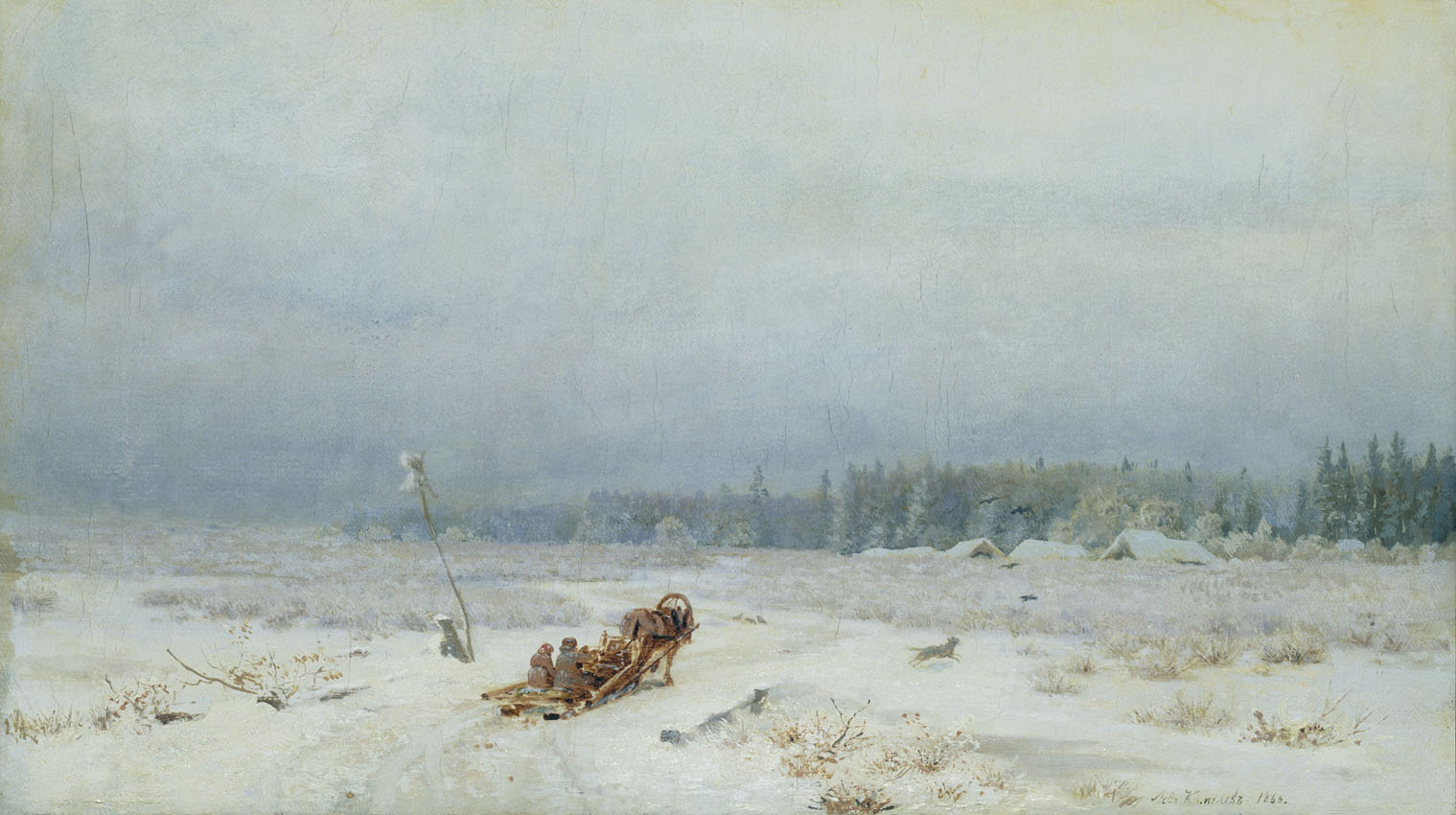
Winter Road, 1866.

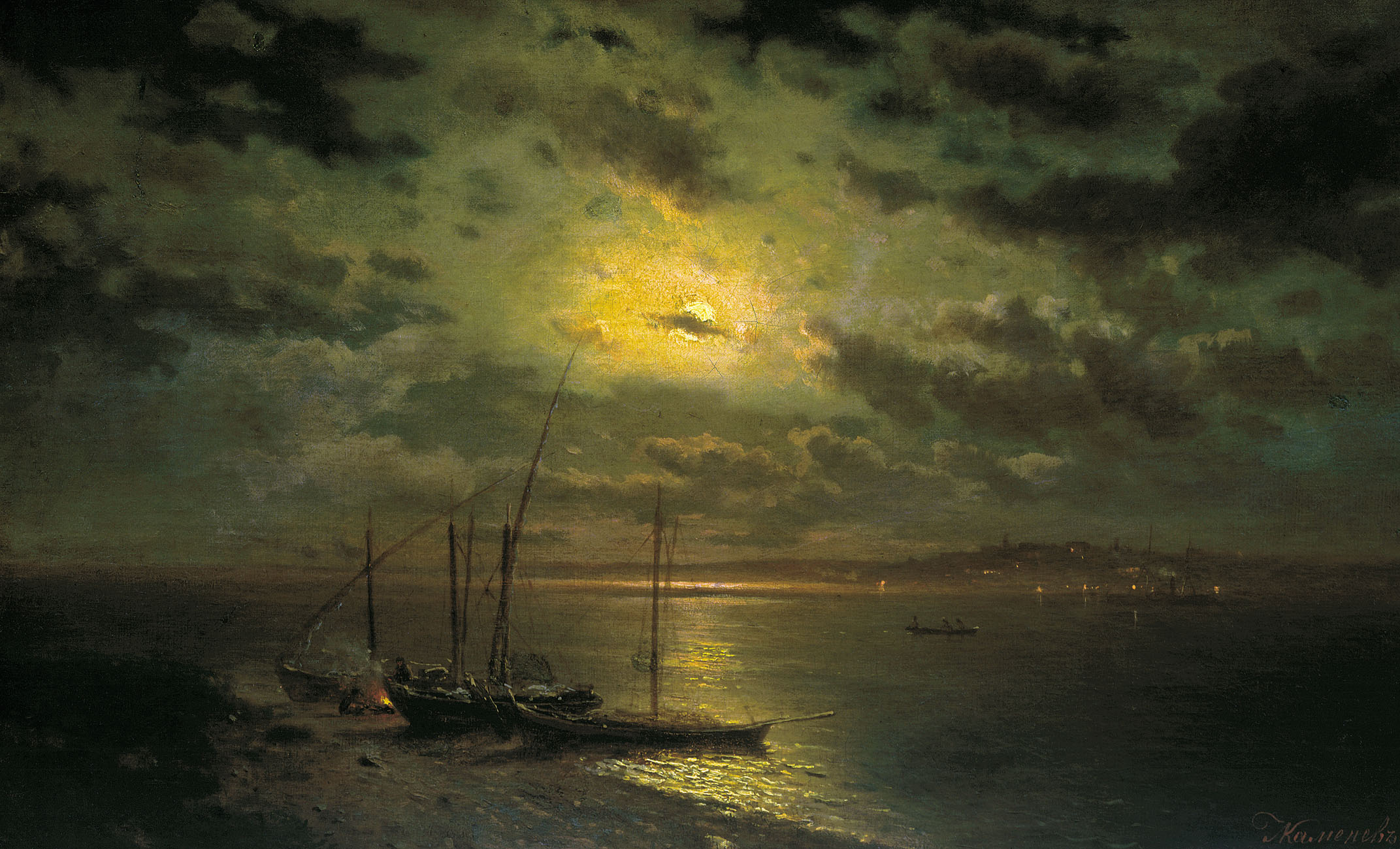
Moonlit Night on the River, 1870s.

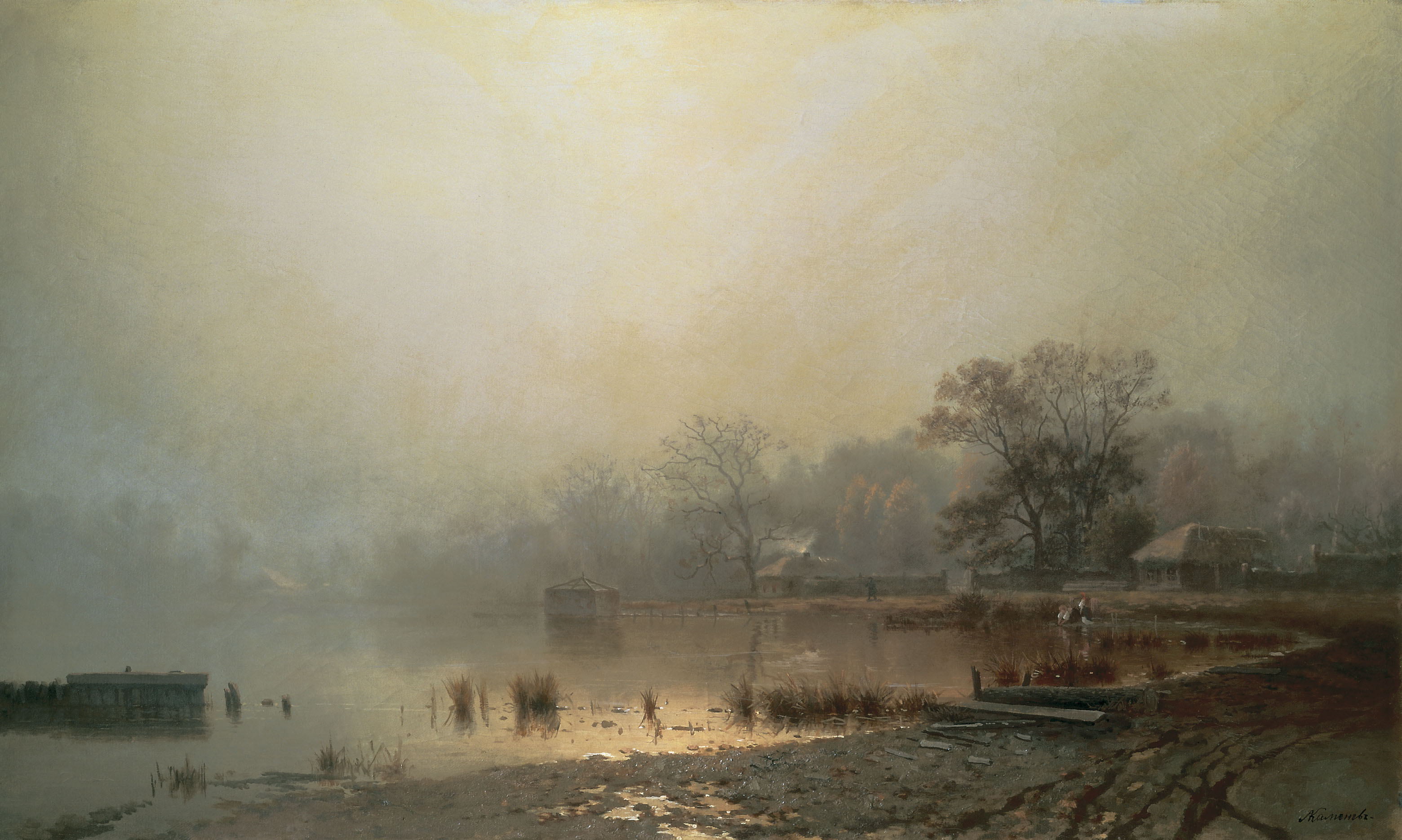
Fog. Red Pond in Moscow in Autumn, 1871.

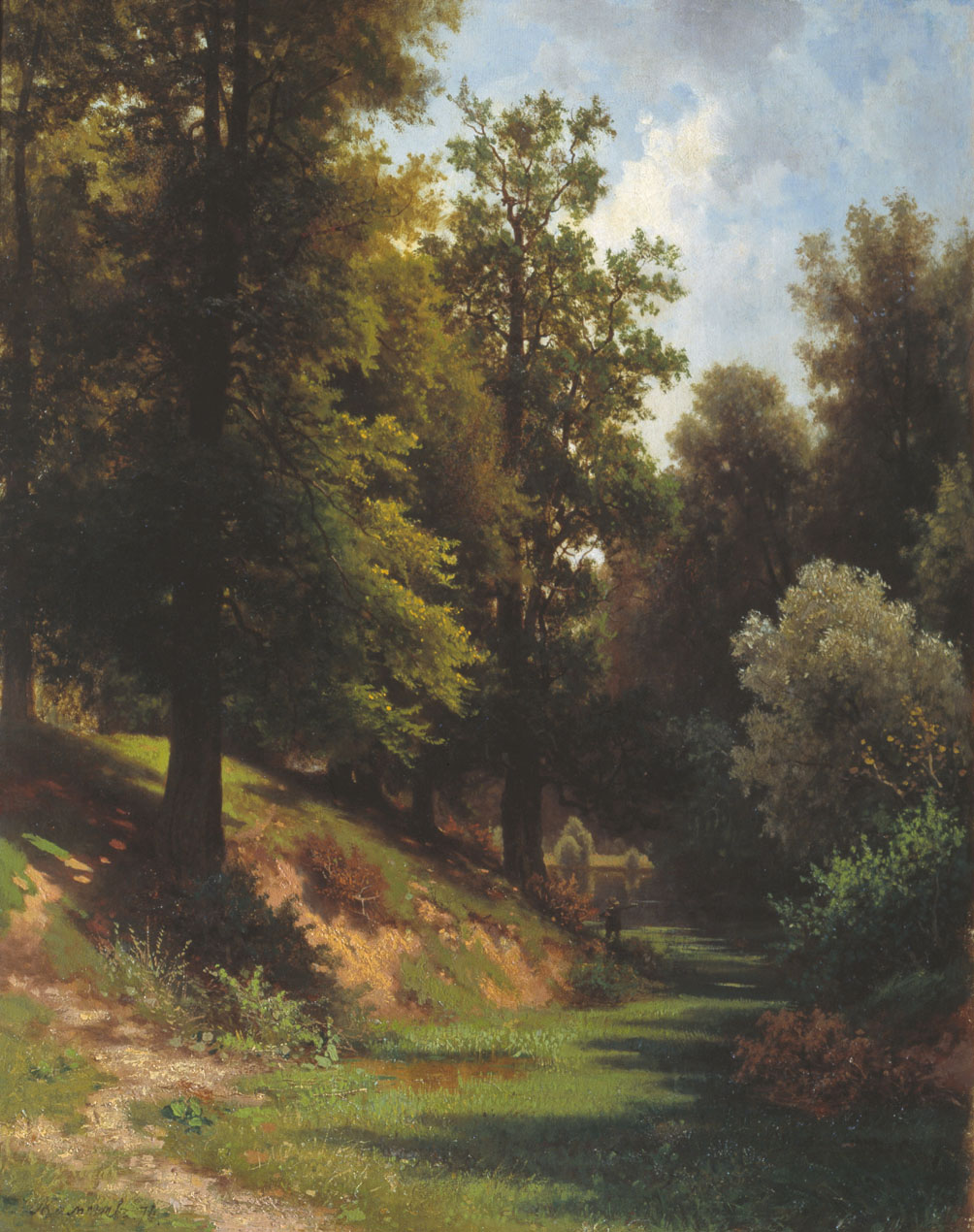
Forest, 1874.

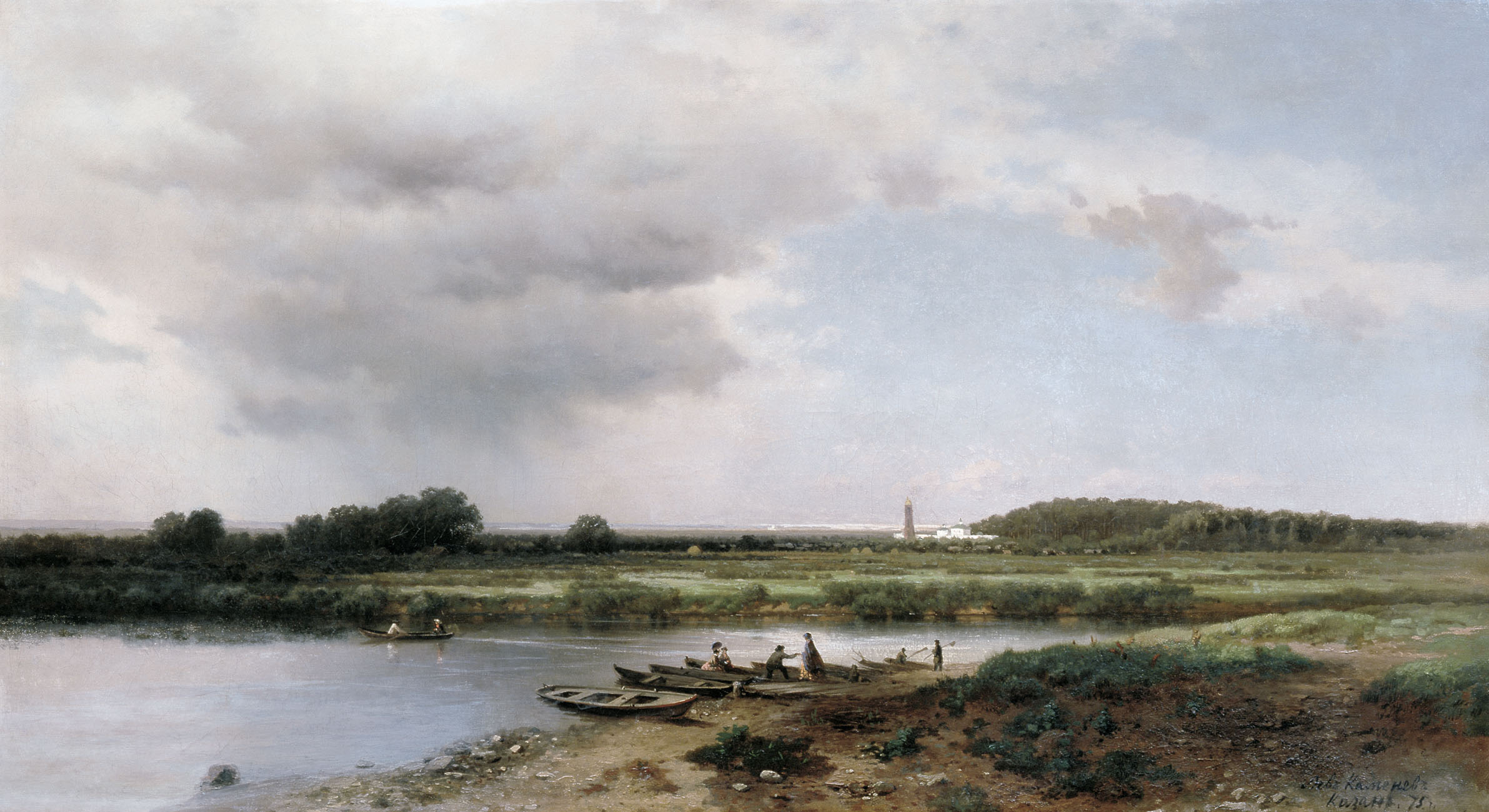
View on the Kazanka River, 1875.
