= Karl Rabus =

Russian painter (1800–1857)

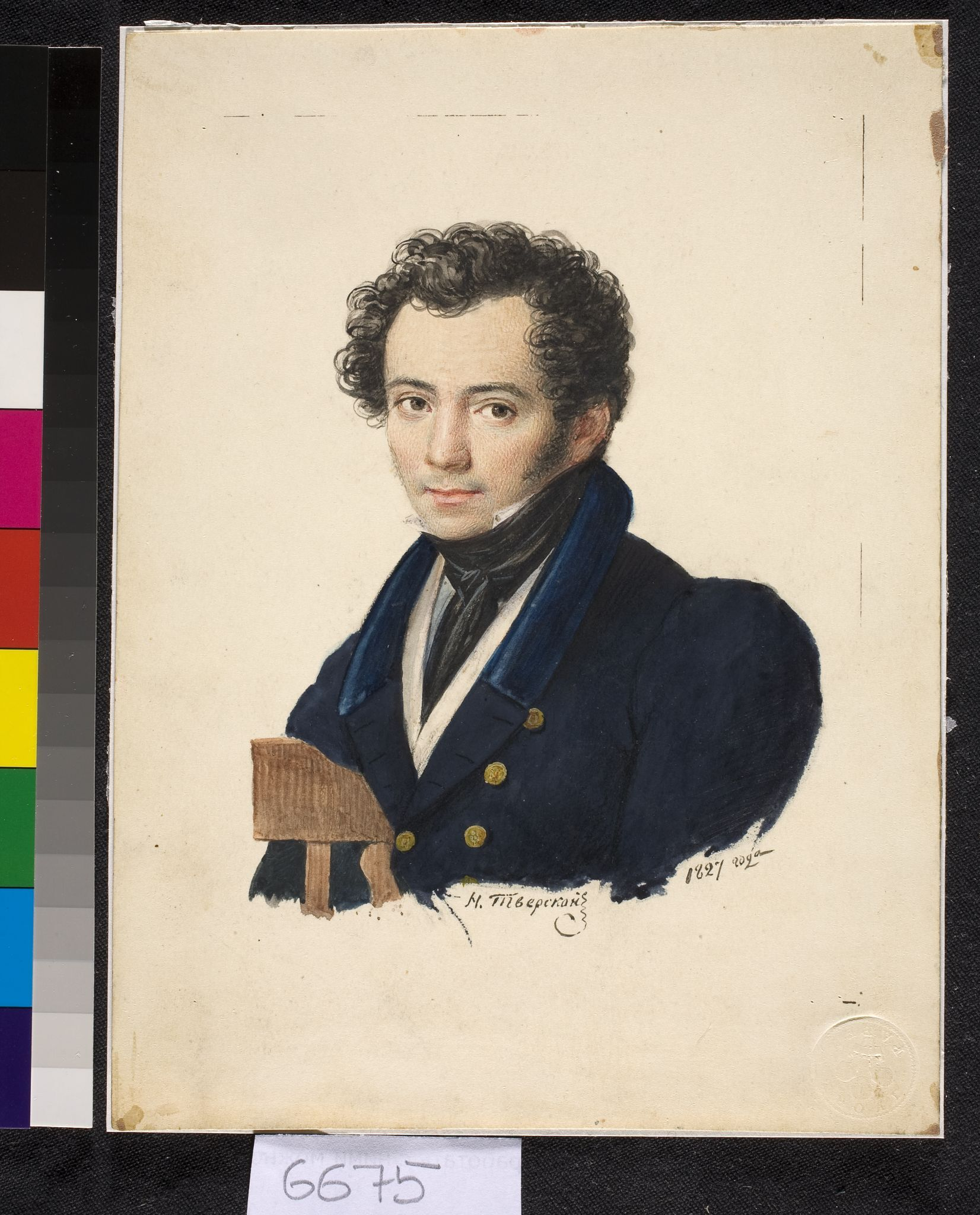
- Portrait by Nikolay Tverskoy, 1827, watercolor; Tretyakov Gallery
- Born: 22 May 1800; Saint Petersburg
- Died: 25 January 1857 (aged 56); Moscow
- Resting place: Vvedenskoye Cemetery, Moscow
- Education: Imperial Academy of Arts (1821)
- Known for: Landscape painting
- Elected: Member Academy of Arts (1827)

Karl Wilhelm Rabus, russified as Karl Ivanovich Rabus (Russian: Карл Ива́нович Ра́бус; 11 May 1800 – 14 January 1857) was a Russian painter and draughtsman during the Romantic period, active in St. Petersburg and then in Moscow, best known for his landscapes.

His father died when Karl was seven. At the age of only ten, he was sent to study at the Imperial Academy of Arts; remaining there until 1821, when he received a small gold medal and a second-degree certificate.

Crimea became one of his favorite places to paint. There, he created the works necessary for him to obtain the title of "Academician" by painting landmarks in a manner that would later become known as en plein aire. He was awarded the title in 1827 for his canvas depicting a villa in Gurzuf, built by the Duc de Richelieu. He also received praise for his view of Balaklava. From Crimea, he went to Odessa, then spent some time in Istanbul.

In 1835, he moved to Moscow and became a teacher of perspective, at the Palace School of Architecture. Later, he taught the same subject at the Konstantinov Land Survey Institute. He also taught a few classes in the theory of colors and art history. Sometimes, he would offer financial support to his most promising students.

A painting of the village church in Ismailovo was presented at court; obtaining him the title of Court Painter. In his later years, he tried his hand at writing; producing "A Guide to Perspective" and beginning a history of art. He also provided commentary on art for several magazines and newspapers. During those years, he taught landscape painting at the Stroganov School and the Moscow School of Painting, Sculpture and Architecture. His best known student was Alexei Savrasov.

Toward the end of his life, he suffered from a type of color blindness (possibly due to glaucoma), that left him unable to distinguish orange and yellow shades. He died after an unspecified long and serious illness.

== Selected paintings ==
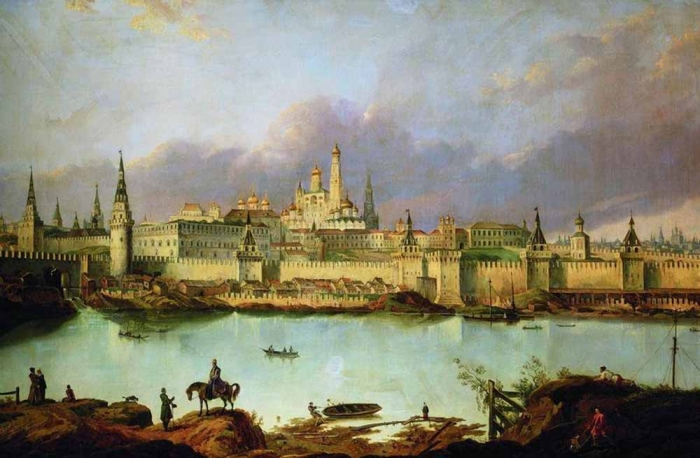
View of Moscow in the Times of
Peter the Great

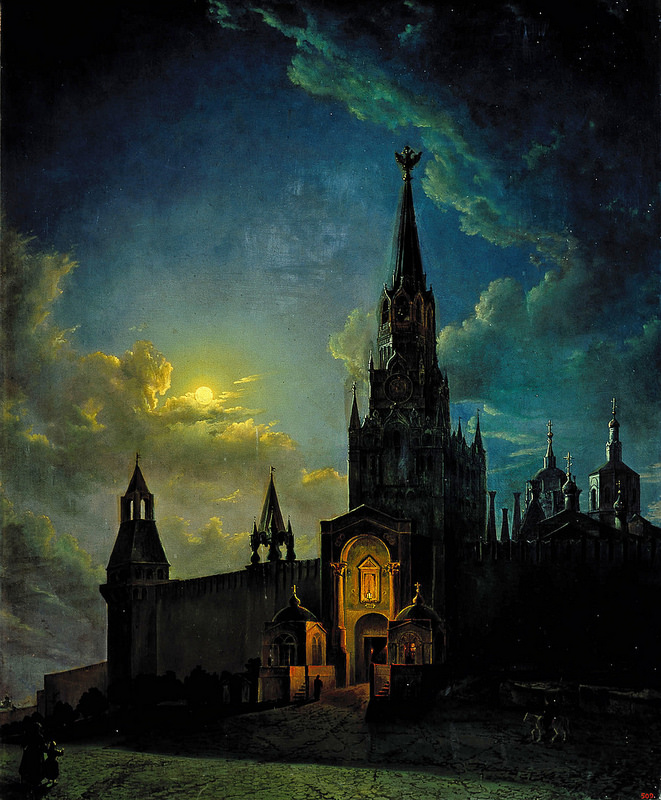
Spasskaya Tower, Kremlin

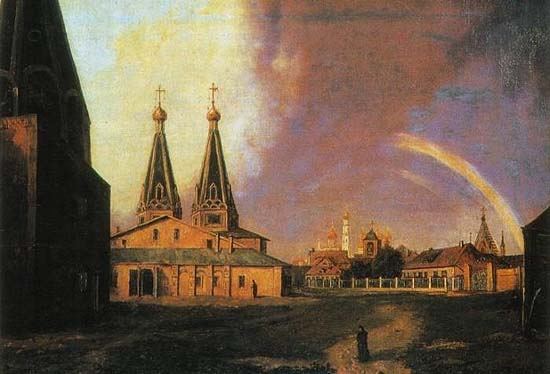
Transfiguration Church at the
Alexeyevsky Monastery

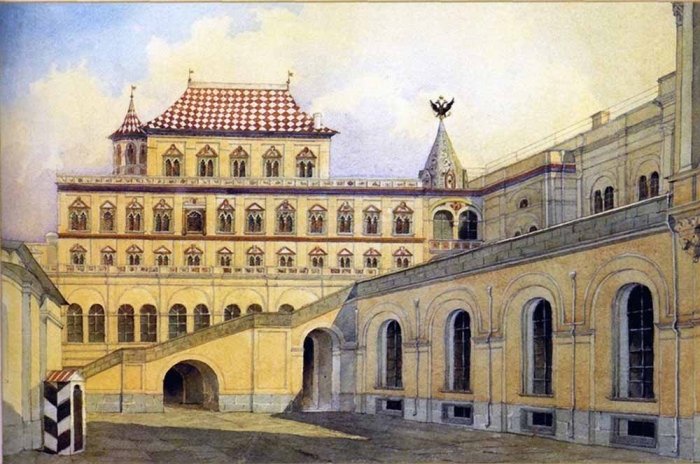
The Terem of Tsar Alexis

== Sources ==
- "Рабус, Карл Иванович" . Brockhaus and Efron Encyclopedic Dictionary (in Russian). 1906.
- Gorelov, Mikhail I. (1958). "Карл Иванович Рабус". In Leonov, Alexei I. (ed.). Русское искусство: очерки о жизни и творчестве художников. Середина девятнадцатого века (in Russian). Moscow: Iskusstvo. pp. 399–410. OCLC 174704011.
