= Alexei Savrasov =

Russian painter

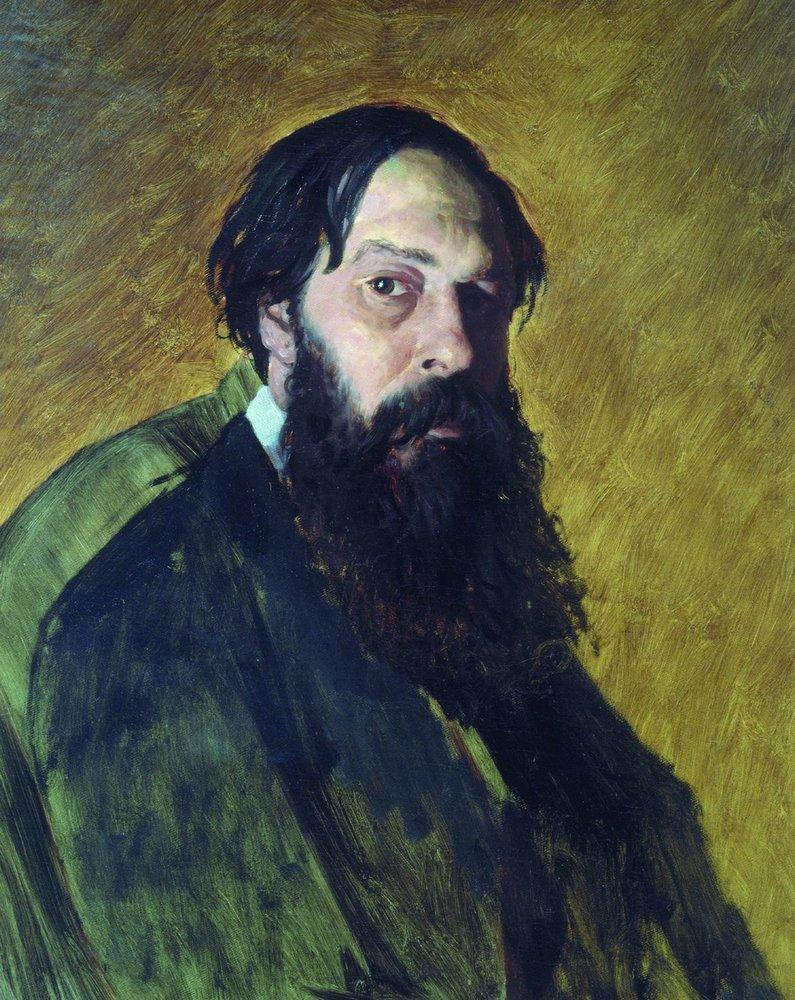
- Portrait of Savrasov by Vasily Perov, 1878
- Born: 24 May 1830; Moscow, Russian Empire
- Died: 8 October 1897 (aged 67); Moscow, Russian Empire
- Resting place: Vagankovo Cemetery, Moscow
- Education: Karl Rabus
- Known for: Landscape painting
- Notable work: The Rooks Have Returned (1871)
- Movement: Realism Peredvizhniki
- Patrons: Pavel Tretyakov

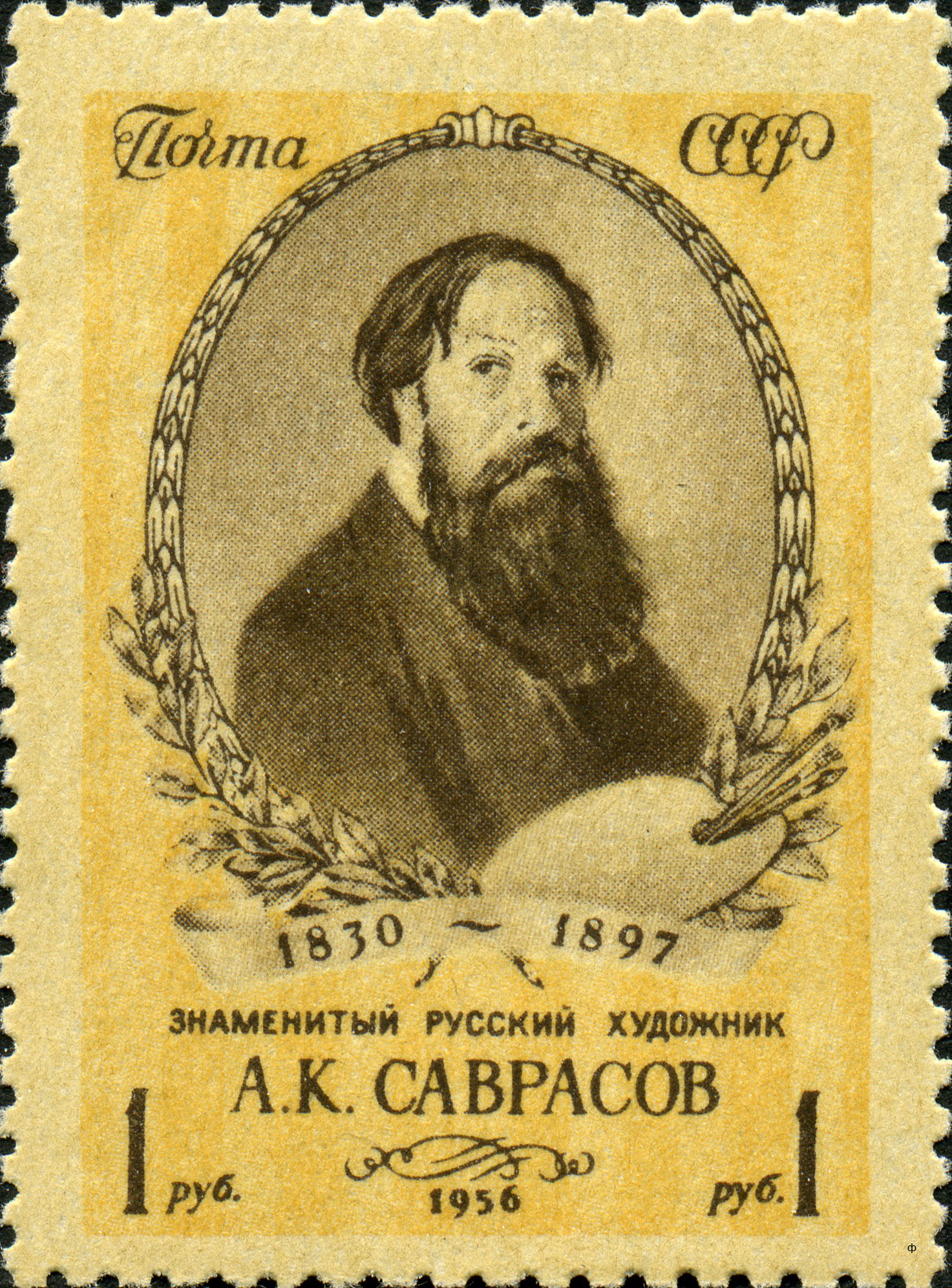
Savrasov on a 1956 postage stamp

Alexei Kondratyevich Savrasov (Note: In this name that follows East Slavic naming customs, the patronymic is Kondratyevich and the family name is Savrasov.) (Russian: Алексе́й Кондра́тьевич Савра́сов; 24 May [O.S. 12 May] 1830 – 8 October [O.S. 26 September] 1897) was a Russian landscape painter and creator of the lyrical landscape style. The most famous and a celebrated work is The Rooks Have Returned.

== Biography ==
Savrasov was born in Moscow, Russian Empire, into the family of a merchant. He began to draw early and in 1838 he enrolled as a student of professor Karl Rabus at the Moscow School of Painting, Sculpture and Architecture (MSPSA). He graduated in 1850 and immediately began to specialize in landscape painting.

In 1852, he traveled to Ukraine. Then, in 1854 by the invitation of the Grand Duchess Maria Nikolayevna, President of the Imperial Academy of Arts, he moved to the neighborhood of St. Petersburg. In 1857, Savrasov became a teacher at the MSPSA. His best students, Isaac Levitan and Konstantin Korovin, remembered their teacher with admiration and gratitude.

In 1857, he married Sophia Karlovna Hertz, sister of the art historian Karl Hertz (1820-1883). In their home they entertained artistic people and collectors including Pavel Tretyakov. Savrasov became especially close with Vasily Perov. Perov helped him paint the figures of the boat trackers in Savrasov's Volga near Yuryevets, Savrasov painted landscapes for Perov's Bird catcher and Hunters on Bivouac.

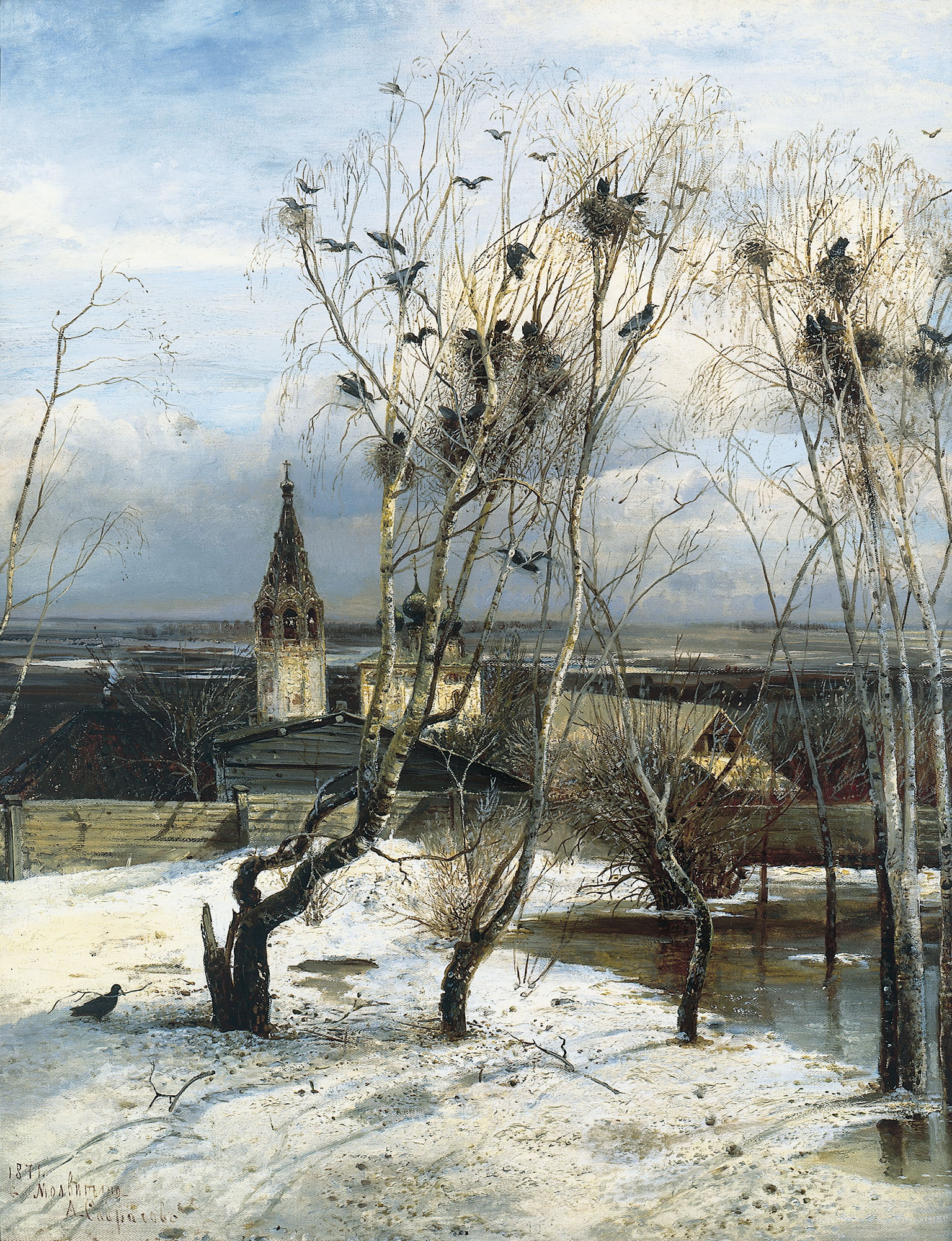
The Rooks Have Returned was painted by Savrasov near Ipatiev Monastery in Kostroma.

In the 1860s, he traveled to England to see the International Exhibition, and to Switzerland. In one of his letters he wrote that no academies in the world could so advance an artist as the present world exhibition. The painters who influenced him most were British painter John Constable and Swiss painter Alexandre Calame.

The Rooks Have Flown In (1871) is considered by many critics to be the high point in Savrasov’s artistic career. Using a common, even trivial, episode of birds returning home, and an extremely simple landscape, Savrasov emotionally showed the transition of nature from winter to spring. It was a new type of lyrical landscape painting, called later by critics the mood landscape. The painting brought him fame. In 1870, he became a member of the Peredvizhniki group, breaking with government-sponsored academic art.

In the late 1870s, he gradually became an alcoholic. The process may have begun with the death of his daughter in 1871, which led to a crisis in his art and, possibly, dissatisfaction with his artistic career. In 1882, he was dismissed from his position at the MSPSA. All attempts of his relatives and friends to help him were in vain.

His work suffered dramatically and the last years of his life were spent in poverty. He was usually drunk and often dressed in rags. Finally, he found himself wandering from shelter to shelter. Only the doorkeeper of the MSPSA and Pavel Tretyakov, founder of the Tretyakov Gallery, were present at his funeral in 1897.

== Selected works ==
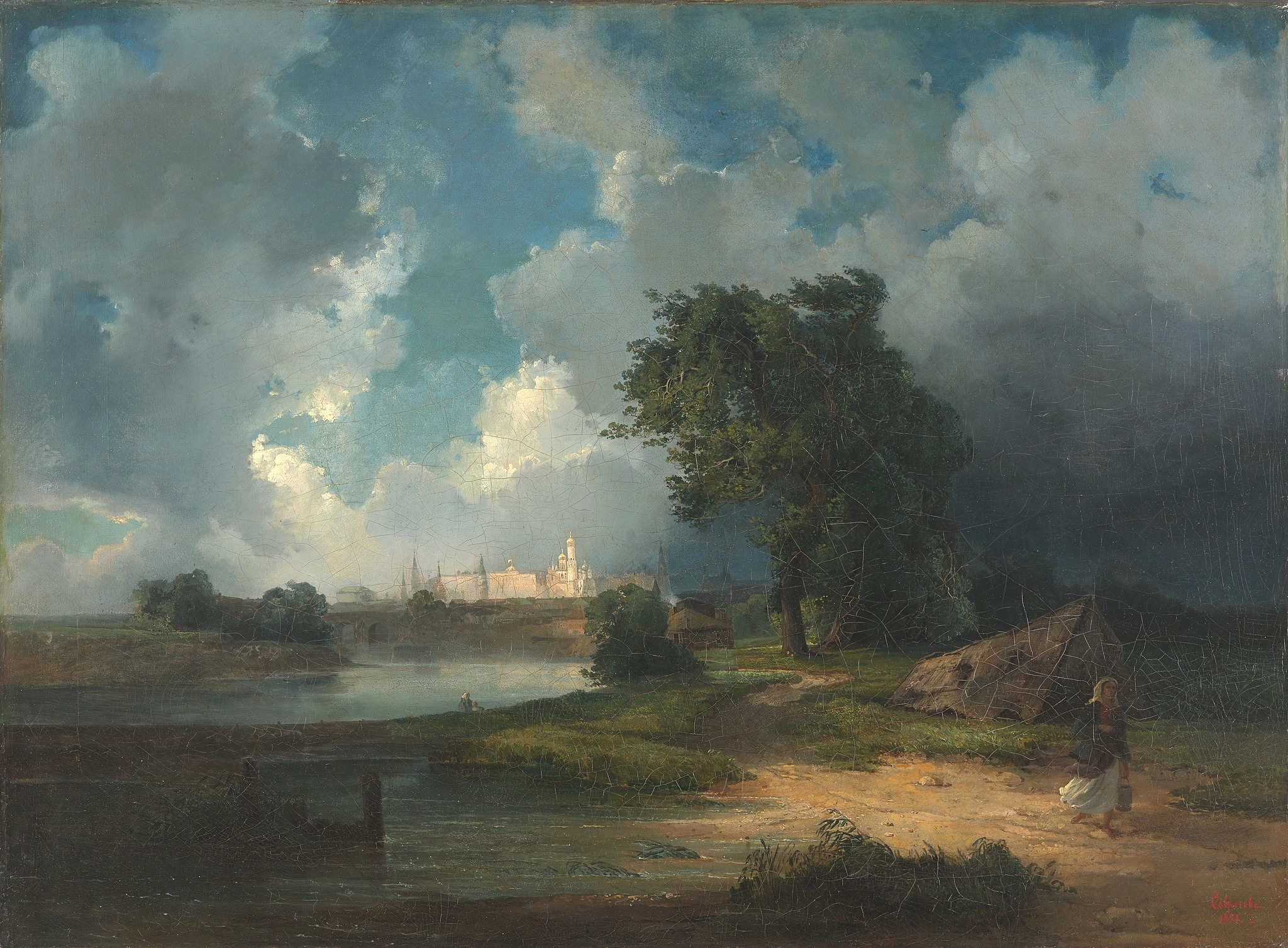
View of the Kremlin in Inclement Weather (1851)

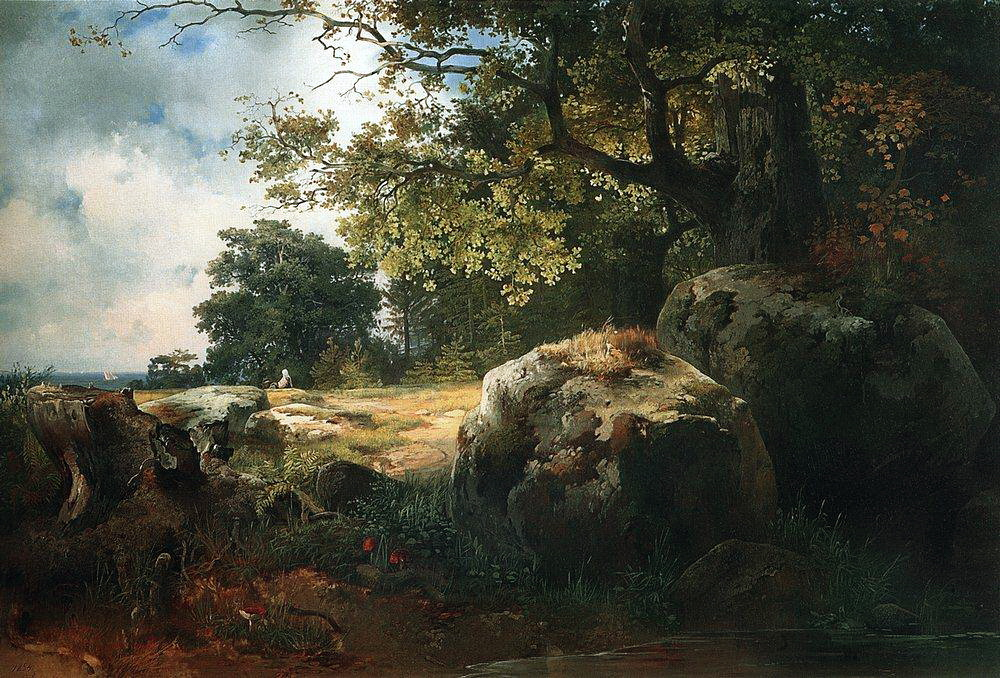
View in the Neighborhood of Oranienbaum (1854)

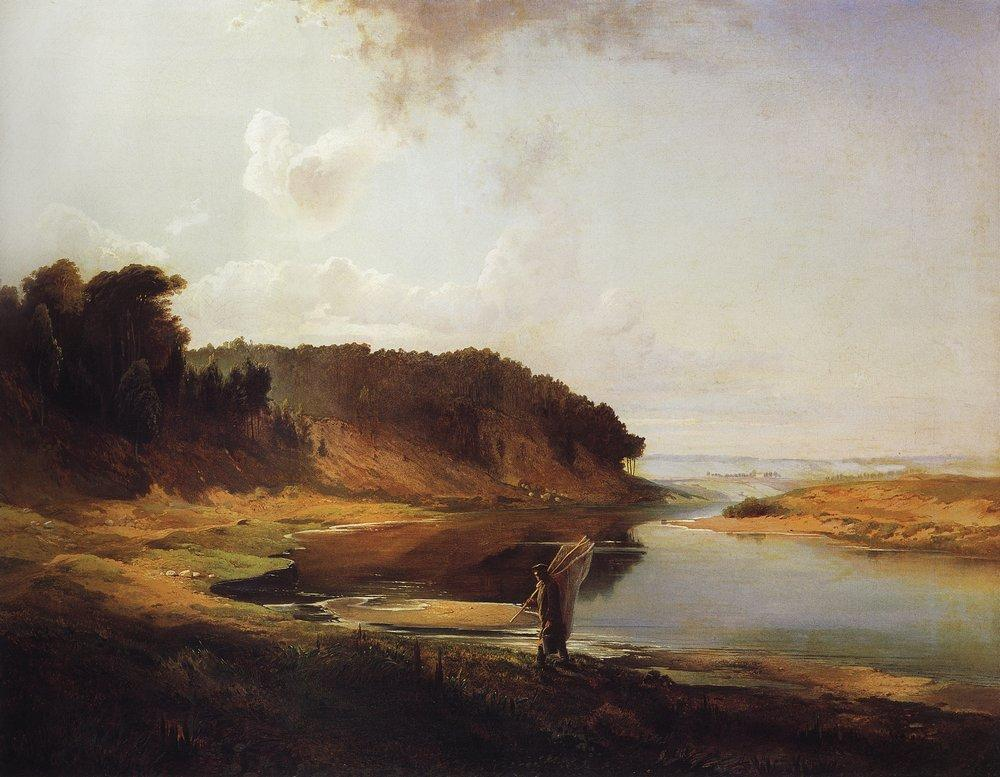
Landscape with River and Angler (1859)

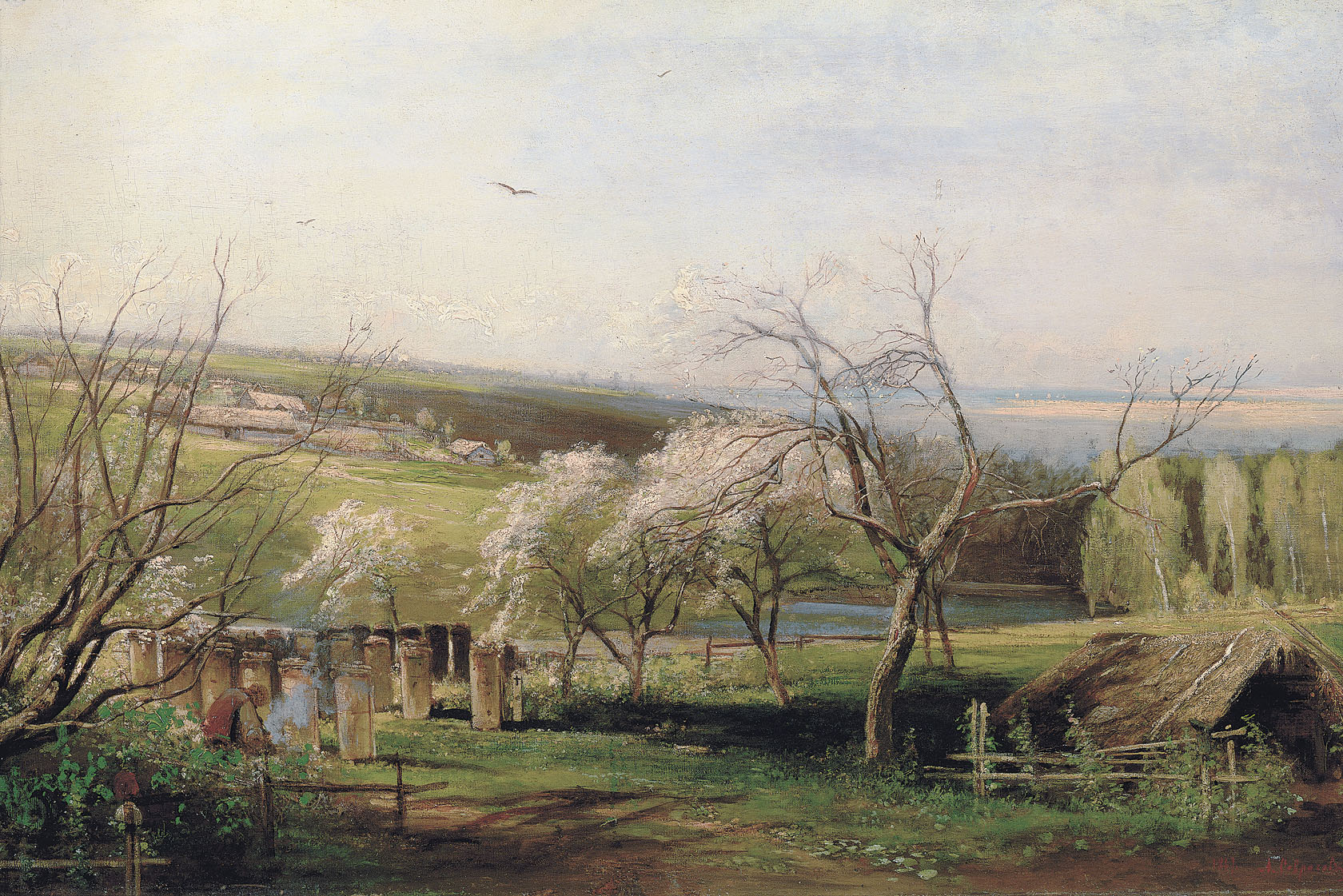
Rustic View (1867)

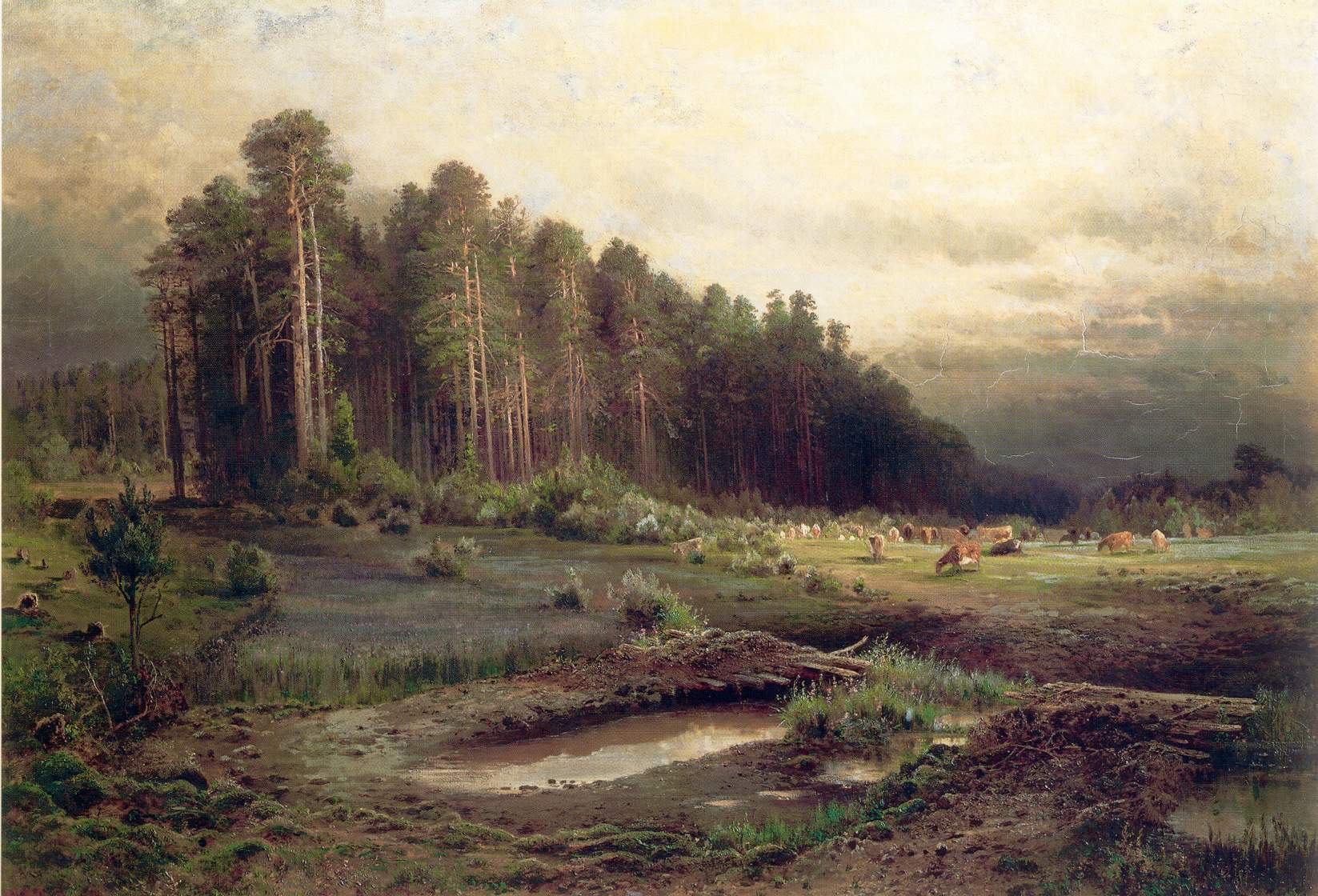
Elk Island in Sokolniki (1869)

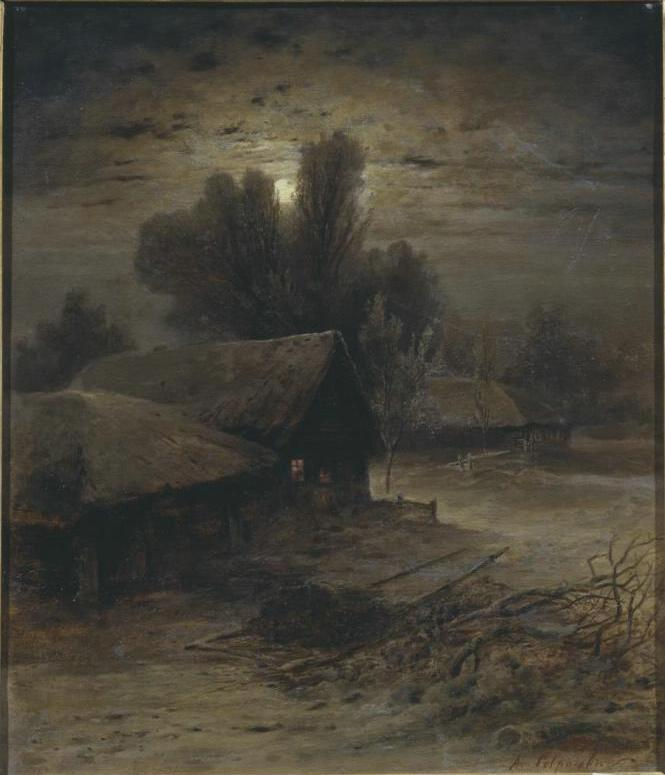
Winter Night (1869)

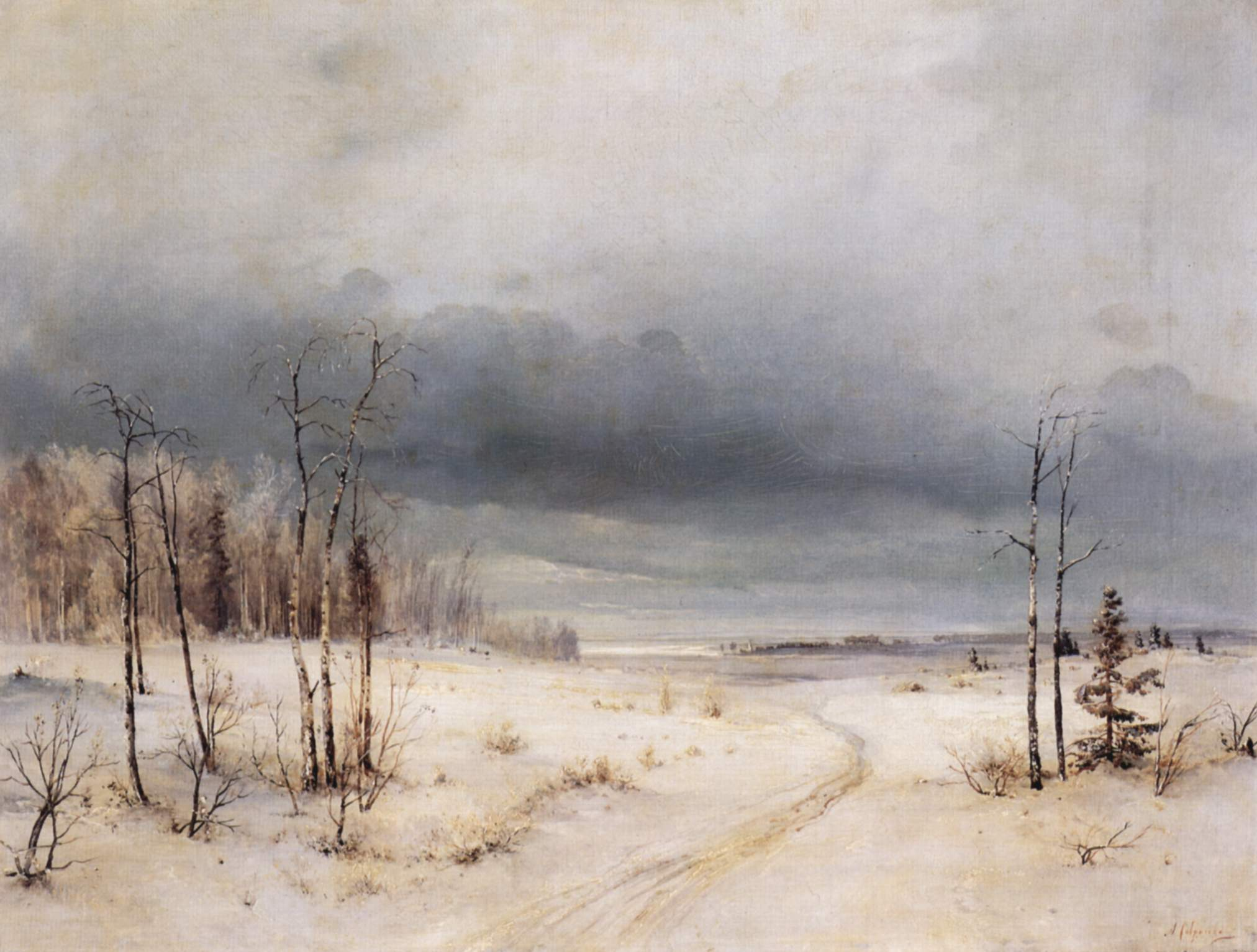
Winter (1870)

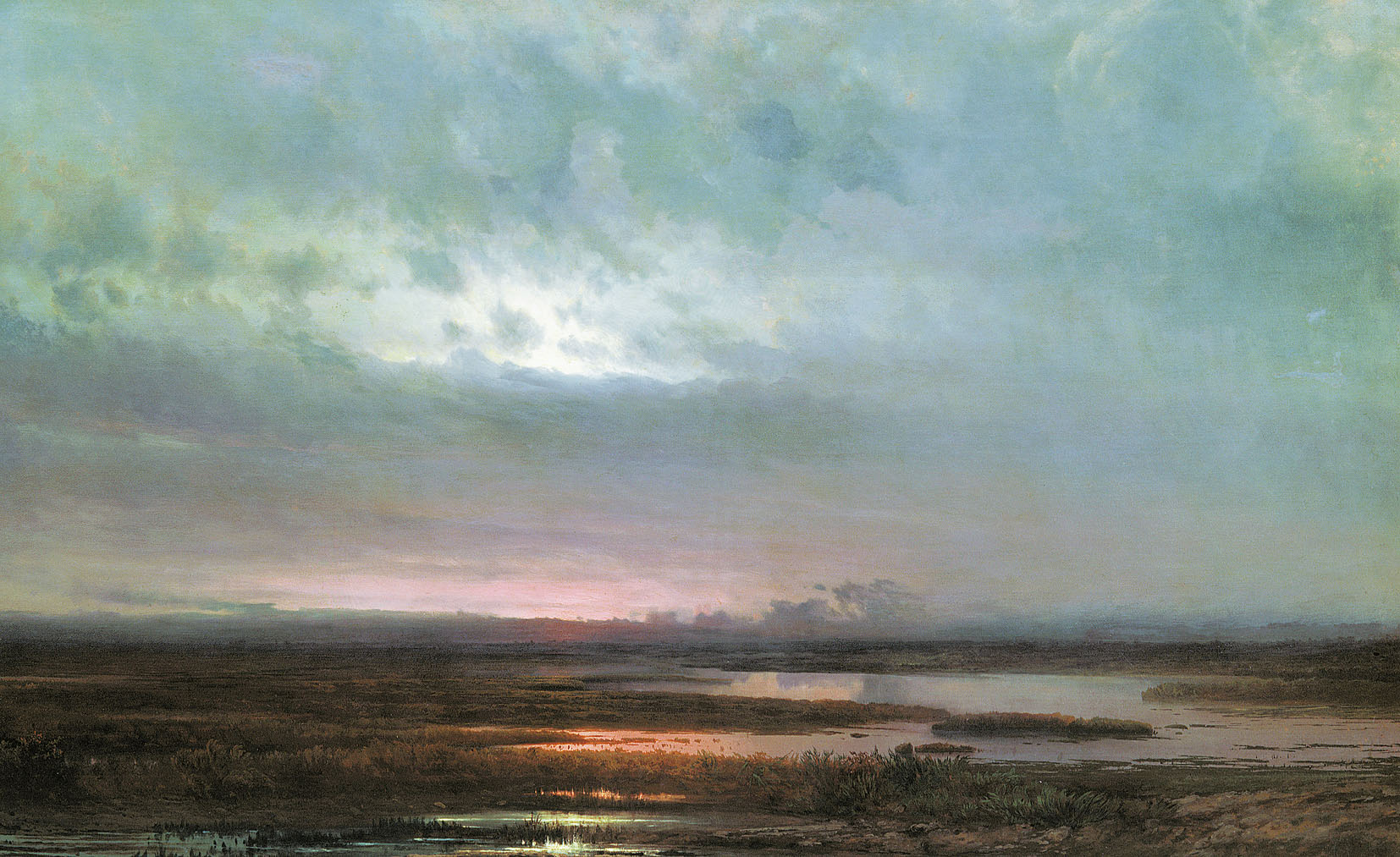
Sundown over a marsh, 1871

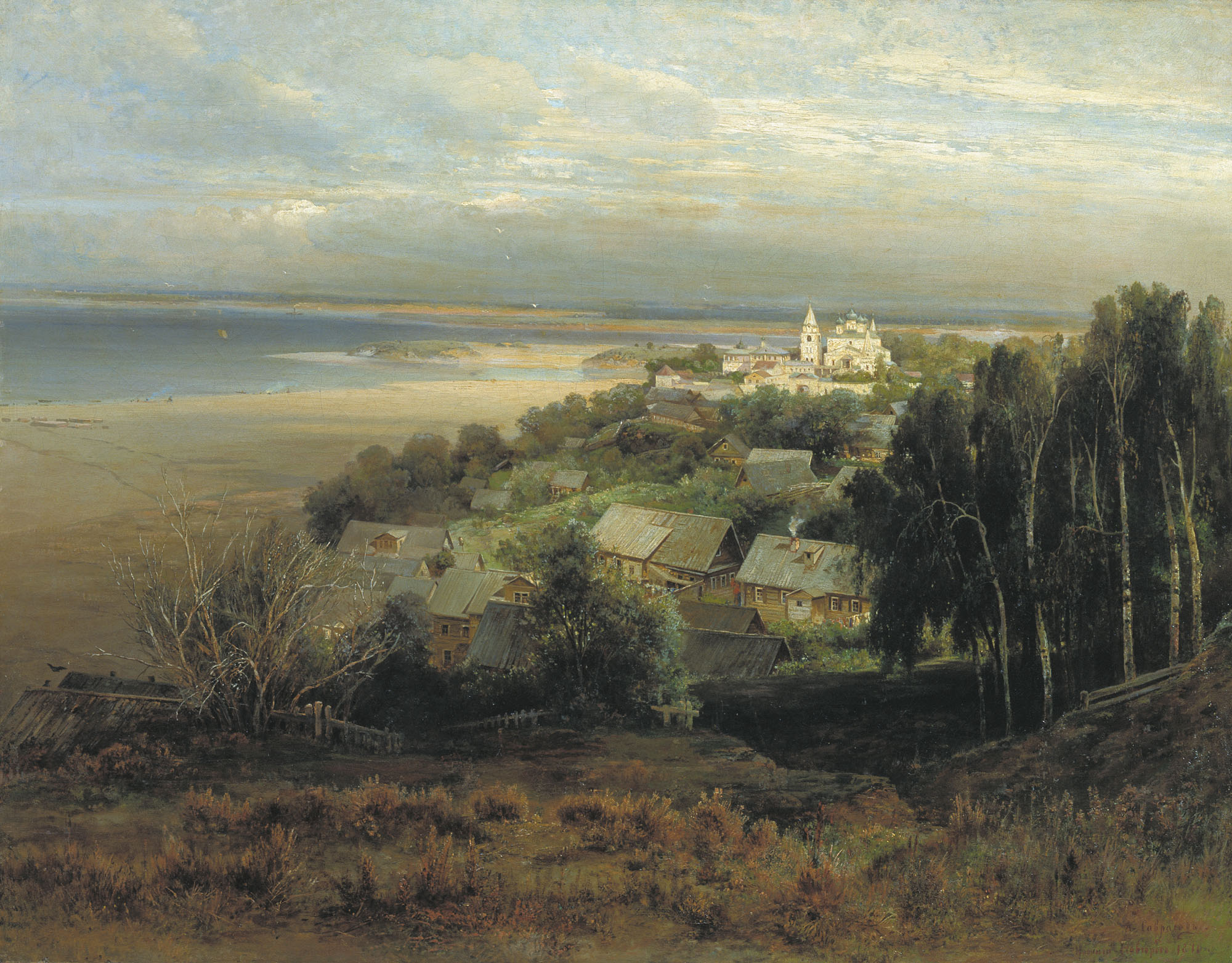
Monastery of Caves near Nizhny Novgorod (1871)

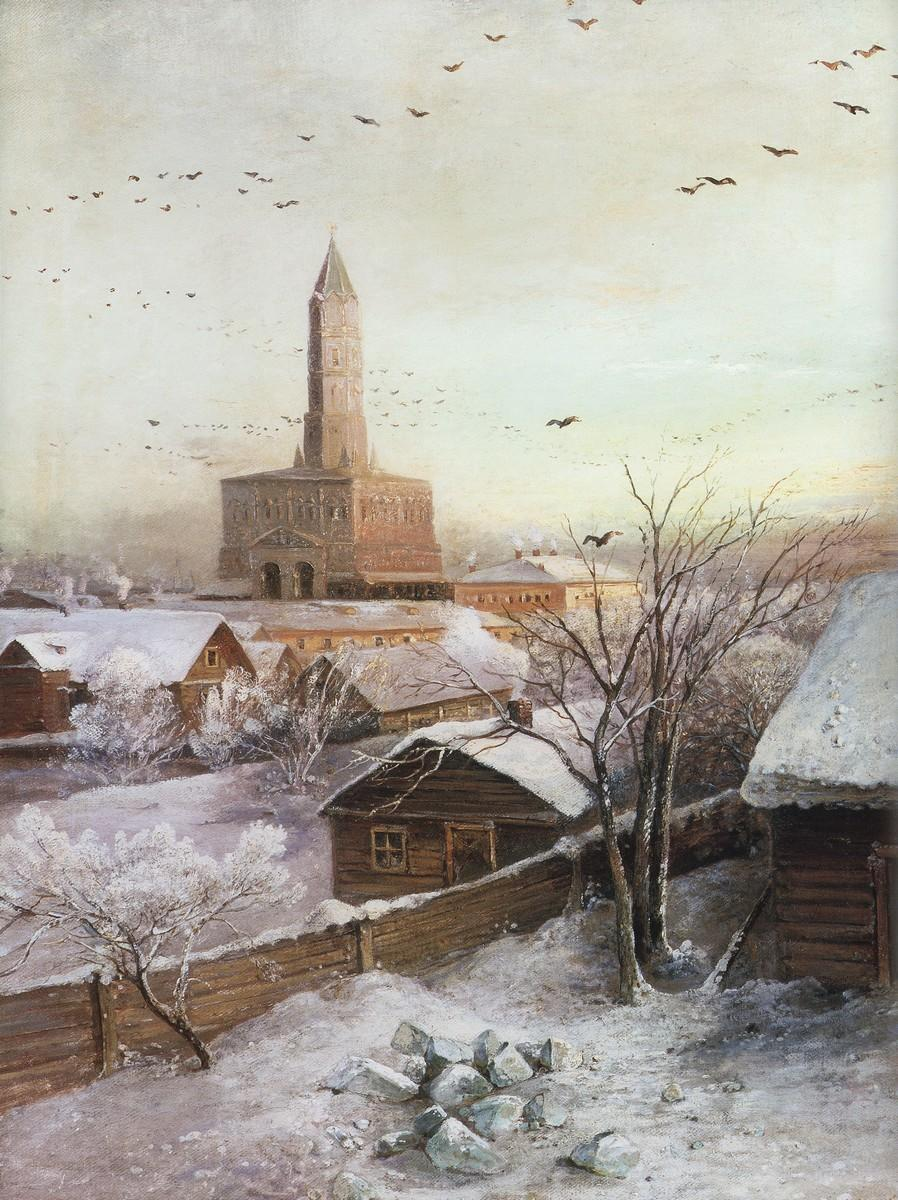
Sukharev Tower (1872)

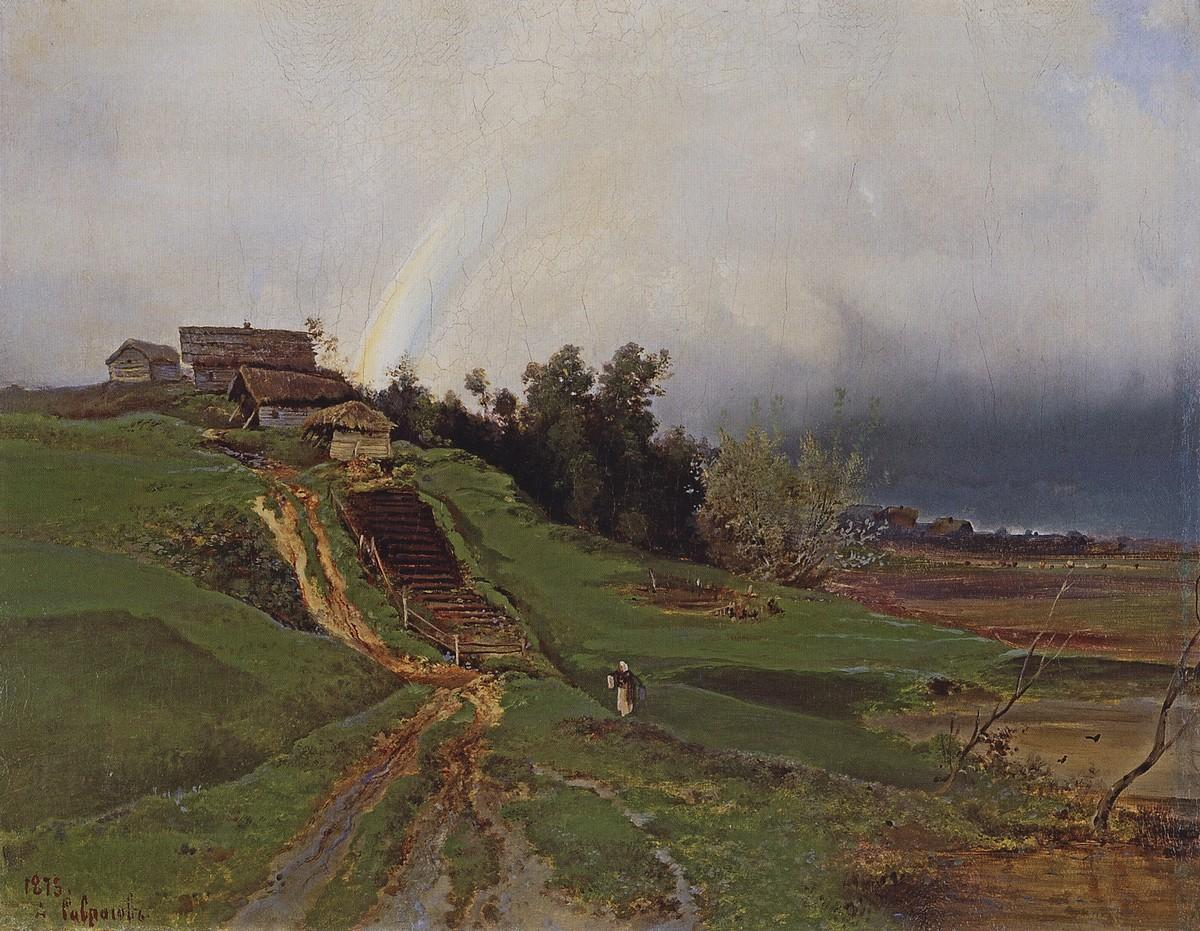
Rainbow (1873)

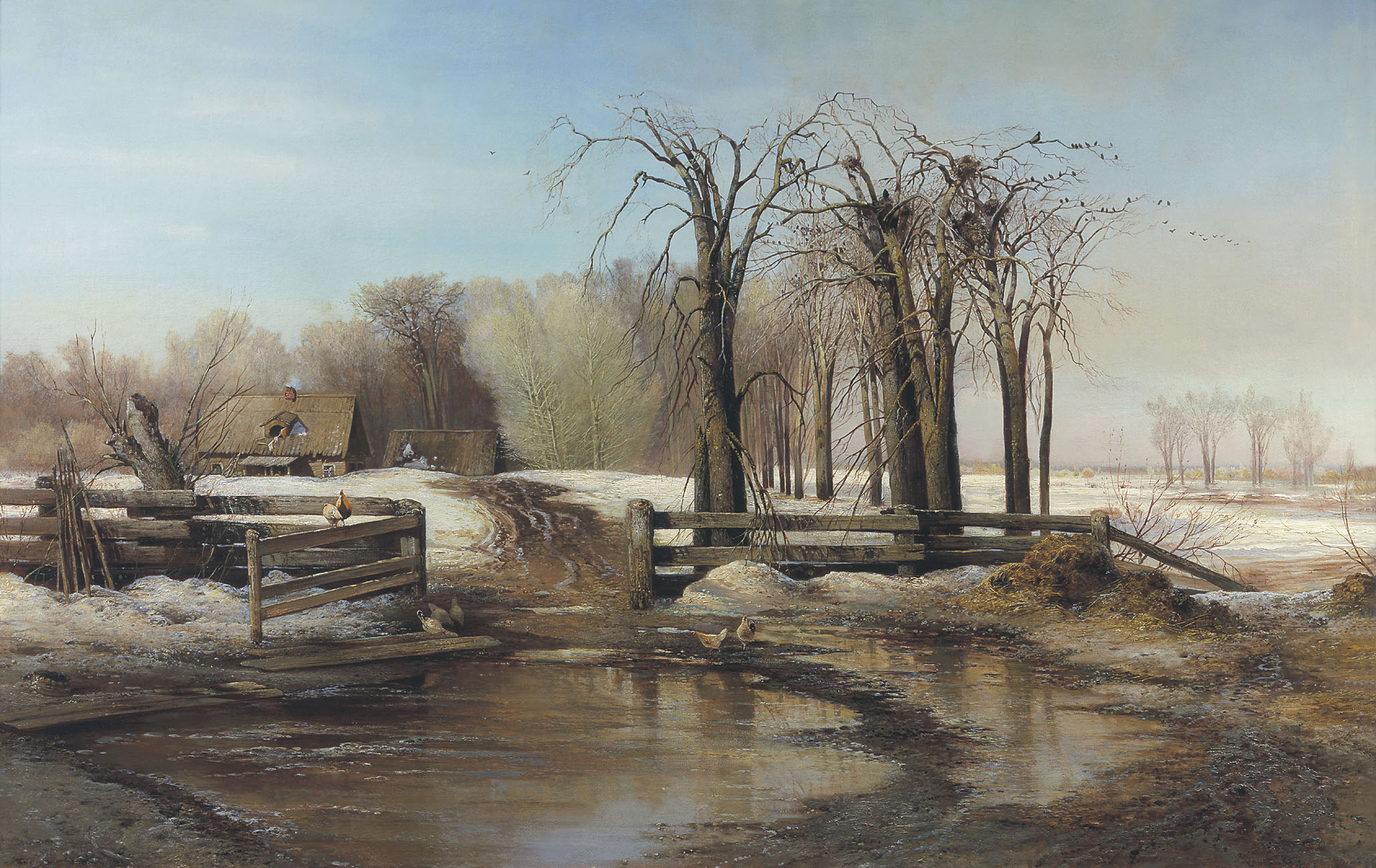
Spring Day, 1873

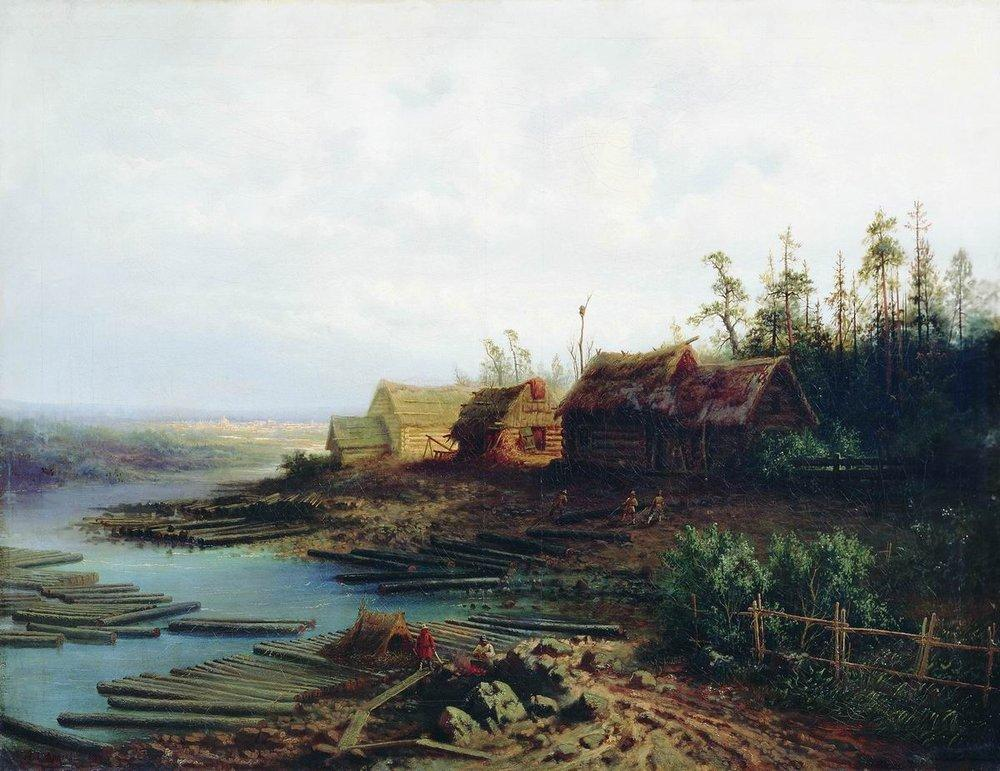
Rafts (1873)

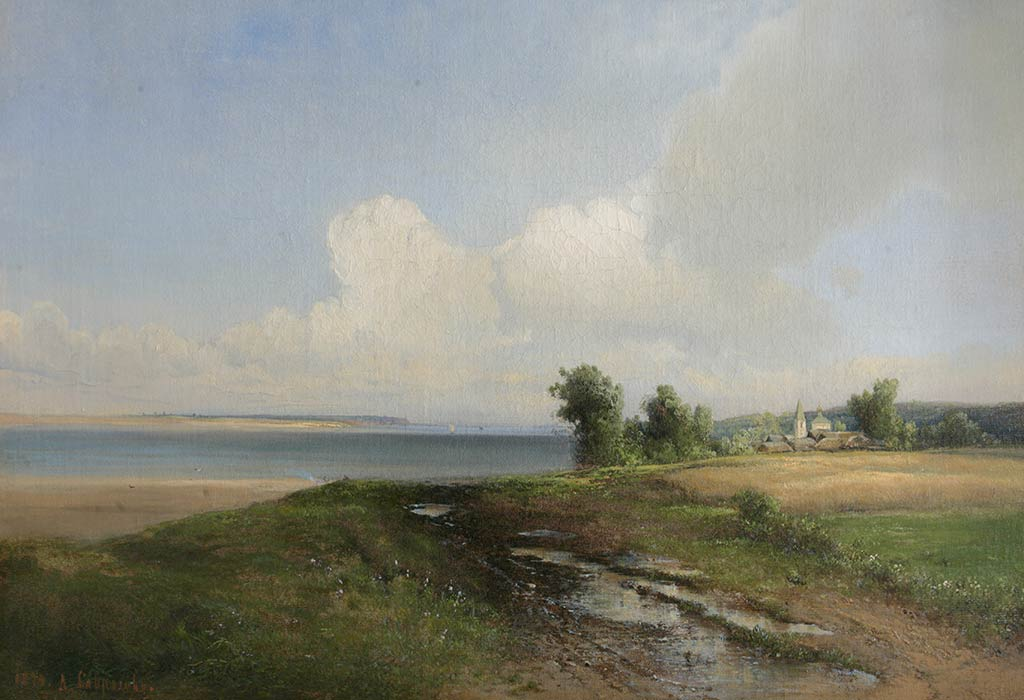
The Volga, 1874

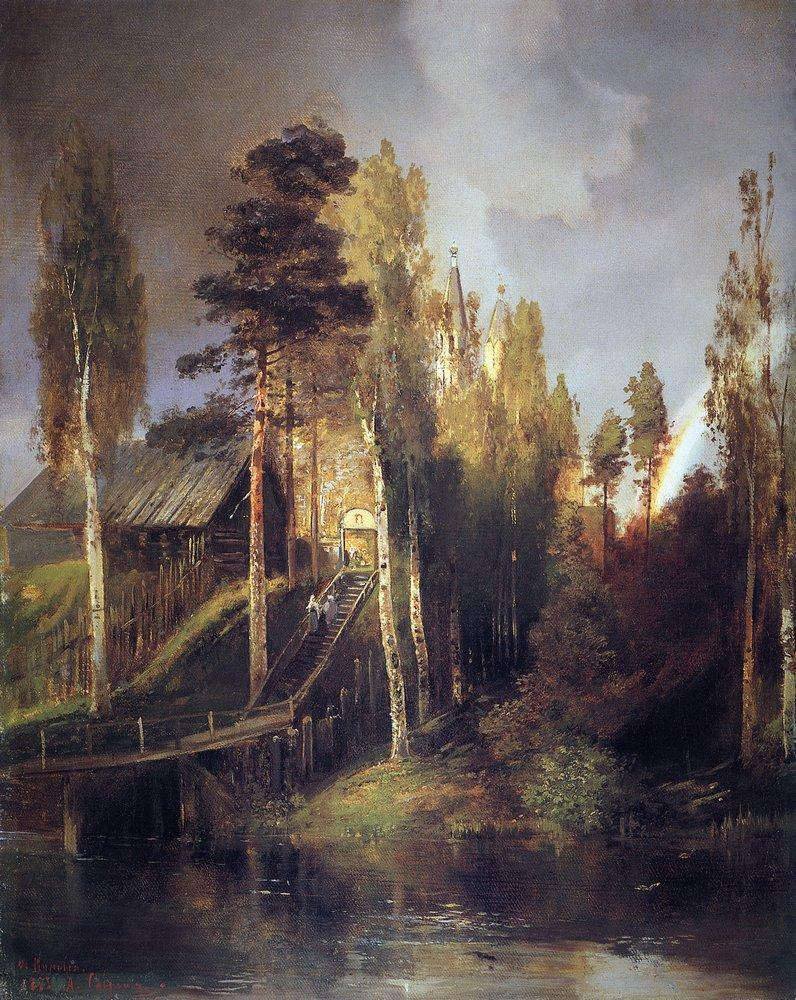
Monastery Gates (1875)

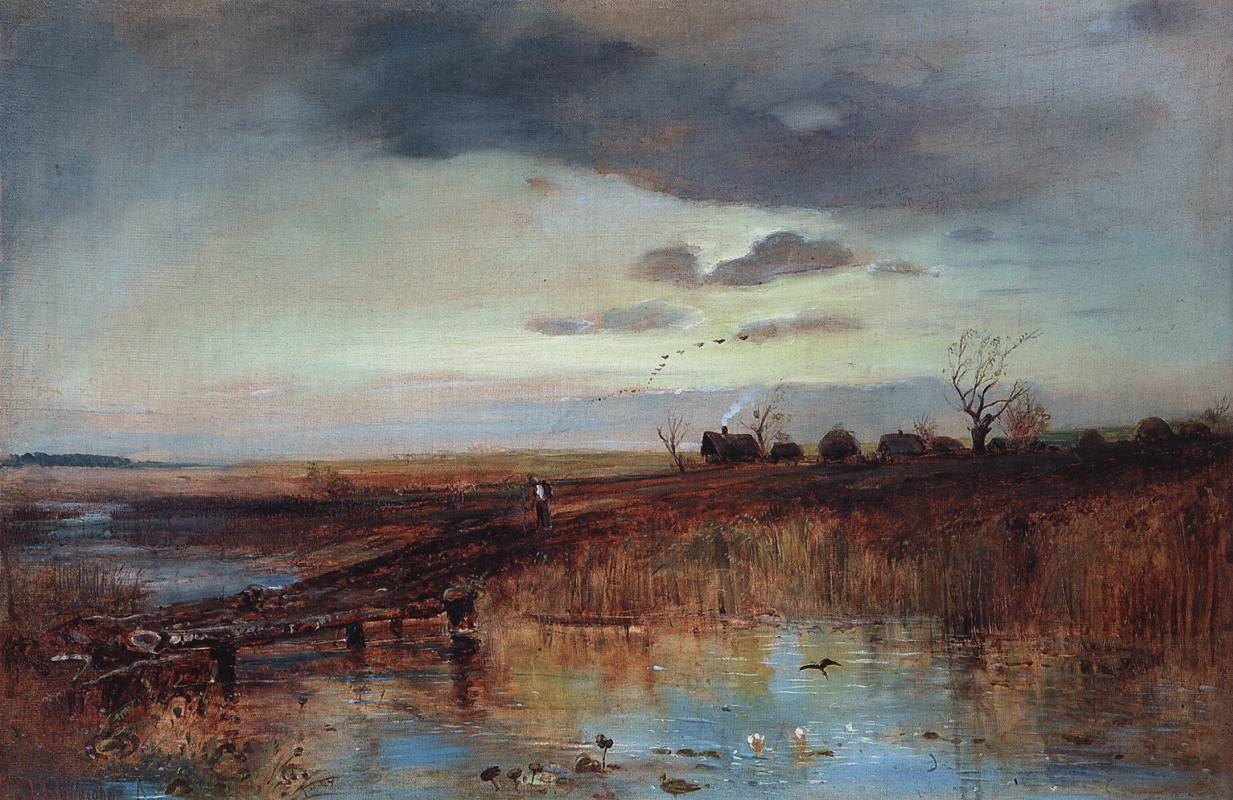
Autumn village, 1870s

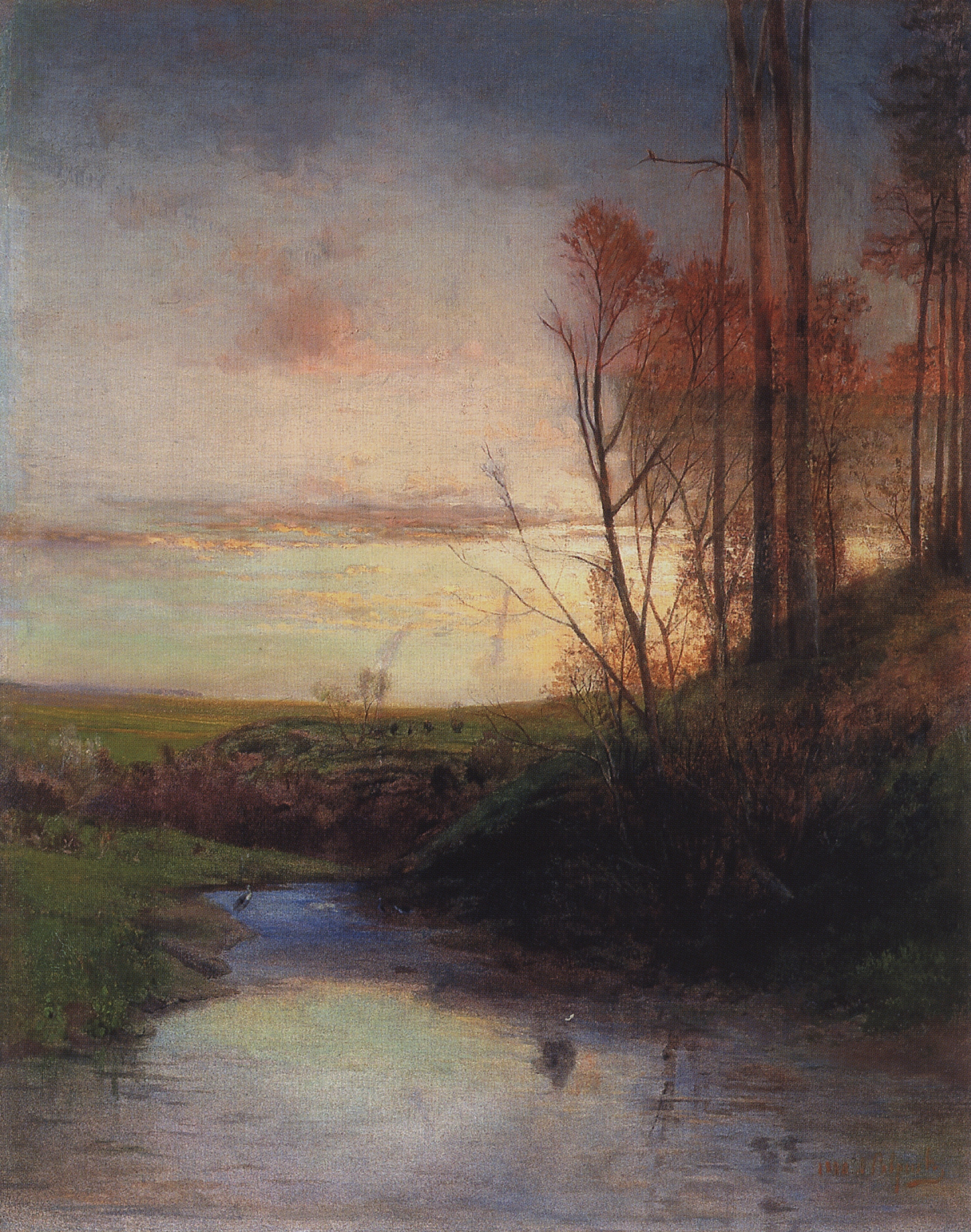
Evening, 1880

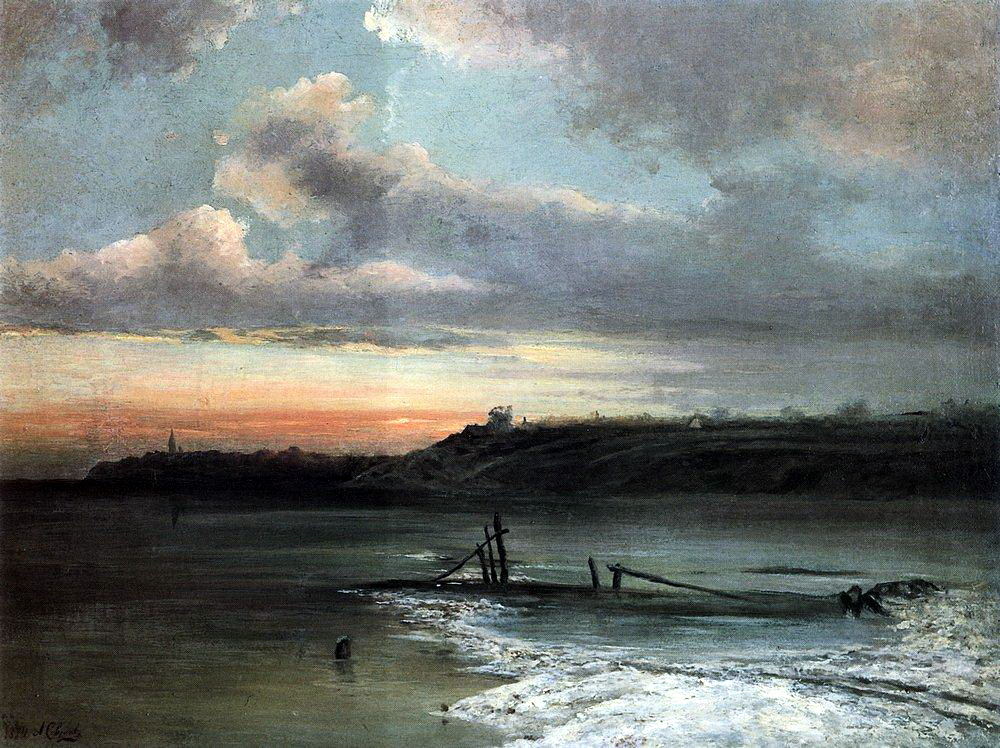
Early Spring. Thaw. (1880s)

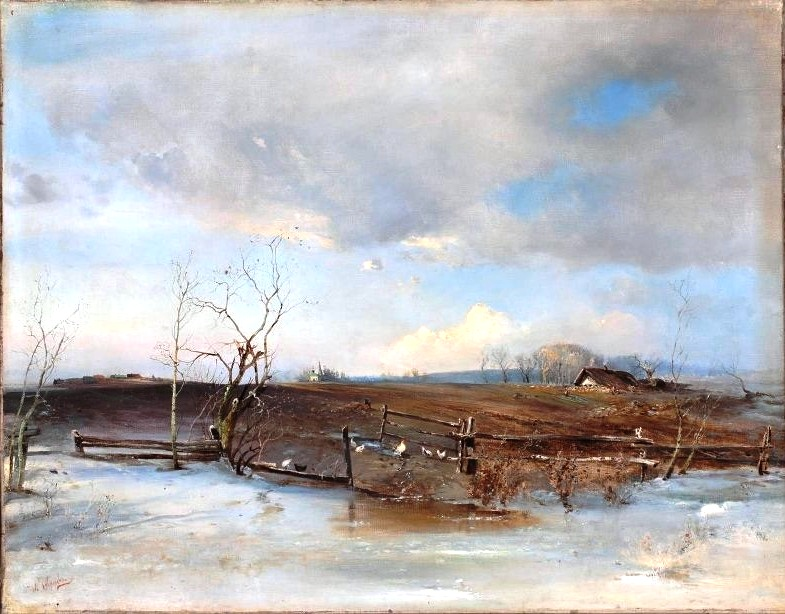
Spring. Kitchen Gardens (1893)

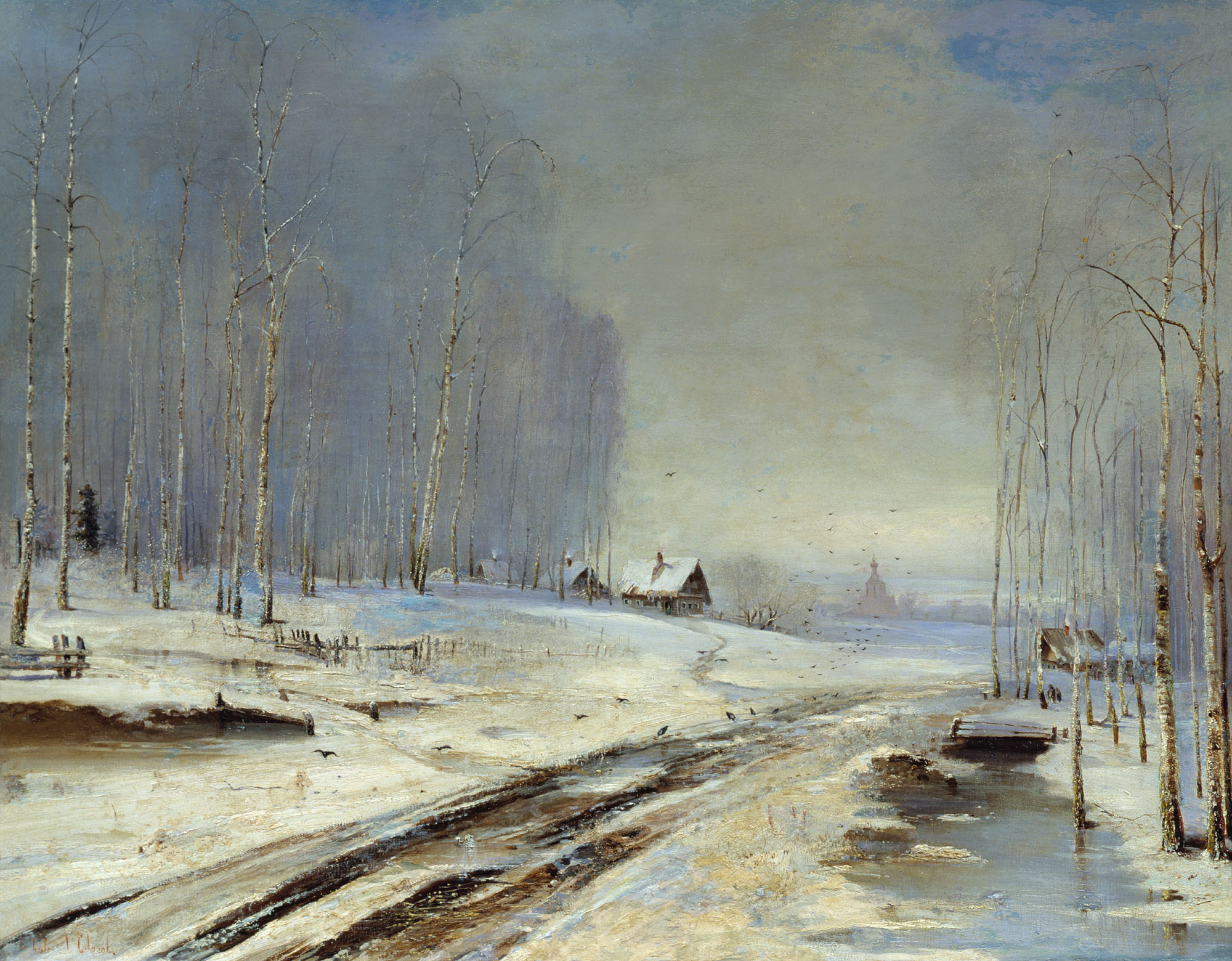
Rasputitsa (Sea of Mud, 1894)

== See also ==
- List of Russian artists
