= The Grasshopper (1955 film) =

1955 film by Samson Samsonov

- Directed by: Samson Samsonov
- Written by: Samson Samsonov (screenplay); Anton Chekhov (story)
- Produced by: Tatyana Berezantseva; Anatoliy Bobrovskiy
- Starring: Lyudmila Tselikovskaya; Sergei Bondarchuk; Vladimir Druzhnikov
- Production company: Mosfilm
- Distributed by: Artkino Pictures
- Release date: June 10, 1955
- Country: Soviet Union
- Language: Russian

The Grasshopper (Russian: Попрыгунья, romanized: Poprygunya) is a 1955 Soviet drama film directed by Samson Samsonov based on the 1892 short story of the same title by Anton Chekhov. It was nominated for a BAFTA award for Best Film in 1957.

The lead character is said to be based on Sofia Kuvshinnikova who although married to another man was until 1890 living with the painter Isaac Levitan in the town of Plyos where Sofia was improving her painting skills.

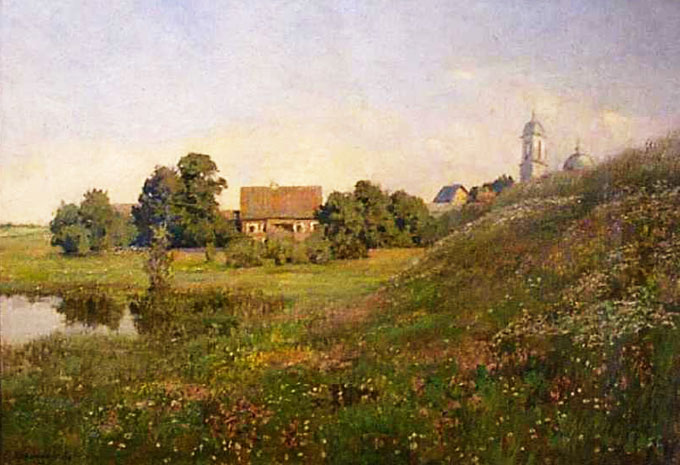
Landscape with Church, near Plyos by Kuvshinnikova - 1893

Chekhov wrote The Grasshopper shortly after this time when the couple had returned. Chekhov was a close friend of Sofia's and may have had strong affections for her. The story was a way of criticizing her betrayal, both of him and her innocent husband, and created a small scandal. According to the memoirs of Chekhov's brother, Mikhail, the situation almost led to a duel with Levitan, but it was avoided thanks to the intercession of a mutual friend, Tatiana Shchepkina-Kupernik.

== Cast ==
- Sergey Bondarchuk as Dr. Osip Stepanovich Dymov (as S. Bondarchuk)
- Lyudmila Tselikovskaya as Olga Ivanovna Dymova (as L. Tselikovskaya)
- Vladimir Druzhnikov as Ryabovskiy (as V. Druzhnikov)
- Evgeniy Teterin as Dr. Fedor Lukich Korostylev (as Ye. Teterin)
- Anatoli Aleksin
- Anatoliy Bobrovsky
- Vasili Bokarev as Bryndin (as V. Bokarev)
- Georgiy Georgiu as Uzdechkin (as G. Georgiu)
- Mikhail Gluzsky as Burkin (as M. Gluzskiy)
