= Sofia Kuvshinnikova =

Russian painter

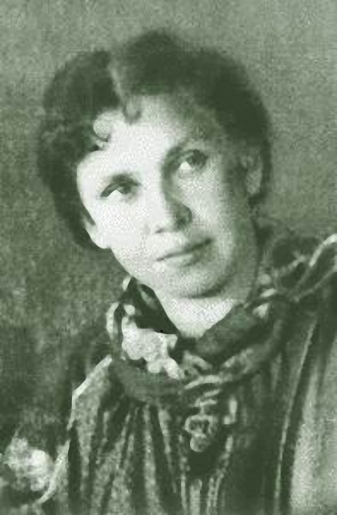
Sofia Kuvshinnikova (1860s)

Sofia Petrovna Kuvshinnikova, née Safonova (Russian: Софья Петровна Кувшинникова; 1847 – 1907 near Moscow) was a Russian landscape painter. For many years, she was the mistress of Isaac Levitan and served as the inspiration for the lead character in a short story by Anton Chekhov: Попрыгунья (The Grasshopper, 1892). In 1955, it was adapted for the screen as the first movie directed by Samson Samsonov, with Lyudmila Tselikovskaya in the starring role.

== Biography ==
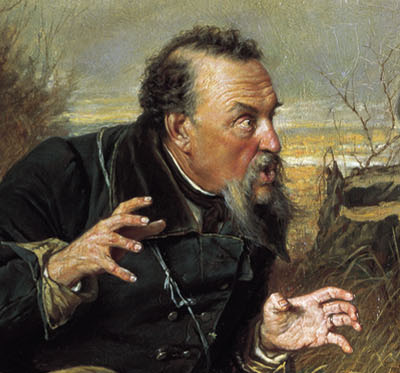
Dr. Kuvshinnikov (from The Hunters at Rest by Vasily Perov)

She was born to the family of a minor civil servant. After an education which stressed the fine arts, she married Dr Dmitri Kuvshinnikov, a doctor for the police department who was much older. In 1871, he appeared as one of the figures in a painting by Vasily Perov ("The Hunters at Rest"). This was exhibited at a showing by the Peredvizhniki and, afterwards, his modest apartment became a gathering place for the creative community; a group which came to include Levitan and the Chekhovs.

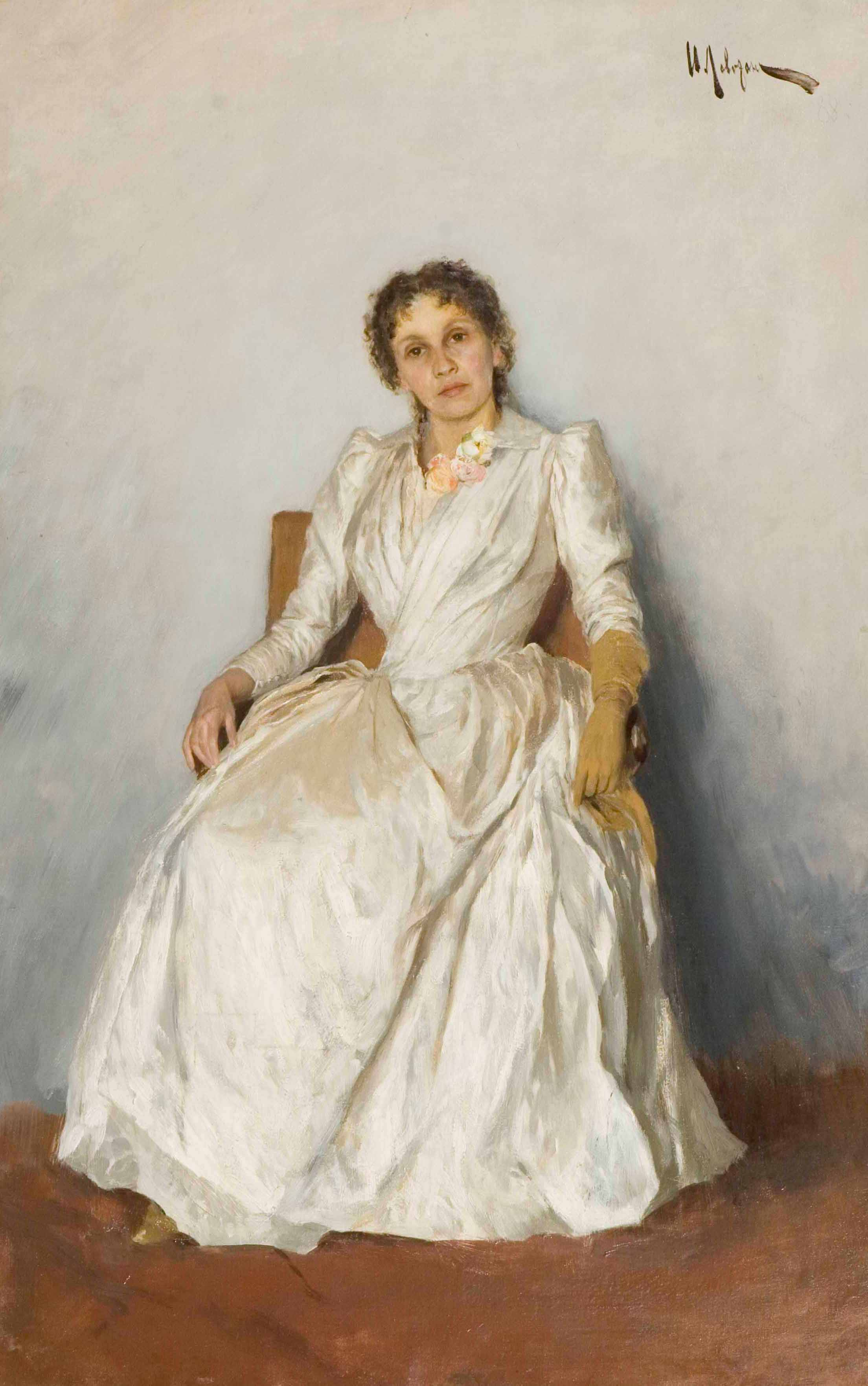
Portrait by Levitan (1888)

Sofia acted as hostess and, for many, was considered one of the chief attractions there. She not only played piano and sewed costumes, she often went out hunting, dressed as a man, and brought back a full bag of game.

In 1886, the Chekhov brothers introduced Levitan to the Kuvshinnikovs. Levitan considered himself to be a "ladies' man" and he soon fixed his sights on Sofia, although she was thirteen years his senior. Often, he would bring his art materials and paint while she played piano. In 1888 he, Sofia, and Alexei Stepanov took a steam trip on the Volga. They found themselves attracted to the town of Plyos and decided to stay. They remained until 1890. It was there she studied with him and improved her amateur painting skills.

The Grasshopper dates from shortly after this time. Chekhov published the story in Sevyer (North), issues one and two of January 1892. The story concerns a lecherous man who has an affair with a married woman, whose husband dies of an accident (that may have been suicide) after she leaves him. Levitan and Kuvshinnikova were both offended, although the central figure in the story was a young wife and Kuvshinnikova was 42. Moreover she was dark haired and a talented painter, whereas Chekhov's character was blonde and not an artist. The stronger similarity was that Kuvshinnikova's husband was tolerant of her disloyalty to him, as was "The Grasshopper" who forgave his wife's indiscretions. (Kuvshinnikov's tolerance of Sofia's infidelity was vividly illustrated soon after when Levitan was expelled from the city because he was Jewish. Kuvshinnikov interceded with the authorities to secure permission for Levitan to return.)

Chekhov was a close friend of Sofia's and may have had strong affections for her. The story was a way of criticizing her betrayal, both of him and her innocent husband, and created a small scandal. Kuvshinnikova and Chekhov's friendship ended. According to the memoirs of Chekhov's brother, Mikhail, Levitan was so enraged as to seek a duel with Chekhov, but a mutual friend, Tatiana Shchepkina-Kupernik interceded and no duel took place.

It is unclear if there was ever a formal separation from her husband but, in 1894, she and Levitan, then aged 47 and 34 respectively, settled at an estate on Lake Ostrovno in Tver Oblast. Before long, he began another affair with a younger woman from a neighboring estate and she returned to Moscow. They reconciled and broke up twice more; in 1895 and 1897.

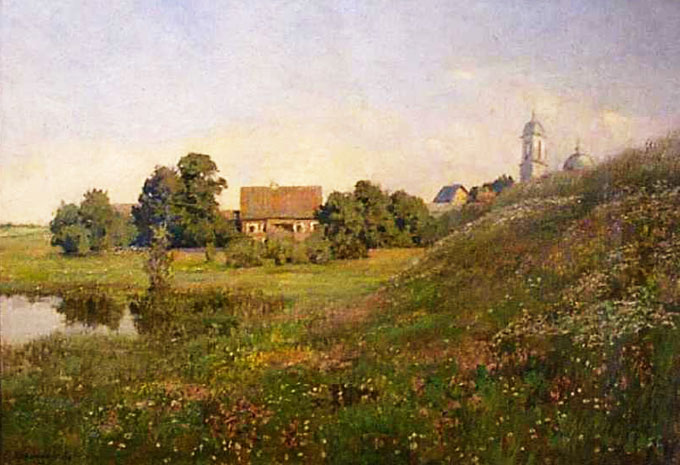
Landscape with Church, near Plyos by Kuvshinnikova - 1893

From then on, she pursued her own career as a painter and maintained friendships with numerous artists, writers and performers. In August 1907, she was visiting friends at an estate near Moscow, when she fell ill with dysentery and died.

== See also ==
- The Grasshopper (1955 film)
