= Ivan Dimov (disambiguation) =

Ivan Dimov (1897–1965) was a Bulgarian actor.

Ivan Dimov may also refer to:

- Ivan Dimov (scientist), (born 1952), Bulgarian scientist and politician
- Ivan Dimov (weightlifter) (born 2002), Bulgarian weightlifter

== See also ==
- Dimov
