= Ossip =

Ossip (Russian: Осип) may refer to:

- Ossip Bernstein (1882–1962), Russian chess grandmaster and a financial lawyer
- Ossip Brik, also known as Osip Brik, (1888–1945), Russian avant garde writer and literary critic
- Ossip Dimov, also known as Osip Dymov, the central fictional character in Grasshopper (1892) by Anton Chekhov
- Ossip Gabrilowitsch (1878–1936), Russian-born American pianist, conductor and composer
- Ossip Gurko, also known as Iosif Gurko, (1828–1901), Russian field marshal prominent during the Russo-Turkish War (1877–1878)
- Ossip Mandelstam, also known as Osip Mandelstam, (1891–1938), Russian poet and essayist
- Ossip Runitsch (1889–1947), Russian silent film actor, producer and stage director
- Ossip Schubin (1854–1934), pseudonym of Austrian novelist Aloisia Kirschner
- Ossip Zadkine (1890–1967), Belarusian-born artist who lived in France
