= Dymov =

Dymov (Russian: Дымов, from дым meaning smoke) is a Russian masculine surname, its feminine counterpart is Dymova. It may refer to

- Osip Dymov, the central character in the story "The Grasshopper" (1892) by Anton Chekhov
- Osip Dymov (writer), pen name of the Russian writer Yosif (Osip) Perelman (1878–1959)
- Sergei Dymov (born 1975), Russian football player

== See also ==
- Dimov (disambiguation)
