= A Misfortune =

- Short story by Anton Chekhov
- Original title: Несчастье
- Country: Imperial Russia
- Language: Russian

Publication
- Published in: Novoye Vremya
- Publisher: Adolf Marks, 1899-1901
- Publication date: 16 August 1886 (old style)

"A Misfortune" (Russian: Несчастье, romanized: Neschast'e), sometimes translated as "Misfortune", is an 1886 story by Anton Chekhov. First published in Novoye Vremya, the story concerns Sofya Petrovna, the young wife of a country notary, whose attempts to turn away a suitor only expose her own desire for him and drive her toward an affair. The main theme is sexual enthrallment, a frequent concern in Chekhov's work during this period.

== Background and publication history ==
Chekhov wrote "A Misfortune" for the St. Petersburg newspaper Novoye Vremya (New Times), which had invited him to contribute short pieces at the beginning of 1886. The story was published on 16 August of that year. Chekhov's association with Novoye Vremya gave him new freedom in his writing, opening him up to new influences and enabling him to increase both his productivity and the quality of his work. Russian literature scholar Donald Rayfield calls 1886 "an annus mirabilis" in Chekhov's early career.

Chekhov included "A Misfortune" into the In the Twilight (В сумерках) collection, as well as volume 3 of his Collected Works published by Adolf Marks in 1899-1901. During the author's lifetime, the story was translated into Danish, Serbo-Croatian, German, Slovak and Czech languages.

== Plot ==
Sofya Petrovna, a 25-year-old housewife, is summering in an unnamed town with her husband, Andrey, a notary. Ilyin, a lawyer and old friend of Sofya's, has expressed his love for her. Sofya asks Ilyin to cease his advances and agree to remain friends, as her love for her husband and her respect for the "sanctity of marriage" ensure that nothing will come of his desires. However, Ilyin remains enthralled, and Sofya's attempts to turn him away only expose her own feelings for him.

When Sofya finally realizes the depths of her desire for Ilyin, she asks Andrey to take her away from the town, but he says they cannot afford it. At a party for summer residents, Ilyin begs Sofya to give in to their mutual desire. In a final attempt to save her marriage, Sofya reveals everything to Andrey, but he dismisses her feelings as "a fancy". That night, Sofya departs to meet Ilyin.

== Themes and analysis ==
The primary theme in "A Misfortune" is sexual enthrallment, one of the dominant concerns in Chekhov's early stories for Novoye Vremya. It is thus often compared to other stories written in this period, especially stories revolving around female sexuality. All these stories reflect a change from Chekhov's earlier writings: whereas the early works portrayed women as the passive subjects of male desire, the stories of 1886 depict women with more agency, whose sexuality affects the men around them and drives the plot. Whereas some of the stories cast "desiring women" in a sympathetic or positive light, "A Misfortune" focuses on the destructive and tragic aspect of female sexual power. As such, it relates especially to the contemporary stories "The Witch", "Mire", and "Agafia".

Critics note the influence of Leo Tolstoy on "A Misfortune", especially the novel Anna Karenina, a classic Russian work revolving around adultery. Rayfield further notes the influence of Guy de Maupassant, who frequently employed sex as a motivation for characters. "A Misfortune" may be intended as a parody of that work. According to Rayfield, Chekhov's characterization of Sofya and the narrator's condescension toward her "betray a too recent reading of Tolstoy". For Rayfield, though the ending hints at "a catastrophe about to ensue", it comes across as unearned posturing. Comparing "A Misfortune" to the later story "About Love", Rayfield writes that the work shows that Chekhov had not yet moved beyond his influences.

== Legacy ==
James N. Loehlin traces the influence of "A Misfortune" on Chekhov's well known later story "The Grasshopper", another "study of adultery". Rayfield writes that Sofya's "half-teasing, half-reproaching" conversation with her would-be lover prefigure the dialogue between Elena and Vania in Chekhov's play The Seagull. "A Misfortune" may have influenced Andrei Bely's modernist novel Petersburg, which also features a character named Sofia Petrovna, who is likewise a married woman pursued by suitors.

Ken Loach adapted "A Misfortune" for the BBC2 series Full House in 1973, featuring Ben Kingsley. A musical adaptation of "A Misfortune" was presented at the Toronto Next Stage Theatre Festival in 2014, and premiered at the Charlottetown Festival in 2017. The music was composed by Scott Christian, with lyrics by Wade Bogert-O'Brien and book and additional lyrics by Kevin Michael Shea.
