= Lyudmila Tselikovskaya =

Russian actress (1919–1992)

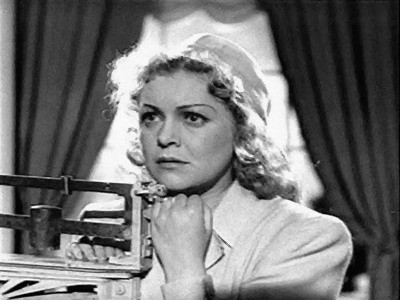
- Tselikovskaya in Tale of a True Man, 1948
- Born: Lyudmila Vasilyevna Tselikovskaya; 8 September 1919; Astrakhan, Russian SFSR
- Died: 4 July 1992 (aged 72); Moscow, Russia
- Occupation: Actress
- Years active: 1938–1980s
- Spouse(s): Yuri Alexeev-Meskhiyev; Boris Voytekhov; Mikhail Zharov; Karo Alabyan
- Awards: People's Artist of the RSFSR (1963)

Lyudmila Vasilyevna Tselikovskaya (Russian: Людмила Васильевна Целико́вская, 8 September 1919 – 4 July 1992) was a Russian actress, best remembered for her leading parts in films like Hearts of the Four (1941–1944), Anton Ivanovich Gets Angry (1941), The Aerial Cabman (1943), Ivan the Terrible (1945), Twins (1945) and The Busy Estate (1946). She was named People's Artist of the RSFSR in 1963. Ignored by the officialdom, Tselikovskaya was admired by the general public and is revered as a true legend of the Soviet War time cinema.

== Biography ==
Lyudmila Vasilyevna Tselikovskaya was born in Astrakhan to a family of musicians. Her father, a theatre musical producer, later went on to conduct the Bolshoi Theatre orchestra. Her mother, an opera singer, also performed in the Bolshoi in the late 1920s. In 1925 the family moved to Moscow where the girl, who had the perfect pitch, joined the piano class at the prestigious Gnessin State Musical College. Despite her parents' disapproval, she preferred to become an actress, though, and in 1937 enrolled in the Shchukin Theatre Institute. While still a student, she joined the staff of the Moscow Vakhtangov Theatre and made her debut there as Clarice in Servant of Two Masters by Carlo Goldoni.

In 1938 Tselikovskaya debuted on the big screen as a Young Pioneer leader Valya in Young Captains. Noticed by the film director Konstantin Yudin, she was invited to the cast of his Hearts of the Four comedy, as Shura Murashova. As the Great Patriotic War broke out, the film had to be shelved. It enjoyed great success upon its release in 1945, landing at No.5 in that year's Soviet box-office charts. Mass popularity, though, came to Tselikovskaya two years earlier, with The Aerial Cabman, its script written by Valentin Katayev specifically for her. While shooting the film, Tselikovskaya fell in love with the fellow actor Mikhail Zharov whom she soon married. In 1943 the pair spent several months at the battle front, giving concerts for the fighters of the General Gromov's 3rd Air Army.

After the Aerial Cabman's premiere Tselikovskaya appeared in Sergei Eisenstein's historical epic Ivan the Terrible as Tsarina Anastasiya, the part initially intended for Galina Ulanova. All the film's leading actors have been awarded the Stalin Prize, except for Tselikovskaya. "The unlikeliest Tsarina," Stalin reportedly pronounced, crossing her name out. The film brought Tselikovskaya nothing but trouble: she seriously damaged her eyes' crystalline lenses during one session and temporarily lost her job at the Vakhtangov Theatre where they've lost all patience with their ever-absent star. "I have never been supported by the government. Besides, while Alexandrov enjoyed nothing but praise, Konstantin Yudin's films were always criticized, such was the tendency for some reason. I always felt that our political leadership treated me as a second-rate actress. But common people loved me, and that was giving me strength," Tselikovskaya later said.

After the War Tselikovskaya appeared in Konstantin Yudin's Twins (1945) and then The Busy Estate which Zharov wrote and directed specifically for his wife in 1946. The War-themed romantic comedy in which Tselikovskaya played corporal Tonya, pestered by suitors, all of them heroic pilots, was a star-studded affair (with Zharov as sergeant major Semibaba and Sergey Filippov a German spy) but was received coolly by the critics who accused its makers of 'pandering for bad tastes' and 'the lack of progressive ideas'. Nevertheless, it came 7th in the 1946 most popular USSR film list.

Zinochka, a sister of mercy in Aleksandr Stolper's adaptation of Boris Polevoy's The Tale of a Proper Man (1948), could have marked a turning point in Tselikovskaya's career in film, but her dramatic performance failed to impress other directors who were willing only to exploit her naïve ingénue image. Discarding one script after another, the actress spent the next nine years out of work in film. Her most significant theatre roles of this period were Denise de Flavigny (Mam'zelle Nitouche), Tsarina Maria Nagaya (The Great Tsar, Vladimir Solovyov's play) and Geneura (Deep Roots, by James Gow and Arnaud d'Usseau). In the late 1940s Tselikovskaya found herself in deep personal trouble. Her fourth husband, a successful Soviet architect Karo Alabyan (whom she married in 1948, after divorcing Zharov), suddenly fell out of favour with Lavrenty Beria. He lost his job and his home too, so until 1953 the couple had to live at their friends and relatives'.

Tselikovskaya's best-known film of the 1950s was Samson Samsonov's The Grasshopper (after Anton Chekhov's short story of the same name) where she played Olga, Dymov's wife. At the 1955 Venice Film Festival it was voted the Best Foreign Film and received the Silver Lion award. Alabyan's death in 1959 marked the beginning of another lean period for Tselikovskaya, which, despite her getting the People's Artist of the RSFSR title in 1963, continued well into her old age.

In the early 1960s she became the partner of theatre director Yuri Lyubimov. "I know for sure that it was due to this liaison that she'd been denied the People's Artist of the USSR title. The Theatre several times came out with the suggestion, but for the officials the very fact of her being Lyubimov's civil wife was enough to warrant a rejection," Tselikovskaya's son, Aleksandr Alabyan, later insisted. With Mikhail Ulyanov's arrival at the Vakhtangov Theatre, she all but stopped getting roles at all, for the very same reason. One of her last film parts was that of Raisa Gurmyzhskaya in the adaptation of Alexander Ostrovsky's The Forest.

Lyudmila Tselikovskaya died of cancer on July 6, 1992. She is interred in Novodevichye Cemetery, next to Karo Alabyan's grave.

== Private life ==
Tselikovskaya married her fellow student, later Moscow Art Theatre actor Yuri Alexev-Meskhiev (1917–1946) while still at the Shchukin Theatre Institute, in 1938. Her second husband was the journalist, writer, playwright (and later Smena magazine editor) Boris Voytekhov (1911–1975). They married in 1939 and divorced two years later.

In Alma-Ata, while shooting The Aerial Cabman, Tselikovskaya fell in love with Mikhail Zharov, then a married man. Later Tselikovskaya referred to her first two marriages as 'the fallacies of youth', while speaking of Zharov with great warmth. "He loved me stronger than everybody, while I loved Alabyan most than them all," she later confessed. In 1948 Tselikovskaya divorced Zharov and married the architect Karo Alabyan, soon giving birth to Alexander, her only child. In 1959 Tselikovskaya's fourth husband died of cancer.

Lyudmila Tselikovskaya and Yuri Lyubimov's relationship started in the early 1960s and lasted for 15 years. Not long before her death the actress told her son, Alexander Alabyan: "To live with a genius one has to be dushechka, while I'm the opposite of that, always insisting on having it my own way. Soon we started to irritate one another... Apparently I was expected to sing paeans to Yuri Petrovich, which was not in my line at all… Still, we've had our good times and we parted well." Yet, much has been made of the fact that after Tselikovskaya's death Lyubimov failed to attend the funeral, or even send a note of condolence.

== Filmography ==
- Young Captains (Molodye kapitany, 1939, Valya, the Pioneer leader)
- Four Hearts (Serdtsa tchetyryokh, 1941, Shura Murashova)
- Anton Ivanovich Is Angry (Anton Ivanovich serditsya, 1941, Sima Voronova)
- The Aerial Cabman (Vozdushny izvozchik, 1943, Natasha Kulikova)
- Ivan The Terrible (Ivan Grozny, 1945, Tsarina Anastasia Romanovna)
- Twins (Bliznetsy, 1945, Lyuba Karasyova)
- A Noisy Household (Bespokoynoye khozyaistvo, 1946, corporal Tonya Lalmykova)
- Tale of a True Man (Povest o nastoyashchem tcheloveke, 1948, Zinochka)
- Karandash on Ice (Karandash na ldu, 1948, Natasha)
- Did We Meet Somewhere Before (My s vami kogda-to vstrechalys, 1954, Larisa Levkoyeva)
- The Grasshopper (Poprygunja, 1955, Olga Dymova)
- Much Ado About Nothing (Mnogo shuma iz nichego, 1956, Beatrice)
- Ordinary Family (Semya kak semya, 1970, Korobova)
- Dames and Hussars (Damy i gusary, 1976, Anelya)
- Classmates (Odnokashniki, 1978, Popovskaya)
- The Forest (Les, 1980, Raisa Gurmyzhskaya)
- The Fantastic Bet (Neveroyatnoye pari, 1984, Madam Brykovich)
- The Portrait (Portret, 1987, a stout dame)
- Repetitor (1987, Ksenya Zamyatina)
