= Dimov =

Dimov may refer to:

- Dimov (surname)
- Ivan Dimov (village) in Bulgaria
- Dimov Gate in Antarctica
