= The Grasshopper (short story) =

- Short story by Anton Chekhov
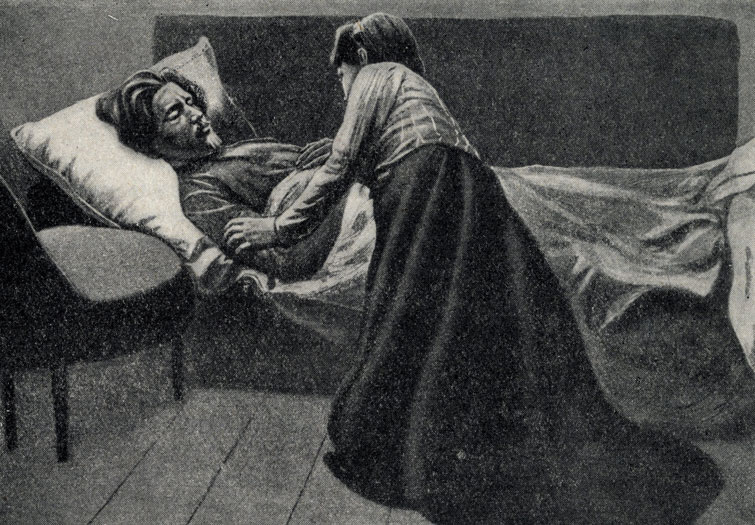
- 1904 illustration by Ivan Bodyansky
- Original title: Попрыгунья
- Country: Russia
- Language: Russian

Publication
- Published in: Sever magazine (1892)
- Publisher: Adolf Marks (1901)
- Publication date: January 1892

"The Grasshopper" (Russian: Попрыгунья, romanized: Poprygunya) is an 1892 short story by Anton Chekhov.

== Background and publication history ==
On 12 September 1891 Viktor Tikhonov, who had just become the editor-in-chief of Sever, asked Chekhov in a letter to write a story for his magazine. Chekhov agreed but in an 11 October letter informed Tikhonov that he had not yet decided on either story's title or even what it would be about, telling him, "you can [promise the subscribers] something that will be called either 'A Story' or 'Ordinary People', both would be spot on."

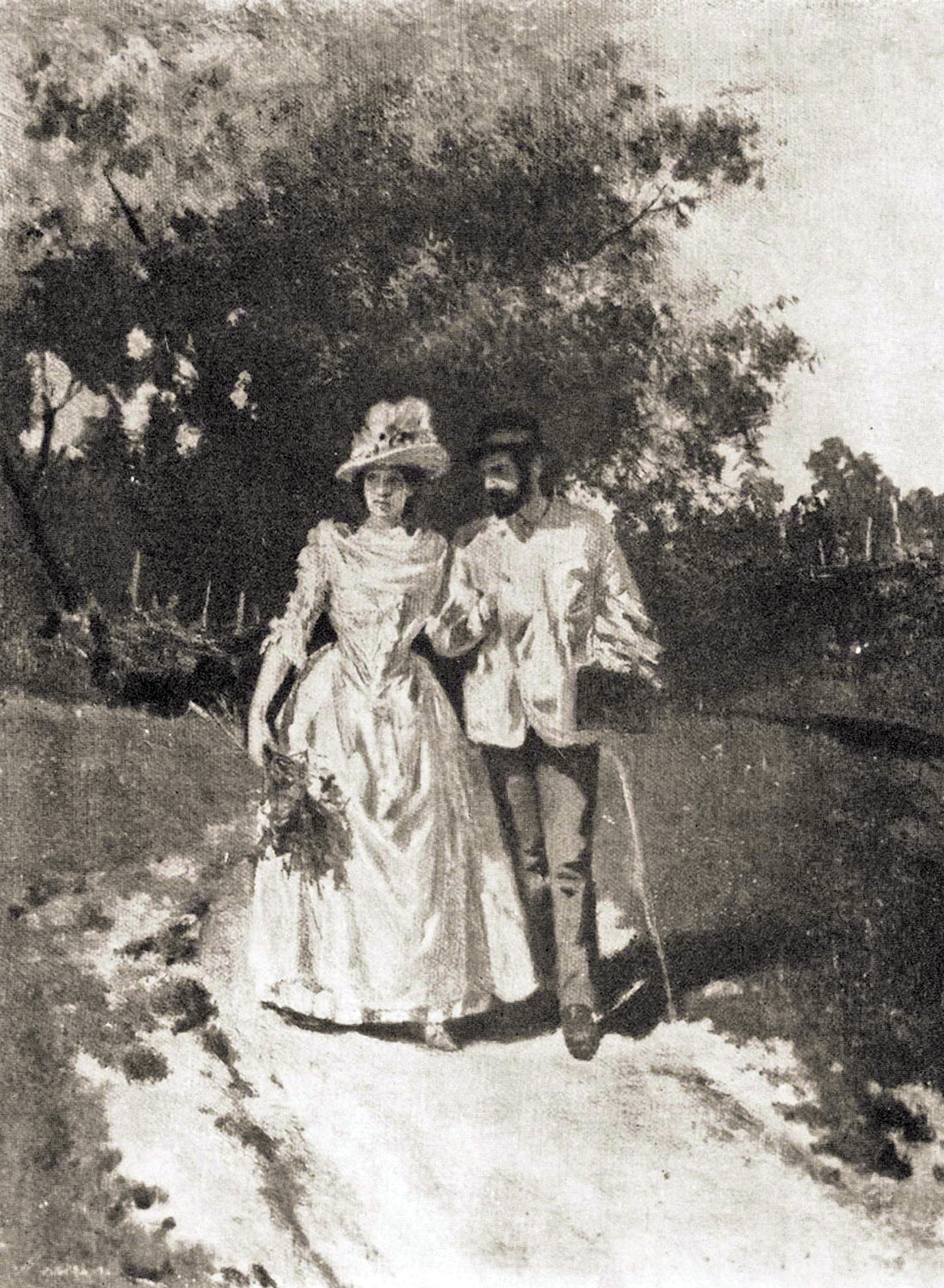
Levitan and Kuvshinnikova by Alexey Stepanov

Chekhov set out to work on it on 21 November. James N. Loehlin writes that the story was influenced by Chekhov's earlier story "A Misfortune", which likewise told a tale of adultery. On 30 November he sent Tikhonov the manuscript of the story, originally titled "The Great Man" (Великий человек, Velikiy chelovek). In an accompanying note he wrote: "Hereby I send you a little touching novel for a family reading. That's the promised 'Ordinary People', but now re-named." This new title apparently did not satisfy him. After having read the proofs, he wrote Tikhonov on 14 December: "Really, I don't know what to do with my story's title. 'The Great Man' does not appeal to me at all... Call it 'The Grasshopper'... and don't forget to change it!"

"The Grasshopper" was first published in the Nos. 1 and 2 (5 and 12 January 1892, respectively) issues of the Sever magazine. In a slightly changed version it was included into the Moscow-published Novellas and Stories (Повести и рассказы), 1894 collection, and later in Volume 8 of the Collected Works by A.P. Chekhov published by Adolf Marks in 1899–1901.

The story's main characters apparently had the real life prototypes, Sofia Kuvshinnikova and her husband Dr Dmitri Kuvshinnikov. Modern literary historians take this for granted, although Chekhov himself denied it. On 29 April 1892 he wrote to his regular correspondent, the writer Lydia Avilova: "Yesterday I was in Moscow and all but choked myself to death with boredom and all kinds of misfortunes. Can you believe it, one my acquaintance, a dame of 42, had recognized herself in the 20-year-old heroine of my 'Grasshopper'... and now the whole Moscow seems to accuse me of smearing her good character. The only proof is superficial: the dame likes to paint in watercolors, her husband is a doctor and her lover a painter."

The story's plotline is very similar to the real-life story of Kuvshinnikova's relationship with Isaak Levitan, and her husband's indeed very stoic reaction to it. The former was, though, by no means a despicable nonentity like Olga Ivanovna of The Grasshopper. Critics admired her work, one of her pictures had been bought by Pavel Tretyakov. On the other hand, Dmitry Kuvshinnikov was a very ordinary doctor without any ambitions. Critics argued later that Osip Dymov was more like the Moscow doctor Illarion Dubrovo, who indeed used to risk his life by tube-sucking diphteritis phlegm out of sick people's throats and in May 1883 died, having caught the infection this way.

Some other real people were portrayed in the story, among them the opera singer Lavrenty Donskoy, the actor and theatre director Alexander Lensky (the 'fat drama actor'), writer Yevgeny Goslavsky, and Count Fyodor Sollogub, the painter and illustrator.

== Plot summary ==
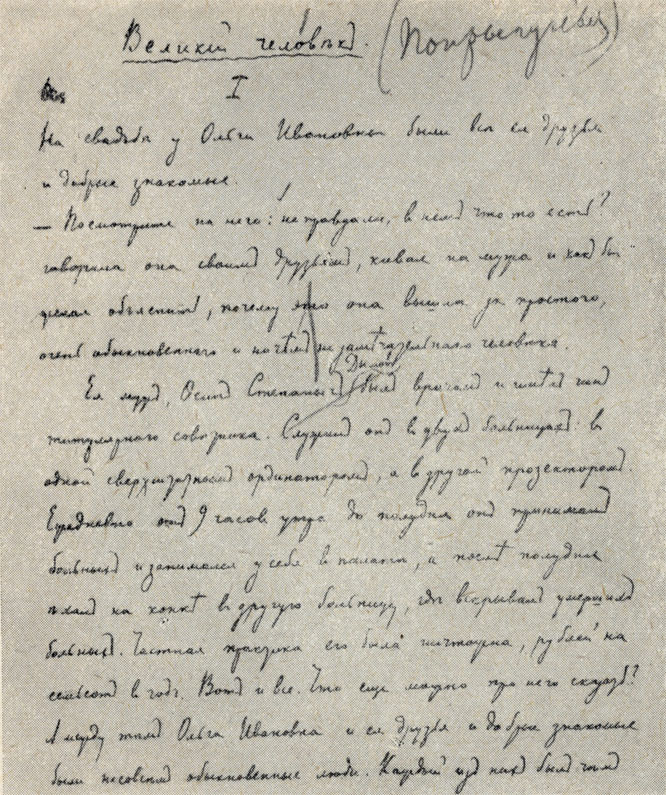
Page one of Chekhov's manuscript with the original title, Великий человек

Olga Ivanovna Dymova enjoys the company of extraordinary people, all painters, writers and musicians, who look to her bright and original. All members of the small artistic circle which she is a hostess of, they all tell her she herself is a promising artist and pianist, the reputation she tries to uphold by practising regularly and producing countless and, apparently, not very original 'etudes'.

Olga's recently married; her husband Osip Dymov is on the staff of two hospitals (a ward-surgeon in one, a dissecting demonstrator in another). He is a modest, kind and good-natured man who's totally out of place in this community of flashy celebrities who consider him ordinary and ignore him.

The brightest star of the bunch is the painter Ryabovsky, a handsome man who "had sold his last picture for five hundred roubles." Olga goes with him on a steamboat trip down the Volga river, and they become lovers. Dymov gradually becomes aware of what's happening and reacts with characteristic mildness... "That man crushes me with his magnanimity," Olga Ivanovna never tires to tell the people around her. He is almost sorry for his unfaithful wife, who soon indeed starts to suffer – from humiliation and jealousy, as Ryabovsky gets first bored, then exasperated with her overbearing company.

Finally, Ryabovsky gets himself another woman and Olga Ivanovna, dejected and outraged, returns home, dreaming of how she'd either commit suicide or write Ryabovsky a scathing, condemning letter... Something happens, though, to detract her attention: it turns out that Dymov is seriously ill: he'd caught diphtheria at the hospital by sucking up the mucus through a pipette from a sick man's throat. Several of his colleagues come to stay on duty by his bedside: they all speak of how gifted was this extraordinary, rare man, promising to become such a celebrity and is now dying due to his own carelessness.

Horrified with the realization, that, while hunting for artists and singers, she'd 'missed out on' what could have become a true celebrity and the greatest 'gem' in her collection through her silliness, Olga Ivanovna rushes to her husband's deathbed to explain how wrong she'd been and how everything could be different from now on... But Dymov is quiet now and his hands and forehead are very cold.

== Reception ==
"The Grasshopper" was well received by both the critics and the readership. Sergey Andreevsky, reviewing Novellas and Stories collection called it 'a gem of a novella'.

Lev Tolstoy called it 'brilliant'. "...First humorous, then more and more somber... and how deeply one feels in the end, that his death would not alter her at all", he has quoted as saying by his personal doctor, D.P. Makovitsky. Ivan Bunin included it into his personal list of his favourite Chekhov stories, with a note: "Fine story, horrible title."

Upon the story's publication Isaak Levitan felt so offended as to even entertain a thought of a duel. They made peace though three years later, due to the efforts of a mutual friend Tatiana Shchepkina-Kupernik, according to Mikhail Chekhov. Lensky did not speak to Chekhov for eight years, and Kuvshinnikova severed all ties with the author.
