= Anton Ivanovich Is Angry =

- Russian: Антон Иванович сердится
- Directed by: Aleksandr Ivanovsky
- Written by: Georgi Munblit; Yevgeni Petrov
- Starring: Nikolai Konovalov; Lyudmila Tselikovskaya; Pavel Kadochnikov; Aleksandr Orlov; Tamara Pavlotskaya
- Cinematography: Yevgeni Shapiro
- Music by: Dmitri Kabalevsky
- Release date: 1941
- Country: Soviet Union

Anton Ivanovich Is Angry (Russian: Антон Иванович сердится) is a 1941 Soviet musical comedy film directed by Aleksandr Ivanovsky.

The film follows musician Anton Ivanovich, a devoted performer of J.S. Bach's works, as he struggles to accept his conservatory-student daughter's passion for operettas and her romance with a young composer.

== Plot ==
The film opens with an organ concert at the prestigious St. Petersburg State Academic Capella. It is the spring of 1941, and Anton Ivanovich Voronov, a conservatory professor, organist, and ardent devotee of classical music, staunchly opposes modern musical forms. His disdain for contemporary music strains his relationships, especially when he learns that his daughter Sima is being courted by Mukhin, a composer of "frivolous" foxtrots for operettas. Conflict arises when Voronov discovers that Sima has secretly agreed to sing in Mukhin's operetta, a production warmly embraced by the operetta troupe except for the prima donna, Yadviga, whose vocal range cannot accommodate the lead role.

Determined to sabotage Sima's debut, Yadviga conspires with the conductor to raise the key of the lead aria, hoping Sima will fail. To everyone's astonishment, Sima hits the high note, earning resounding applause. Voronov, who initially forbade Sima from performing, learns of her involvement from his tenant, the inept composer Kerosinov, who inadvertently reveals her secret. Begrudgingly, Voronov attends the premiere and witnesses Sima's triumph, returning home in near-shock. That night, he dreams of his idol, Johann Sebastian Bach, who humorously confesses a secret longing to compose operettas instead of the chorales he is famed for. Bach even mocks Voronov's stubbornness, likening it to that of a mule.

The dream becomes a turning point for Voronov. He reconciles with Sima’s artistic aspirations and accepts her relationship with Mukhin. Embracing a newfound openness, he participates as an organist in the premiere of Mukhin's new oratorio, a celebratory work dedicated to the victory of labor and socialism, symbolizing the bridging of generational and artistic divides.

== Cast ==
- Nikolai Konovalov as Anton Ivanovich Voronov (as N. Konovalov)
- Lyudmila Tselikovskaya as Serafima "Sima" Antonovna Voronova
- Pavel Kadochnikov as Aleksei Petrovich Mukhin
- Aleksandr Orlov as Jakov Grigoryevich Kirbik (as A. Orlov)
- Tamara Pavlotskaya as Yadviga Valentinovna Kholodetskaya (as T. Pavlotskaya)
- Tamara Glebova as Natalya Mikhailovna Voronva (as T. Glebova)
- Tatyana Kondrakova as Dina Antonovna Voronova
- Sergey Martinson as Kerosinov (as Sergei Martinson)
- Anatoly Korolkevich as Stephan Stepanovich Skvoreshnikov
- Vladimir Gardin as Johann Sebastian Bach
- Vitaliy Kilchevskiy as Unidentified Player [Cast Name: Rollandov] (as V. Kilchevskii)
- Glikeriya Bogdanova-Chesnokova
