= Dimov (surname) =

Dimov (Bulgarian: Димов) is a Bulgarian masculine surname, its feminine counterpart is Dimova. It may refer to

- Daniel Dimov (born 1989), Bulgarian footballer
- Diana Dimova (born 1984), Bulgarian badminton player
- Dimitar Dimov (1909–1966), Bulgarian novelist and dramatist
- Dimitar Dimov (footballer) (born 1937), Bulgarian footballer
- Diyan Dimov (born 1985), Bulgarian footballer
- Evgenia Dimova (born 1982) Russian badminton player
- Ivan Dimov (1897–1965), Bulgarian actor
- Ivan Dimov (scientist), Bulgarian scientist
- Leonid Dimov (1926–1987), Romanian poet and translator
- Martin Dimov (footballer, born 1984) (born 1984), Bulgarian footballer
- Martin Dimov (footballer born 1986) (born 1986), Bulgarian footballer
- Milena Dimova (born 1994), Bulgarian volleyball player
- Oleg Dimov (born 1968), Russian politician
- Plamen Dimov (footballer) (born 1990), Bulgarian footballer
- Plamen Dimov (musician) (born 1955), Bulgarian musician
- Stanimir Dimov-Valkov (born 1978), Bulgarian football defender
- Theodora Dimova (born 1960), Bulgarian writer and playwright
- Valentin Dimov (born 1989), Bulgarian tennis player

== See also ==
- Dymov
