= Samson Samsonov =

Russian film director (1921–2002)

- Самсон Самсонов
- Born: Samson Iosifovich Edelstein; February 23, 1921; Novozybkov, Russian SFSR
- Died: August 31, 2002 (aged 81); Moscow, Russia
- Resting place: Troyekurovskoye Cemetery, Moscow
- Years active: 1948–1996
- Notable work: An Optimistic Tragedy (1963)
- Title: People's Artist of the USSR (1991)

Samson Iosifovich Samsonov (Russian: Самсо́н Ио́сифович Самсо́нов; 23 February 1921 – 31 August 2002) was a Soviet and Russian film director and screenwriter, he was granted the honorary title of People's Artist of the USSR in 1991.

Samson Samsonov graduated from Gerasimov Institute of Cinematography in 1951, where he studied under Sergei Gerasimov.

== Filmography ==
- Poprygunya (Попрыгунья) / The Grasshopper (1955)
- Za vitrinnoy univermaga (За витриной универмага) / Behind Show Windows (1956)
- Ognennye versty (Огненные вёрсты) / Miles of Fire (1957)
- Rovesnik veka (Ровесник века) /Contemporary of the Century (1960)
- Optimisticheskaya tragediya (Оптимистическая трагедия) / Optimistic Tragedy (1963)
- Tri sestry (Три сестры) / The Three Sisters (1964)
- Arena (Арена) / Arena (1967)
- Kazhdyy vecher v odinnadtsat (Каждый вечер в одиннадцать) /Each Evening at Eleven (1969)
- Mnogo shuma iz nichego (Много шума из ничего) / Much Ado About Nothing (1973)
- Chisto angliyskoe ubiystvo (Чисто английское убийство) /A Very English Murder (1974)
- Beshenoe zoloto (Бешеное золото) /The Golden Fleece (1976)
- Zhuravl v nebe (Журавль в небе) / Crane in the Sky (1977)
- Torgovka i poet (Торговка и поэт) / (1980)
- Vosmoye chudo sveta (Восьмое чудо света) / Eighth Wonder of the World (1981)
- Odinokim predostavlyaetsya obshchezhitiye (Одиноким предоставляется общежитие) / Offered for Singles (1983)
- Tantsploshchadka (Танцплощадка) / Dancefloor (1985)
- Neprikayannyy (Неприкаянный) / Stranded (1989)
- Myshelovka (Мышеловка) / The Mousetrap (1990)
- Kazino (Казино) / Casino (1992)
- Milyy drug davno zabytykh let... (Милый друг давно забытых лет...) / Sweet Friend of Years Forgotten Long Ago... (1996)
