= Osip Dymov =

Fictional character in "The Grasshopper" by Anton Chekov

Osip Dymov (Russian: Осип Дымов) is the central fictional character in the classic Russian story "The Grasshopper" (Poprygunya; 1892) by Anton Chekhov. For generations this character has served to inspire medical professionals as to the standards of dedication expected from them.

== About the character ==
Dymov is an unassuming doctor married to Olga Ivanovna, a beautiful and wealthy socialite, and amateur artist, who allows her moral values, as well as sense of beauty, to become distorted by her restless search for great men. They soon grow apart, due to her preference for the "fast life", on the one hand, and his total dedication to his profession, on the other. He suspects that she is having an affair, but displays an admirable magnanimity towards her.

She soon tires of her companions when she learns of their vacuous nature (and her lover's infidelity) and realises how great her husband was, which she took for granted. She tries desperately to return to him but by that time it is too late – in order to save a diphtheria patient, Dymov had swallowed membrane from his patient's throat and died from the infection.
