= Tatiana Shchepkina-Kupernik =

Russian and Soviet writer, dramatist, poet and translator

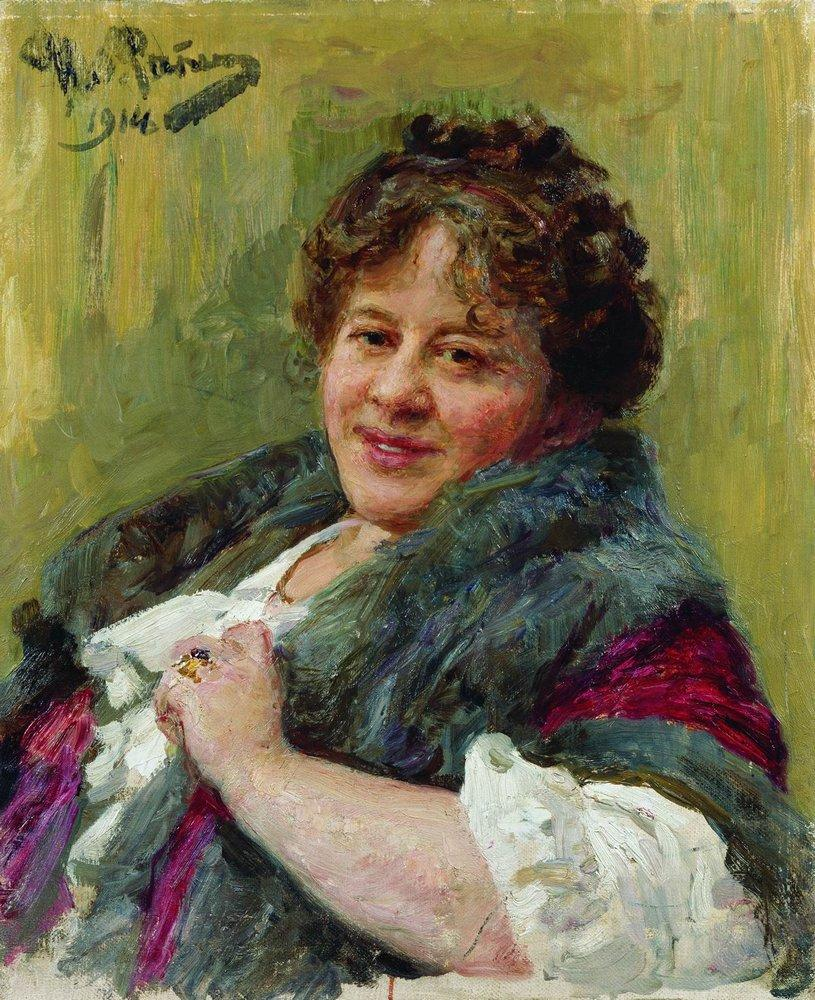
- Portrait of T.L. Shchepkina-Kupernik by Ilya Repin, Oil on canvas, 1914
- Born: January 24 [O.S. January 12] 1874; Moscow, Russian Empire
- Died: July 27, 1952 (aged 78); Moscow, USSR
- Occupations: Writer, dramatist, poes and translator

"Akh, ya vlyublon v odni glaza… (Ah, I'm in love with some eyes…)", music by Aleksandr Vilensky, poem by Tatiana Shchepkina-Kupernik, performed by Michael Vavitch, 1909

Tatiana Lvovna Shchepkina-Kupernik (Russian: Татья́на Льво́вна Ще́пкина-Купе́рник, January 24 [O.S. January 12] 1874, in Moscow, Russian Empire – July 27, 1952, in Moscow, USSR) was a Russian and Soviet writer, dramatist, poet and translator.

== Biography ==
Born in the family of Kiev advocate Lev Kupernik, Tatiana Shchepkina-Kupernik was a granddaughter of famous Russian actor Mikhail Shchepkin and Elena Dmitrievna who was a Turkish captive during the Siege of Anapa. She graduated from the Kiev Gymnasium. In her twelfth year Shchepkina wrote a poem in honour of her grandfather.

In 1892 the Moscow Maly Theater staged her play called Summer Picture. In the 1892–1893 theatrical season Shchepkina played in the Korsh Theater.

Shchepkina worked with several Russian periodicals - Artist, Russian Vedomosti, Russian Idea, Northern Courier, New Time, using different literary styles.

In 1895-1915 she wrote a number of prose and poetry collections. Her poem At Homeland - From the fallen strongholds of Port-Arthur... («На родине» - «От павших твердынь Порт-Артура...») written at 1905 quickly became known nationwide.

She produced several well-known Russian translations of Edmond Rostand and Maurice Maeterlinck plays. Shchepkina also translated the works of Lope De Vega, William Shakespeare, John Fletcher, Molière, Carlo Goldoni, Richard Brinsley Sheridan and Lewis Carroll's Alice's Adventures in Wonderland into Russian. In total she translated about 60 plays into Russian, mostly during the period after the Russian Revolution.

She composed poetic plays of her own, mostly in one act (Revenge of Amur, Eternity in a Moment, Lady with Violets, Happy Women, etc.).

In 1940 she was awarded an Honoured Master of Arts of RSFSR.

== English translations ==
- A Vision of the War, (Poem), and Deborah, (Story), from The Soul of Russia, Macmillan and Co, London, 1916. from Archive.org
