= Over Eternal Peace =

1894 painting by Isaac Levitan

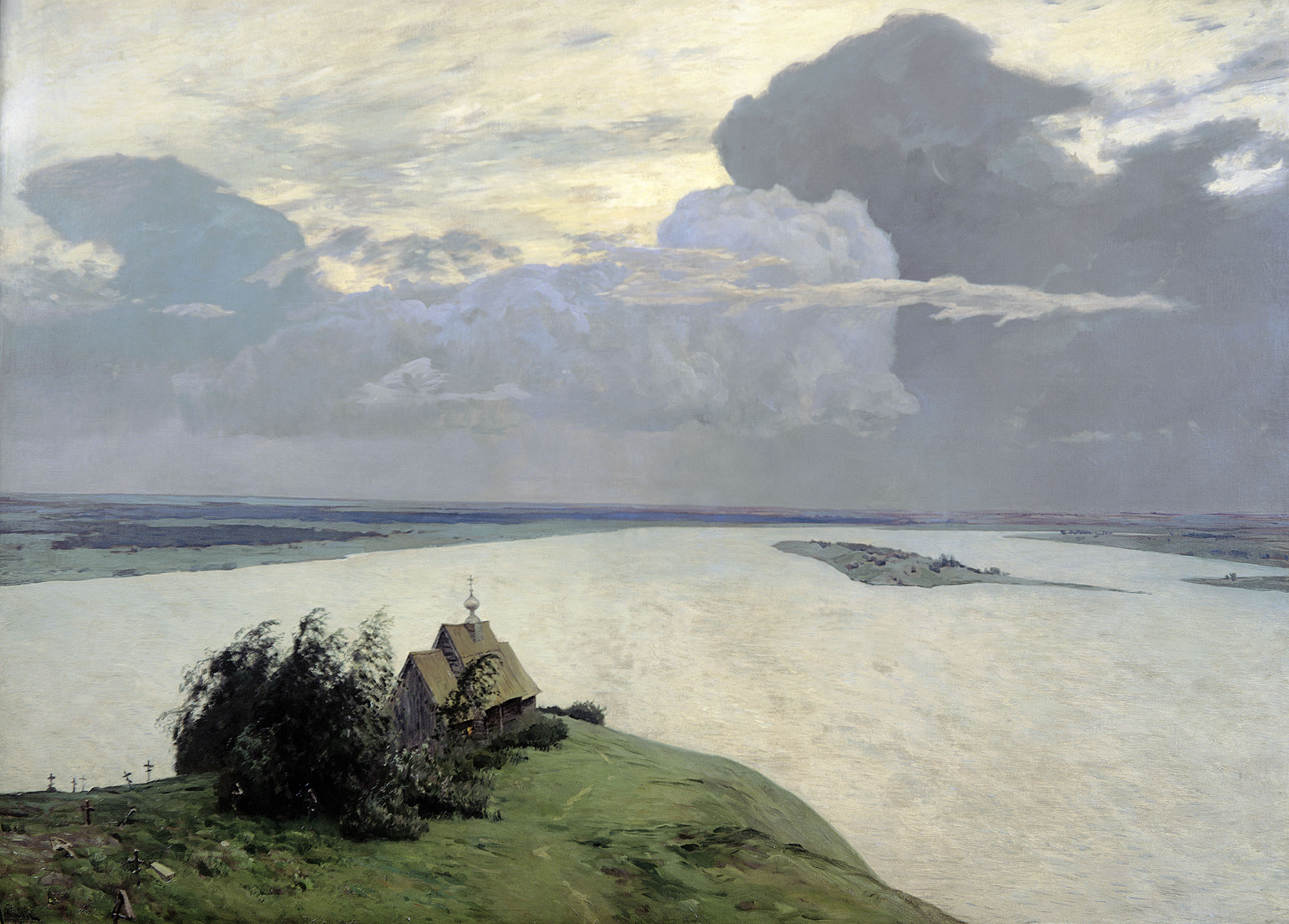
- Artist: Isaac Levitan
- Year: 1894
- Medium: Oil on canvas
- Dimensions: 150 cm × 206 cm (59 in × 81 in)
- Location: State Tretyakov Gallery, Moscow

Over Eternal Peace is a landscape painting by Russian artist Isaac Levitan (1860–1900), completed in 1894. It belongs to the State Tretyakov Gallery (Inventory No. 1486). The size of the painting is 150 × 206 cm (152 × 207.5 cm, according to other sources).

The painting's creation began in the summer of 1893, while Levitan was in Tver governorate, specifically in the area of lakes Ostrovno and Udomlya. In 1894, the canvas Over Eternal Peace was exhibited at the 22nd exhibition of the Society for Travelling Art Exhibitions ('Peredvizhniki') in Saint Petersburg. Prior to the exhibition's opening, Pavel Tretyakov had already purchased the painting from the author.

Over Eternal Peace is one of the three largest pieces created by the artist, alongside By the Pool (1892) and Lake (1899–1900). Over Eternal Peace, along with By The Pool and Vladimirka (1892), from the first half of the 1890s, are occasionally grouped together as the 'gloomy' or "dramatic" trilogy by Levitan.

According to the writer and publicist Vasily Mikheev, the canvas Over Eternal Peace is "a true landscape painting," this work by Levitan – "a symphony, strange at first sight, but subtly embracing the soul once you trust its impression." Art historian Aleksei Fedorov-Davydov wrote that Over Eternal Peace explores "the relationship between human existence and the eternal life of nature," and "from this juxtaposition of nature and the traces of human existence in it, a landscape filled with sublime sorrow and tragic heroics is formed." According to art historian Vitaly Manin, the painting is "one of the artist's most expressive works, dynamic and 'associative'."

== History ==
=== Creation of the painting ===
Isaac Levitan began working on the painting Over Eternal Peace in the summer of 1893 while living in Tver governorate. First, he was invited to visit the Garino estate on the Msta River by artist Lavrentiy Donskoy. Then, Levitan arrived at Troitsa station (now Udomlya), that was a part of Moscow-Vindavo-Rybinsk Railway at the time, by train with his companion, the artist Sofia Kuvshinnikova. Upon arrival, Filipp Petrov, a peasant from the village of Doronino, recommended that they stay at the Ushakovs' estate Ostrovno, as they welcomed holidaymakers. Levitan followed Petrov's advice and stayed at Ostrovno. The estate was situated on the shore of Lake Ostrovno, which derives its name from the three islands located within it.

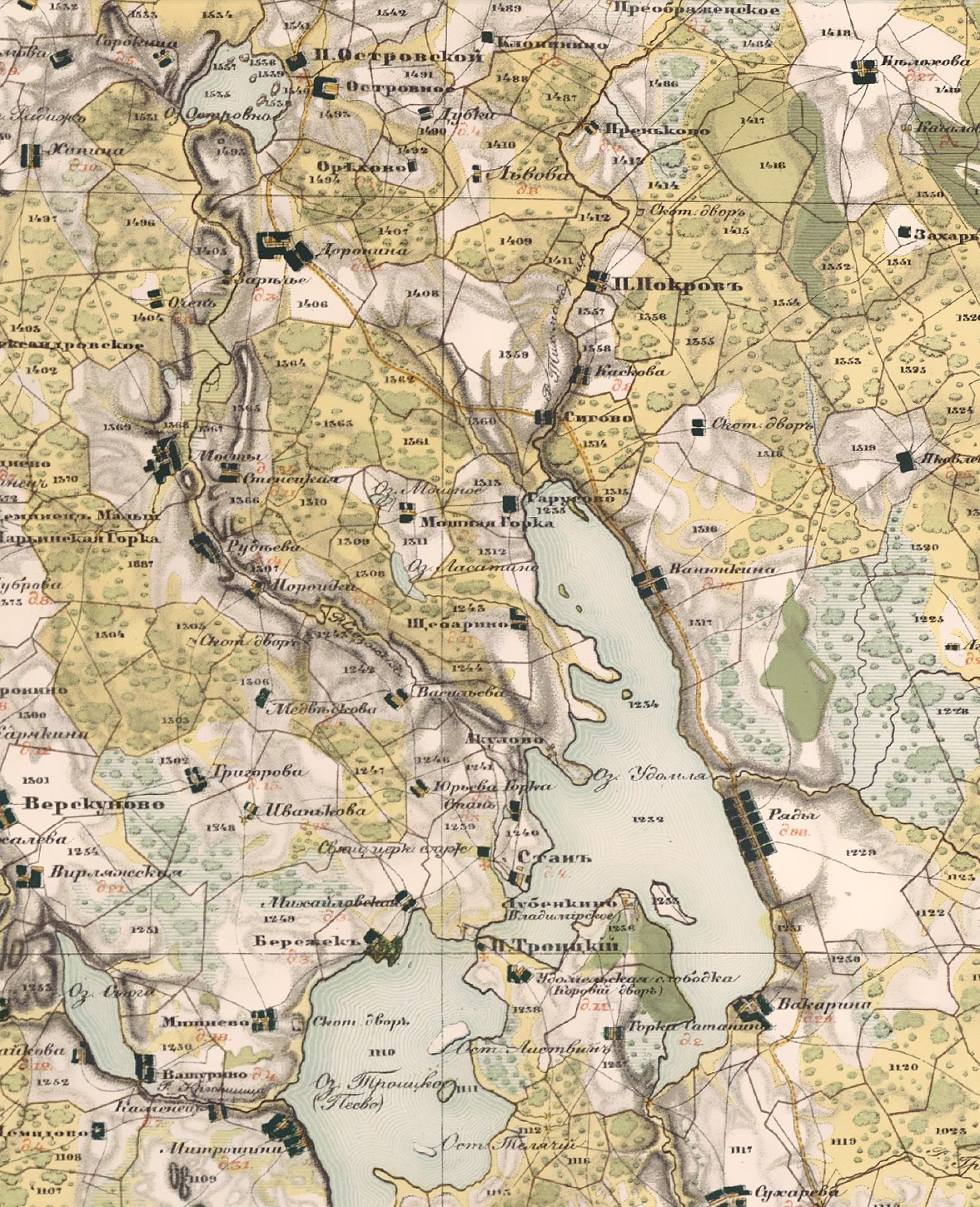
Lakes Udomlya and Ostrovno on the topographic map of 1853

The estate was owned by Ekaterina Nikolayevna Ushakova (née Seslavina, 1821–1910) and her children Varvara Vladimirovna (1849 – around 1919), Sofia Vladimirovna (1851 – around 1919) and Nikolai Vladimirovich (1859–1917). The owners provided a warm welcome to Levitan and Kuvshinnikova, striving to create the best possible conditions for their creative work. In his memoirs, artist Vitold Byalynitsky-Birulya, who visited Ostrovno in the 1900s, describes the house where Levitan lived in 1893: "The old Ushakov house in the Empire style, with greenish-blue glass in the windows and a wide staircase, descending several flights and balcony platforms into the garden, was full of lilacs. It filled the greater part of the estate, and was almost the same age as the old house." Levitan and Kuvshinnikova rented two rooms on the second floor. Byalynitsky-Birulya wrote: "The rooms in the house were very bright, white, without wallpaper, the windows of one room faced west, from there Levitan could watch the sunset, and the other room had a balcony and a wonderful view of the lake. In this room there was an antique harpsichord. From the balcony a staircase led to a fabulously beautiful lilac garden."

During their time at Lake Udomlya, located six kilometers from Ostrovno, Levitan and Kuvshinnikova resided at the Garusovo estate. The estate was owned by the Arakcheyevs, distant relatives of Count Aleksey Arakcheyev, a prominent statesman and military figure of the early 19th century. At that time, Mikhail Mikhailovich Arakcheyev (around 1850 – around 1917), who enjoyed fishing, permanently resided in the estate. The owners provided their guests with the attic on the second floor for recreational purposes. Levitan's painting At the Lake (1893), now in the Radishchev Art Museum, depicts the shore of Lake Udomlya near Garusov. Kuvshinnikova said that when Levitan was working on Over Eternal Peace, "the terrain and, in general, the whole motif were taken from nature during one of our rides on horseback." Sophia Petrovna remembered that Levitan painted the artwork "with great passion." He requested her "to play Beethoven, particularly the symphony héroïque with its Marche funèbre."

During the creation of the canvas, Levitan produced graphic sketches and several studies. He also made a large sketch of the future painting Over Eternal Peace (canvas, oil, 95 × 197 cm, 1893, now in the State Tretyakov Gallery). In late 1893, the artist continued working on the canvas in Moscow, and it was completed in early 1894. Upon finishing the work, Levitan signed it in the lower left corner: «I Levitan 94» (Russian «И Левитанъ 94»).

=== 22nd traveling exhibition and selling the painting ===
The canvas Over Eternal Peace was exhibited at the 22nd exhibition of the Society for Travelling Art Exhibitions ('Peredvizhniki') in Saint Petersburg on 6 March 1894 (according to other sources, 8 March), along with other works by Levitan, including the paintings At the Lake (At the Lake in Tver Region), Evening Shadows, Venice. Etude, and several pastels. In April of the same year, the exhibition moved to Moscow. The exhibition's Saint Petersburg segment took place in the Society for the Encouragement of Arts building. Critics highlighted several landscape paintings, including Ivan Shishkin's Forest Cemetery, Yefim Volkov's Deserted Coast, Nikolay Dubovskoy's The Land, Valentin Serov's In the Crimea, Nikolay Dosekin's Surf, and others.

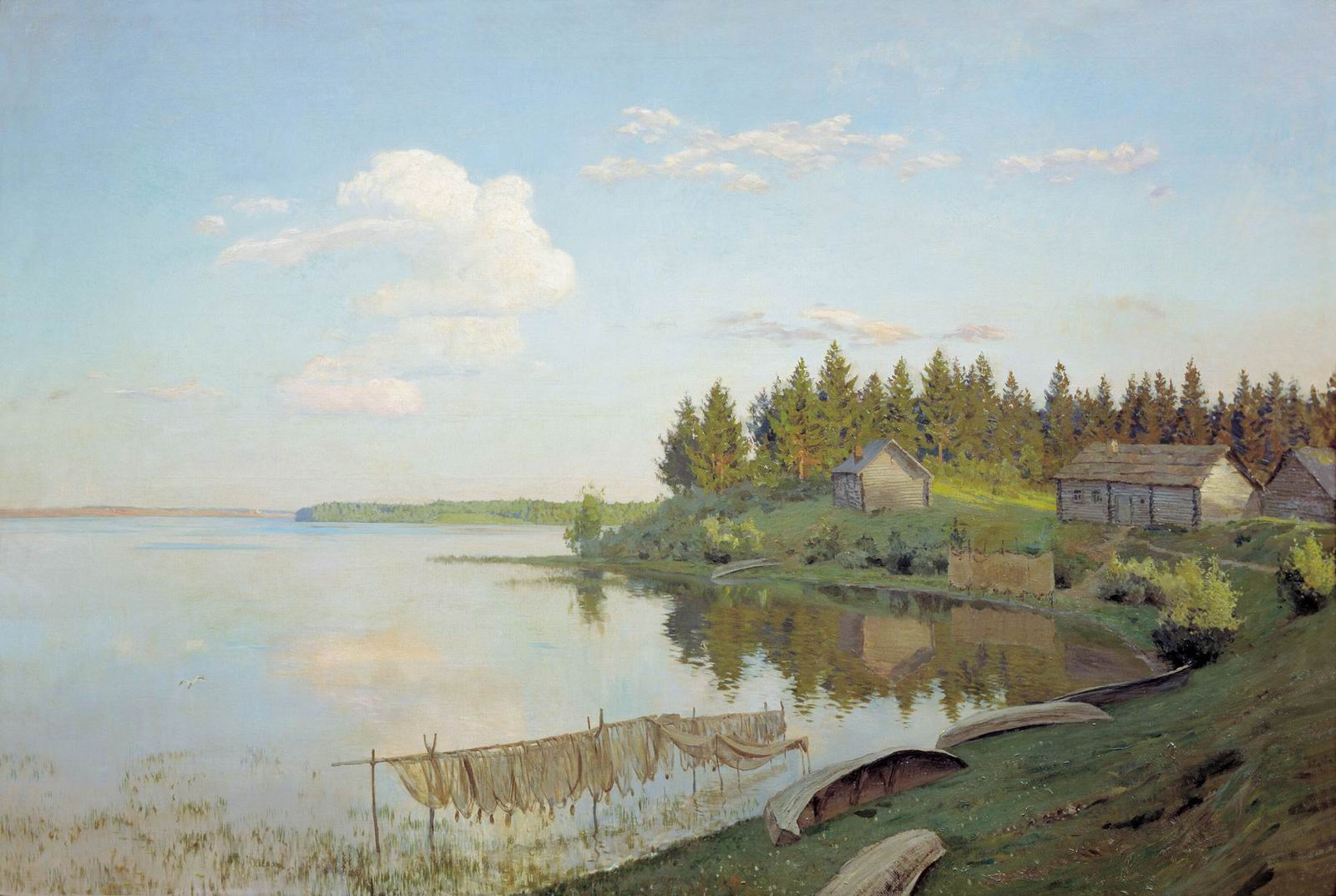
At The Lake (canvas, oil, 109 × 163 cm, 1893, Radishchev Art Museum)

According to reports, the painting Over Eternal Peace was "significantly mispresented" during the exposition in Saint Petersburg. This was due to the organizers hanging it in a disadvantageous place for perception. Prior to the opening of the 22nd travelling exhibition in Moscow, which was to be held at the Moscow School of Painting, Sculpture and Architecture, Levitan wrote to the artist Ilya Ostroukhov requesting that the painting Over Eternal Peace be displayed in an area with optimal lighting conditions for the canvas. In a letter dated March 12, 1894, Levitan wrote: "Dear Ilya Semyonovich! Tomorrow I'm leaving Moscow and will not be at the arrangement of the Moscow Itinerant, so I ask you, if you are the organizer – or even if you are not, then pass on my request to the organizers. To put my big painting either in the natural class in the place of my "At the pool," or in the place of last year's painting "Wooded shore" in the figure class." To ensure that his enquiry reached the organizers of the exposition, Levitan sent a letter on 9 April 1894, from Nice to the artist Apollinary Vasnetsov, repeating his request.

Prior to the opening of the travelling exhibition, Pavel Tretyakov purchased the painting Over Eternal Peace from the author. In a letter dated 18 May 1894, Levitan wrote: "I am so unspeakably happy with the knowledge that my last work will again get to you, that since yesterday I have been in some kind of ecstasy. And it is actually surprising, because you have enough of my things, but the fact that this last one has come to you touches me so much because I am all in it, with all my psyche, with all my content, and it would hurt me to tears if it had passed your colossal collection."

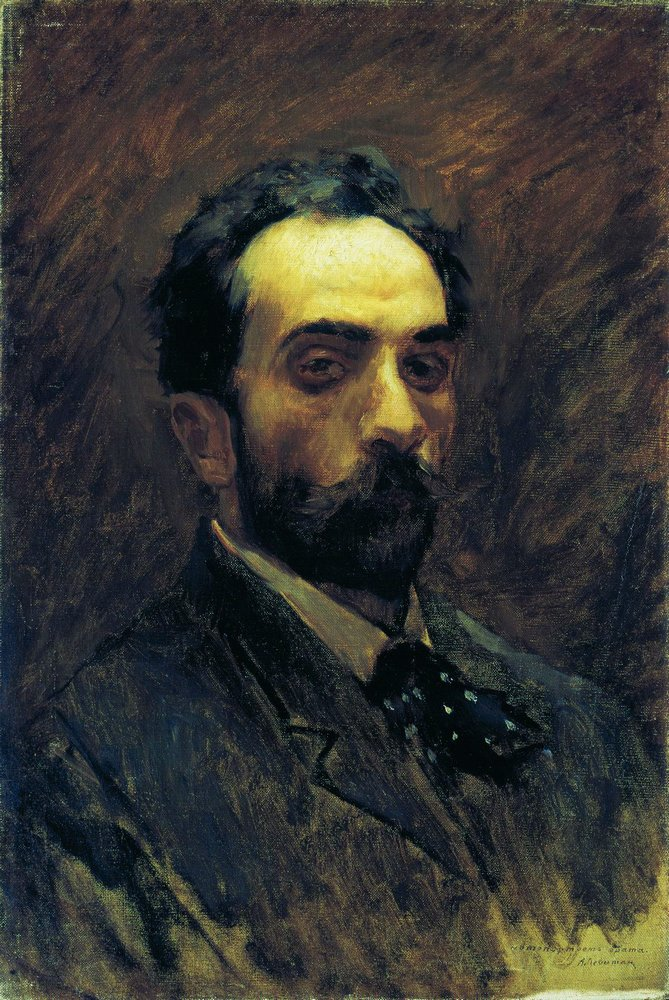
Self-Portrait by Isaac Levitan (1890s, State Tretyakov Gallery)

The painting Over Eternal Peace received a lot of attention from viewers and reviewers, but opinions on it were divided. Many critics characterised the painting as "causing bewilderment in the audience." Not having understood the philosophical idea that Levitan tried to put into his work, some critics found its title too pretentious and aimed at "raising the value" of the painting. For instance, the author of an article in 'Moskovskiy Listok' (No. 130, 11 May 1894) about the travelling exhibition wrote that "it would be better to title the painting more modestly." The author also criticized the painting for "an abyss of pretensions and lack of rights, broad ideas and poor execution." Some reviewers perceived Levitan's desire to convey his deep thoughts and experiences as an attempt to follow the fashionable "pessimistic tradition." They also felt that the title of the painting contradicted the dynamics of its depiction, which was "far from eternal peace." In particular, the author of an article in the journal "Nablyudatel" (No. 9 for 1894), wrote, calling the water space a river: "The river runs, bubbling, the clouds are painted a little too heavily on the horizon, the earth blooms, in short – life is everywhere; but the artist is possessed by pessimism, so he is in a hurry to make the viewer sad and remind him of the hour of death, if [at least] with the caption, the title of the painting"

In a review article about the Peredvizhniki exhibition published in the newspaper "Nedelya" (No. 14, 3 April 1894), the author acknowledges that the idea of the painting Over Eternal Peace is "so new and interesting that it deserves mentioning" and analysis, and concluded that "you cannot see perfection in an attempt to paint a vast space, but it shows that the artist is looking for a new path and, judging by his other, smaller works, probably will find this path." In the note "At the exhibition of the Peredvizhniki," published in the magazine "Vsemirnaya Illyustratsiya" (vol. 51, No. 1314 in 1894), the critic Vladimir Chuiko, considering the painting unsuccessful in artistic terms, at the same time recognised that "despite, however, all these technical shortcomings, the painting nevertheless has a mood: Mr Levitan has managed to express the impression of some kind of dead peace, reminiscent of the idea of death, it is only a pity that this idea is expressed so strangely."

Several authors of publications about the travelling exhibition have noted the pictorial weakness of the painting Over Eternal Peace. For example, a correspondent of the newspaper "Novosti Dnya" (No. 3903, 28 April 1894), who signed his initials M.U., noted that "the land seems as if cut out and pasted on the water, the cloud does not have its reflection in the river." Other critics believed that "the clouds are too inky painted," that "the distant plan is too heavily painted with indigo," that the water is painted with "completely white paint," etc. According to the art historian Alexei Fedorov-Davydov, "the new character of the painting with its decorative features and the desire to solve monumental tasks in this way was taken for a strange oddity, for incompleteness, for "indefinite ointment," posing as a special "manner," for the laying of new paths."

In periodicals of that time, there were also openly unfriendly publications. The authors of these publications attempted to blatantly insult the artist and his work. Thus, in "Peterbugskiy Listok" (No. 67, 10 March 1894) under the signature "Realist" was published a quatrain, addressed to Levitan, of the following content: "You smeared a lot ... You have not glorified yourself. / Pastels, canvases – worthy of a smile. / "Over Eternal Peace" accidentally you / Put rocks in the sky, my friend, by mistake." Another example of this is a feuilleton by journalist Vlas Doroshevich published in the "Peterburgskaya Gazeta" (No. 77, 20 March 1894), "Mobile Geniuses. Misunderstanding in Act I," which took the form of a dialogue between Isaac Levitan and the critic Vladimir Stasov. As a result of their "discussion" Levitan's painting "is recognised as suitable only for making Stasov's sirwal out of its canvas."

Nevertheless, there were also positive reviews of the painting Over Eternal Peace. In particular, in a review article about the 22nd travelling exhibition, published in the newspaper "Russkie Vedomosti" (No. 110, 23 April 1894), art critic Vladimir Sizov called Levitan's painting "well thought out and strongly felt," distinguished by "undoubted artistic merits." In an article published in 1894 in the magazine "The Artist," writer and publicist Vasily Mikheev "sensitively grasped the deep psychology of the canvas and called it a genuine landscape-painting, remarkable for its content and 'mood'."

=== Subsequent events ===
Over Eternal Peace was exhibited at an 1898 exhibition of Russian and Finnish artists as part of the Munich Secession. The exhibition, which showcased around 120 paintings, was held in Munich from 1 May to 1 June and later visited Berlin, Cologne and Düsseldorf. Levitan's paintings The Last Snow, Meadow on the Edge of the Forest and In the North were also featured in the exhibition.

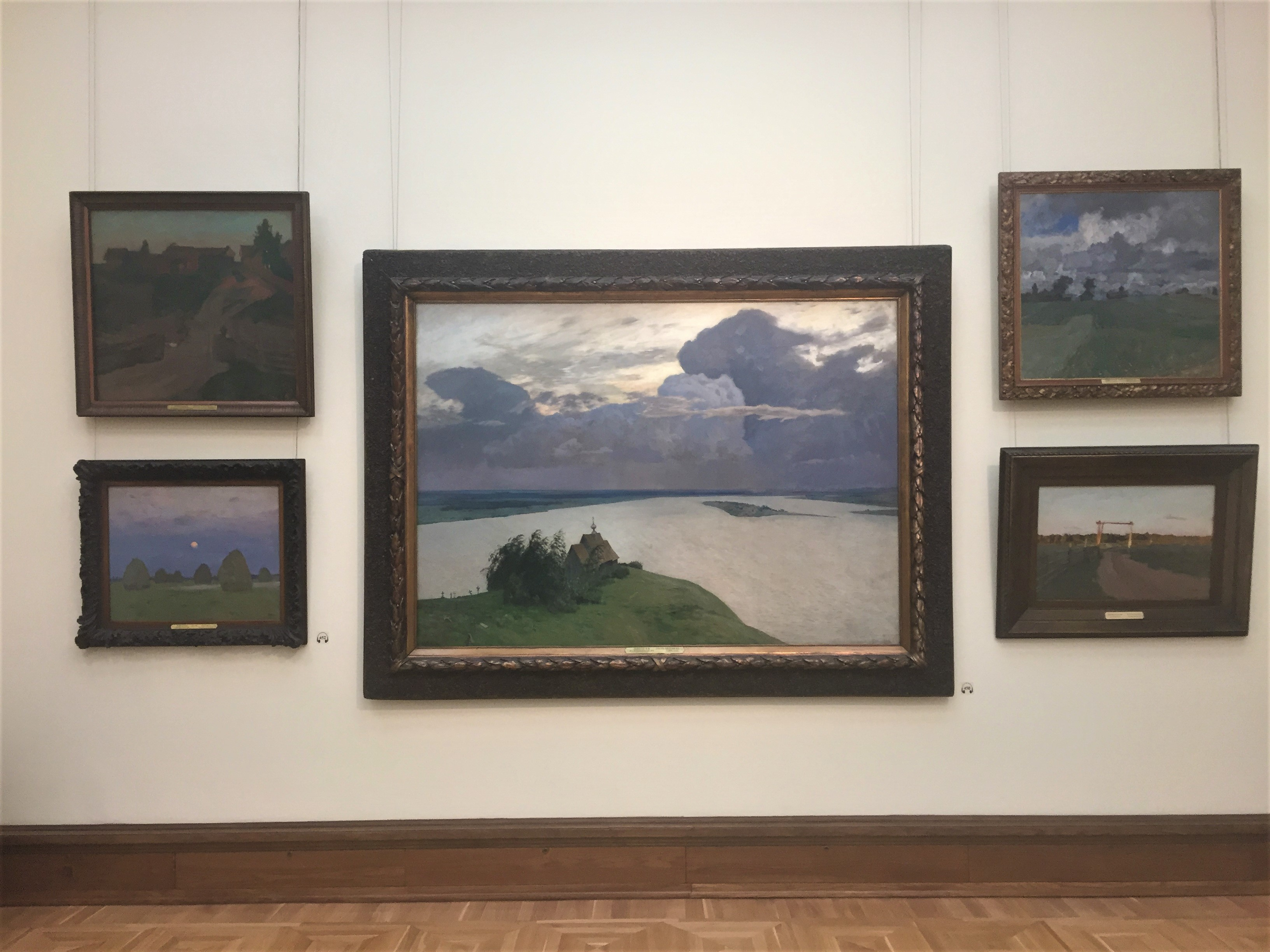
The painting Over Eternal Peace in the Levitan Hall of the State Tretyakov Gallery

During the summer of 1941, following the start of the Great Patriotic War, numerous exhibits from the State Tretyakov Gallery's collection were evacuated to Novosibirsk. They were stored in the unfinished building of the Novosibirsk Opera and Ballet Theatre. One of the evacuated works of art was Levitan's painting Over Eternal Peace. The paintings were eventually returned to the Tretyakov Gallery in November 1944.

The painting Over Eternal Peace was exhibited at several exhibitions, including Levitan's personal exhibitions in 1938 at the State Tretyakov Gallery in Moscow and in 1939 at the State Russian Museum in Leningrad. It was also displayed at the jubilee exhibition commemorating the 100th anniversary of the artist's birth, held in 1960–1961 in Moscow, Leningrad, and Kyiv. The canvas was exhibited in 1971–1972 at "Peredvizhniki in the State Tretyakov Gallery" (Moscow) and "Landscape Painting of the Peredvizhniki" (Kyiv, Leningrad, Minsk, Moscow) to commemorate the centenary of the Society for Travelling Art Exhibitions. The painting was exhibited at the New Tretyakov Gallery on Krymsky Val for the 150th anniversary exhibition of Levitan's birth from October 2010 to March 2011. It was also displayed at the Vatican Museums from November 2018 to February 2019 as part of the exhibition "Pilgrimage of Russian Art. From Dionisius to Malevich."

The painting Over Eternal Peace is currently on display in the Levitan Hall (Room No. 37) of the main building of the Tretyakov Gallery in Lavrushinsky Lane.

== Description ==
The painting portrays "a gigantic turning of the lake's water space," the vast expanse of which resembles a wide-spreading river. Above the lake, there is a "majestic expanse of sky with swirling clouds colliding with each other." The image of the sky can be divided into two parts: darker, cloudy at the bottom and lighter, cloudy at the top. In the near background, there is a cape with an old church on its elevated shore. To the left of the church lies a rural cemetery with old, long-forgotten graves. The cemetery creates a sombre atmosphere with ruined graves almost flattened to the ground, gnarled crosses, and overgrown paths. The artist has paid particular attention to the composition of the cemetery church on the hill. The old wooden church standing by the cliff is "perfectly integrated into the landscape," and the trees growing near it are painted with a soft brush. According to the art historian Alexei Fedorov-Davydov, "a small cape with a church and a cemetery, booed by the wind of the elements, seems like the prow of some kind of ship moving into the unknown distance," and the light in the church window is perceived as "a witness to human life, its inexhaustibility and quiet resignation." Fedorov-Davydov noted that in the painting we see "a clear construction of the image from the main parts and different detailing of each of them"; all this corresponds to the compositional solution of the canvas, in which "asymmetry is balanced by the antidirectional movement of each of these parts that make up the painting – the cape, the islet, the water, the clouds, etc."

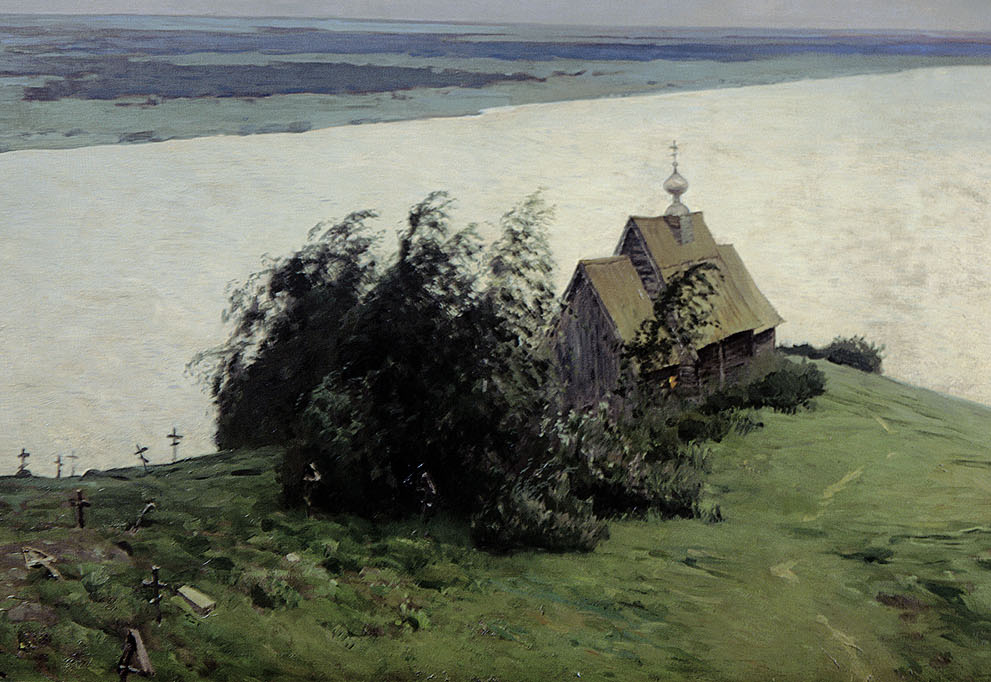
Church and cemetery (fragment of the painting)

The composition found by the artist required a pictorial solution that would help "to feel more acutely the vastness and power of the space that opens up before the observer." This seems to explain the differences in the way Levitan painted the near and far plans: the latter are "given with such an extreme generalisation of form and colour that we have not seen in his previous works." In addition, the painting techniques used are diverse. The dark and stormy sky with low-hanging clouds is emphasised by a layer of paint applied over the horizon line. The brushstrokes become more dynamic for the higher parts of the sky, and the texture of the painting changes. The movement of the disorderly pile of clouds is conveyed by "a combination of subtle shades of greyish purple, in some places leaden or greyish-brown tones." The painting's lower planes exhibit a range of painting techniques. Levitan used different methods to paint the water, the low bank in the distance, and the grassy hill in the foreground. To prevent the water from appearing monochromatic, he employed grey and white tones to depict the ripples, varied the direction of the strokes, and then scratched (apparently with a comb) sections of the water surface over an undried layer of paint. According to art historian Faina Maltseva, "the difference in painting techniques does not, however, violate the ideological pathos of the idea or the persuasiveness of its interpretation that includes real nature impressions taken as a basis for the plot of the painting."

There are different versions as to which place is depicted on the canvas and which church served as the prototype for the one painted by the artist. In her often quoted memoirs that "have become a chrestomathy," Sophia Kuvshinnikova claims that the painting Over Eternal Peace was painted near Lake Udomlya, "only the church in nature was different, ugly, and Levitan replaced it with a cosy church from Plyos." According to experts on Levitan's work, it is believed that he used his 1888 sketch "Wooden Church in Plyos at the last rays of the sun" as a reference when painting the church. The sketch depicted the Peter and Paul Church, which was situated on a hill that would later be named "Mount Levitan." In 1903, the Peter and Paul Church was destroyed by fire. In 1982, the Resurrection Church from the village of Bilyukovo was relocated to the same spot. It was informally named "Over Eternal Peace."

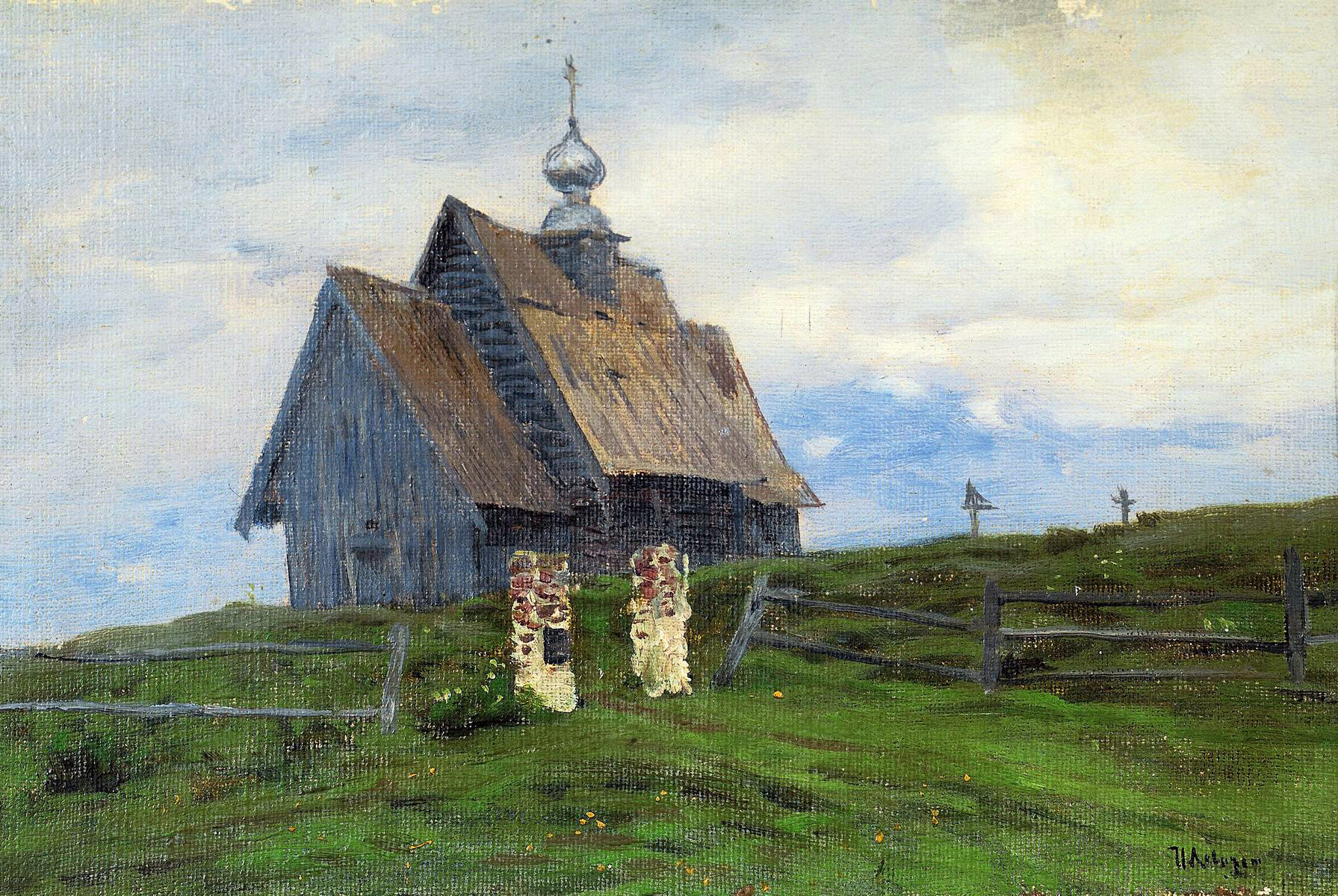
Wooden church in Plyos in the last rays of the sun (sketch, 1888, private collection)

The memoirs of the artist Vitold Byalynitsky-Birulya give a different version. According to him, Levitan often came with his paints and easel to the shore of Lake Ostrovno, "near which, on a hill, stood an old wooden church, half buried in the ground." Byalynitsky-Birulya gave the following details: "Near the church, closer to the lake, there was a forgotten, completely overgrown cemetery. The wooden crosses were shrivelled and covered with green moss." The artist also noted that "Levitan liked to visit the neighbouring Lake Udomlya, he liked to go by boat to the oval island, from where the whole length of Lake Udomlya was visible." According to Byalynitsky-Birulya, "the cape of the island was taken as the first plan of the painting, but it was supplemented by the motif of a church and a cemetery observed on Lake Ostrovno." According to one account, the "oval island," the cape of which is depicted in the painting could be Arzhanik Island, located in the northern part of Lake Udomlya, not far from Garusov. According to other information, it could be Dvinovo Island, located in the southern part of Udomlya Lake. Nowadays this island is covered with forest, but at the end of the 19th century it was "completely treeless."

In the 1983 book "Artists of the Udomlya Region," the art historian Leah Katz published an excerpt from the notes of Alexei Moravov (son of the artist Alexander Moravov), which gives another version. According to him, at the time when Levitan was working in the Udomlya Lake area, the only wooden church on the lake shore was "between the villages of Akulovo and Troitsa, towards Lubenkino," and in the early 1900s it was "dismantled and moved to the other side of the lake, to the village of Ryad," where it burned down some time later. At the same time, Moravov confirmed that there was no church on the island of Udomlya.

Local historian Dmitry Podushkov noted that "we can say with a high degree of certainty that the composition of the painting Over Eternal Peace was made by Levitan in the village of Ostrovno," where the Ushakov estate served as an upper vantage point. At the same time, according to Podushkov, "the vast expanse of water, the general contours of the lake shore, the viewer's vantage point again, the distant horizon line, some elements of the composition can be seen on Lake Udomlya." In this case, according to Podushkov, the high point of observation could be Krasilnikova Hill, a high hill at the northern end of Lake Udomlya, which offers a panoramic view of the lake in a south-easterly direction.

Art historian Alexei Fedorov-Davydov wrote that the painting Over Eternal Peace is "a transfer of a motif seen on one lake to the image of another, similar one." At the same time, in his opinion, the natural view of Lake Udomlya is "the frame of the work, its compositional basis." Fedorov-Davydov agreed with Byalynitsky-Birulya that the painting "was not given to Levitan thanks to this or that sketch," "it was not created from a study and, of course, it is not an enlarged study." According to Fedorov-Davydov, "in the end the painting seems to be a much more composed landscape than it really is," and the degree of "composition" in Levitan's paintings is measured by "the degree of synthesis of the real view into a pictorial landscape image."

== Sketches and Studies ==
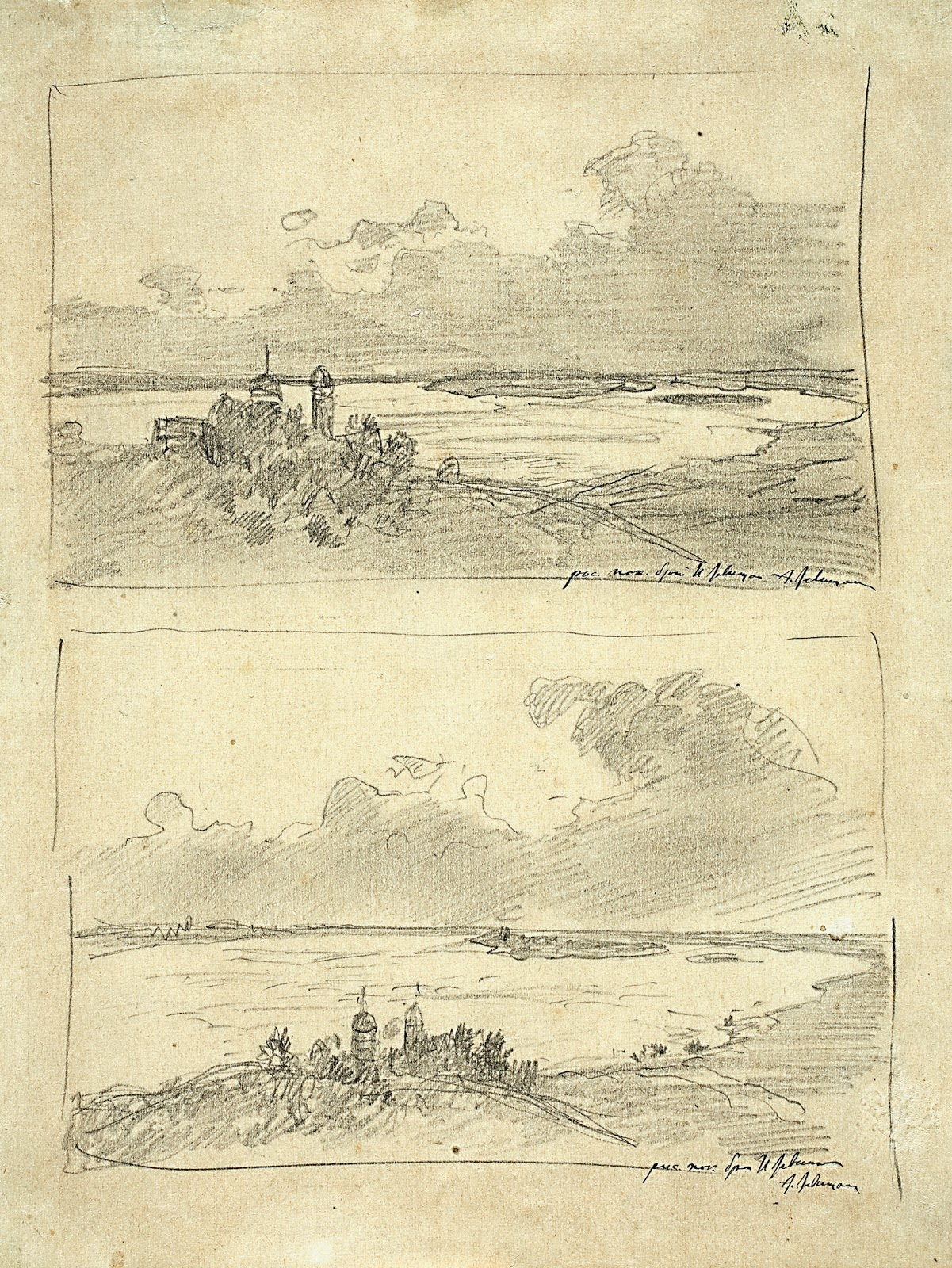
Before the Thunderstorm (initial sketches-variants of the painting Over Eternal Peace, 1893, State Tretyakov Gallery)

The State Tretyakov Gallery holds two original graphic sketches-variants for the painting Over Eternal Peace. Dating from 1893 and bearing the common title Before the Storm, the drawings are executed in graphite pencil on a single sheet of paper (total format 18 × 16 cm, inv. no. 5689). The upper drawing is considered to be the first and the lower the second. According to the art historian Faina Maltseva, these "hasty sketches" are "not even sketches yet, but only the first born thought, which contains the grain of the future painting." Levitan shows the anxiety in nature associated with the approaching storm. The lower sketch depicts the lake from a higher viewpoint than the upper one, creating a grander impression of the water spaces. The artist's haste is evident in the uneven and jagged strokes, as well as in the outline of the depicted objects. According to Elena Byalynitsky-Birulya (widow of the artist Vitold Byalynitsky-Birulya), these drawings portray the landscape of Lake Ostrovno with the Trinity Church on the shore.

In 1893, while working on the painting Over Eternal Peace, Levitan created several sketches. One of these sketches, titled Cloudy Sky (paper on cardboard, oil, 17.8 × 26.2 cm), is held in the collection of the State Russian Museum (inv. Zh-1218), having entered it in 1927. Prior to this, it was part of K.D. Ermakov's collection. Another sketch, titled Sky, is held in a private collection in Moscow (as of 1966, it was part of R.K. Viktorova's collection). These sketches depict a stormy sky and were created by the artist at different times. One of them, titled Cloudy Sky, shows dark purple clouds in a blue sky, while the other, titled Sky, shows grey clouds with yellow and pink colours used to paint the sky. Another sketch, titled Lake, is also held in a private collection in Moscow (as of 1966, in the collection of L.F. Ilyichev).

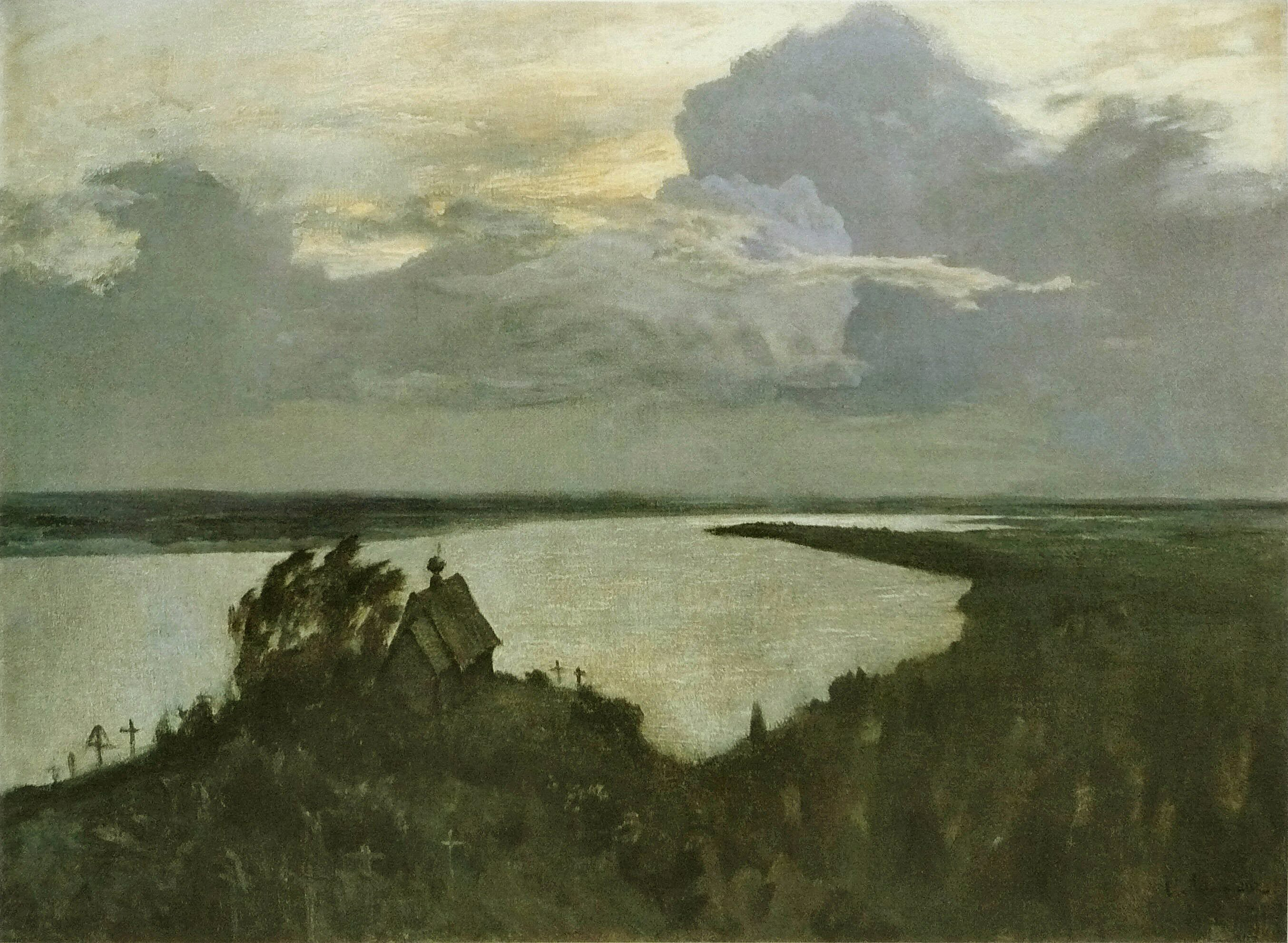
Over Eternal Peace (large sketch, 1893, State Tretyakov Gallery)

During the summer of 1893, Levitan produced a pastel titled Forgotten (current location unknown). The artwork portrays "an abandoned cemetery on a slope with drooping crosses." Alexei Fedorov-Davydov stated that "the motif was definitely used in the painting Over Eternal Peace, including the grave crosses looming against the water." The pastel Forgotten was exhibited at the 13th periodic exhibition of the Moscow Society of Art Lovers in 1893–1894 and at Levitan's posthumous exhibition in 1901.

In 1893, Levitan created a large pictorial sketch for the future painting Over Eternal Peace (canvas, oil, 95 × 197 cm, State Tretyakov Gallery, inv. 1487). The composition was based on the second variant sketch Before the Thunderstorm, but with some alterations. The proportion of water surface in the right part was reduced, the distant islet was transformed into a spit connected to the shore, and "the church in the Empire style was replaced by an old wooden kletsky church." In comparison to the final version of the painting, the large sketch – particularly in the right-hand section – has a significantly larger area dedicated to the foreground shore. This sketch was displayed at an exhibition of Russian and Finnish artists in Saint Petersburg in 1898. Sharing his impressions of the exhibition, the artist Nikolay Dubovskoy wrote in a letter to Nikolay Kasatkin on 20 January 1898 that it "impresses with the talent of the exhibitors" and that "the best thing at the exhibition is Levitan's Over Eternal Peace (sketch of a painting)." The sketch was purchased by Pavel Tretyakov at the exhibition and, after the collector's death in 1899, his heirs transferred it to the Tretyakov Gallery.

Furthermore, researchers of Levitan's work consider the sketch Wooden Church in Plyos at the Last Rays of the Sun, painted in 1888 (paper on cardboard, oil, 14 × 24 cm, private collection), a preparatory material for the painting Over Eternal Peace. This sketch was acquired by collector Aleksey Langovoy from the author in 1898. Langovoy recalled that the work had previously been in the Tretyakov Gallery. On the advice of the artist Mikhail Nesterov, Levitan used it to paint the church in his painting Over Eternal Peace. According to Langovoy, "Levitan followed this advice, took back his sketch from P.M. Tretyakov and painted, instead of the usual rural church, this old church of Plyos," whereupon Tretyakov "told Levitan that this sketch had become unnecessary for him and offered to take it back and replace it with another of his choice."

Sketches for the painting "Over Eternal Peace"

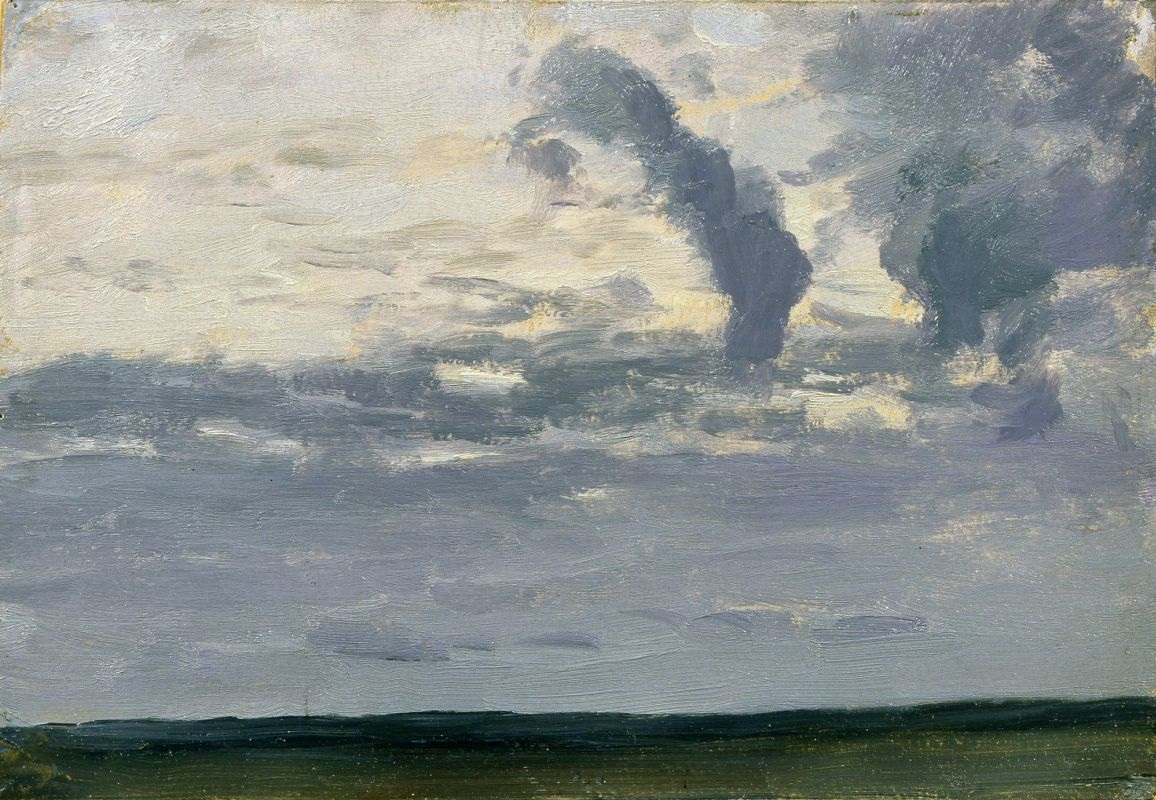
Cloudy sky (1893, State Russian Museum)

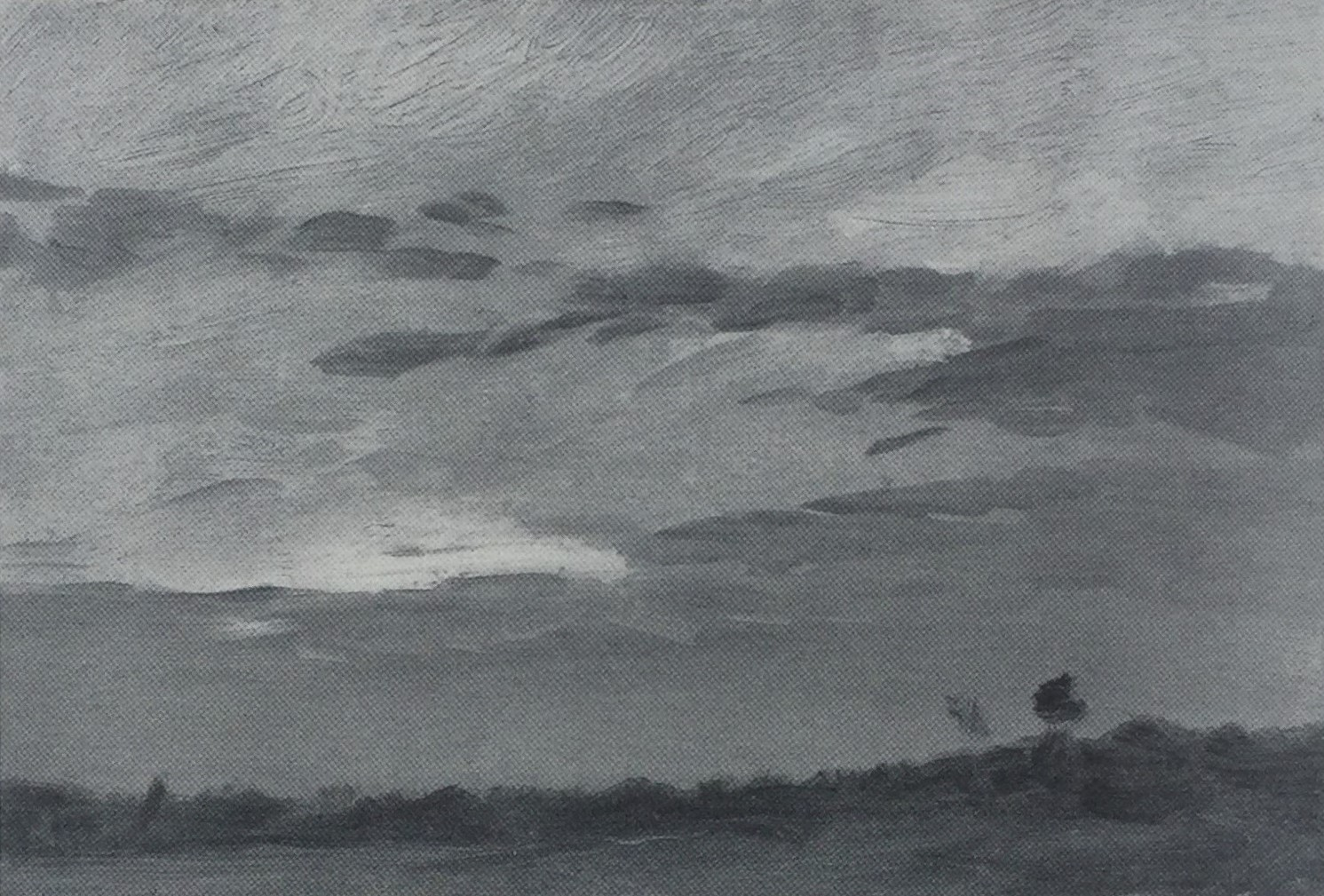
Sky (1893, private collection)

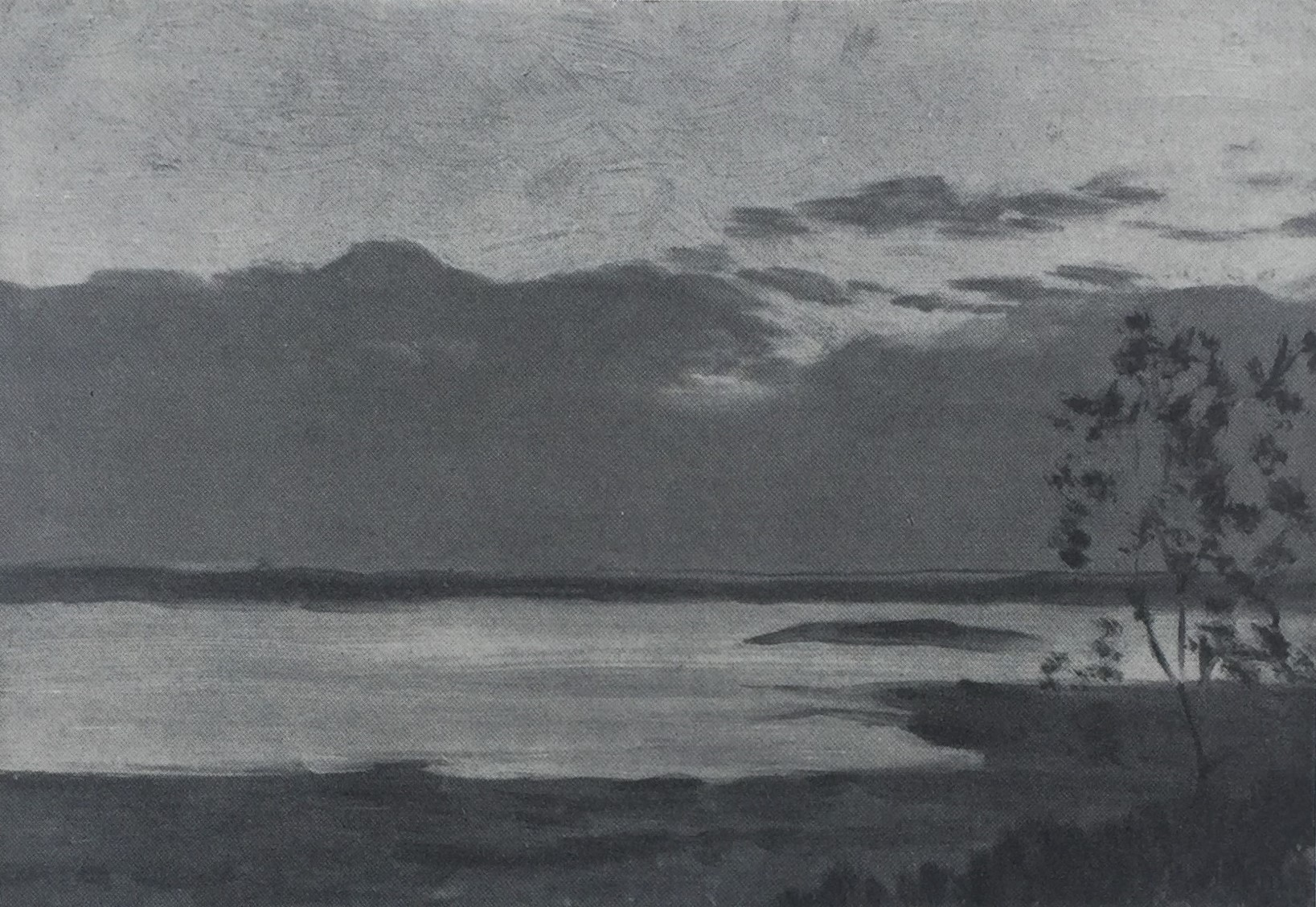
Lake (1893, private collection)

== Reviews ==
In a review of the 22nd exhibition of the Peredvizhniki, published in 1894 in the magazine "The Artist," the writer and publicist Vasily Mikheev called the canvas Over Eternal Peace "a true landscape painting," adding that he knew of no other landscape that met "the requirements of this type" to the same extent. Noting the boldness and originality of the artist's idea, Mikheev wrote that in order to understand this painting, one must enter into it, familiarise oneself with its details in order to feel what "a peculiar and strong chord of 'mood'" all its details create. According to Mikheev, Levitan's painting is "a symphony, strange at first sight, but subtly embracing the soul once you trust its impression." Among the painting's shortcomings, Mikheev considered the artist's representation of the water to be not entirely successful, as well as a certain coarseness of the clouds, in which "one would like to feel <...> more elemental power." However, according to Mikheev, these shortcomings did not prevent Levitan's work from being perceived as "a picture of the human soul in the images of nature" and "an example of great power and originality."

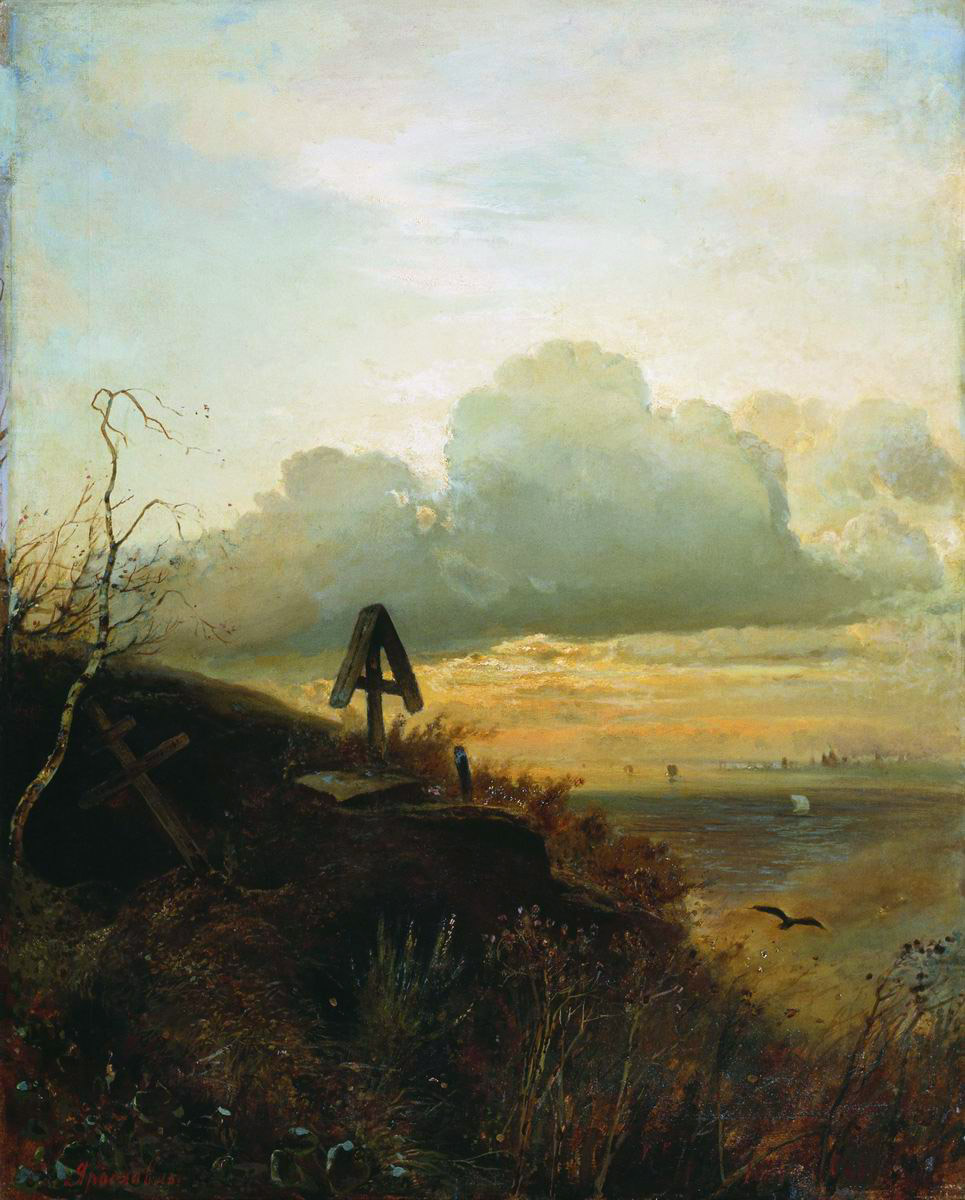
Alexei Savrasov. Grave on the banks of the Volga (1874, State Art Museum of Altai Krai)

In the introductory article to the album dedicated to the centenary of Levitan's birth, the art historian Vladimir Prytkov wrote that in Over Eternal Peace the artist "rises to tragic pathos," seeking "to express in the image of nature philosophical reflections of his time, his epoch." Although Prytkov did not consider this painting to be central to Levitan's oeuvre, he recognised that it was one of the most important works done by the artist. Prytkov noted the "tragic mood" and "symbolic nature of the created image." According to him, Levitan attempted to depict "the eternal contradiction between the majestically beautiful forces of nature and the miserable fate of man in it."

In his 1966 monograph on Levitan's work, art historian Aleksei Fedorov-Davydov wrote that the painting Over Eternal Peace addressed the question of "the relationship of human existence to the eternal life of nature." On the one hand, the artist shows "the grandiose unfolding of the lake's water space and the even more majestic space of the sky," and on the other hand – a small cape with an old church and an abandoned rural cemetery. According to Fedorov-Davydov, "from this juxtaposition of nature and traces of human existence in it, a landscape full of sublime sorrow and tragic heroics is formed." In his opinion, it is in this painting "with all the strength and breadth, in all the maturity of Levitan's skill" unfolded "the idea of comparing human life with the majestic, living its own life and existence, grandiose element of nature."

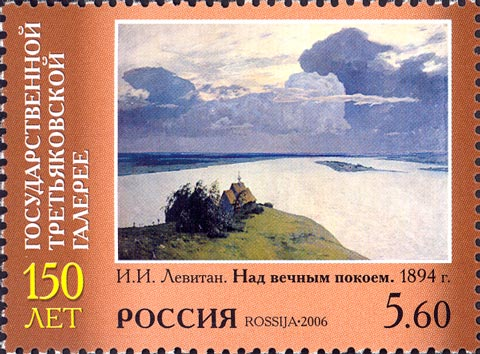
The painting Over Eternal Peace on a Russian postage stamp in 2006

In a comparative analysis of three works from Levitan's "dramatic cycle" of the first half of the 1890s, the art historian Vladimir Petrov wrote that if in the first painting of the trilogy – By The Pool – "the expression of the artist's experiences and understanding of the dissonances and contradictions of existence had a deeply personal, almost irrational character," in the second painting – Vladimirka – the "socio-historical 'dimension' of the pictures" predominates, then in the third and final painting – Over Eternal Peace – "Levitan's dramatic 'thinking in pictures' takes on an almost natural-philosophical, planetary scale in its essence." According to Petrov, the painting Over Eternal Peace, which in many ways echoes Alexei Savrasov's Grave on the banks of the Volga (1874, Altai State Museum of Art), "inherits the tradition of elegiac reflections in art" and is "a truly monumental picture, a kind of epic elegy."

The art historian Vitaly Manin noted that the motif, composition and colour scheme of Over Eternal Peace are "deeply characteristic of Russian nature." Discussing the philosophical significance of the work, he wrote that the image of the painting "evokes many associations, allusions and assumptions." According to Manin, in the "deliberate expressive plasticity of the painting" one can easily read "a sense of the power of the natural element and the meanings implicit in it." In his opinion, Over Eternal Peace is "one of the artist's most expressive works, dynamic and 'associative'."

== Bibliography ==
- Иванов, Л.И. (1963). "В родных местах". Новый Мир (in Russian) (3): 174–200.
- Карлсен, Г.; Кочик, О.Я.; Виктурина, М.П. (1963). "Особенности техники живописи Левитана". Художник (in Russian) (3): 30–34.
- Кац, Л.И. (1983). Художники в Удомельском крае (in Russian). Kalinin: Московский рабочий.
- Левитан, И.И. (1956). Письма, документы, воспоминания (in Russian). Moscow: Искусство.
- Мальцева, Ф.С. (2002). Мастера русского пейзажа. Вторая половина XIX века. Часть 4 (in Russian). Moscow: Искусство. ISBN 9785210013484.
- Манин, В.С. (2001). Русский пейзаж. Энциклопедия мирового искусства (in Russian). Moscow: Белый город. ISBN 5-7793-0293-6.
- Михеев, В.М. (1894). "XXII передвижная выставка Товарищества передвижных художественных выставок" (PDF). Артист (in Russian) (37, book 5): 121–133.
- Петров, В.А. (1992). Исаак Ильич Левитан. Русские живописцы XIX века (in Russian). Saint Petersburg: Художник России. ISBN 5-7370-0212-8.
- Петров, В.А. (2000). Исаак Левитан. Мастера живописи (in Russian). Moscow: Белый город. ISBN 5-7793-0250-2.
- Подушков, Д.Л. (2009). Знаменитые россияне в истории Удомельского края (in Russian). Tver: СФК-офис. ISBN 9785915040082.
- Подушков, Д.Л. (2014). "Художник Исаак Ильич Левитан в Удомле". Левитановские чтения. Материалы научно-практической конференции (3—4 октября 2011 года) (in Russian). Plyos: Плёсский государственный историко-архитектурный и художественный музей-заповедник: 116–126. ISBN 9785897292141.
- Пророкова, С.А. (1960). Левитан. Жизнь замечательных людей (in Russian). Moscow: Молодая гвардия.
- Прытков, В.А. (1960). Исаак Ильич Левитан. К 100-летию со дня рождения (in Russian). Moscow: Советский художник.
- Рогинская, Ф.С. (1989). Товарищество передвижных художественных выставок (in Russian). Moscow: Искусство.
- Сизов, В.И. (1894). "XXII Передвижная выставка Товарищества передвижных художественных выставок". Русские ведомости (110 (23 april)): 3–4.
- Турков, А.М. (1974). Исаак Ильич Левитан. Жизнь в искусстве (in Russian). Moscow: Искусство.
- Фёдоров-Давыдов, А.А. (1966). Исаак Ильич Левитан. Жизнь и творчество. Moscow: Искусство.
- Фёдоров-Давыдов, А.А. (1975). "Картина И. Левитана «Озеро»". Русское и советское искусство. Статьи и очерки (in Russian). Moscow: Искусство. pp. 574–588.
- Фёдоров-Давыдов, А.А. (1986). Русский пейзаж XVIII — начала XX века (in Russian). Moscow: Советский художник.
- Харитонова, Н.С. (2018). Живописная культура Серебряного века (in Russian). Moscow: ВГИК. ISBN 978-5-87149-239-0.
- Чижмак, М.С. (2010). "Хроника жизни и творчества Исаака Левитана" (PDF). Третьяковская галерея (in Russian) (3): 58–71.
- Чуйко, В.В. (1894). "На выставке у передвижников". Всемирная иллюстрация (in Russian). 51 (1314): 230.
- Государственная Третьяковская галерея — каталог собрания (in Russian). Vol. 4: Живопись второй половины XIX века, книга 1, А–М. Красная площадь. 2001. p. 528. ISBN 5-900743-56-X.
