= Lake (painting) =

1899–1900 painting by Isaac Levitan

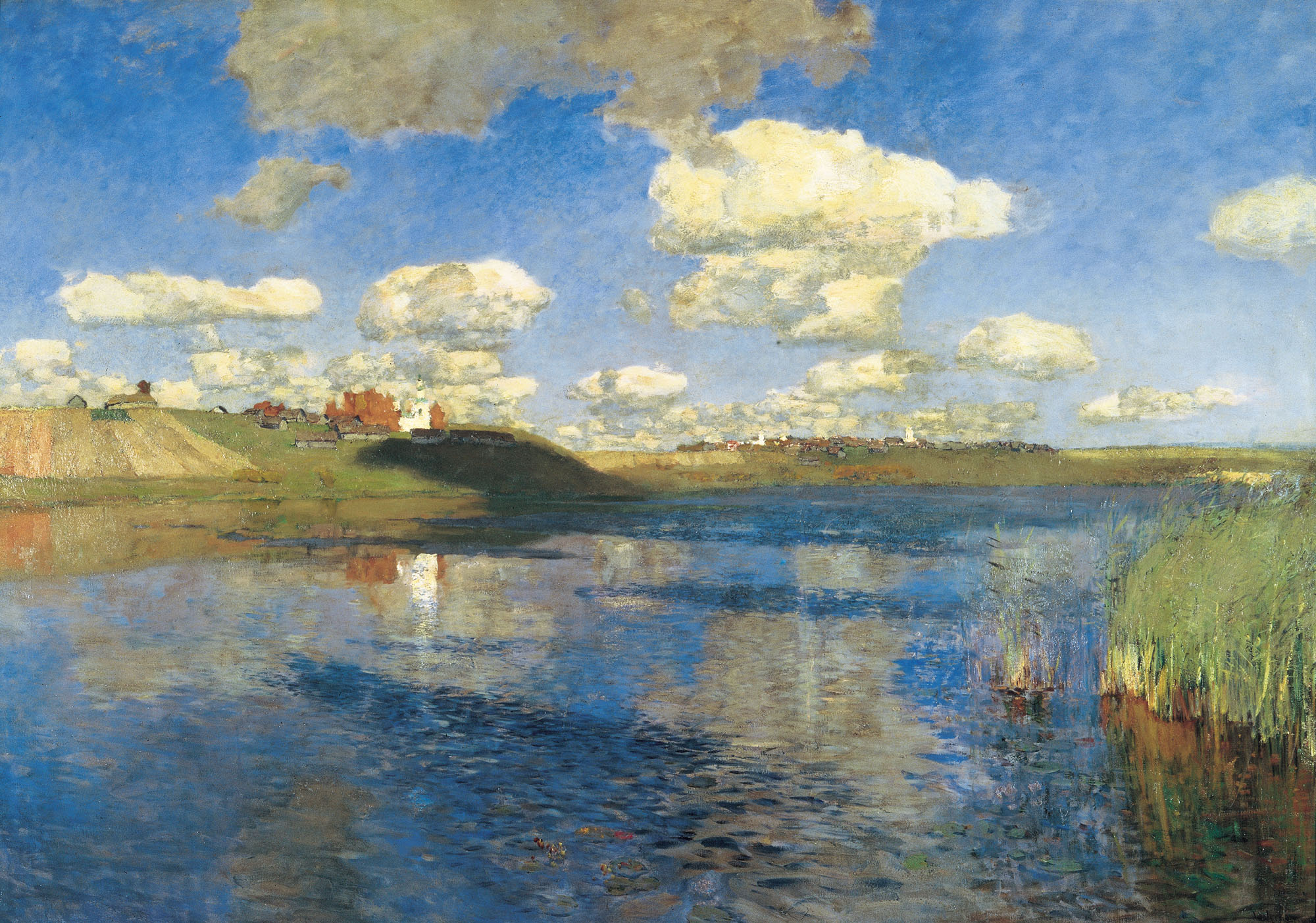
- Artist: Isaac Levitan
- Year: 1899–1900
- Medium: Oil on canvas
- Dimensions: 149 cm × 208 cm (59 in × 82 in)
- Location: State Russian Museum, Saint Petersburg

Lake is a painting by the Russian artist Isaac Levitan (1860–1900), which he worked on in 1899–1900. It is currently held in the State Russian Museum in Saint Petersburg (Inventory Zh-4262). The painting measures 149 × 208 cm. It is also known by other names, including Lake. Rus and Sunny Day. Lake.

The painting Lake was Levitan's last major work, which he painted shortly before his death. Although unfinished, this canvas is considered the main work of the late Levitan and is often referred to as his 'swan song'. The painting was first exhibited under the title 'Sunny Day' at Levitan's posthumous exhibition held in Saint Petersburg and Moscow in 1901.

The painting Lake is one of the artist's three largest works, along with At the Pool (1892) and Over Eternal Peace (1894), which echoes the latter in subject matter. During the process of creating the painting, Levitan used numerous sketches and studies, including a large sketch, held in the Nizhny Novgorod State Art Museum and a small preliminary version of the painting, kept in the State Tretyakov Gallery.

Art historian Aleksei Fedorov-Davydov considered the painting Lake to be 'a remarkable creation by Levitan' and wrote that it 'immediately makes a great and strong impression on the viewer, as a powerful and beautiful image of Russian nature.' According to art historian Mikhail Alpatov, in the painting Lake Levitan managed to give 'a collective image of his homeland' – in it you can see 'the past of Russia, its present, nature, and man', in this work 'both the personal experiences of the artist, and the very festive beauty of the world merged.'

== History ==
=== Preceding events and work on the painting ===
Levitan was interested in the subject of the lake from the early 1890s. In 1893, he painted a relatively large canvas titled At the Lake (oil on canvas, 109 × 163 cm, Radishchev Art Museum). In 1894, Levitan completed the painting Over Eternal Peace (oil on canvas, 150 × 206 cm, State Tretyakov Gallery), which depicted a wide expanse of water. It is unclear whether it was a lake or a river. The artist worked on this canvas on Lake Udomlya near Vyshny Volochok. The theme of the lake appears in several of the artist's works following his visit to Lake Como in northern Italy. These include Lake Como (oil on canvas, 1895, 96 × 128 cm, State Russian Museum), Gloomy Day (pastel, 1895, 48 × 62 cm, State Russian Museum), and Forest Lake (oil on canvas, 1890s, 48 × 80 cm, Rostov Regional Museum of Fine Arts).

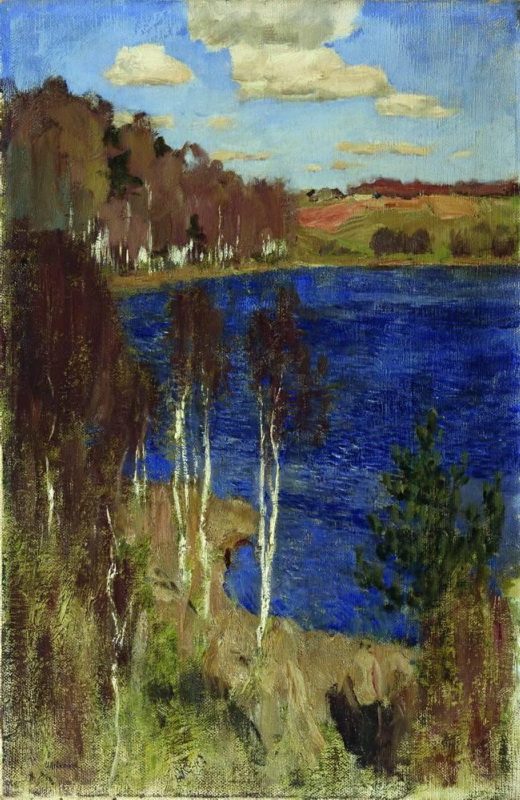
Lake. Spring (1898, Penza Regional Art Gallery named after K. A. Savitsky)

During the summer of 1898, Levitan resided in the Bogorodskoye estate, situated in Klinsky Uyezd, Moscow Governorate, in close proximity to the Podsolnechnaya railway station (now within the city limits of Solnechnogorsk), on the shores of Senezh Lake. The estate was owned by the Olenin family – Vladimir Alexandrovich (great-grandson of Alexey Olenin, State Secretary and President of the Imperial Academy of Arts) and his wife Elizaveta Dmitrievna, née Skaryatina. In a letter to the writer Anton Chekhov dated 23 June 1898, (Note: The Julian calendar ("old style") is used to date events that took place in the Russian Empire.) Levitan reported: 'I live in a wonderful place here: on the shore of a very high huge lake, with forests all around me, and the lake is teeming with fish...' A similar description can be found in Levitan's letter to the artist Elena Karzinkina, dated 5 July 1898: 'I live in a very nice place: a big lake, mountains, forests, complete silence, even too much (but soon all this will be gone – the owners, the Olenins, will come), but still, it's very nice here.'

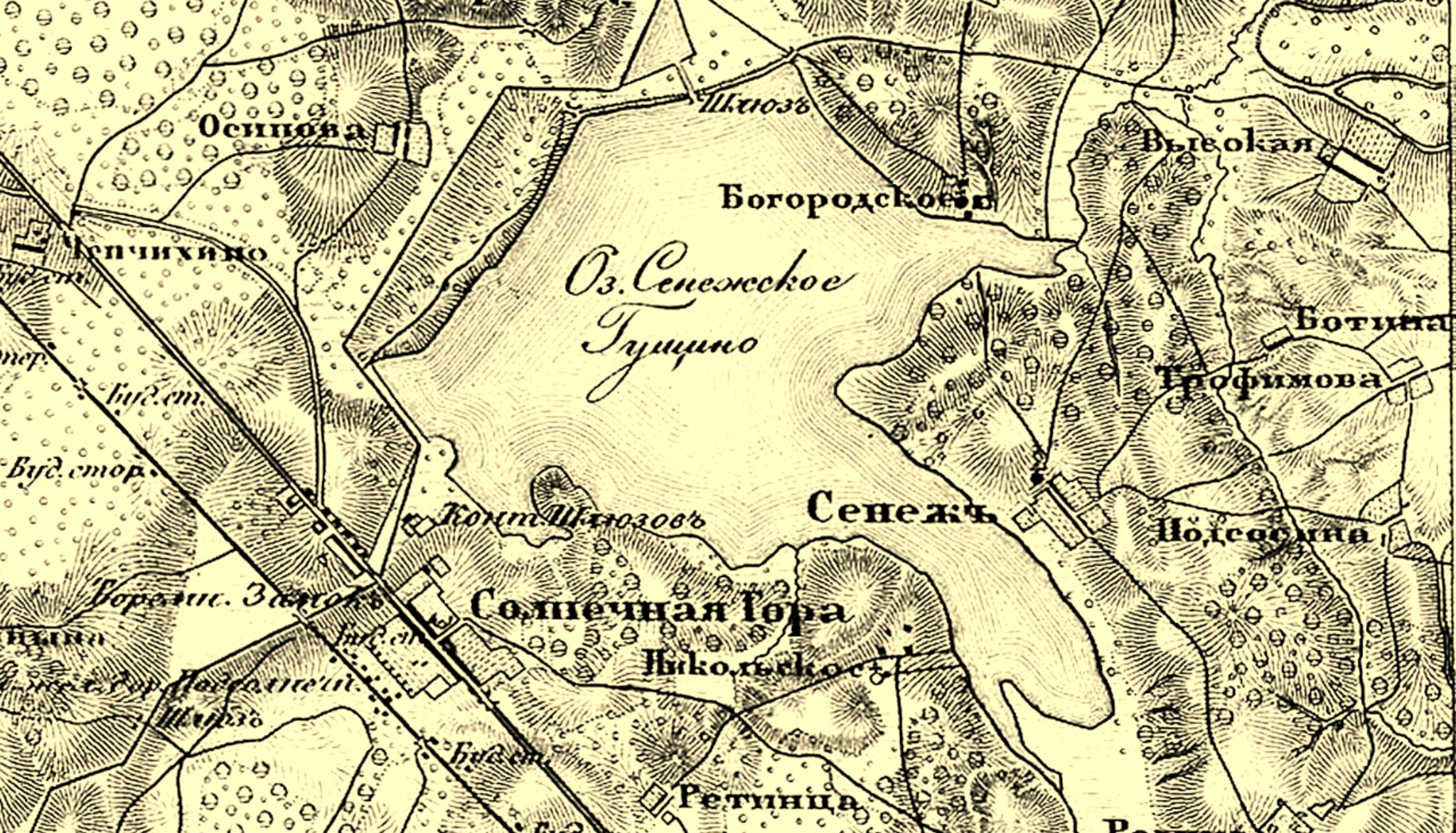
Senezh Lake (Senezhskoye Gushchino) on the 1860 topographical map (Bogorodskoye is on the north-eastern shore).

In Bogorodskoye, Levitan painted several landscapes, including the painting Lake. Spring (canvas, oil, 1898, 91 × 59 cm, Penza Regional Art Gallery named after K. A. Savitsky). Researchers consider this painting as one of the preparatory works for the future painting Lake. Art historian Aleksei Fedorov-Davydov recognised the complex and synthetic nature of the image presented by Levitan on the canvas Lake, and the composition of the landscape depicted on it. Fedorov-Davydov wrote that this landscape 'appears much more natural' than in the painting Over Eternal Peace. According to him, in the painting Lake, Levitan 'unconsciously reproduced <...> some kind of experienced visual impression', which could be 'the general experience he had at the Senezh Lake in the summer of 1898.'

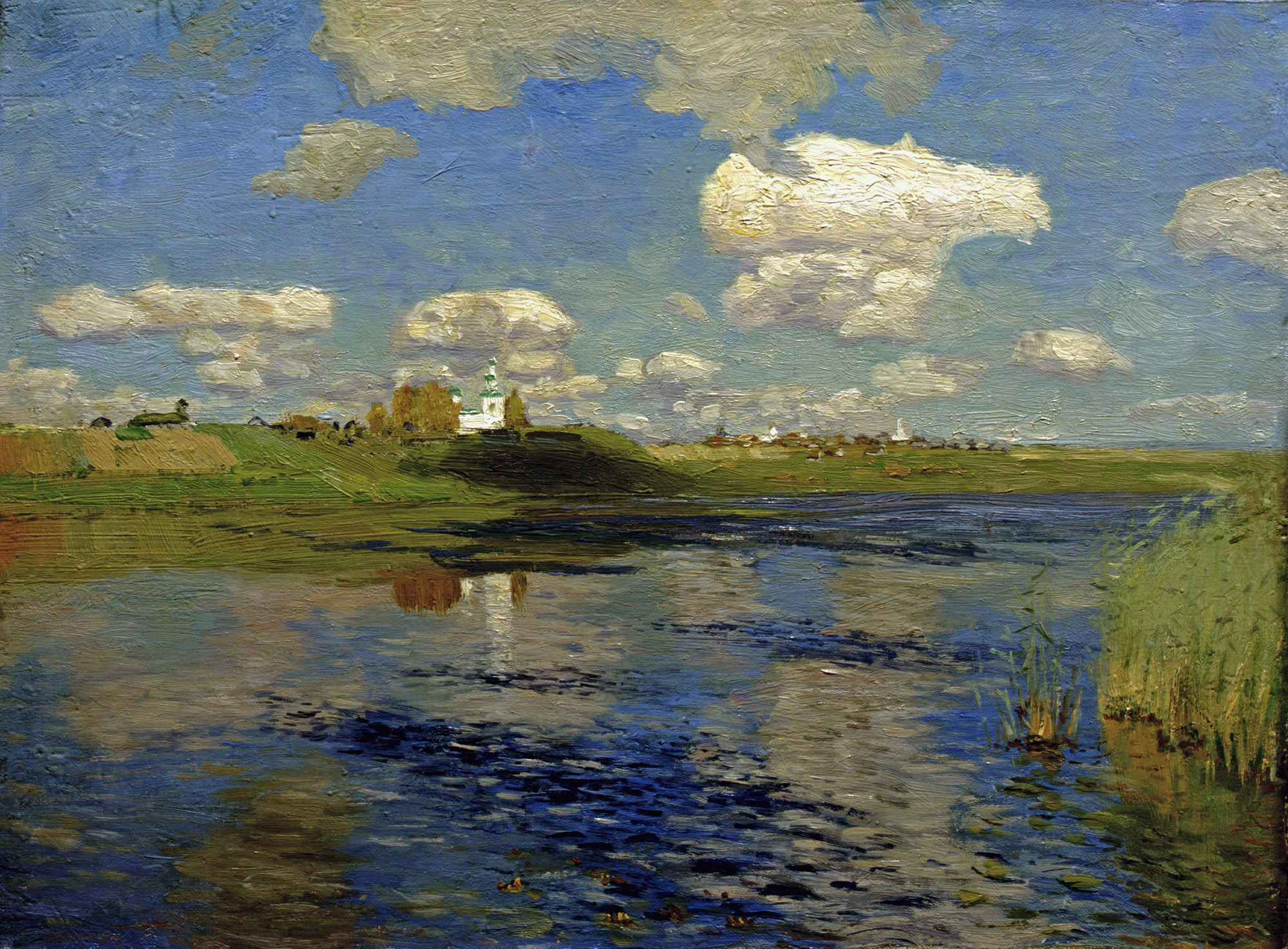
Lake (first version of the painting, 1898–1899, State Tretyakov Gallery)

Levitan began teaching at the Moscow School of Painting, Sculpture and Architecture (MUZHVZ) in September 1898, where he led the landscape class. According to the memories of one of Levitan's pupils, the artist Boris Lipkin, in early 1899, Levitan assigned his students the task of creating an illustration for Alexander Pushkin's poem 'The Cloud.' In the same year, in preparation for the student exhibition, Levitan showed Lipkin a large sketch made for the painting Lake, noting that it related to the same theme for which he had given the assignment. According to Lipkin's recollections, Levitan told him: 'I've been working on this subject for a long time, I wanted to call this thing 'Rus', but maybe it's a bit pretentious, it's better to keep it simple somehow.' According to literary scholar Andrei Turkov, Levitan's idea may have been connected to his work on illustrating the collection of Pushkin's works. This edition was being prepared by Pyotr Konchalovsky for the 100th anniversary of the poet's birth. Aleksei Fedorov-Davydov disagreed with Lipkin's claim that Levitan's sketch was thematically linked to Pushkin's 'The Cloud'. Fedorov-Davydov argued that 'the image of the painting in no way resembles this poem,' as the artist depicted light clouds rather than a cloud or the state of nature after a thunderstorm. According to Fedorov-Davydov, the landscape was 'least of all illustrative' and 'looked like real nature above all.'

In April 1899, Levitan travelled to the village of Okulovka in Krestetsky Uyezd, Novgorod Governorate. He spent the remainder of spring and most of the summer there, creating paintings such as Twilight. Moon, Twilight. Stacks, Summer Evening, and Twilight. Levitan also worked on preparatory sketches for the future canvas Lake. In August of the same year, the artist returned to Moscow.

In 1889, entrepreneur and patron of the arts Sergei Morozov allocated Levitan a house workshop in Bolshoy Trisvyatitelsky Lane in Moscow, where he worked on the final version of the painting Lake. In early February 1900, the natural scientist Kliment Timiryazev, accompanied by his wife and son, visited the artist's studio. Among the many unfinished paintings, Timiryazev saw a large painting titled Lake. The scientist particularly liked the sketch for this painting, which stood out for its 'rich, iridescent range of colours.' Levitan worked on the canvas Lake until early May 1900. During this time, he visited his landscape class students in Khimki, who worked on a plein-air at a rented cottage. There, Levitan caught a cold which led to a severe complication of heart disease. He returned to Moscow but was unable to recover and died on 22 July (4 August) 1900. Following his death, approximately 40 unfinished paintings (including Lake) and around three hundred sketches were found in his studio.

=== Posthumous exhibition and subsequent events ===
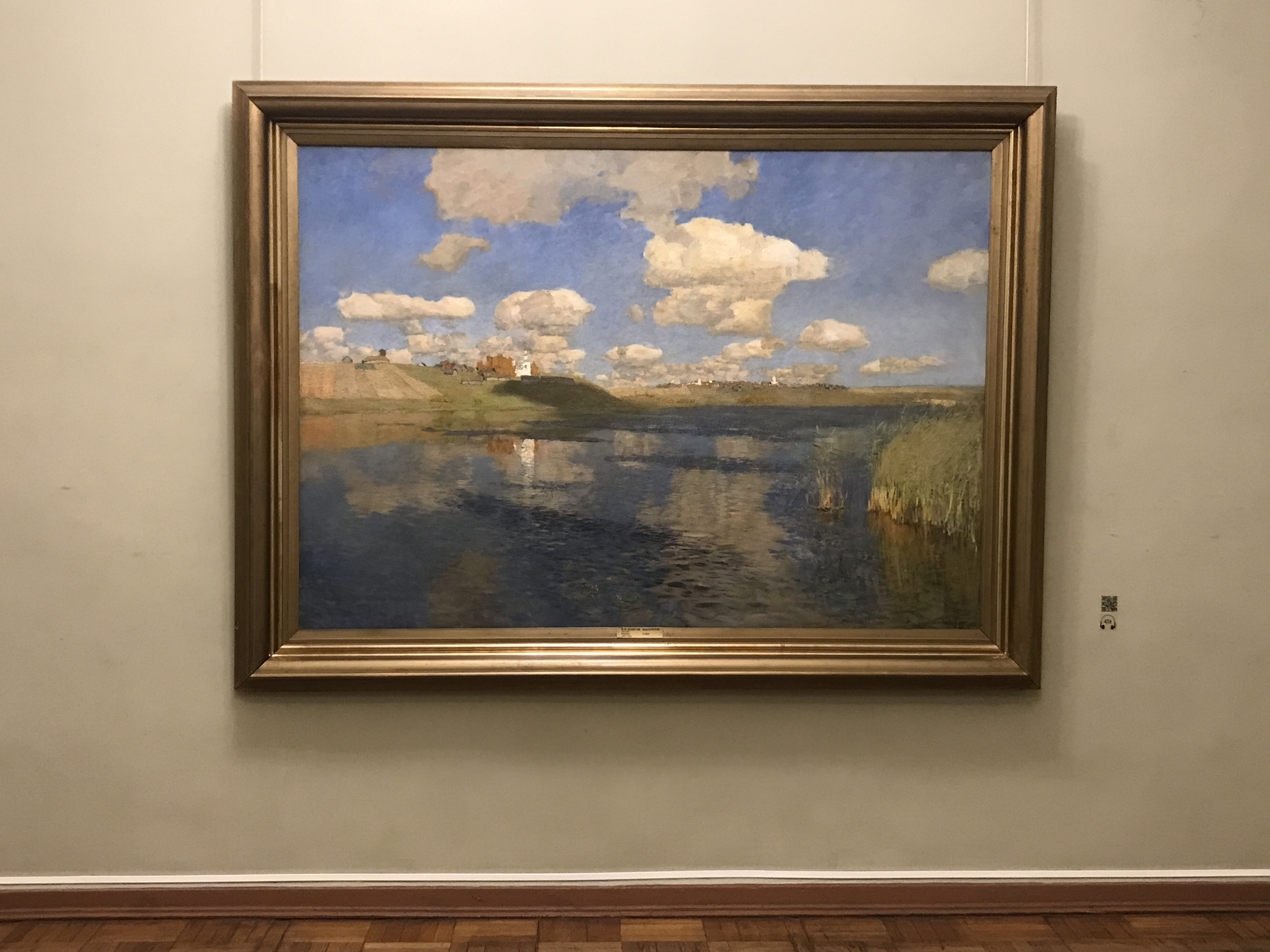
The painting Lake in the State Russian Museum

The painting Lake, under the title Sunny Day, was first exhibited at Levitan's posthumous exhibition in Saint Petersburg and Moscow in 1901. The exhibition showcased over 140 paintings and numerous sketches, with the first part held in the halls of the Imperial Academy of Arts and the second part in the premises of the Moscow Society of Art Lovers. Directly after the exhibition, the canvas was bought by Adolf (Abel) Levitan (the artist's brother) for the Russian Museum of Emperor Alexander III (now the State Russian Museum). On the reverse of the canvas is a note: 'Levitan No. 27 'Sunny Day' 2200 rubles.' A reproduction of the painting, titled Lake, was published in the magazine "The World of Art" (No. 1 for 1901).

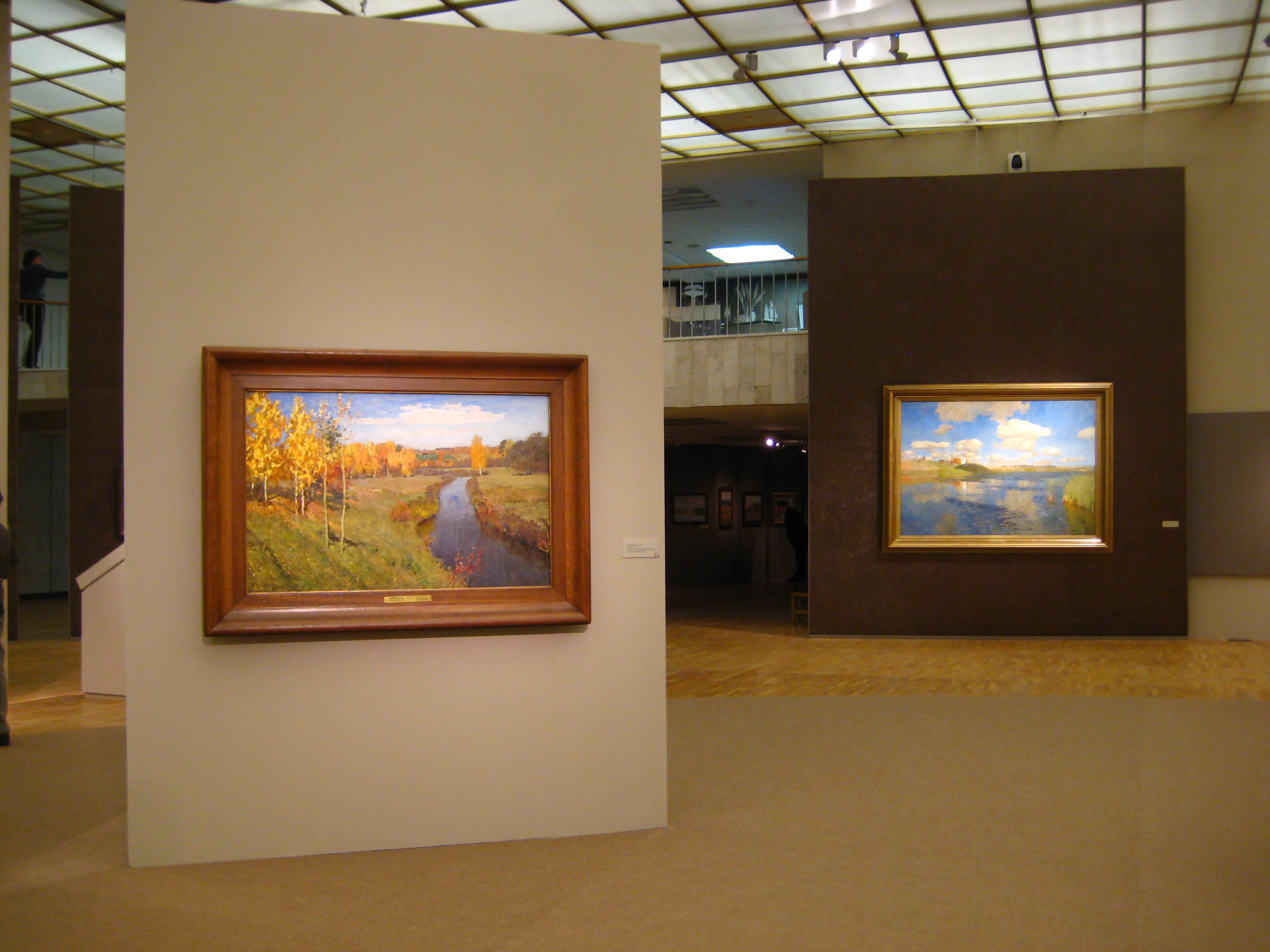
Paintings Golden Autumn and Lake at the 2010–2011 exhibition at the State Tretyakov Gallery on Krymsky Val

The painting 'Lake' was subsequently exhibited at several exhibitions, including Levitan's personal exhibitions in 1938 at the State Tretyakov Gallery and in 1939 at the State Russian Museum in Leningrad. It was also displayed at the jubilee exhibition commemorating the 100th anniversary of the artist's birth, held in 1960–1961 in Moscow, Leningrad, and Kyiv. However, it was not included in the catalogue and only appeared in the Leningrad section of the exhibition. The painting was exhibited during the 150th anniversary of Levitan's birth at the Benois Building of the State Russian Museum (April–July 2010) and the New Tretyakov Gallery on Krymsky Val (October 2010 – March 2011). An opinion poll of visitors to the exhibition was conducted during the anniversary event. The poll results show that only two paintings from the Russian Museum, Overgrown Pond (7th place) and Lake (10th place), were among the top ten favourite works of the artist. The other eight paintings in the top ten are part of the Tretyakov Gallery's collection.

According to Levitan's contemporaries, ten years after the artist's death, the painting Lake had 'darkened, withered in some places, and lost much of its original luminosity and brightness.' Subsequently, the canvas underwent several restorations, including before Levitan's personal exhibition of 1938 in Moscow and in 1958, when the leading restorer of the State Russian Museum, Anany Brindarov, restored the painting. The painting Lake is currently exhibited in Room 40 of the Rossi wing alongside other works by Isaac Levitan, such as Golden Autumn. Slobodka, Moonlight Night. A Village, and Silence.

== Description ==
The composition of the painting Lake consists of three distinct planes. The first plane is shaded and features bulrush and water ripples, with the shadow of a cloud cast upon them. The second plane depicts a sunlit expanse of water in a large lake. Finally, the third and farthest background shows elevated shores with fields, arable land, groves, and villages, including houses and churches. Clouds float in the blue sky and are reflected in the lake water. At the upper edge of the canvas, a large dark cloud joins a large white cloud to its right.

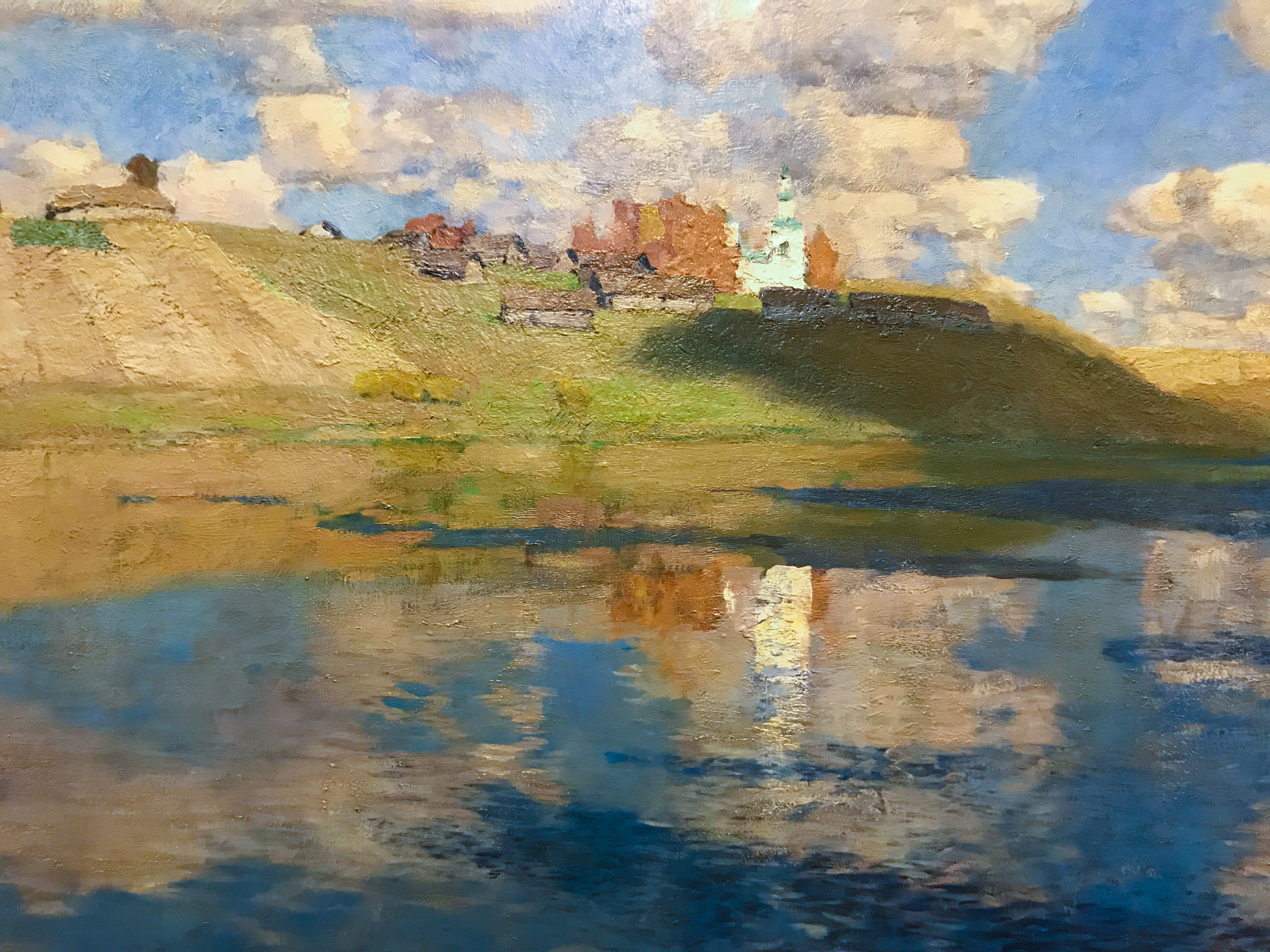
A detail of the painting Lake

Compared to the original sketch, where the sky was perceived as a background, the final version gives it a more prominent role. Numerous clouds appear to float out from the horizon, as if catching up with each other. This creates a feeling that they are moving towards the viewer and even going beyond the canvas. According to Aleksei Fedorov-Davydov, 'the theme of clouds with their movement, shadows and reflections begins to occupy an essential, if not equal, place in the general structure of the landscape, along with the image of the shores and surface of the lake covered with fields and enlivened by buildings;' this theme is an important part of the landscape image and 'a means of its expressiveness.' The clouds and other objects in the foreground (reeds and reflections in the water), which act as 'frames', are fragmented and cut off by the edge of the canvas: 'This impressionistic technique gives the impression of a continuation of the painting outside the frame.'

Art historians have noted the synthetic nature of the landscape depicted in the painting, which is manifested not only in the fact that it is 'composed' of several nature studies, but also in the 'collective, generalising nature of the image itself, its ideological synthesis,' in the fact that it represents the image of a whole country – which is why Levitan originally wanted to call it 'Rus.' Furthermore, the state of nature has been synthesised to some extent. The yellow hue of the leaves and the withered fields suggest that it is autumn, while the lighting and clouds resemble those of summer. It is possible that the artist intentionally chose a day during the 'Indian summer', a period when 'the solemnity of autumn still retains the charm of summer.'

The painting's colour scheme is based on blue, brown, green, yellow, and violet tones. The artist aimed to use bright and pure colours, even painting white clouds in different tones – yellowish in illuminated areas and violet in shaded ones. Fields and meadows are depicted in yellow-brown and green colours, while tree foliage is painted in orange-brown tones. Villages on the opposite shore of the lake feature red-brown houses, and churches are visible as white spots. The water is portrayed in blue with ripples and multi-coloured reflections. Levitan repainted the water many times, adding and removing water lilies in the foreground. Upon closer inspection, the seemingly decorative colour zones are designed with subtle transitions and nuances.

The painting Lake is executed with large, broad strokes that emphasize the weight and materiality of the subject. The sunlit clouds and white church are particularly massive and corpulent. The artist employed a complex technique, including repeated corpuscular painting and glazing. To convey the restless ripples of the water, the artist applied repeated brushstrokes of various shades of blue, violet, grey-green and pink over the light blue preparatory layer. In certain areas, particularly in the depiction of reeds, the texture was confused due to repeated scribing on the relief hull layer without prior stripping. Additionally, overloading of the colour layer resulted in a loss of elasticity. Furthermore, the later prescriptions did not bond sufficiently with the lower layers, resulting in craquelures and crumbling of the repeated inscriptions, which required restoration work.

== Studies, sketches and variants ==
The State Tretyakov Gallery possesses three studies for the painting Lake: Windy Day (paper on canvas, oil, 1898–1899, 14 × 18 cm, Inventory No. 5341, received in 1917 from the collection of the family of Mikhail Morozov and Margarita Morozova), The Last Rays. The Lake (paper on cardboard, oil, 17.6 × 26.2 cm, Inventory No. 9117, received in 1927 through the State Museum Fund from the State Museum of Modern Western Art; it was previously in the collection of Ivan Morozov) and A Clear Autumn Day (wood, oil, 12.5 × 27.3 cm, Inventory Zh-123, acquired in 1961 from Moscow collector A. V. Gordon. It was previously in the collection of N. A. Sokolov).

Studies for the painting Lake

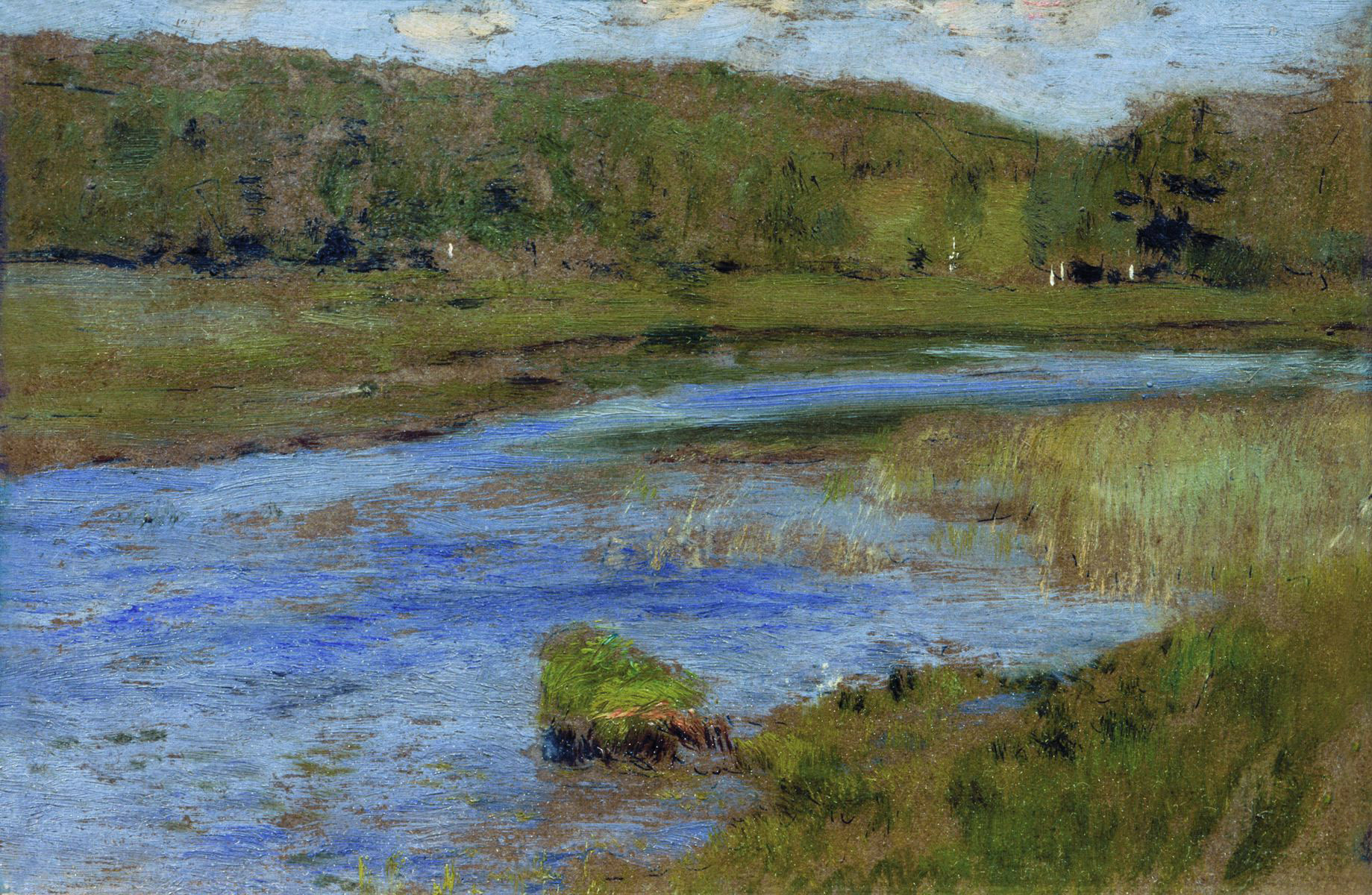
Windy Day (State Tretyakov Gallery)

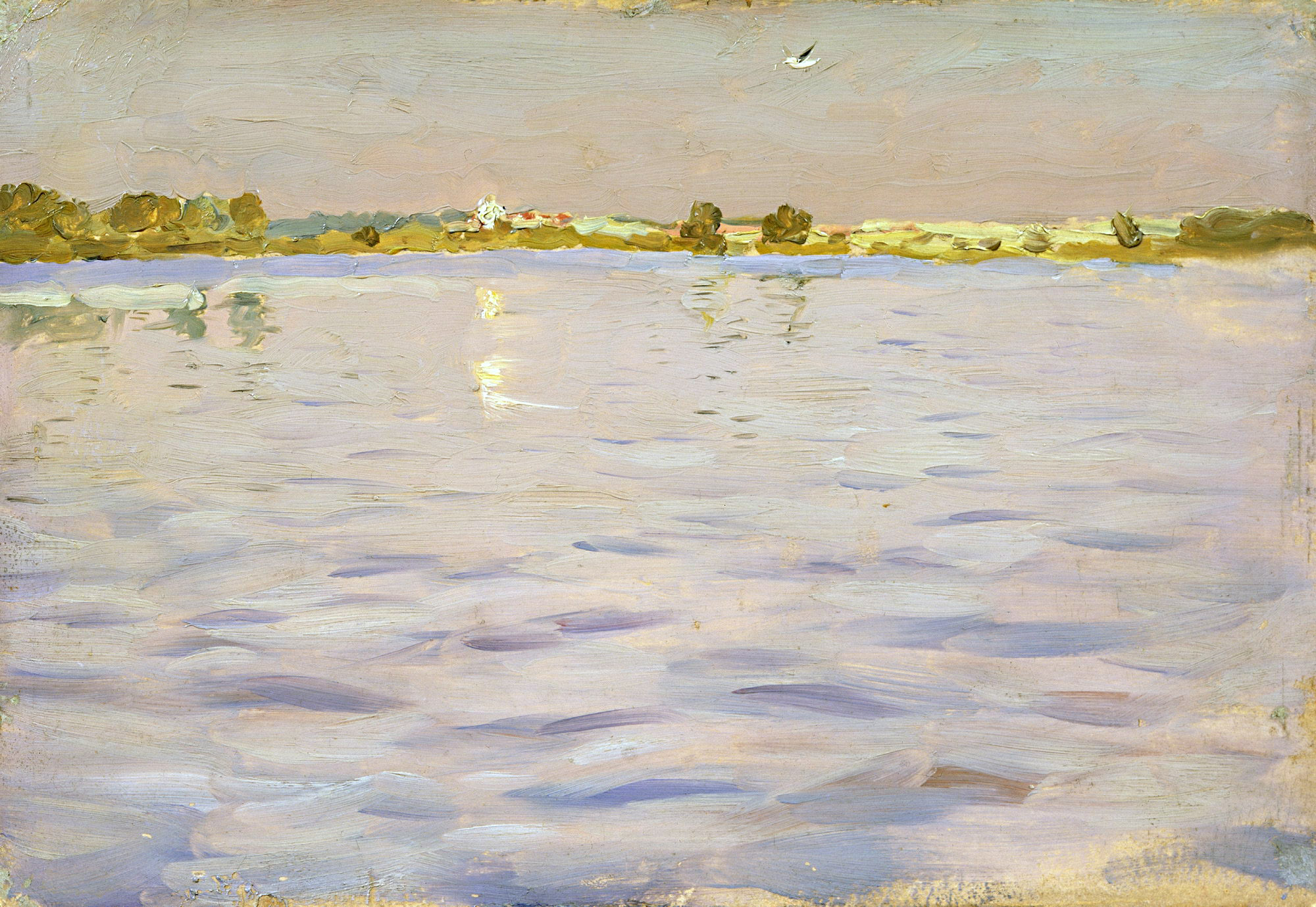
The Last Rays. A Lake (State Tretyakov Gallery)

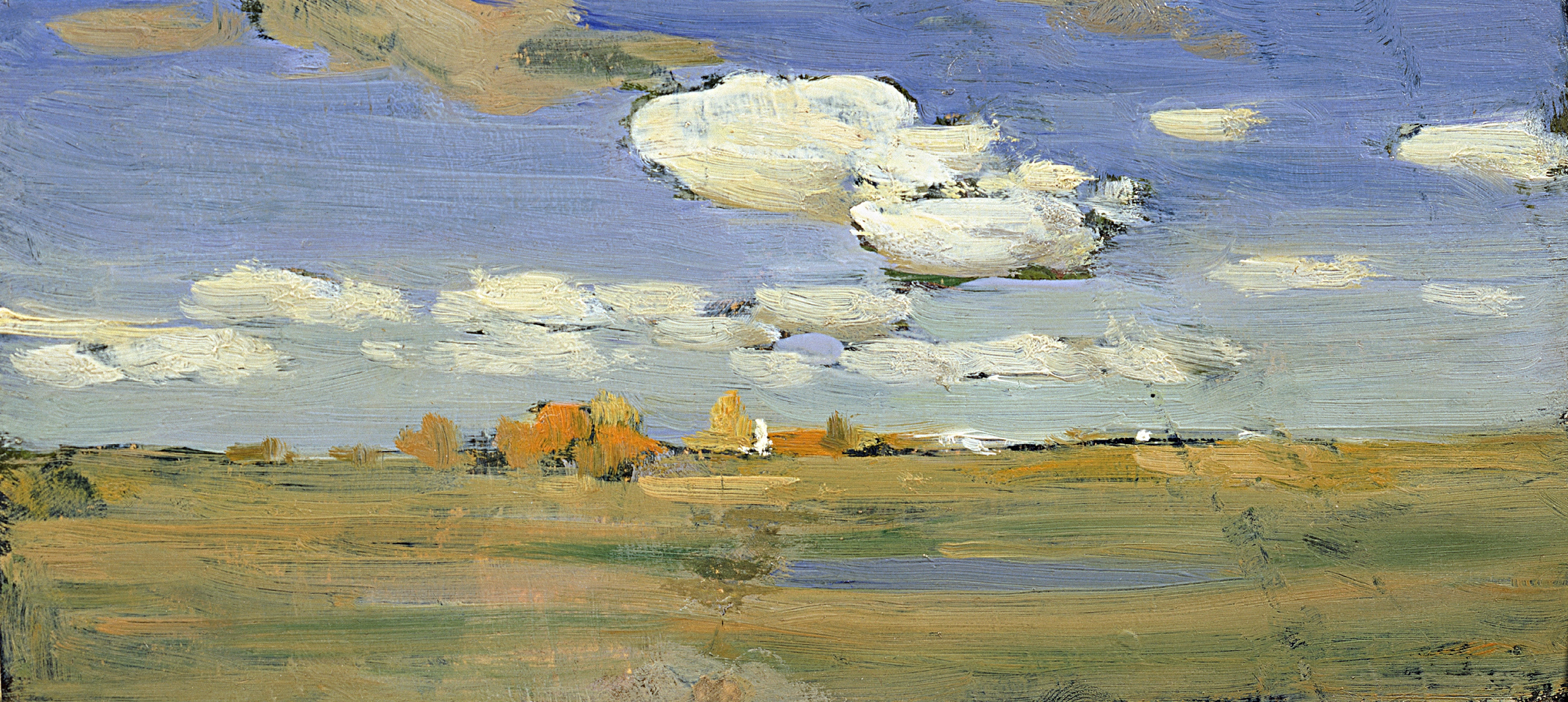
A Clear Autumn Day (State Tretyakov Gallery)

The Vyatka Art Museum, named after V. M. and A. M. Vasnetsov, houses the study Lake. Windy Day (cardboard, oil, 1898–1899, 11.3 × 17 cm, Inventory Zh-167). The Altai Krai State Art Museum has a study titled Clouds (canvas on cardboard, oil, 1890s, 21.5 × 31.2 cm, Inventory Zh-1324; according to other data – 1899, 21 × 31.5 cm) in its collection.

The catalogue of Levitan's jubilee exhibition in 1960 listed two additional studies among the preparatory works for the painting Lake, dated 1898–1899: Autumn. River (canvas, oil, 32 × 46.5 cm, collection of T. V. Geltser, previously in the collections of E. V. Geltser and A. N. Lyapunov) and Lake (paper on cardboard, oil, 15 × 22.5 cm, State Russian Museum, previously in the collection of N. Balashov). However, according to the compilers of the later catalogue of the Russian Museum, the study Lake was not intended for the painting of the same name, but for the painting Gray Day (1890s, Apartment Museum of Isaak Brodsky, Saint Petersburg).

The Nizhny Novgorod State Art Museum collection includes a sketch titled Lake (canvas, oil, 48.6 × 69.7 cm or 48.8 × 69.7 cm, inv. Zh-1157). The sketch was acquired by the museum in 1954 from the Ministry of Culture of the RSFSR. It is dated 1898, 1899 or 1898–1899 in different sources.

A sketch and studies for the painting Lake

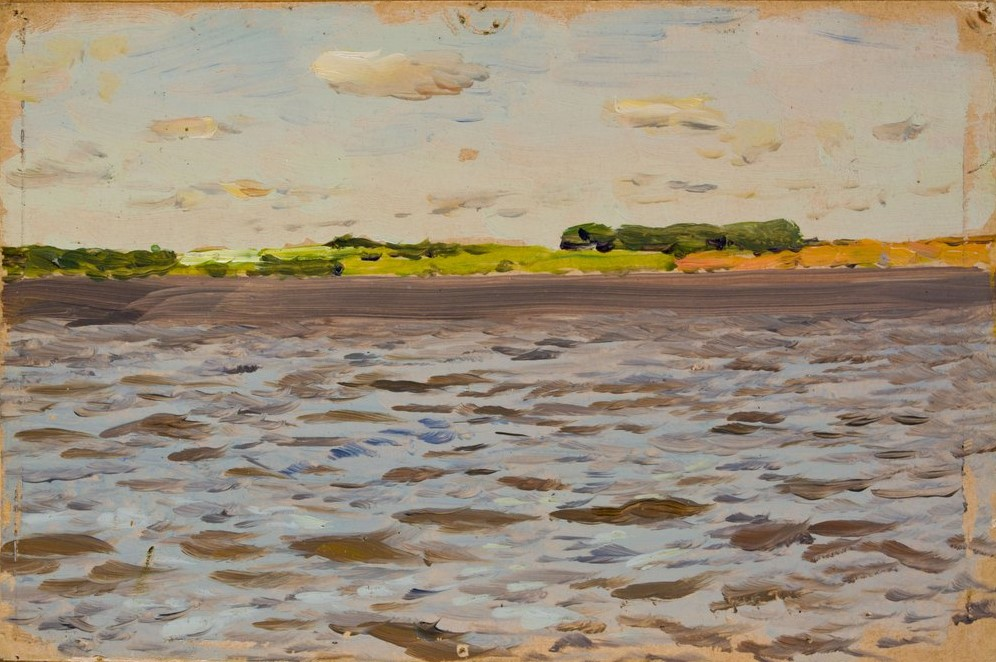
Lake. Windy Day (study, Vyatka Art Museum, named after V. M. and A. M. Vasnetsov)

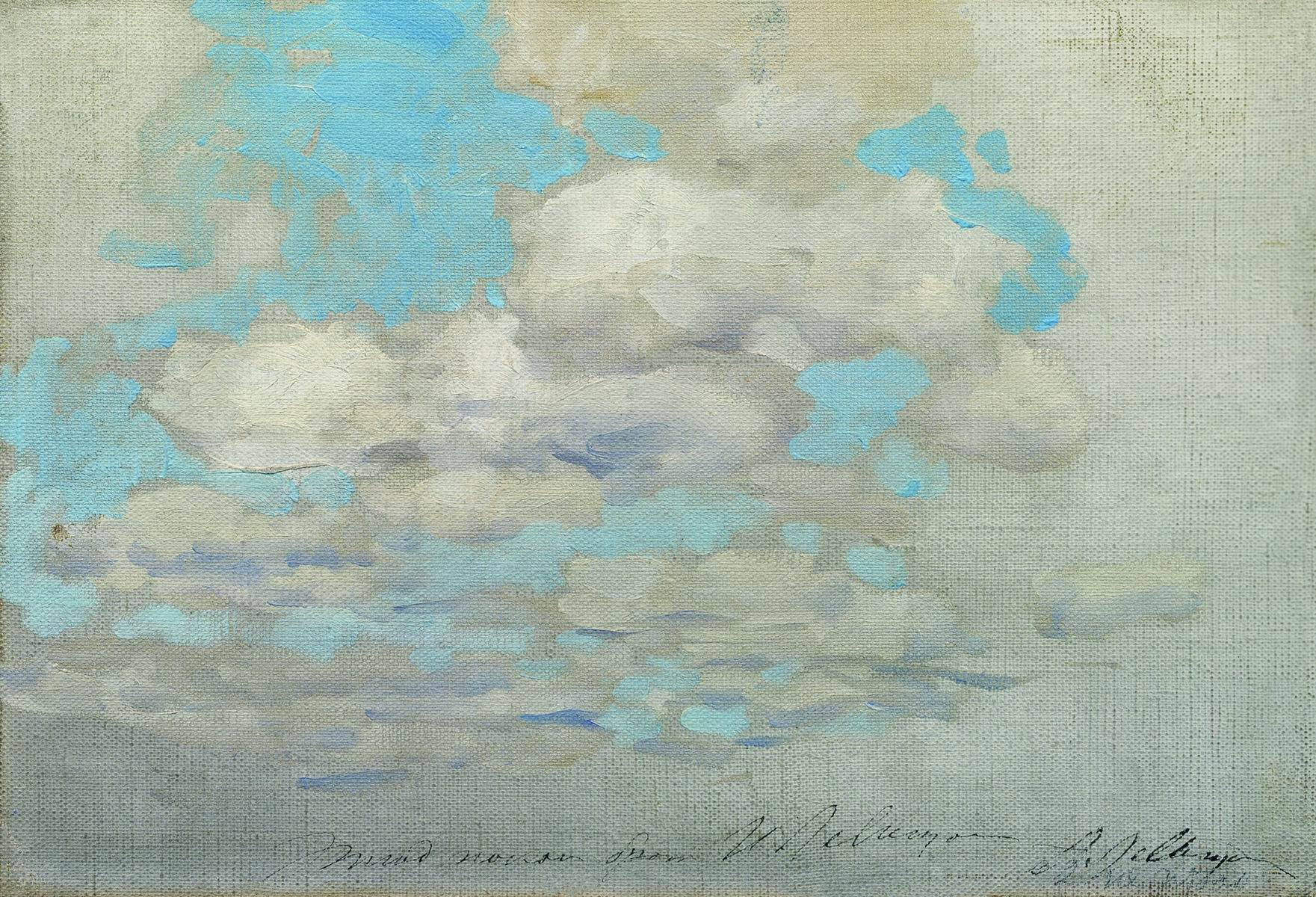
Clouds (study, State Art Museum of Altai Krai)

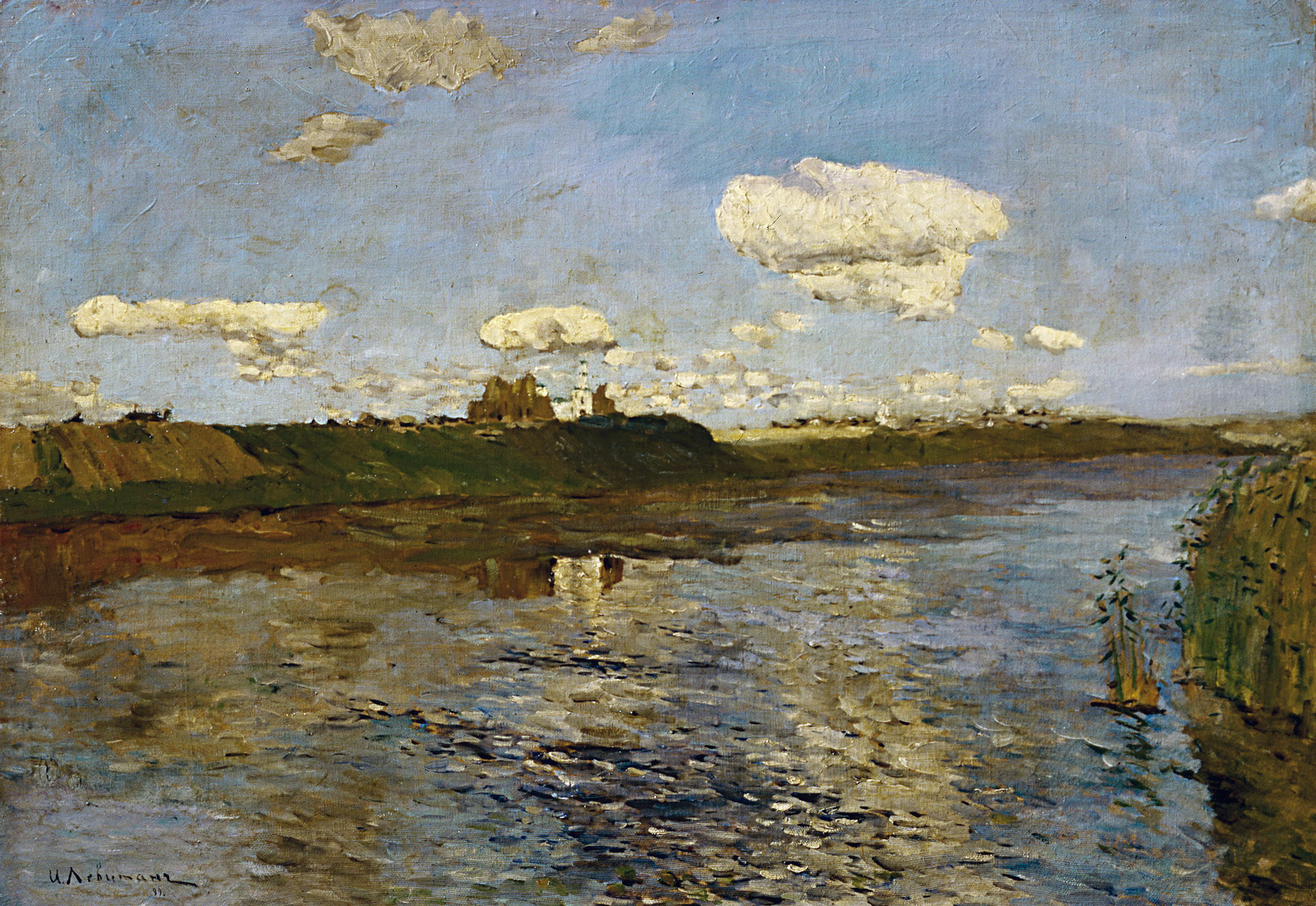
Lake (sketch, Nizhny Novgorod State Art Museum)

The State Tretyakov Gallery houses the initial version of the painting Lake (canvas, oil, 1898–1899, 27 × 36.5 cm, inv. Zh-552). It was displayed at the artist's posthumous exhibition in St. Petersburg and Moscow in 1901. Subsequently, it was held in the collections of I. I. Troyanovsky, K. I. Troyanovskaya, V. N. Vinogradov, and O. F. Vinogradova before being acquired by the Tretyakov Gallery in 1968.

== Reviews ==
The art historian Aleksei Fedorov-Davydov called the painting Lake one of the 'remarkable creations of Levitan' and wrote that this canvas 'immediately makes a great and strong impression on the viewer, as a powerful and beautiful image of Russian nature.' According to Fedorov-Davydov, in this painting – Levitan's 'swan song' – the artist 'reaffirmed the ideals with which his art was imbued and left it as a testament, alongside the new artistic problems, during the solving of which death overtook him.' Fedorov-Davydov noted that Levitan had succeeded in giving the composed landscape an apparent unity, but that at the same time the artist had not been able to fully overcome the painting's overload and connect 'all the complex and contradictory moments and means of solving his painting.'

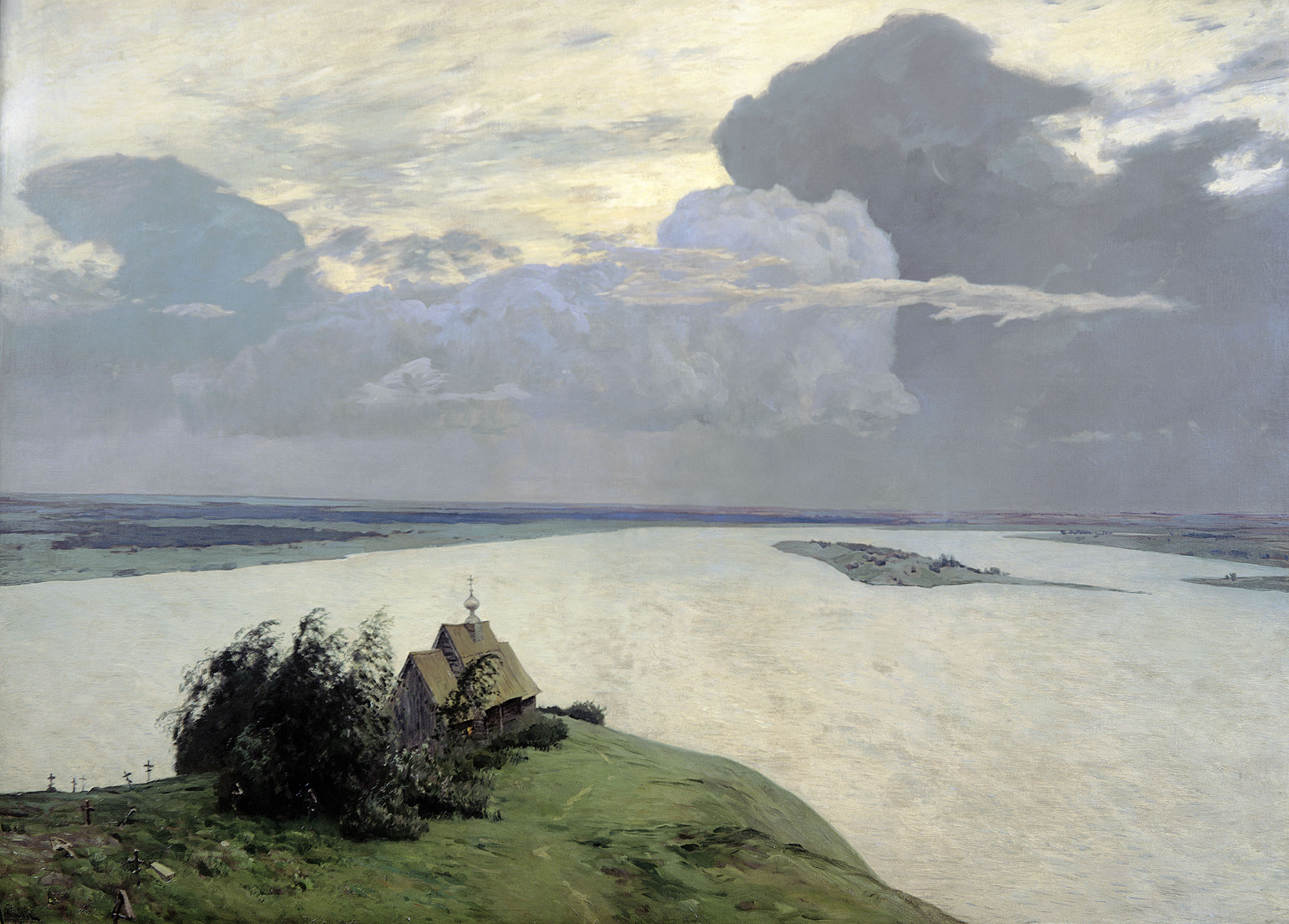
Over Eternal Peace (1894, State Tretyakov Gallery)

According to art historian Mikhail Alpatov, in the painting Lake, Levitan's pictorial skills 'look exceptionally mature and strengthened.' Unlike the earlier painting Over Eternal Peace, in which the grandeur of nature evokes a sense of human weakness, Lake is perceived as 'a true song of joyful, triumphant, festive nature.' According to Alpatov, in the canvas Lake Levitan managed to give 'a collective image of his homeland' – in it you can see 'the past of Russia, its present, nature, and man,' in this work 'both the personal experiences of the artist, and the very festive beauty of the world merged.'

Art historian Vladimir Petrov called the canvas Lake the main work of the late Levitan, noting that the artist achieved 'monumental lyricism of the image,' trying to combine 'almost impressionistic immediacy of freshness and brightness of a sunny day' with a decorative and monumental approach that links this picture to the traditions of ancient fresco painting. Agreeing with Alpatov, Petrov wrote that Lake could be considered an 'antinomic pair' in relation to the painting Over Eternal Peace, because in it one hears not mournful but 'triumphantly major music of nature.'

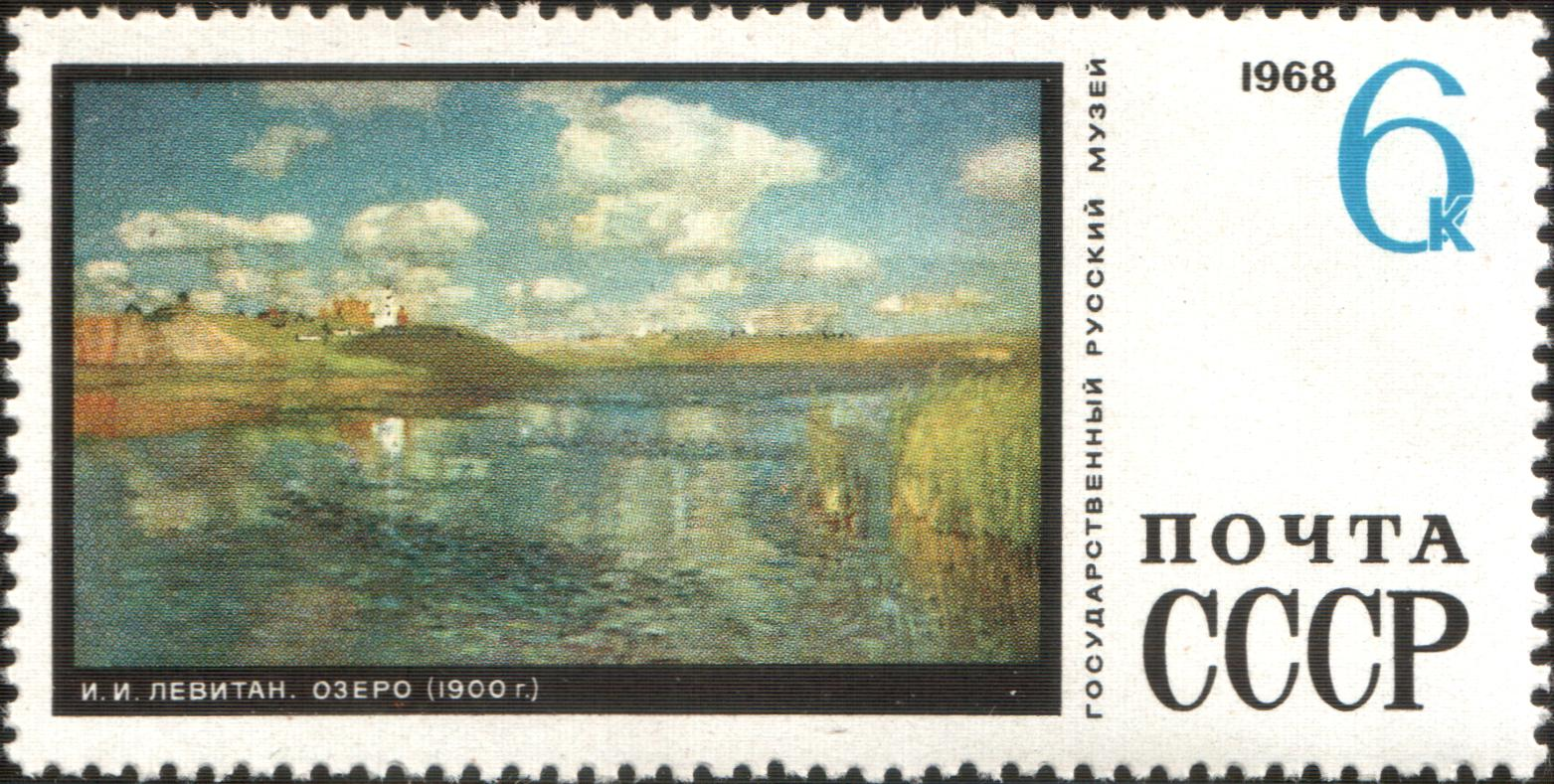
The painting Lake on a 1968 USSR postage stamp

In the early 2000s, art historian Faina Maltseva wrote that in the century since Lake was painted, it had not lost 'its high artistry and aesthetic effectiveness.' Maltseva noted that despite some pictorial incompleteness in Levitan's landscape, it 'by itself further consolidates the image created by the artist's intended second, more expansive name' (meaning the alternative name 'Rus.') According to Maltseva, 'the presence of a work with such a major mood in Levitan's oeuvre is natural,' as 'it organically blends with many of his landscapes from the last period.'

Art historian Vitaly Manin noted that 'with obvious manifestation of the artist's pictorial quest, opens the art of the new century' in Levitan's last unfinished painting Lake. Rus. According to Manin, the basis of the new method of understanding the world was 'the desire to capture the momentary state of the atmosphere, the variability of colours, the mobility of the air, and at the same time a sketchy manner of capturing feelings and experiences,' while the former scale of thinking gave way to a sensitive listening to the life of nature, the desire to capture its 'mental state'.' Noting the dynamism of the brushstroke and the extraordinary brightness of the colours, Manin wrote that Lake 'enriches the painting with the excited impressionist vibration of colour' and marks the transition from the earlier calm Levitan paintings to a lively movement.

According to the art historian Vladimir Kruglov, Lake is characterised by 'the search for an epic beginning with an almost impressionistic freshness of perception of nature and execution.' Kruglov wrote that, despite the painting being unfinished, it makes a complete impression, is one of the highlights of Levitan's work, and is rightly regarded as 'a masterpiece of domestic landscape painting.'

Artist Konstantin Yuon described Levitan's painting Lake, along with March, and Fresh Wind. Volga as works filled with 'joy and a happy sense of life.'

== Bibliography ==
- Алпатов, М.В. (1945). Левитан. Массовая библиотека (in Russian). Moscow: Искусство.
- Захаренкова, Л.И. (2010). "История персональных выставок И. И. Левитана и подготовка в Третьяковской галерее выставки, приуроченной к 150-летию со дня рождения художника" (PDF). Третьяковские чтения 2009 (in Russian). Moscow: Экспресс 24: 219–225. ISBN 978-5-89580-105-5.
- Иовлева, Л.И. (2010). "О левитановском пейзаже и юбилейной левитановской выставке" (PDF). Третьяковская галерея (in Russian) (3): 4–13.
- Круглов, В.Ф. (2001). Исаак Левитан. Золотая галерея русской живописи. Moscow: Арт-Родник. ISBN 5-88896-051-9.
- Лужецкая, А.Н. (1965). Техника масляной живописи русских мастеров с XVIII по начало XX века (in Russian). Moscow: Искусство.
- Мальцева, Ф.С. (2002). Мастера русского пейзажа. Вторая половина XIX века. Часть 4 (in Russian). Moscow: Искусство. ISBN 9785210013484.
- Манин, В.С. (2001). Русский пейзаж. Энциклопедия мирового искусства (in Russian). Moscow: Белый город. ISBN 5-7793-0293-6.
- Манин, В.С. (2012). Русская пейзажная живопись. Конец XVIII — XIX век (in Russian). Saint Petersburg: Аврора. ISBN 978-5-7300-0847-2.
- Молчанов, Б.Н. (1979). Картинная галерея им. К. А. Савицкого. Путеводитель (in Russian). Penza: Приволжское книжное издательство (Пензенское отделение).
- Петров, В.А. (1992). Исаак Ильич Левитан. Русские живописцы XIX века (in Russian). Saint Petersburg: Художник России. ISBN 5-7370-0212-8.
- Петров, В.А. (2000). Исаак Левитан (in Russian). Moscow: Белый город. ISBN 5-7793-0250-2.
- Петрунина, Л.Я. (2012). "Выставка И. И. Левитана глазами зрителей" (PDF). Третьяковские чтения 2010—2011 (in Russian). Moscow: Инико: 606–618. ISBN 978-5-89580-106-2.
- Пилипенко, В.Н. (1994). Пейзажная живопись. Русские живописцы XIX века (in Russian). Moscow: Художник России. ISBN 5-7370-0315-9.
- Пророкова, С.А. (1960). Левитан. Жизнь замечательных людей (in Russian). Moscow: Молодая гвардия.
- Прытков, В.А. (1960). Исаак Ильич Левитан. К 100-летию со дня рождения (in Russian). Moscow: Советский художник.
- Рогинская, Ф.С. (1989). Товарищество передвижных художественных выставок (in Russian). Moscow: Искусство.
- Турков, А.М. (1974). Исаак Ильич Левитан. Жизнь в искусстве (in Russian). Moscow: Искусство.
- Фёдоров-Давыдов, А.А. (1966). Исаак Ильич Левитан. Жизнь и творчество (in Russian). Moscow: Искусство.
- Фёдоров-Давыдов, А.А. (1975). "Картина И. Левитана «Озеро»". Русское и советское искусство. Статьи и очерки (in Russian). Moscow: Искусство. pp. 574–588.
- Филиппов, В.А. (2003). Импрессионизм в русской живописи (in Russian). Moscow: Белый город. ISBN 5-7793-0577-3.
- Царёва, Н.С. (2020). "Живая традиция". Культура Алтайского края (in Russian): 36–39.
- Чижмак, М.С. (2010). "Хроника жизни и творчества Исаака Левитана" (PDF). Третьяковская галерея (in Russian) (3): 58–71.
- Чурак, Г.С. (2010). ""Художник чудный и гениальный"". Наше наследие (in Russian) (95): 30–43.
- Горьковский государственный художественный музей. Leningrad: Художник РСФСР. 1986.
- Государственная Третьяковская галерея — каталог собрания. Vol. 4: Живопись второй половины XIX века, book 1, А–М. Moscow: Красная площадь. 2001. ISBN 5-900743-56-X.
- Государственный Русский музей — Живопись, XVIII — начало XX века (каталог). Leningrad: Аврора and Искусство. 1980.
- Государственный Русский музей — каталог собрания. Vol. 6: Живопись второй половины XIX века (К—М). Saint Petersburg: Palace Editions. 2016. ISBN 978-5-93332-565-9.
- Государственный Русский музей — Из истории музея. Saint Petersburg: Государственный Русский музей. 1995. ISBN 5-900872-04-1.
- Исаак Ильич Левитан. Письма, документы, воспоминания. Moscow: Искусство. 1956.
- Исаак Ильич Левитан. Каталог выставки к столетию со дня рождения (1860—1960). Moscow: Издательство Академии художеств СССР. 1960.
- Исаак Ильич Левитан. Документы, материалы, библиография. Moscow: Искусство. 1966.
- Памятники культуры. Новые открытия. Ежегодник — 2003. Moscow: Наука. 2004. ISBN 5-02-032662-3.
- Художники народов СССР. Библиографический словарь. Vol. 2 (Бойченко — Геонджиан). Moscow: Искусство. 1972.
