= Abbakumovo =

Abbakumovo (Russian: Аббакумово) is the name of several rural localities in Russia:

- Abbakumovo, Moscow Oblast, a village in Fedoskinskoye Rural Settlement of Mytishchinsky District in Moscow Oblast; 56°0′N 37°31′E
- Abbakumovo, Gagarinsky District, Smolensk Oblast, a village in Gagarinskoye Rural Settlement of Gagarinsky District in Smolensk Oblast; 55°40′20″N 34°45′27″E
- Abbakumovo, Gus-Khrustalny District, Vladimir Oblast, a village in Gus-Khrustalny District of Vladimir Oblast
- Abbakumovo, Novoduginsky District, Smolensk Oblast, a village in Tesovskoye Rural Settlement of Novoduginsky District in Smolensk Oblast; 55°28′40″N 34°20′19″E
- Abbakumovo, Petushinsky District, Vladimir Oblast, a village in Petushinsky District of Vladimir Oblast
- Abbakumovo, Tver Oblast, a village in Selishchenskoye Rural Settlement of Selizharovsky District in Tver Oblast; 56°52′06″N 33°22′58″E
- Abbakumovo, Vladimir, Vladimir Oblast, a village under the administrative jurisdiction of the City of Vladimir in Vladimir Oblast

== See also ==
- Abakumovo, several rural localities in Russia
- Abakumov, Russian last name
- Abbakumov, Russian last name
