= Abakumovo =

Abakumovo (Russian: Абакумово) is the name of several rural localities in Russia.

== Modern localities ==
- Abakumovo, Arkhangelsk Oblast, a village in Pavlovsky Selsoviet of Kargopolsky District in Arkhangelsk Oblast; 61°35′13″N 39°03′28″E
- Abakumovo, Kostroma Oblast, a village in Buyakovskoye Settlement of Susaninsky District in Kostroma Oblast; 58°11′53″N 41°21′26″E
- Abakumovo, Nizhny Novgorod Oblast, a village in Loyminsky Selsoviet of Sokolsky District in Nizhny Novgorod Oblast; 57°03′30″N 43°31′25″E
- Abakumovo, Novosibirsk Oblast, a settlement in Taskayevsky Selsvoiet of Barabinsky District of Novosibirsk Oblast; 55°11′28″N 78°38′54″E
- Abakumovo, Ryazan Oblast, a selo in Tyrnovsky Rural Okrug of Pronsky District in Ryazan Oblast; 54°15′35″N 39°35′00″E
- Abakumovo, Lesnoy District, Tver Oblast, a village in Bokhtovskoye Rural Settlement of Lesnoy District in Tver Oblast; 58°23′33″N 35°28′24″E
- Abakumovo, Rameshkovsky District, Tver Oblast, a village in Zaklinye Rural Settlement of Rameshkovsky District in Tver Oblast; 57°26′15″N 36°16′03″E
- Abakumovo, Staritsky District, Tver Oblast, a village in Staritsa Rural Settlement of Staritsky District in Tver Oblast; 56°25′49″N 34°45′22″E
- Abakumovo, Strashevichskoye Rural Settlement, Torzhoksky District, Tver Oblast, a village in Strashevichskoye Rural Settlement of Torzhoksky District in Tver Oblast; 56°51′31″N 34°32′09″E
- Abakumovo, Tredubskoye Rural Settlement, Torzhoksky District, Tver Oblast, a village in Moshkovskoye Rural Settlement of Torzhoksky District in Tver Oblast; 56°45′49″N 35°16′29″E

== Alternative names ==
- Abakumovo, alternative name of Abbakumovo, a village in Fedoskinskoye Rural Settlement of Mytishchinsky District in Moscow Oblast; 56°0′12″N 37°31′13″E

== See also ==
- Abbakumovo, several rural localities in Russia
- Abakumov, Russian last name
- Abbakumov, Russian last name
