= Bakulin =

Bakulin (Russian: Баку́лин; masculine) or Bakulina (Баку́лина; feminine) is a Russian last name.

There are two theories regarding the origins of this last name. According to the first one, it is a variety of the last name Abakumov, which is derived from a patronymic, itself derived from various forms of the Christian male first name Avvakum. However, it is also possible that this last name is related to the last name Bakunin, both of which derive from dialectal Russian words "бакуля" (bakulya) and "бакуня" (bakunya), meaning, depending on the dialect, chatterbox, talkative person or agile, business-like person.

The following people share this last name:

- Alex Bakulin, general manager of Volzhanin, a Russian bus lease holding company
- Alexey Bakulin, People's Commissar of Transport of the Soviet Union in 1937–1938
- Arkadi Bakulin, First Team Coach of FC Astana, a Kazakh association football team
- Barbara Bakulin, a member of the Polish team at the 1972 Summer Olympics Women's 4×100 meters relay
- Ivan Bakulin, several people
- Maria Bakulina, Russian center basketball player for WBC Dynamo Novosibirsk
- Natalia Bakulina, 2001 Miss International contestant from Ukraine
- Nicholas Savich Bakulin (1869–1962), Russian painter
- Nikolay Bakulin, winner of Moscow City Chess Championship in 1964 and 1966
- Sergey Bakulin (b. 1986), Russian race walker
- Vitaly Bakulin (b. 1983), Russian association football player
- Vladimir Bakulin (1939–2012), Soviet Olympic wrestler
- Yelena Bakulina, one of the victims of Soviet serial killer Andrei Chikatilo
- Yevhen Bakulin, member of the supervisory board of Ukrnafta, a Ukrainian oil and natural gas extracting company

== See also ==
- Bakulino, several rural localities in Russia
