= Vladimirka (disambiguation) =

Vladimirka is the colloquial name for the Vladimir Highway, Russia.

Vladimirka may also refer to:

- Vladimirka (painting), a painting by Isaac Levitan
- The Russian-language name of Volodymyrka, Vinnytsia Oblast, a village in Ukraine

== See also ==
- Vladimirko
