= Bakun =

Bakun may refer to:

- Bakun, Benguet, a third class municipality in Benguet Province, Philippines
- Bakun Dam, an embankment dam in East Malaysia
- Bakun, a colloquial form of the Russian male first name Avvakum
