= Ambakum =

Ambakum may refer to:

- Ambakum, a literary form of the Russian first name Avvakum
- Ambakum, Greek-based name of Book VIII in the Book of Twelve in the Bible
