= By the Pool =

Painting by Russian artist Isaac Levitan

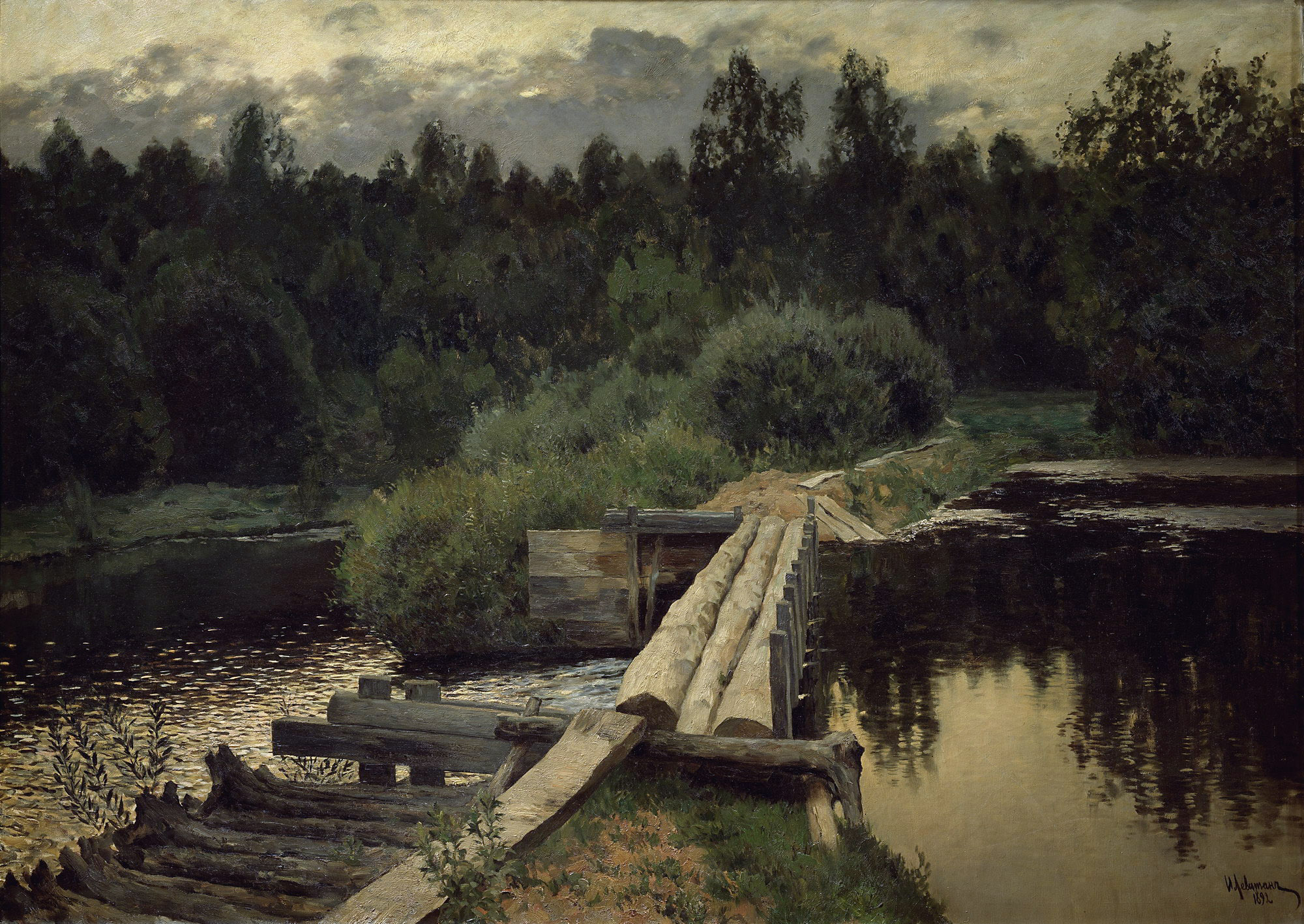
- Artist: Isaac Levitan
- Year: 1892
- Medium: Oil on canvas
- Dimensions: 150 cm × 209 cm (59 in × 82 in)
- Location: Tretyakov Gallery, Moscow

By the Pool is a landscape by the Russian artist Isaac Levitan (1860–1900), completed in 1892. It is kept in the State Tretyakov Gallery in Moscow (inventory 1484). The size is 150×209 cm (according to other sources 151.5×212 cm). The foreground of the canvas shows small bridges leading into the timbers of a dam, with a pond to the right. On the other side of the river, a narrow path leads past coastal bushes into a dark twilight forest.

Levitan began to work on the picture in 1891 in the Tver province, using as a model the natural landscape near the Tma River near the village of Bernovo. In the winter of 1891/1892 he continued to work on the painting in Moscow, and in February 1892 it was presented at the 20th Exhibition of the Association of Travelling Art Exhibitions ("Peredvizhniki"), which opened in St. Petersburg. Directly from the exhibition canvas was bought from the author by Pavel Tretyakov, in agreement with whom Levitan later finalized the image of the water surface, using sketches written by him in the summer of 1892 in the Vladimir province.

The painting By the Pool is one of the three greatest works of the artist — together with the paintings Over Eternal Peace (1894) and Lake (1899–1900) Together with two other works from the first half of the 1890s —Over Eternal Peace and Vladimirka (1892)— By the Pool is sometimes grouped into the so-called "dark" or "dramatic" trilogy of Levitan.

Art historian Aleksei Fedorov-Davydov considered the work By the Pool to be "the first experience on the way of creating a national image in the landscape", and called it "one of the outstanding canvases of itinerant landscape painting", at the same time noting that this painting "is not an undisputed success" Levitan. The art historian Grigory Sternin wrote that the size of the canvas and "a somewhat dramatized characteristic of the object and color environment" indicate that one of the author's goals was "to create an epic spectacle, not devoid of elements of fairy-tale theatricality".

== History ==
=== Previous events and work on the painting ===
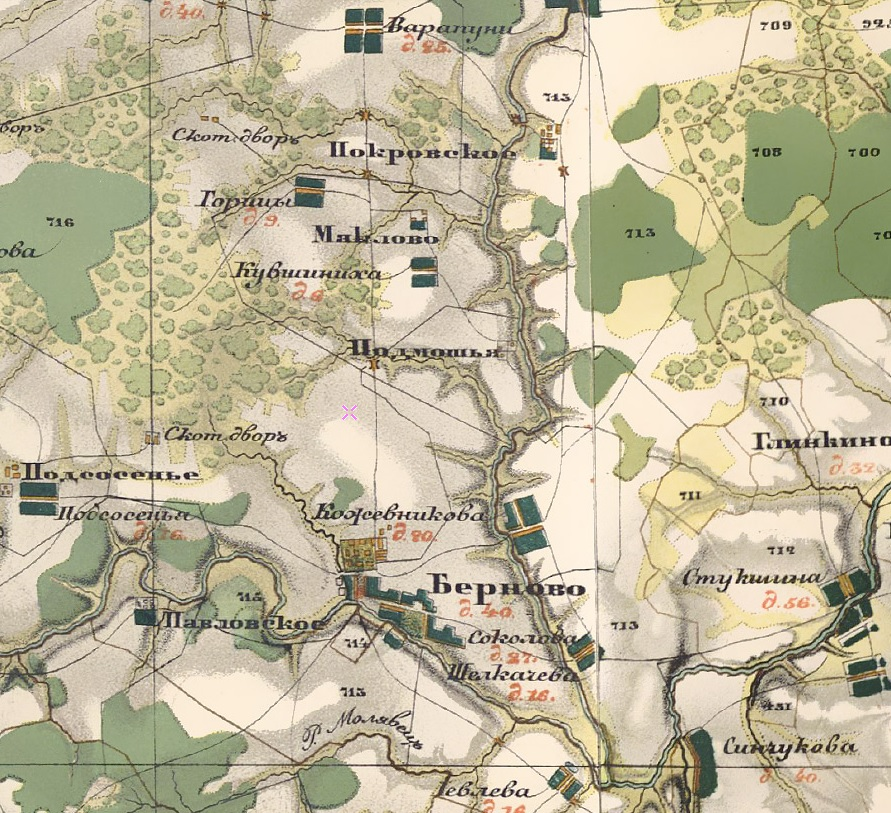
Bernovo village's neighborhood on the topographic map of 1853 (Kurovo-Pokrovskoye is marked as Pokrovskoye; from west to east the river Tma flows through Bernovo; from north to south the river Nashiga flows through Pokrovskoye).

The painting By the Pool was conceived and begun in 1891, when Isaac Levitan lived in the village of Zatishye, Staritsky uyezd, Tver province (now on the territory of Staritsky district, Tver region). He was accompanied by the artist Sofia Kuvshinnikova, and they were invited to spend the summer in the Tver region by Lika Mizinova, whom Levitan knew well as a close friend of Maria Pavlovna, the sister of Anton Pavlovich Chekhov.

Levitan and Kuvshinnikova arrived in these regions in May. In a letter to Anton Chekhov dated May 29, 1891, (Note: To date events that took place in the Russian Empire, the Julian calendar ("old style") is used.) the artist wrote: "I am writing to you from that charming corner of the earth, where everything, from the air and the end, God forgive me, the last anything on earth is imbued with it, it — the divine Lika!" In the same letter Levitan reported that he had settled close to the estate of Nikolai Pavlovich Panafidina (Lika Mizinova's uncle), and wrote that he had not quite succeeded in choosing the place: "On my first visit here I thought everything seemed very nice here, and now quite the opposite, I go and wonder how I could like it all". In June, Levitan's mood improved, and he wrote to Chekhov: "With the change of weather here has become more interesting, appeared quite interesting motifs".

Not far from Zatishya, in the village of Bernovo, near the Tma River, was the estate of Anna Nikolayevna Wulf, who inherited it from her father, Nikolai Ivanovich Wulf, who died in 1889. Levitan liked the landscape of a pond near an old ruined mill and began to make a pencil sketch. When the landlady saw what he was drawing, she told him a legend that supposedly inspired Alexander Pushkin to write the drama Rusalka.

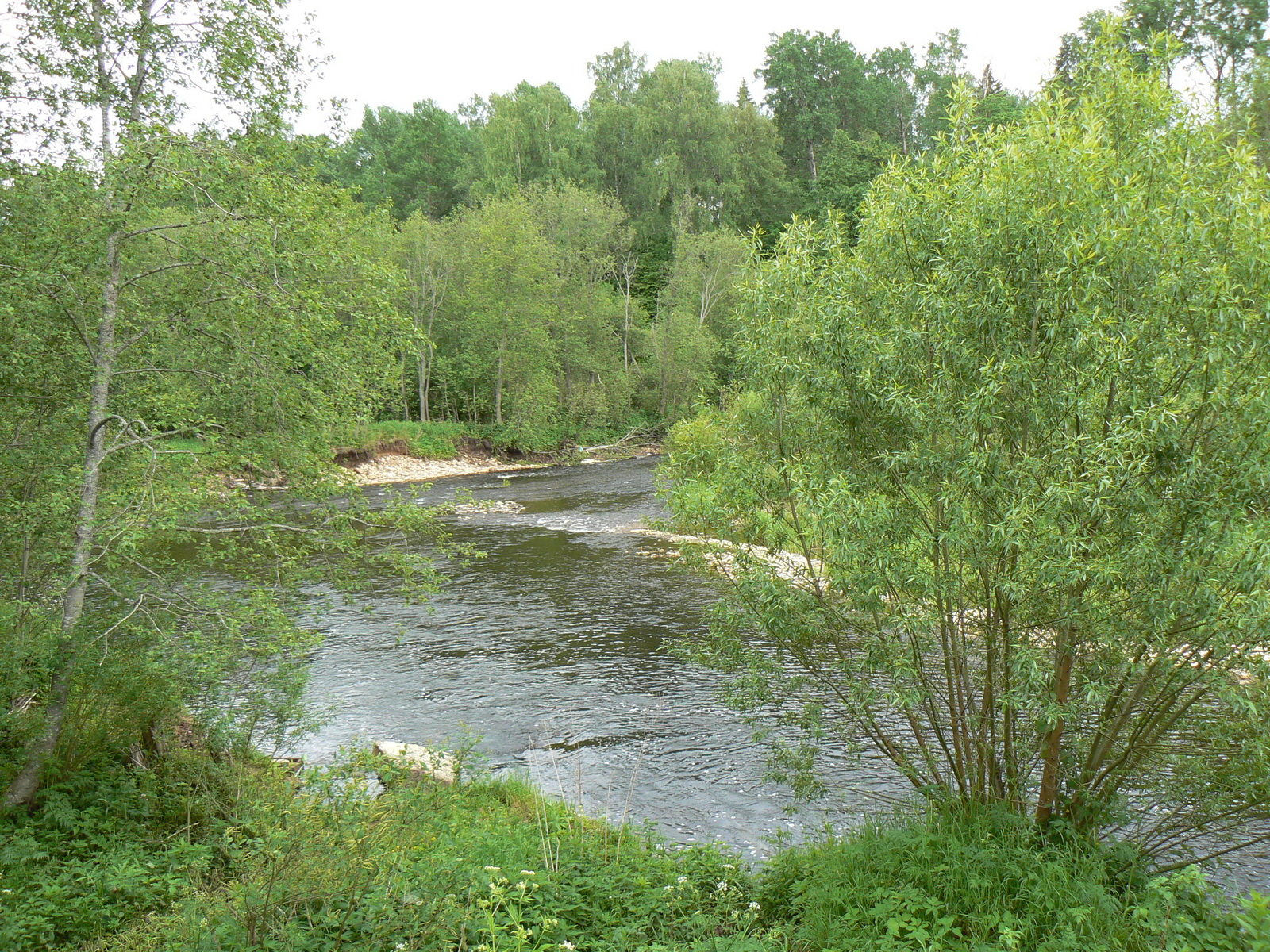
Levitan worked on the painting By the Pool on the bank of the Tma River in the village of Bernovo

The story was connected with the time when Anna Nikolayevna's grandfather, Ivan Ivanovich Wolf, was the owner of Bernov. The descriptions of this legend differ somewhat from one author to another. According to one source, Ivan Ivanovich, despite the fact that he was married and had five children, chose peasant girls for his entertainment. One of the young peasant girls, who had been looking for a barin, fell in love with his maid and engaged her. When Ivan Ivanovich found out, he was furious and ordered his servant to be recruited. Knowing that after that nothing would save her from the tavern's harassment, the girl drowned herself in a pool. In another version, the servant was not a valet, but a stable boy, and the girl's name was Natasha, the daughter of a miller. The young people fell in love, and Natasha got pregnant. When word of their secret love reached the Wolf, the stable boy was beaten to a pulp and then given to the soldiers, and his beloved drowned herself in grief.

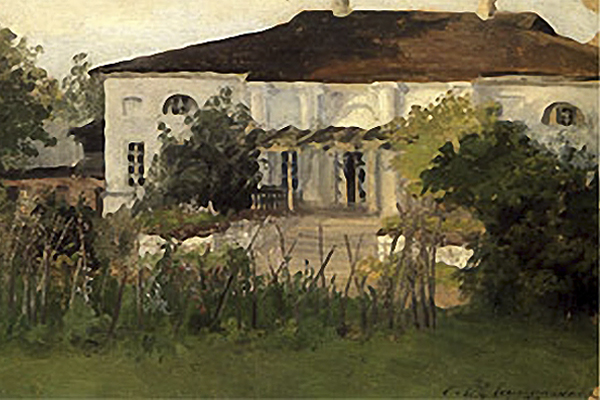
S. P. Kuvshinnikova. House in Kurovo-Pokrovsky (1891, TOKG)

The story of Anna Nikolayevna Wulf greatly excited Levitan. With a feeling of anxiety he went near the dam and returned there the next day. Gradually he came up with the idea of painting a picture. Sophia Kuvshinnikova recalled: "After making a small sketch, Levitan decided to write a large study from nature, and for a week in the morning we sat in the car —Levitan on the goats, I in the back seat— and drove the study, like an icon, to the mill, and then the same way back. Then, when I left for Moscow, Panafidiny offered Levitan to move to them, in Pokrovskoye, and here, in the large hall assigned to him for the workshop, he wrote his picture".

In fact, after Kuvshinnikova left for Moscow in August, Levitan moved to Kurovo-Pokrovskoye, an estate owned by Nikolai Pavlovich Panafidin and his wife Serafima Alexandrovna. The main house of the estate is depicted in Sofia Kuvshinnikova's sketch The House in Kurovo-Pokrovskoye (1891), kept in the Tver Regional Picture Gallery. The owners provided Levitan with a spacious dining room with five windows for his work. Kuvshinnikova described the artist's stay at the Panafidinyh estate as follows: "For Levitan cared and looked after the whole house, which came together more than twenty people relatives. Everyone arranged their time according to Levitan's occupations". In gratitude for the hospitality of the same autumn, Levitan painted a portrait of Nikolai Panafidin (now in the Tver Regional Art Gallery), depicting the owner of the house sitting in an armchair. Researchers of Levitan's work believe that in the estate Panafidinyh artist wrote one of the sketches for the painting By the Pool, and the main canvas was created by him in the winter of 1891/1892 in Moscow.

=== 20th Travelling Exhibition and next events ===
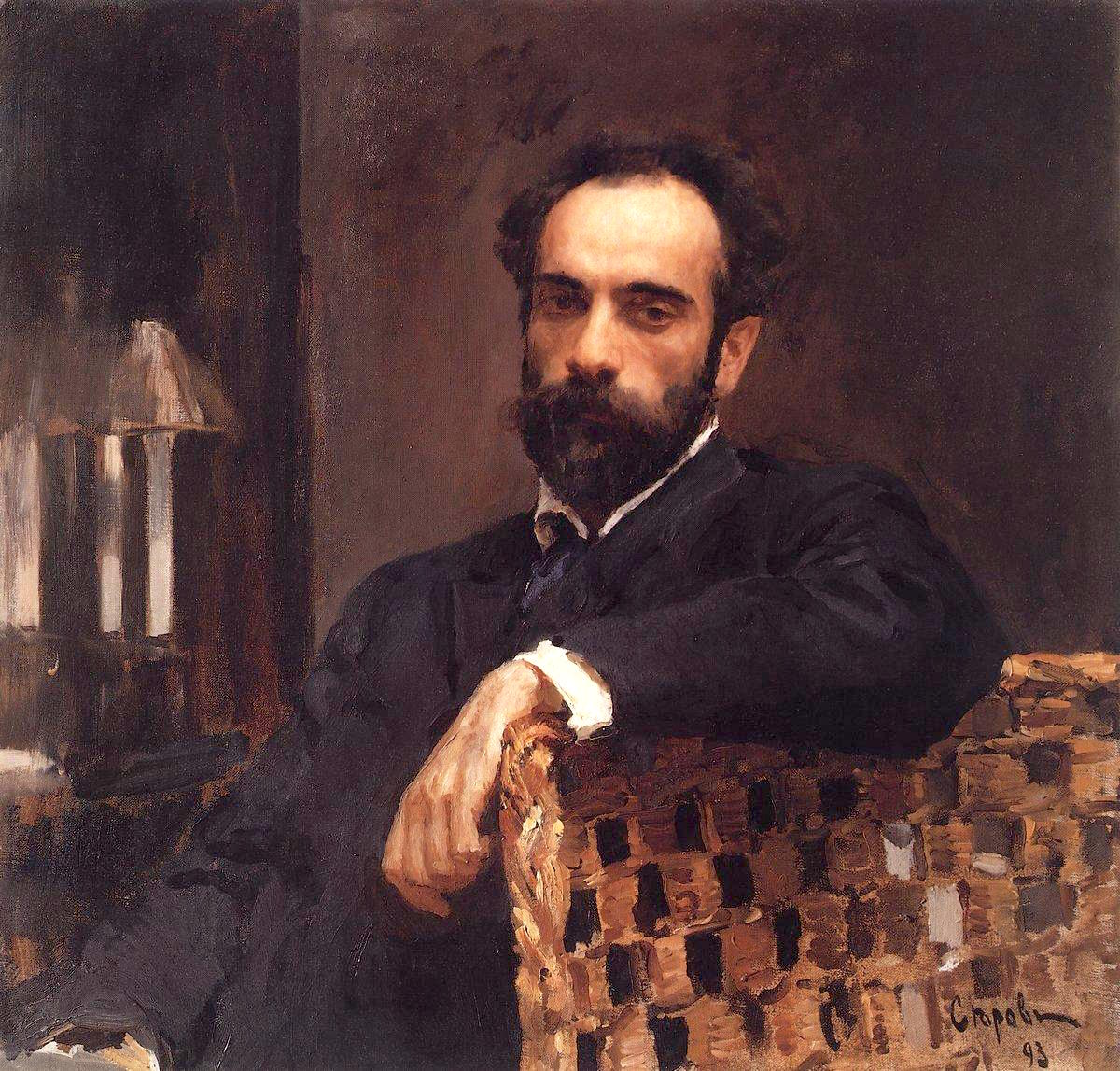
V. A. Serov. Portrait of I. I. Levitan (1893, State Tretyakov Gallery)

In early 1892, the painting By the Pool was completed. It was exhibited at the 20th exhibition of the Society of Travelling Art Exhibitions, which opened in St. Petersburg on February 23, 1892, and moved to Moscow in April of the same year. The St. Petersburg part of the exhibition was held in the building of the Imperial St. Petersburg Academy of Sciences, and the Moscow part in the premises of the Moscow School of Painting, Sculpture and Architecture. The exhibition also included other works by Levitan — October (1891, now in the Samara Regional Art Museum), as well as Autumn and Summer (location unknown). However, "the most important and significant" of the works exhibited by Levitan at this exhibition was the painting By the Pool. The canvas immediately attracted attention. Landscape painter Alexander Kiselyov in a letter to the painter Grigory Yartsev reported that "Levitan is just a miracle how strong in the new painting By the Pool". On the other hand, Ilya Repin wrote to Pavel Tretyakov that "Levitan's big thing" he did not like — "for its size is not made at all", "in general it is not bad, but nothing else".

A number of publications appeared in the Moscow and St. Petersburg press discussing the painting By the Pool. In general, the reactions were much less than to A Quiet Monastery, exhibited a year earlier (at the 19th traveling exhibition), and the general tone of the comments was more restrained, and among them there were even disapproving. The anonymous author of the article "Exhibition of Paintings by Wandering Artists", published in the Peterburgskaya Gazetar (№ 53, February 24, 1892), discussing the "very strong work" Brush Isaac Levitan's By the Pool, wrote that the canvas, which depicts directly from nature "ruined mill in a wooded area", "at a certain distance <...> positively captivates the viewer with its truthfulness". In the newspaper Moskovskie Vedomosti (№ 105, April 17, 1892), the historian and publicist Vladimir Gringmut noted that the painting By the Pool was technically better than other works by Levitan presented at the exhibition, because "the trunks and water are very natural, but the greenery in the background is not painted, but painted on". In an article published in the newspaper Novosti Dnya (No. 3187, May 8, 1892), the writer and critic Nikolai Alexandrov wrote that the painting By the Pool is a "purely professorial work" — in his opinion, "it is broad, freely written; it is full of harmony in the tones; but it does not touch the viewer; it, like a sketch, gives only a hint of the motif, but does not act on our souls in an exciting and irresistible way, as nature itself acts and as necessarily artistic creativity must act".

Pavel Tretyakov bought the painting from the author for three thousand rubles in 1892, directly after the exhibition. Soon after, he asked the artist to work on the image of water in the foreground — perhaps one of the reasons was Repin's not entirely favorable review. In a letter to Tretyakov dated May 13, 1892, Levitan wrote "Your request and my own consciousness to correct the water in my By the Pool, do not think that I have forgotten it. I did not dare to rewrite it until I had checked this motif with nature. Now I will write some water motifs and at the end of May I will come to Moscow and begin to rework the picture".

The art historian Alexei Fedorov-Davydov suggested that it was during this revision of the painting that Levitan dated it to 1892, since the version presented at the traveling exhibition in February was most likely completed in late 1891. Moreover, the presence of sketches depicting water, which Levitan used to finalize the canvas, led to controversy about the actual location of the place depicted in the painting.

Writer and art historian Vladimir Prytkov, author of a biography of the artist, reported that these later studies were painted by Levitan in the summer of 1892 in Vladimir Governorate, when he was living at the Gorodok estate, located near the Boldino Moscow-Nizhegorodskaya railway station. According to the testimony of local historian Nikolai Solovyov, Levitan wrote these sketches near the Lipnya River (apparently meaning Bolshaya Lipnya), near the village of Abbakumovo (now within the town of Kosteryovo). Based on these details, Prytkov came to the conclusion that, like Levitan's earlier painting A Quiet Monastery, the painting By the Pool can be considered a "synthetic landscape", containing a combination of the artist's impressions of different places. Alexei Fedorov-Davydov disagreed with this conclusion, believing that these sketches, made elsewhere, were used by Levitan only to refine the image of the water, which "did not change the nature of the image of the landscape, which is nothing but in a certain sense interpreted by the artist, but still nature".

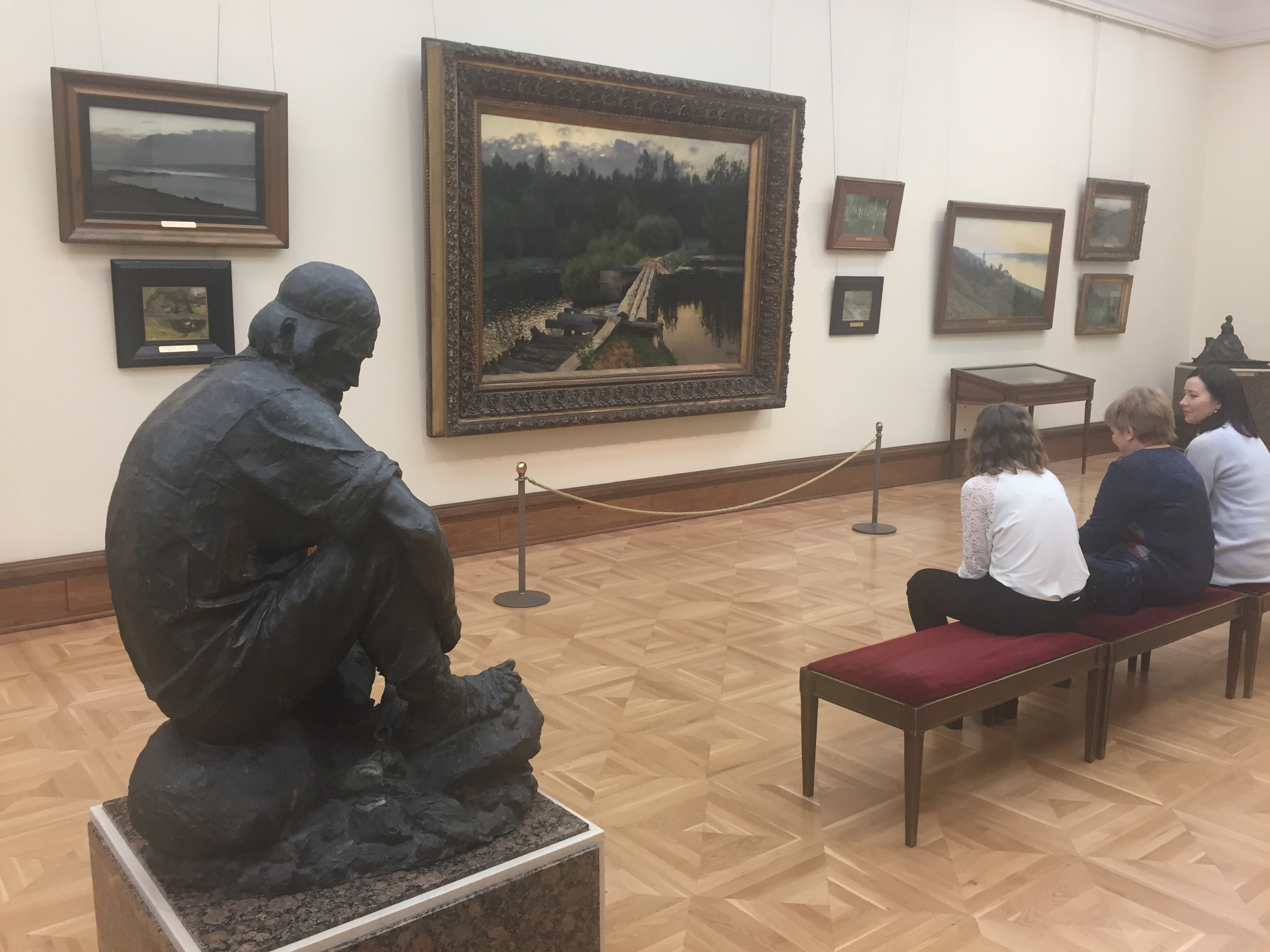
The painting By the Pool in the Levitan Hall of the State Tretyakov Gallery

At the end of August 1892 the 20th Travelling exhibition continued its journey to other cities of the Russian Empire, which ended at the end of February 1893. During this time the exhibition visited Kharkiv (August–September), Poltava (October), Elisavetgrad (November), Odessa (November–December), Kishinev (December–January) and Kyiv (January–February). Reviewers of a number of publications published in these cities criticized the painting By the Pool. The author of an article in the Odessa newspaper Novorossiyskiy Telegraph (№ 5636 of December 6, 1892) wrote: "The picture of Mr. Levitan's painting By the Pool stabs the eyes with three timbers of the dam; these timbers hit the eyes so hard that one can't see anything except them". A reviewer of the Kiev newspaper Kiyevlyanin (№ 48, February 17, 1893), writing under the pseudonym "Dilettante", admitted that "the mouth itself is depicted very truthfully", but noted that "the pursuit of "impression" and here served the artist badly, forcing him to draw in the background unnaturally gloomy and rough thicket, and above the same clouds to exacerbate the same gloomy color".

Subsequently, the painting By the Pool was exhibited at a number of exhibitions, including Levitan's personal exhibitions, held in 1938 at the State Tretyakov Gallery and in 1939 at the State Russian Museum in Leningrad, as well as at the jubilee exhibition dedicated to the 100th anniversary of the artist's birth, held in 1960-1961 in Moscow, Leningrad and Kiev (the painting participated only in the Moscow and Leningrad parts of the exhibition). In 1971–1972, the painting took part in the exhibition "Landscape Painting of the Peredvizhniks", held in Kiev, Leningrad, Minsk and Moscow (it was exhibited only in Moscow) on the occasion of the 100th anniversary of the Peredvizhniki Society. It was also among the exhibits of the commemorative exhibitions of the 150th anniversary of Levitan's birth, held in the Benois Building of the State Russian Museum (from April to July 2010) and in the New Tretyakovka in Krymsky Val (from October 2010 to March 2011).

During the jubilee exhibition of Levitan held in Moscow in 2010-2011, an opinion poll was conducted among the visitors of the exhibition. According to the results of this survey, the painting By the Pool was the first among the most popular works of the artist, ahead of the paintings Over Eternal Peace (1894, State Tretyakov Gallery) and March (1895, State Tretyakov Gallery).

== Description ==
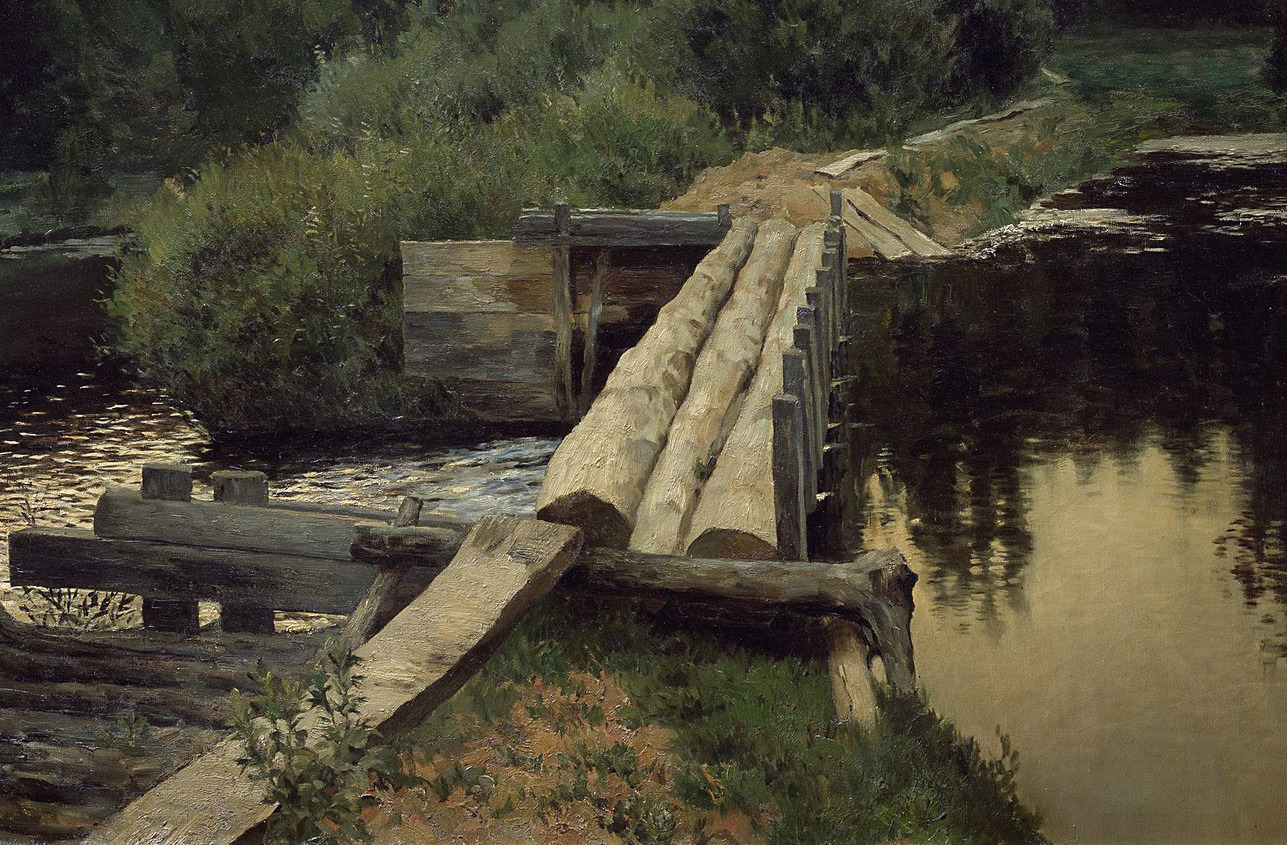
A dam and a bridge (painting's fragment)

In the foreground of the painting are small bridges over the timbers of a dam, with a pool to the right. Beyond the dam, on the other side of the river, is a narrow path that winds around the shoreline bushes and leads into a dark forest. The continuous line of the bridges, the dam, and the path that continues beyond them is the core of the composition, emphasizing the depth of the landscape, as if inviting the viewer's eye to follow and penetrate into the thicket of the twilight forest. According to literary scholar Gregory Byaly, "it seems that the old bridges, slippery, rotten, unreliable, and dangerous, lure one into the damp, mysterious depths of the forest".

Despite the fact that the river is not wide, "crossing" this space is not an easy task. The twilight and the silence that hangs over the "ruined place" evoke a sense of anxiety and discomfort, a sense of "dramatic unresolvedness" and even a sense of danger that comes along with the desire to rush into this "threatening space. The mood of the painting "seems to be inspired by village stories about mystical creatures as leshies and vodyanoys, the omut is a ruinous place to beware of". According to Alexei Fedorov-Davydov, "everything in this landscape is unsettling and tense: and the darkening green of the trees and bushes and the yellow water in the light of the sunset, different but equally dramatic, and in the standing mirror on the right and in the disturbing waves on the left".

A significant role in achieving the emotional expressiveness of the canvas plays its coloring. While painting the picture, Levitan masterfully solved the difficult problem of "coloristic association in a whole deaf green colors of trees, gray-violet clouds and yellow tones of the sky, reflections in the water, boards and timbers of the dam. The artist managed to connect the color of the logs in the foreground with the color of the clouds, while the color of the dam boards appeared as a transitional color between the color of the sky and its reflection in the water.

The oil painting technique used by Levitan to create this painting is characterized by great complexity and variety. Massive brushstrokes of the sky, bushes, logs, and the glow of the water's ripples contrast with the delicate writing of the rest of the canvas. In some places, the texture of the canvas shines through, and in others, light penmanship can be seen on its knolls.

== Sketches and studies ==
The State Tretyakov Gallery has a sketch of the same name for the painting By the Pool (gray paper or cardboard, graphite pencil, 32×48 cm, inv. 2651). Another sketch of the same name is in a private collection (paper, watercolor, ink, sepia, 16×27 cm).

In addition, the State Tretyakov Gallery has a sketch of the same name for the painting By the Pool (cardboard, oil, 25.3×33 cm, inv. Zh-1062). Until 1910, it was in the collection of the artist and collector N. V. Chelishchev, and then — at the Moscow collector G. M. Golkovsky, who donated it to the Tretyakov Gallery in 1985.

Another sketch of the same name is in a private collection (canvas, oil, 59×90 cm). Apparently, this is the same sketch that was in the collection of E. V. Lyapunova and exhibited in the exhibition. V. Lyapunova and exhibited at the 1960-1961 exhibition dedicated to the 100th anniversary of the artist.

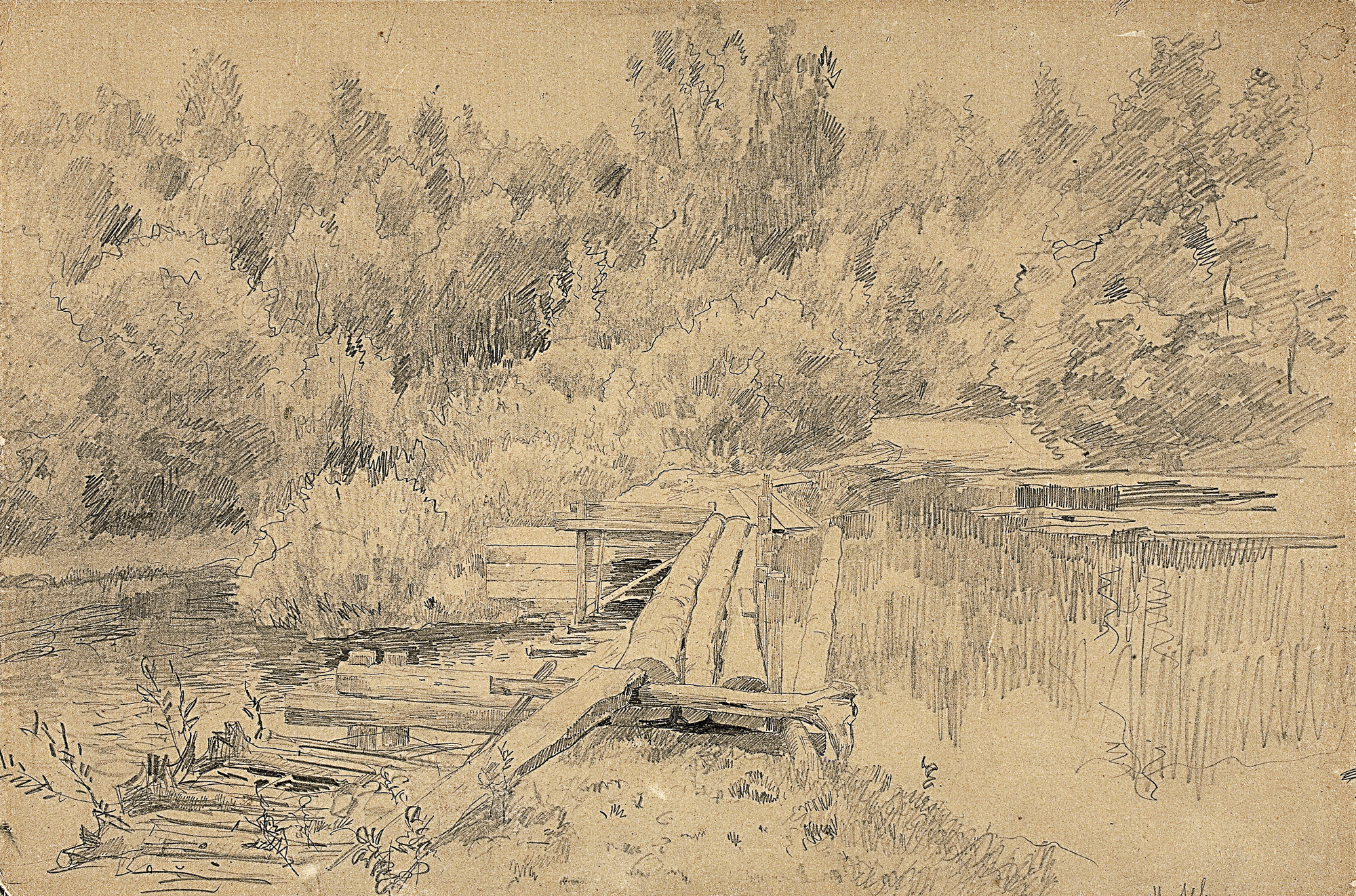
By the Pool (sketch, 1891, cardboard, pencil, State Tretyakov Gallery)

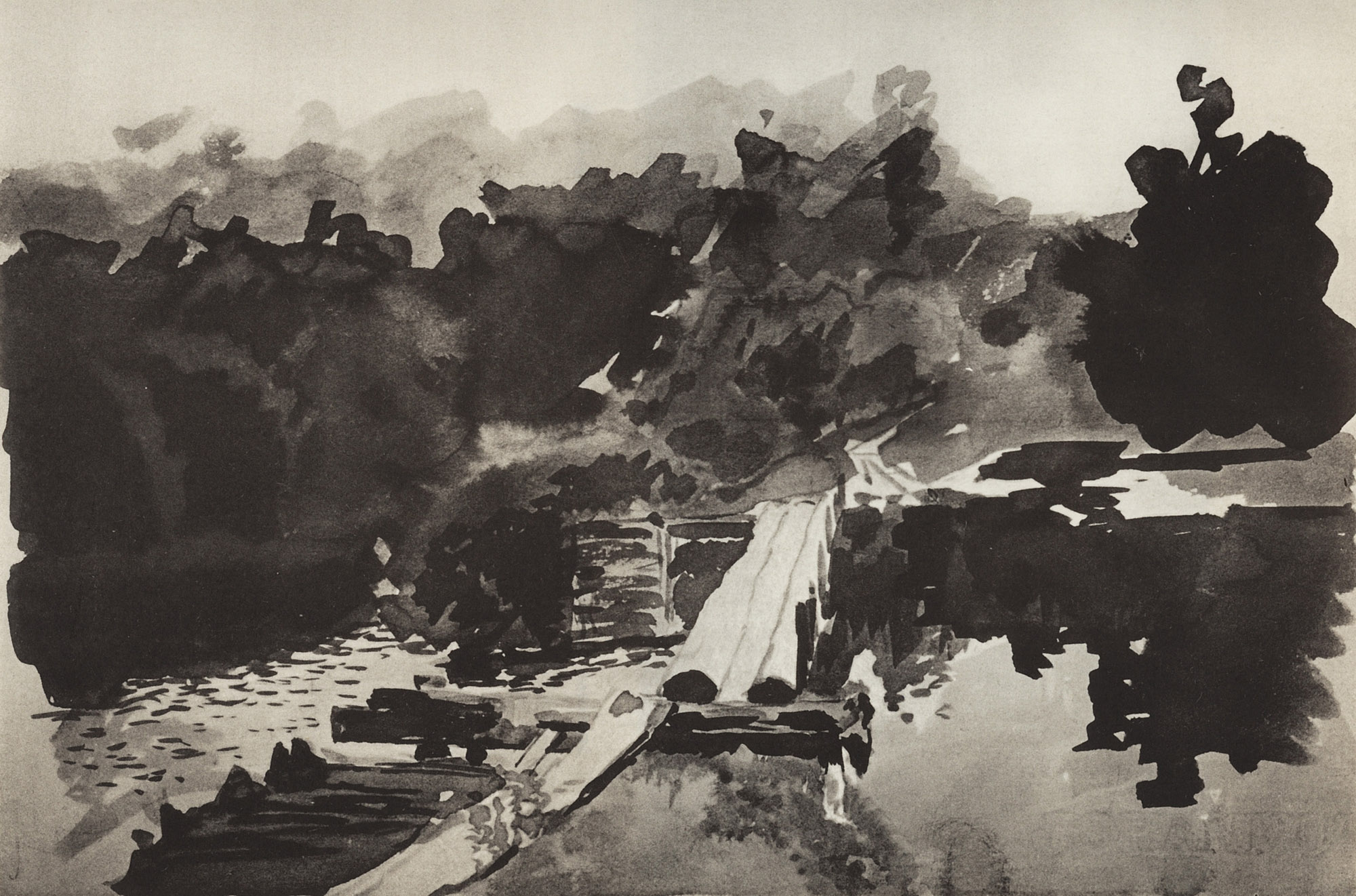
By the Pool (sketch, 1891, paper, watercolor, ink, sepia, private collection)

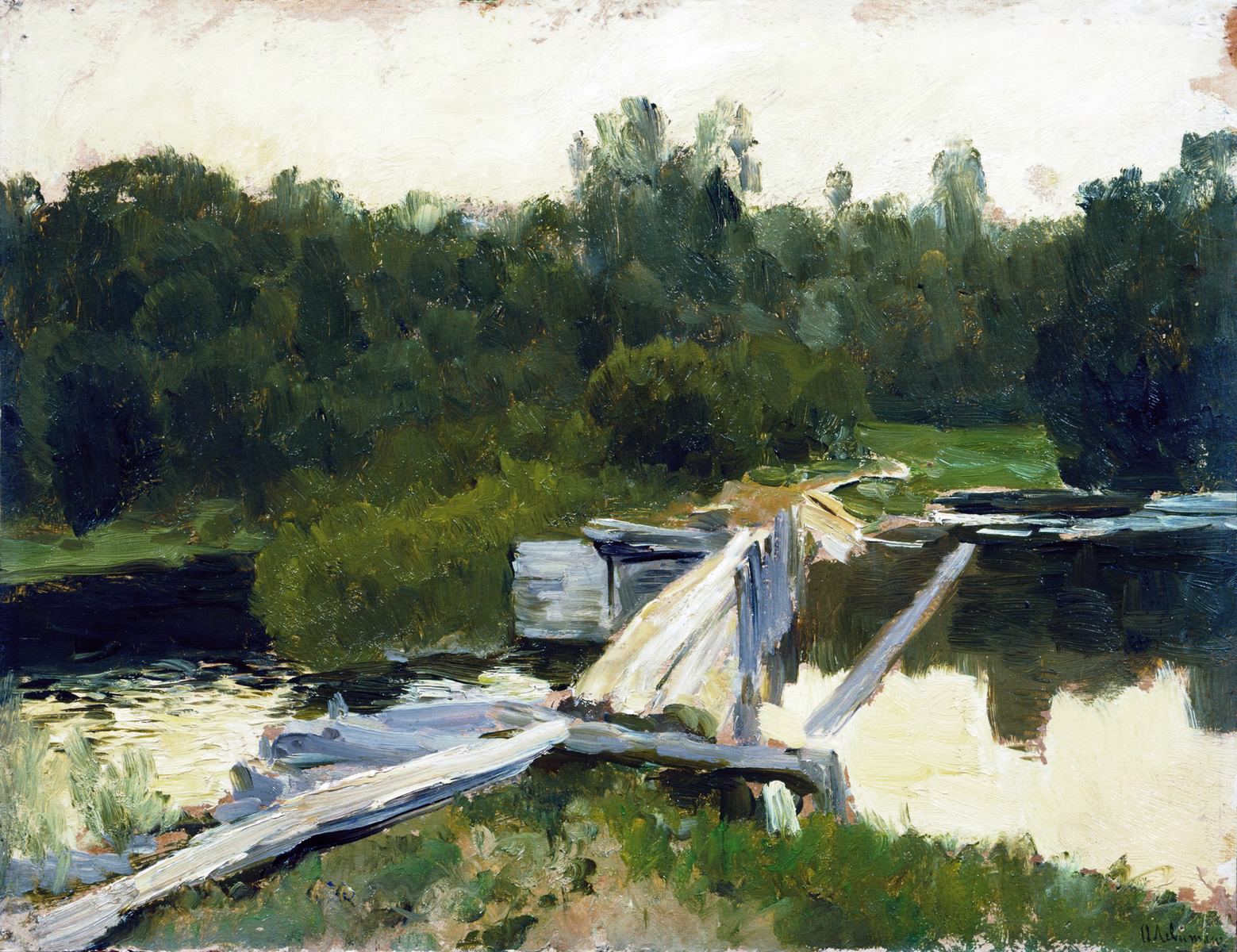
By the Pool (sketch, 1891, cardboard, oil, State Tretyakov Gallery)

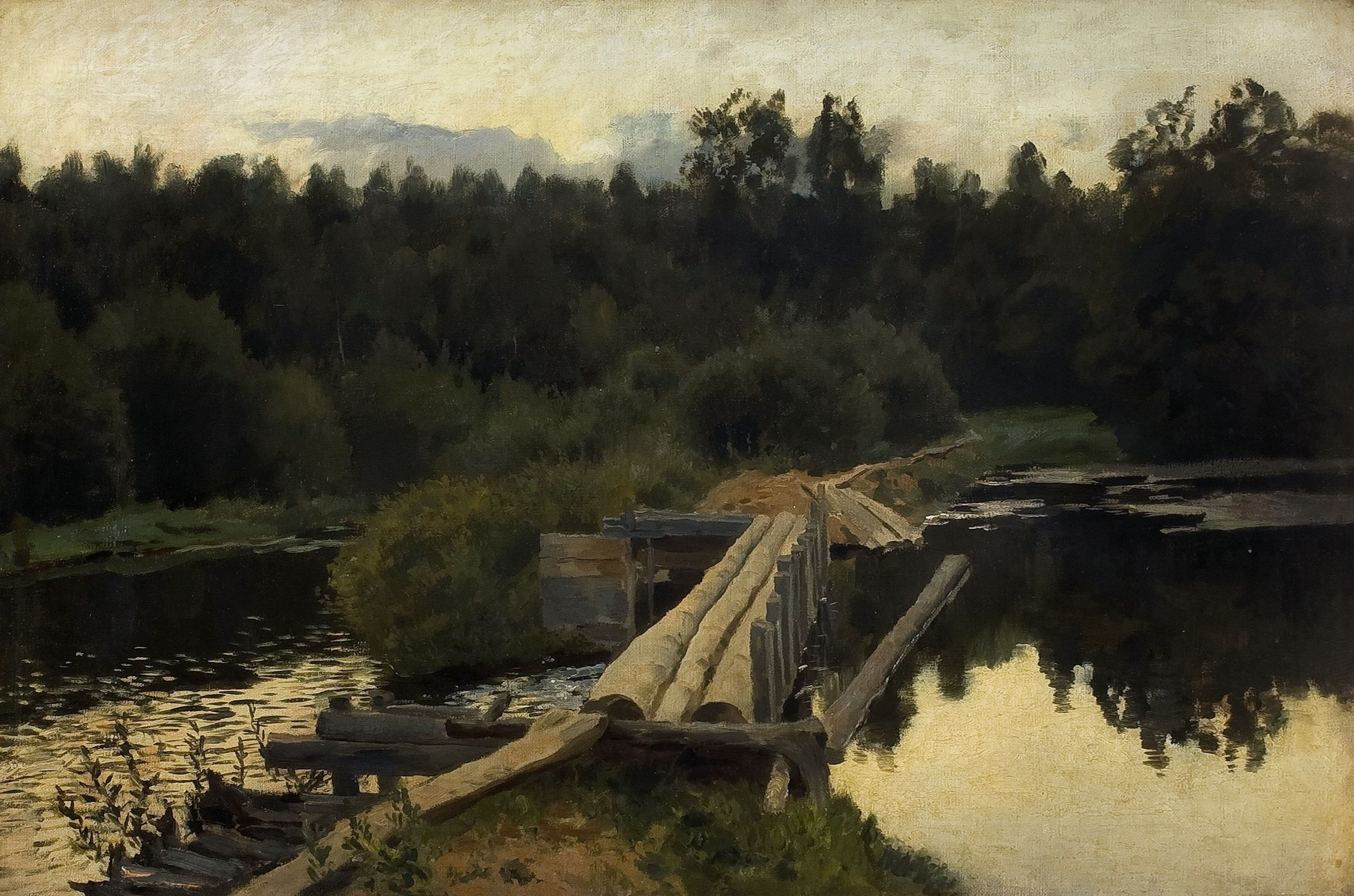
By the Pool (sketch, 1891, canvas, oil, private collection)

== Reviews and critics ==
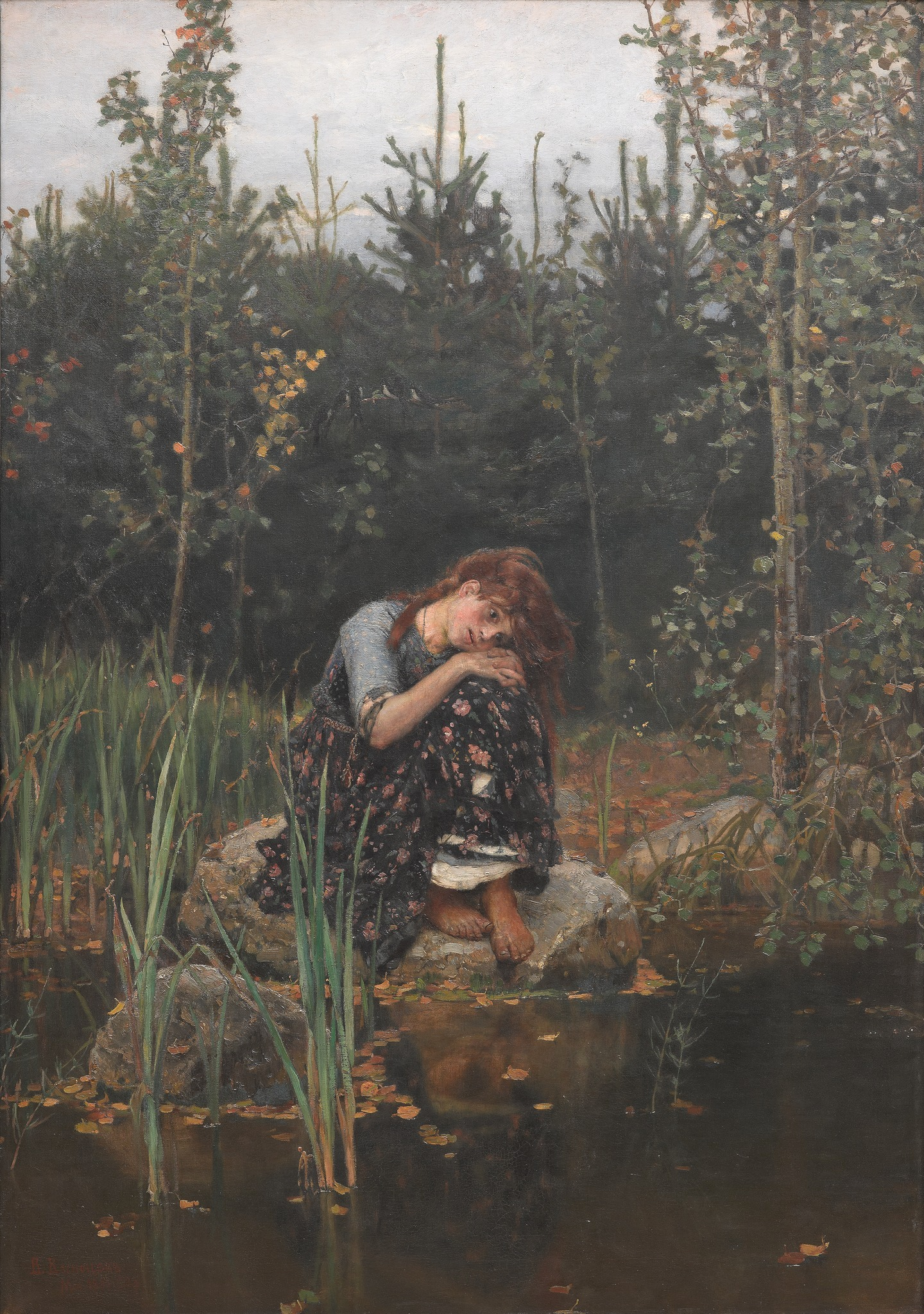
Viktor Vasnetsov. Alyonushka (1881, Tratyakov Gallery)

The artist Mikhail Nesterov in January 1892 described the "large, with a frame four arshins large" painting By the Pool: "The impression is enormous. An anxious feeling surrounds the whole and keeps the viewer in a state of constant tension. Nothing like this has appeared in the landscape since the time of Kuindzhi". Later, in his book Old Days, Nesterov recalled that he loved Levitan's Pool "as something experienced by the author and embodied in the real forms of a dramatic landscape".

Art historian Aleksei Fedorov-Davydov considered the painting By the Pool to be "the first experience on the way of creating a national image in the landscape", in which the artist tried to paint an image of nature associated with the emotional content of folk tales and legends, in the spirit of Viktor Vasnetsov's paintings. Fedorov-Davydov further wrote: "This painting is an objectively significant and meaningful work. It is undoubtedly one of the outstanding pictures of traveling landscape painting. Interesting and significant it and for the search for Levitan himself. At the same time, he noted that this picture "is not an undeniable success" and cannot be counted among Levitan's best works, because it "does not have that organicity, that "single breath," that direct poetry of its complete fusion with the very picturesque flesh of the picture," which is inherent in the artist's best paintings.

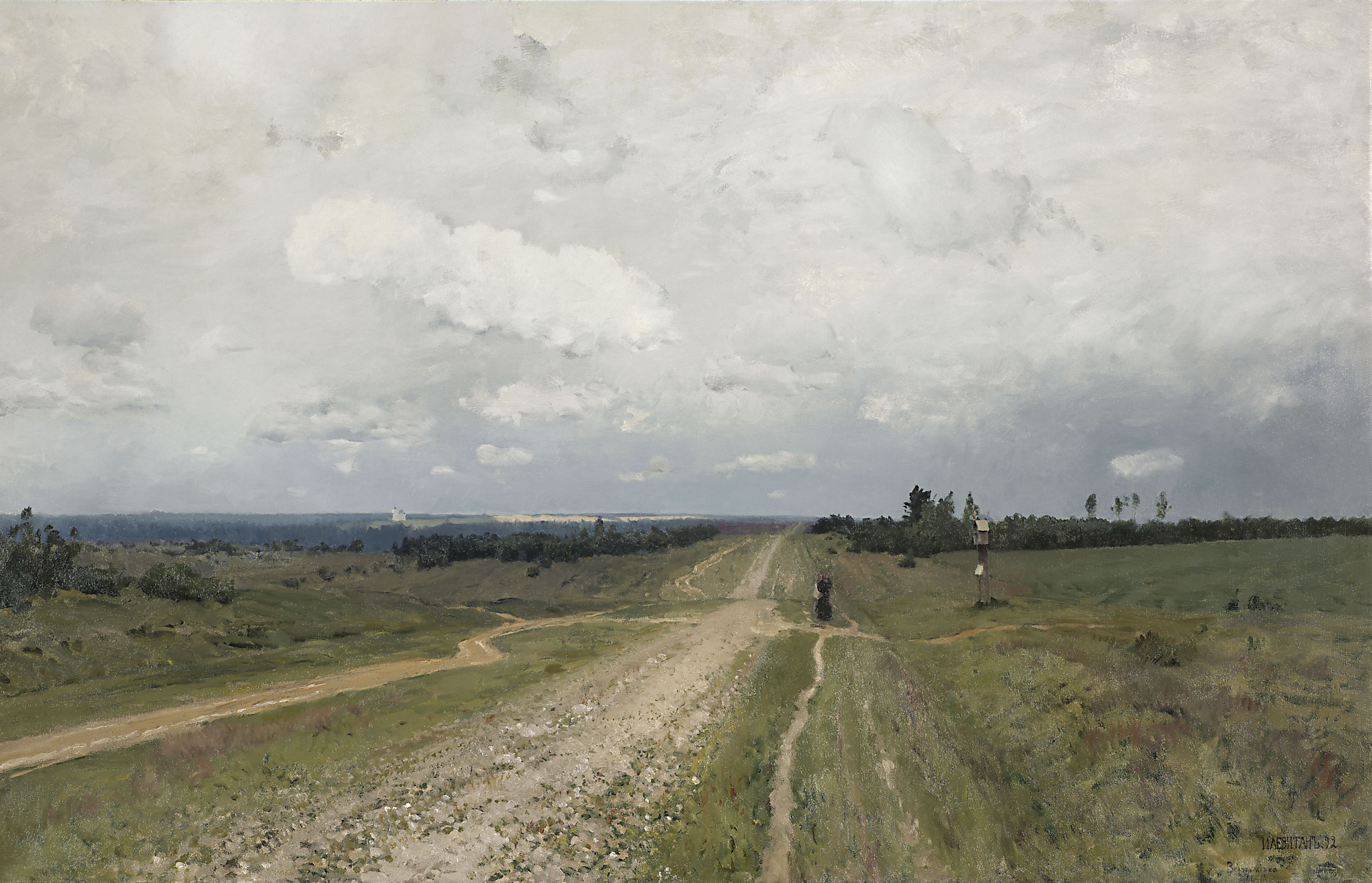
I. I. Levitan. Vladimirka (1892, State Tretyakov Gallery)

Art historian Faina Maltseva noted that in such Levitan landscapes as By the Pool, Vladimirka, and Over Eternal Peace, the "oppressive environment of social life" is reflected and the "gloomy story of Russian reality" is sounded. Talking about the painting By the Pool, Maltseva wrote that this landscape is written by Levitan "with exceptional skill in generalization", as in it the impressions caused by the motif of nature are closely intertwined with the impressions of the surrounding life. According to Maltseva, "the depth and significance of the theme taken up by the artist found its full expression in the landscape".

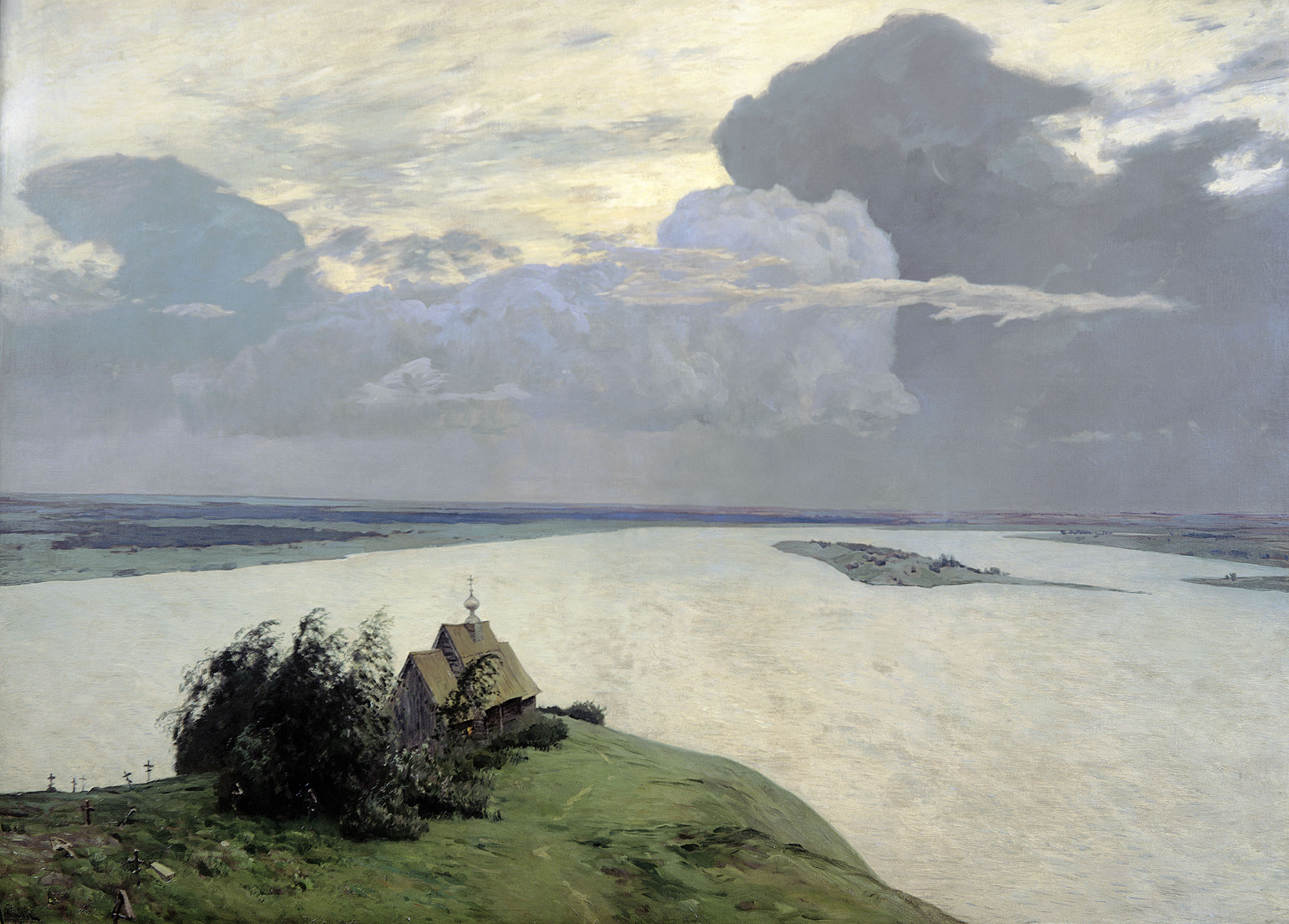
I. I. Levitan. Over Eternal Peace (1894, State Tretyakov Gallery)

Art historian Olga Lyaskovskaya, in her book "En plein air painting in Russian Painting of the 19th Century", wrote that in the composition of By the Pool the wooden beams of the dam play a very important role, facing the viewer and drawing him into the depths of the landscape. Acknowledging that "the painting is good for its gloomy mood", Lyaskovskaya nevertheless noted that, in her opinion, that painting could not be counted among "the best works of the artist", especially because of the monotony of the color scheme with the predominance of golden tones.

According to art historian Mikhail Alpatov, the extraordinary uniqueness of the painting By the Pool is achieved by "combining the bleak uncertainty of the landscape with the swiftly dragging movement" along the timbers of the dilapidated dam. According to Alpatov, in the very construction of this landscape "there is something oppressive, imperiously calling to the underdrawing, destroying the weak man's maelstrom", and Levitanovsky's canvas makes no less an impression than Viktor Vasnetsov's painting Alyonushka (1881, State Tretyakov Gallery), in which a similar mood is expressed in the figure of the girl.

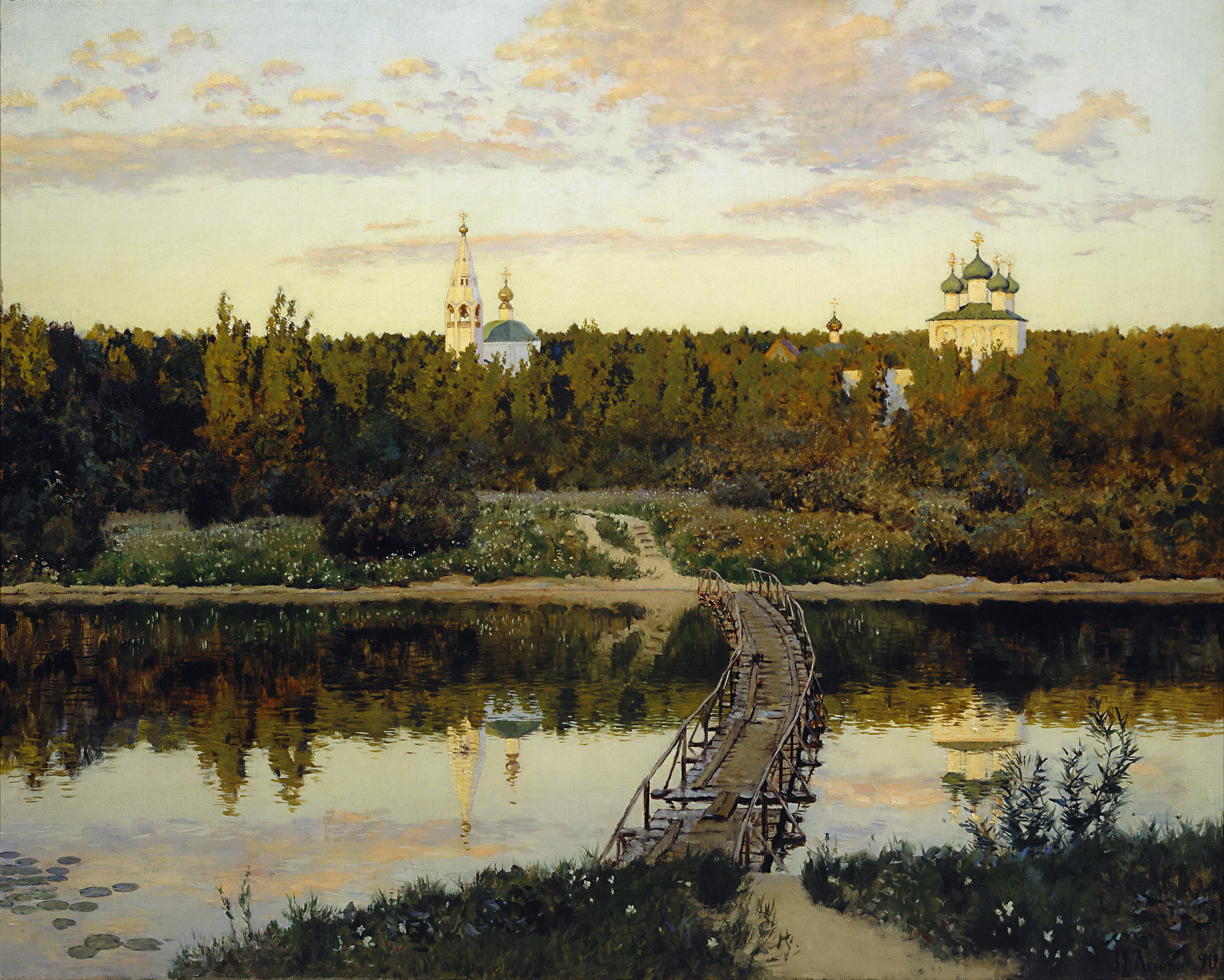
I. I. Levitan. A Quiet Monastery (1890, State Tretyakov Gallery)

According to the art historian Vladimir Petrov, the painting By the Pool was "the first in a series of large-scale works in which Levitan appeared as a profound "dramatist" of the Russian landscape". At the same time, he agreed with Nesterov that the overall tonality of the picture reflects the drama of the artist's inner life. Petrov wrote that in its composition and "power lines" the painting By the Pool is very close to the painting A Silent Monastery from 1890: in both cases the observer's eye goes over the bridge over the river, behind which one can see the path leading into the forest. At the same time, however, these paintings evoke completely different experiences — in contrast to the calm serenity of A Quiet Monastery, the work By the Pool evokes feelings of anxiety and danger, so that these two paintings can be considered "a kind of antinomian pair.

Art historian Grigory Sternin wrote that Levitan's painting By the Pool is not inferior to his Vladimirka in the semantic capacity of the poetic image, although it does not lend itself to the same straightforward ideological interpretation. According to Sternin, the main thing is that in the painting By the Pool "the motif of the landscape itself has an accentuated iconicity" because it "has more of organic existence and, above all, of the eternal mysteries of nature itself". Sternin noted that in the painting By the Pool Levitan "tends to a monumental-declamatory intonation," and the size of the canvas and "a somewhat dramatized character of the subject-color environment" indicate that one of the author's goals was "to create an epic spectacle, not without elements of fairy-tale theatricality.

== Bibliography ==
- Алпатов М. В. (1945). Левитан. Массовая библиотека (in Russian). Искусство. p. 32.
- Богемская К. Г. (1992). Пейзаж настроения у Левитана (in Russian). Галактика. pp. 234―239. ISBN 5-269-00053-9.
- Бойцова Т. И., Железнова М. М. (1986). Край вдохновения (in Russian). Калинин: Московский рабочий (Калининское отделение).
- Бялый Г. А. (1976). Очерки истории русской культуры второй половины XIX века. М.: Просвещение. p. 432.
- Дружинин С. Н. (1987). О русской и советской живописи (in Russian). Leningrad: Художник РСФСР. p. 232.
- Круглов В. Ф. (2001). Исаак Левитан. Золотая галерея русской живописи (in Russian). М.: Арт-Родник. p. 50. ISBN 5-88896-051-9.
- Левитан И. И. (1956). Письма, документы, воспоминания / А. А. Фёдоров-Давыдов (in Russian). М.: Искусство. p. 335.
- Лобашов В. К. (2001). "Музы Левитана в Удомельском крае". Вышневолоцкий историко-краеведческий альманах (in Russian) (5). Вышний Волочёк: 73–89.
- Лясковская О. А. (1966). Пленер в русской живописи XIX века (in Russian). М.: Искусство. p. 192.
- Лужецкая А. Н. (1965). Техника масляной живописи русских мастеров с XVIII по начало XX века [ru]. М.: Искусство. p. 192.
- Мальцева Ф. С.; et al. (И. Э. Грабарь, В. Н. Лазарев, А. А. Сидоров, О. А. Швидковский) (1968). И. И. Левитан и пейзажная живопись 1890-х годов // История русского искусства (in Russian). Vol. 10. М.: Наука. pp. 108–178.
- Мальцева Ф. С. (2002). Мастера русского пейзажа. Вторая половина XIX века. Часть 4 (in Russian). М.: Искусство. p. 84. ISBN 9785210013484.
- Нестеров М. В. (1986). Давние дни: воспоминания, очерки, письма (in Russian). Уфа: Башкирское книжное издательство. p. 559.
- Петров В. А. (1992). Исаак Ильич Левитан. Русские живописцы XIX века (in Russian). Saint Petersburg: Художник России. ISBN 5-7370-0212-8.
- Петров В. А. (2000). Исаак Левитан. М.: Белый город. ISBN 5-7793-0250-2.
- Петрунина Л. Я. (2012). Выставка И. И. Левитана глазами зрителей (PDF). Третьяковские чтения 2010—2011 (in Russian). М.: Инико. pp. 606–618. ISBN 978-5-89580-106-2.
- Пророкова С. А. (1960). Левитан. Жизнь замечательных людей. М.: Молодая гвардия.
- Прытков В. А. (1960). Левитан (in Russian). М.: Издательство Академии художеств СССР. p. 132.
- Репин И. Е. (1946). Переписка с П. М. Третьяковым, 1873—1898 / М. Н. Григорьева (in Russian). М.: Искусство. p. 255.
- Рогинская Ф. С. (1989). Товарищество передвижных художественных выставок (in Russian). М.: Искусство. p. 430.
- Стернин Г. Ю. (2009). От Репина до Врубеля (in Russian). М.: Галарт. p. 208.
- Турков А. М. (1974). Исаак Ильич Левитан. Жизнь в искусстве (in Russian). М.: Искусство. p. 160.
- Фёдоров-Давыдов А. А. (1966). Исаак Ильич Левитан. Жизнь и творчество (in Russian). М.: Искусство. p. 403.
- Фёдоров-Давыдов А. А. (1975). Картина И. Левитана "Озеро". Русское и советское искусство. Статьи и очерки (in Russian). М.: Искусство. pp. 574–588.
- Фёдоров-Давыдов А. А. (1986). Русский пейзаж XVIII — начала XX века (in Russian). М.: Советский художник. p. 304.
- Цветков Д. А. (1977). Старица и окрестности (in Russian). М.: Московский рабочий. p. 168.
- Чижмак М. С. (2010). "Хроника жизни и творчества Исаака Левитана" (PDF). Третьяковская галерея3 (in Russian) (3): 58–71.
- Шер Н. С. (1966). Рассказы о русских художниках (in Russian). М.: Детская литература. p. 394.
- Государственная Третьяковская галерея — каталог собрания / Я. В. Брук, Л. И. Иовлева. Moscow: Красная площадь, 2001. V. 4: Живопись второй половины XIX века, book 1, А—М. 528 p. ISBN 5-900743-56-X.
- Захаров И. В. (2005). Пушкин в воспоминаниях современников (in Russian). Захаров. p. 911.
- Товарищество передвижных художественных выставок. Письма, документы. 1869—1899 / В. В. Андреева, М. В. Астафьева, С. Н. Гольдштейн, Н. Л. Приймак. Moscow: Искусство, 1987. 668 p.
