= Vladimirka (painting) =

1892 painting by Isaac Levitan

- Владимирка (Russian)
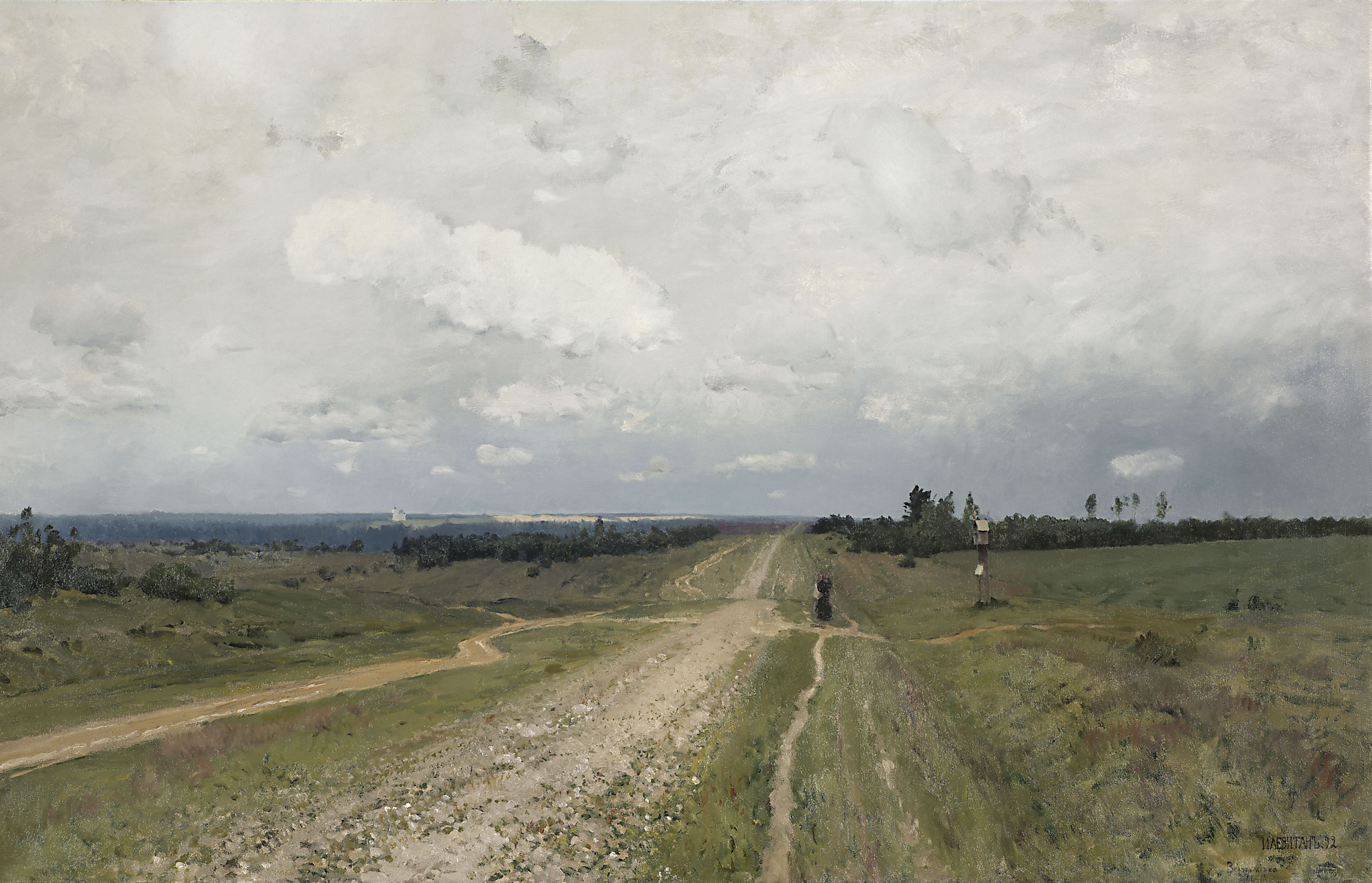
- Artist: Isaac Levitan
- Year: 1892
- Medium: Oil on canvas
- Dimensions: 79 cm × 123 cm (31 in × 48 in)
- Location: Tretyakov Gallery, Moscow

Vladimirka (Note: Also called The Vladimirka Road) (Russian: Владимирка) is an 1892 oil painting by the Russian artist Isaac Levitan. The painting depicts the Vladimir Highway, a dirt road leading east from Moscow to Vladimir. Vladimirka is one of three large paintings by Levitan completed in the first half of the 1890s. Together with By the Pool (1892) and Over Eternal Peace (1894), they are sometimes referred to as Levitan's "gloomy trilogy".

Levitan began sketching Vladimirka in 1892, when he was living in the Vladimir Governorate of the Russian Empire. The painting was completed in Moscow the same year. It was displayed at the Society for Travelling Art Exhibitions' 21st exhibition in February 1893, which opened in Saint Petersburg and then moved to Moscow in March. Levitan donated the painting to the Tretyakov Gallery in March 1894, where it is still housed today.

According to artist Mikhail Nesterov, Vladimirka could be "boldly called a Russian historical landscape, of which there are few in our art". Art historian Aleksei Fedorov-Davydov described the painting as one of Levitan's best; it was his "universally recognised masterpiece", in which "deep social content is expressed organically and directly in the landscape".

== History ==
Levitan left Moscow for the Vladimir Governorate on 12 May 1892, accompanied by the artist Sofia Kuvshinnikova. They settled in Gorodok, a village on the Peksha River (now part of Peksha village, Vladimir Oblast). On 13 May, Levitan wrote to Pavel Tretyakov: "I've settled in a pretty nice area and I'm thinking of working here". He spent the summer of 1892 there. The house Levitan lived in was later turned into a museum before being destroyed by fire on 22 August 1999.

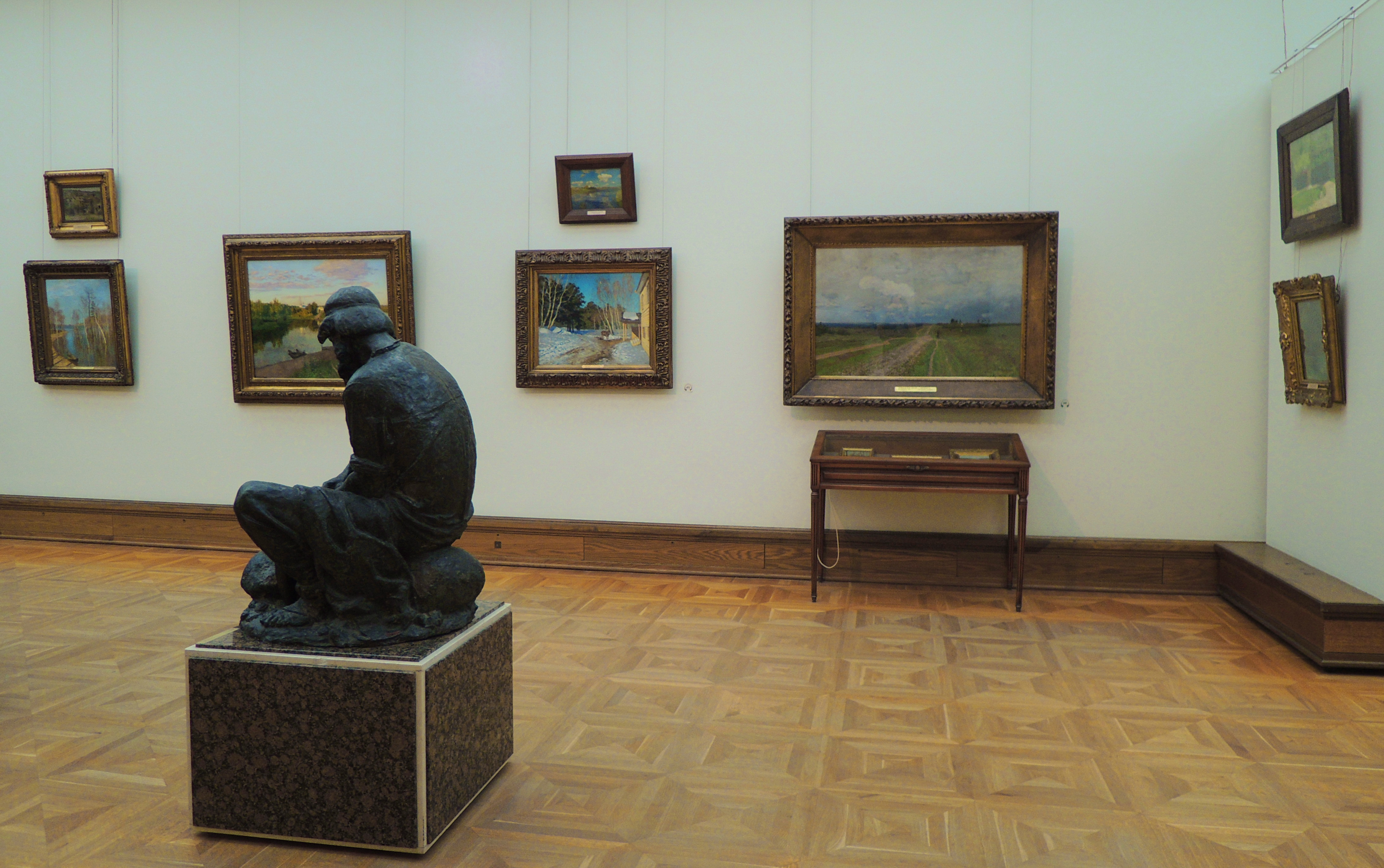
Vladimirka on display at the Tretyakov Gallery

Kuvshinnikova wrote about the source of inspiration for Levitan's Vladimirka. On one occasion, as they were returning from a hunt, they emerged onto the Vladimir Highway, an unpaved road that ran east from Moscow and was frequently used to ferry prisoners to Siberia for exile. Kuvshinnikova summarised their feelings as follows: "The view had a wonderful, quiet charm to it. Between the trees, a long, white-washed stretch of road extended into the distance. A crumbling old dovecote with a weathered icon and two distant golubets (a roof on a grave or worship cross) both hinted at long-forgotten antiquity. Everything seemed soft and cozy". Levitan later recalled that this was the same Vladimirka where the chained prisoners had travelled to Siberia. In the days that followed, Levitan came back to this road several times to paint a sketch for a future painting. He finished the sketch in a few sessions. Then, in order to quickly paint the picture he had imagined, he departed for Moscow. The work on the canvas was swiftly finished after being recently inspired by the landscape seen on the Vladimir Highway. After completing the work, Levitan inscribed the title of the painting—Володимірка (Vladimirka)—on the canvas. The artist had never previously added painting titles to his canvases, so this was an unusual step for him.

Vladimirka and four other Levitan works were exhibited at the Society for Travelling Art Exhibitions' twenty-first exhibition, which debuted in Saint Petersburg in February 1893 before moving to Moscow in March. The landscape paintings in the exhibition received very little attention from Saint Petersburg critics; the only mention of Vladimirka was in the 47th issue of the Peterburgskaya Gazeta on 18 February 1893, where it was noted that Vladimirka had "the most unattractive 'grey' motives" and the author remarked, "What could be more boring than 'Vladimirka' by Levitan?" More reviews of the painting appeared in the press after the exhibition was relocated to Moscow, the majority of which were complimentary; in particular, Vladimir Sizov (Russkiye Vedomosti), Vladimir Gringmut (Moskovskiye Vedomosti), and Mikhail Korelin (Russkaya mysl) all praised the work.

Despite the positive reviews, the painting was not purchased during the exhibition. Levitan gave the painting to the Tretyakov Gallery a year later, in March 1894. In a letter to Pavel Tretyakov dated 11 March 1894, Levitan wrote: "'Vladimirka' will probably return from the exhibition one of these days; take it and calm me and her [the painting]".

== Description ==
"Vladimirka" was a common name for the Vladimir Highway, notorious for being the road where prisoners were transported to Siberia on foot. Prisoners were being transported by train by the time the painting was created at the end of the 19th century.

The painting depicts a vast plain with a road that extends from the foreground into the middle, passing through woods and fields before vanishing in the horizon's blue haze. Vladimirka has an immense depth of field, drawing the viewer's attention all the way to the horizon. The length of the road is highlighted by the narrow paths that run alongside it on either side. Two other paths also cross the street from left to right. There is a golubets on the right where a praying woman is standing with her knapsack on her shoulders. According to Averil King, the lonely figure of the woman praying to the golubets, the cloudy landscape and the desolate road all create a "picture filled with sadness and foreboding" that suggests "the despair of the shackled men and women who had trudged eastward through these lonely wastes". The only signs of hope are the bright spot in the horizon and the distant white church.

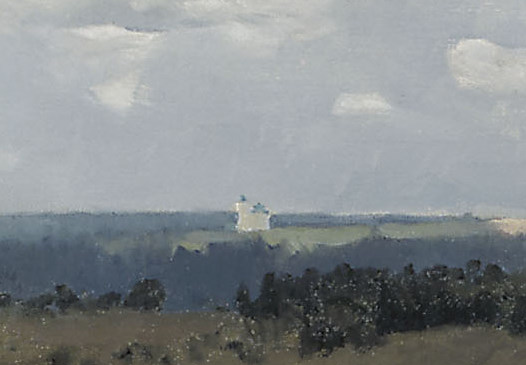
White church on the horizon

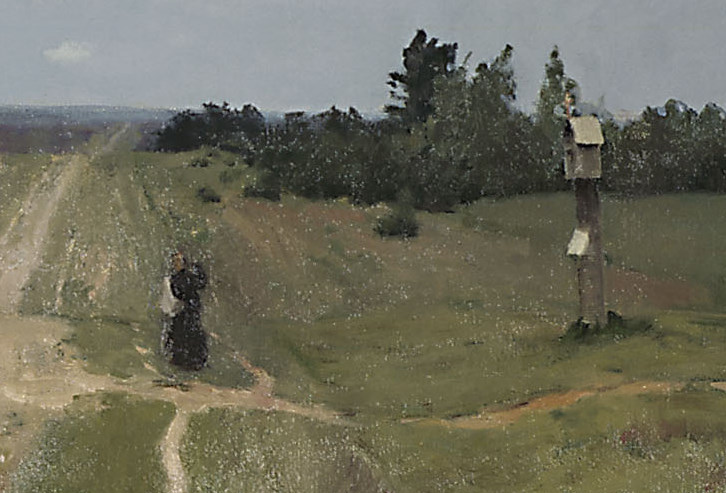
Praying woman and the golubets

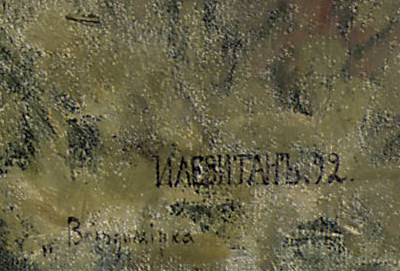
Signature of I. I. Levitan

Vladimirka is rendered with broad brushstrokes in grey-blue and ash tones. The muted colours used to depict a grey, gloomy day determine the colour tonality of the landscape. The lighter colours of the white church and the yellow stripe of ripening rye near the horizon do not stand out in this colouristic scheme. Despite using a muted palette, the painter is able to maintain the depth and variety of colour; he retains all the hues found in nature and incorporates them harmoniously into the landscape, giving it a single tone. Levitan accomplishes this by blending various colours together and making delicate transitions between tones. Vladimirka, together with By the Pool (1892) and Over Eternal Peace (1894), is sometimes referred to as Levitan's "gloomy trilogy".

== Sketches and replications ==
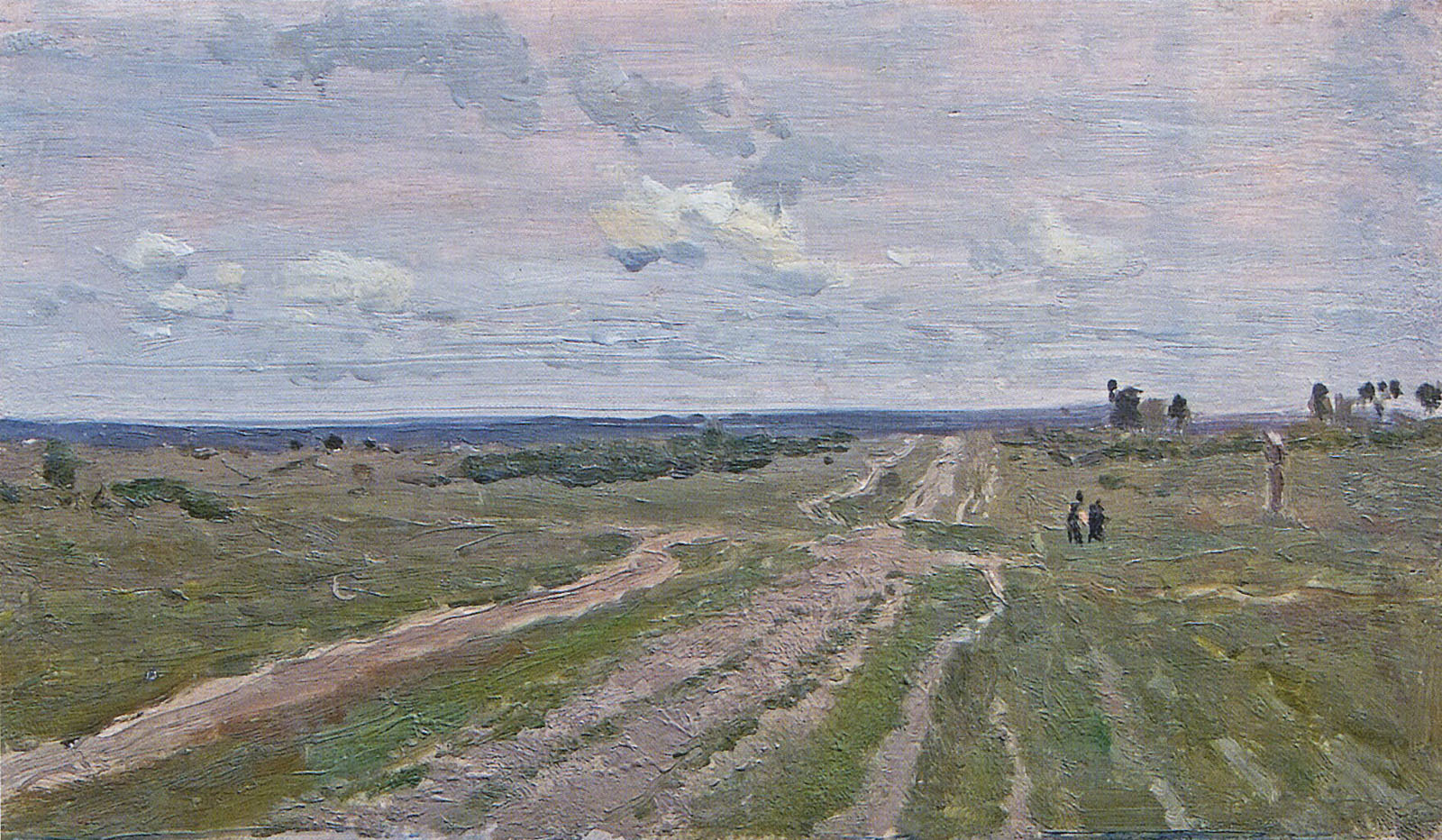
1892 sketch of Vladimirka now in a private collection

An oil-on-cardboard sketch of Vladimirka in the size of 10 by 16.5 centimetres (3.9 in × 6.5 in) is in the collection of the Moscow collector A. M. Koludarov, having previously been in the collections of Nikolai Mesherin and N. Yu. Kislitsin. Levitan gifted another sketch of the painting to Mikhail Chekhov. Chekhov later gave the sketch to Ivan Belousov, but it was lost "during the move from one apartment to another". The current location of the sketch is unknown.

There is also one known replication of the painting by Levitan made in the 1890s in the size of 50.5 by 80.2 centimetres (19.9 in × 31.6 in) that was initially in the collection of Z. Z. Rabinovich. Initially commissioned by the physician and collector Ivan Troyanovsky, this replication became part of the collections of A. N. Lyapunov since 1917, Yevgeniy Opochinin since 1922 and later I. I. Ilyin-Goldman.

== Reception ==
In his book Long Days, artist Mikhail Nesterov recalled how much he admired Levitan's Vladimirka. He stated that one could "boldly call this painting the Russian historical landscape, of which there is little in our art". Nesterov wrote that Vladimirka successfully combined "historical fiction with a complete, finished workmanship" and that it is "one of the most mature creations" of the artist in a letter he sent to the art historian Vladimir Kemenov on 10 October 1938.

Art historian Aleksei Fedorov-Davydov stated that Vladimirka is one of Levitan's best works and his "universally recognised masterpiece" in his monograph on the artist. He thought that this painting's "deep social content is expressed organically and directly in the landscape". Fedorov-Davydov states that Levitan portrays nature in this painting in a conventional manner while revealing the rich inner content of even the most commonplace objects through the "most simple and ordinary motive of the plain with the road going away". According to him, the road that forms the foundation of the image motif successfully draws the viewer into the complexity of the landscape and progressively reveals its inner meaning.

According to art historian Faina Maltseva, Vladimirka's significance in Russian realist art of the 1890s can not be overstated. Maltseva believed that Levitan was able to capture the sorrow and pathos of citizenship in his works "without undermining the beauty of Russian nature, without diminishing the poetic beauty and grandeur of its image". Art historian Vladimir Petrov noted that Vladimirka is a rare instance of a polyphonic historical landscape.

Poet Korney Chukovsky, after visiting Levitan's exhibition, wrote: "admire his Vladimirka. What a greedy distance, what a frenzy of its scope! Inspirational, intoxicating, beckoning breadth...". Drawing a parallel with the infamous Vladimir Highway, Chukovsky questioned whether it could represent all of the great artist's creations, with his calm and reconciled awareness of the hopelessness of all Faustian impulses of the human spirit.

== Literature ==
- Chester, Pamela; Forrester, Sibelan (1996). Engendering Slavic Literatures. Indiana University Press. ISBN 978-0-253-33016-1.
- Fedorov-Davydov, Aleksei (1966). Исаак Ильич Левитан. Жизнь и творчество [Isaac Ilyich Levitan. Life and art] (in Russian). Moscow: Iskusstvo.
- Fedorov-Davydov, Aleksei, ed. (1966). Исаак Ильич Левитан. Документы, материалы, библиография [Isaac Ilyich Levitan. Documents, materials, bibliography] (PDF) (in Russian). Moscow: Iskusstvo.
- Levitan, Isaac (1956). Fedorov-Davydov, Aleksei (ed.). Письма, документы, воспоминания [Letters, documents, memoirs] (in Russian). Moscow: Iskusstvo. ISBN 978-5-8114-3660-6.
- King, Averil (2 January 2004). Isaak Levitan: Lyrical Landscape. Bloomsbury USA. ISBN 978-0-85667-576-8.
- Maltseva, Faina (2002). Мастера русского пейзажа. Вторая половина XIX века. Часть 4 [Masters of the Russian landscape. Second half of the 19th century. Part 4] (in Russian). Moscow: Iskusstvo. ISBN 978-5-210-01348-4.
- Nesterov, Mikhail (1986). Pigaryov, Kirill (ed.). Давние дни: воспоминания, очерки, письма [Old days: memoirs, essays, letters.] (in Russian). Moscow: Ufa.
- Petrov, Vladimir (1992). Исаак Ильич Левитан [Isaac Ilyich Levitan] (in Russian). Saint Petersburg: Artist of Russia. ISBN 978-5-7370-0212-1.
- Petrov, Vladimir (2000). Исаак Левитан [Isaac Levitan] (in Russian). Moscow: Beliy gorod. ISBN 978-5-7793-0250-0.
- Prorokova, Sofia (1960). Левитан [Levitan] (in Russian). Moscow: Molodaya gvardiya.
- Prytkov, Vladimir (1960). Левитан (in Russian). Moscow: Publishing House of the Academy of Arts of the USSR.
- Sergeev, Evgeny (2004). Владимирка: дорога-памятник России [Vladimirka: the road-monument of Russia] (in Russian). Moscow: Olga. ISBN 978-5-902138-02-0.
- Sher, Nadezhda (1966). Рассказы о русских художниках [Stories about Russian artists] (in Russian). Moscow: Detskaya Literatura.
- Stewart, Sean (14 July 2015). It's Russia, My Son. A (partial) Roadmap of the Russian Soul. Dog Ear Publishing. ISBN 978-1-4575-3821-6.
- Turkov, Andrei (1974). Исаак Ильич Левитан [Isaac Ilyich Levitan] (in Russian). Moscow: Iskusstvo.
