= Peksha =

Peksha Пекша
- Village
- Location within Vladimir Oblast Location within Russia
- Coordinates: 55°57′N 39°42′E
- Country: Russia
- Region: Vladimir Oblast
- District: Petushinsky District
- Time zone: UTC+3:00

Peksha (Russian: Пекша) is a rural locality (a village) and the administrative center of Pekshinskoye Rural Settlement, Petushinsky District, Vladimir Oblast, Russia. The population was 907 as of the 2010 census. The village contains 15 streets.

== Geography ==
Peksha is located on the Peksha River, 19 km east of Petushki (the district's administrative centre), by road. Cherkasovo is the nearest rural locality.
