= Bakulino =

Bakulino (Russian: Бакулино) is the name of several rural localities in Russia:

- Bakulino, Moscow Oblast, a village in Poretskoye Rural Settlement of Mozhaysky District in Moscow Oblast; 55°37′N 35°35′E
- Bakulino, Vologda Oblast, a village in Nesterovsky Selsoviet of Sokolsky District in Vologda Oblast
