= Abbakumovo, Moscow Oblast =

Abbakumovo Аббакумово
- Village
- Location within Moscow Oblast Location within Russia
- Coordinates: 56°00′N 37°31′E
- Country: Russia
- Region: Moscow Oblast
- District: Mytishchinsky District
- Time zone: [[UTC+3:00]]

Abbakumovo (Russian: Аббаку́мово) is a rural locality (a village) in Mytishchinsky District, Moscow Oblast, Russia. The population was 102 as of 2010. There are 30 streets.

== Geography ==
Abbakumovo is located 28 km northwest of Mytishchi (the district's administrative centre) by road. Yeremino is the nearest rural locality.
