= Abakumov =

Abakumov (Russian: Абаку́мов; masculine) or Abakumova (Абаку́мова; feminine) is a Russian surname. Variants of this surname include Abbakumov/Abbakumova (Аббаку́мов/Аббаку́мова), Avakumov/Avakumova (Аваку́мов/Аваку́мова), Avvakumov/Avvakumova (Авваку́мов/Авваку́мова). All these are patronymic surnames derived from various forms of the Christian male first name Avvakum.

== People with the surname ==
- Dmitry Abakumov (born 1989), Russian association football player
- Ekaterina Avvakumova (born 1990), Russian and South Korean biathlete
- Igor Abakoumov (Abakumov) (born 1981), Soviet-born Belgian professional road bicycle racer
- Irina Avvakumova (born 1991), Russian ski jumper
- Mariya Abakumova (born 1986), Russian Olympic javelin thrower
- Viktor Abakumov (1908–1954), Soviet security official
- Yuri Avvakumov, Russian architect, artist, and curator

== See also ==
- Abakumovo, several rural localities in Russia
- Abbakumovo, several rural localities in Russia
