= Abbakumovo, Petushinsky District, Vladimir Oblast =

Village in Vladimir Oblast, Russia

Abbakumovo Аббакумово
- Village
- Location within Vladimir Oblast Location within Russia
- Coordinates: 55°55′N 39°41′E
- Country: Russia
- Region: Vladimir Oblast
- District: Petushinsky District
- Time zone: [[UTC+3:00]]

Abbakumovo (Russian: Аббаку́мово) is a rural locality (a village) in Pekshinskoye Rural Settlement, Petushinsky District, Vladimir Oblast, Russia. The population was 50 as of 2010. There are 8 streets.

== Geography ==
The village is located on the bank of the Peksha River, 23 km east of Petushki (the district's administrative centre) by road. Zheltukhino is the nearest rural locality.
