= Abakumovo, Ryazan Oblast =

Abakumovo Абакумово
- Selo
- Location within Ryazan Oblast Location within Russia
- Coordinates: 54°15′N 39°34′E
- Country: Russia
- Region: Ryazan Oblast
- District: Pronsky District
- Time zone: [[UTC+3:00]]

Abakumovo (Russian: Абакумово) is a rural locality (a selo) in Tyrnovskoye Rural Settlement of Pronsky District, Ryazan Oblast, Russia. The population was 141 as of 2010. There are 5 streets.

== Geography ==
Abakumovo is located 17 km north of Pronsk (the district's administrative centre) by road. Popovka is the nearest rural locality.
