= Abbakumovo, Gus-Khrustalny District, Vladimir Oblast =

Abbakumovo Аббакумово
- Village
- Location within Vladimir Oblast Location within Russia
- Coordinates: 55°38′N 40°22′E
- Country: Russia
- Region: Vladimir Oblast
- District: Gus-Khrustalny District
- Time zone: [[UTC+3:00]]

Abbakumovo (Russian: Аббаку́мово) is a rural locality (a village) in Posyolok Urshelsky of Gus-Khrustalny District, Vladimir Oblast, Russia. The population was 117 (2021 census), with no significant change from similar 117 as of 2010.

== Geography ==
The village is located on the bank of the Pol River, 26 km west of Gus-Khrustalny (the district's administrative centre) by road. Zabolotye is the nearest rural locality.
