= Abakumovo, Novosibirsk Oblast =

Abakumovo Абакумово
- Settlement
- Location within Novosibirsk Oblast Location within Russia
- Coordinates: 55°11′N 78°38′E
- Country: Russia
- Region: Novosibirsk Oblast
- District: Barabinsky District
- Time zone: [[UTC+7:00]]

Abakumovo (Russian: Абакумово) is a rural locality (a village) in Taskayevsky Selsoviet of Barabinsky District, Novosibirsk Oblast, Russia. The population was 103 as of 2010. There are 5 streets.

== Geography ==
Abakumovo is located 34 km southeast of Barabinsk (the district's administrative centre) by road. Karmyshak is the nearest rural locality.

== History ==
The village is based in 1932.
