= Vladimir Highway =

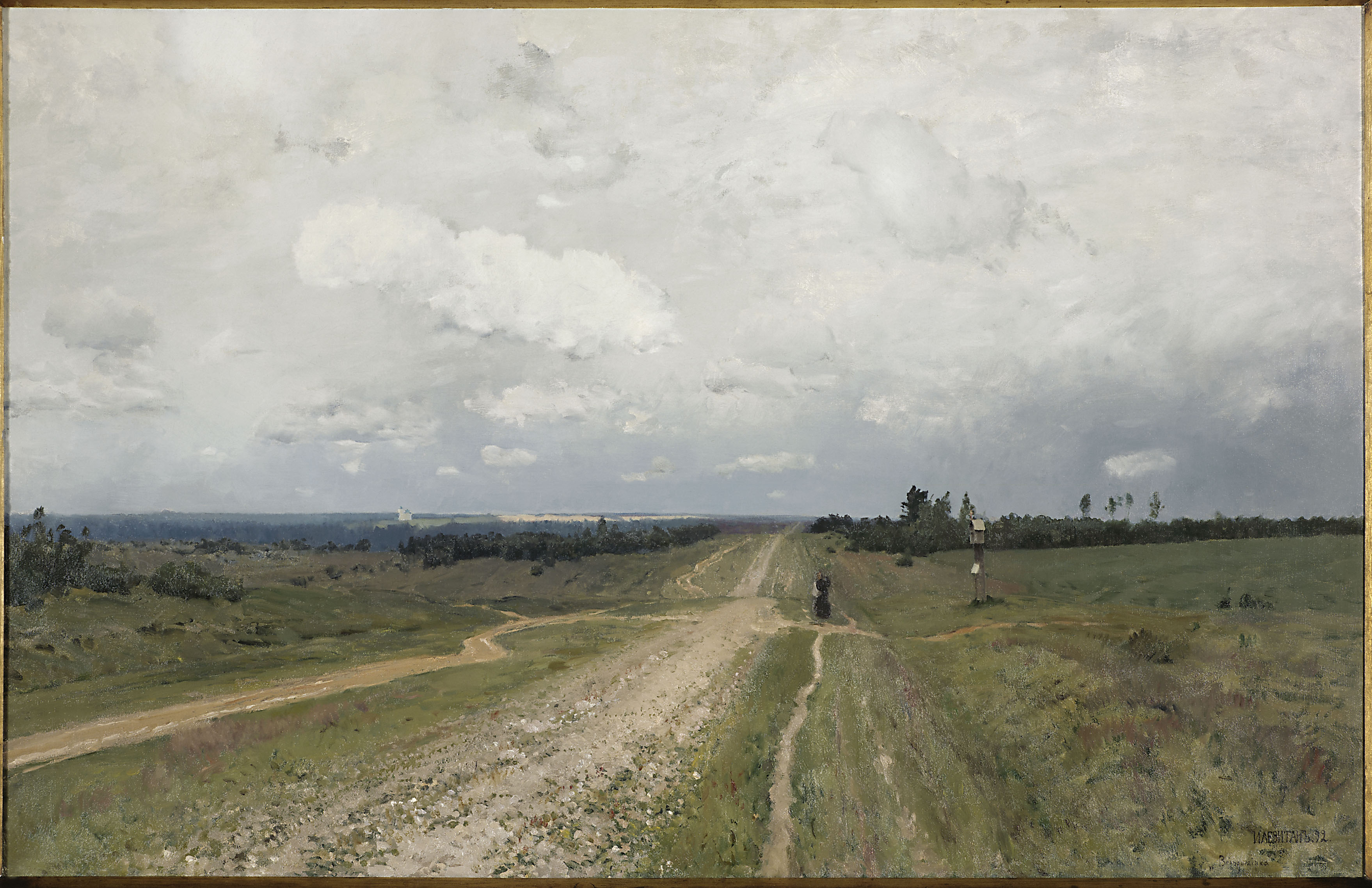
In Isaak Levitan's well-known "mood landscape", the Vladimirka takes on a symbolic meaning.

The Vladimir Highway (Russian: Влади́мирский тракт, Vladimirskiy trakt), familiarly known as the Vladimirka (Влади́мирка), was a road leading east from Moscow to Vladimir and Nizhny Novgorod. Its length was about 190 kilometres (120 mi).

The road has been mentioned in documents since the Middle Ages, when it connected the political capital of Muscovy with the ancestral seat of the Grand Dukes of Vladimir-Suzdal. It was by this road that the Muscovite merchants travelled to the Makariev Fair. In connection with the ceremonial transfer of the Theotokos of Vladimir from Vladimir to Moscow in 1395, one Russian chronicler referred to the route as "the greatest of roads".

The Vladimir Highway was renovated in the mid-18th century when it became the westernmost section of the Great Siberian Road linking Siberia to Europe. There were a number of post stations with a ready supply of fresh horses. If one travelled post, it was possible to get from Moscow to Vladimir in less than 24 hours.

Since Siberia was a traditional place of exile, the Vladimirka witnessed crowds of prisoners in shackles marching from Moscow to the katorga. It is in connection with the penal function that the road figures in the works of Alexander Herzen, Nikolay Nekrasov, and Fyodor Dostoevsky (e.g., Crime and Punishment). As a result, a wealth of bitter associations accrued to it over the course of the 19th century; they are embodied in Isaak Levitan's eponymous painting (1892), representing the Vladimirka as a "lonely track going on into the empty distance enlivened only by a church and the vast lowering sky".

After the Russian Revolution, the Bolsheviks were keen to get rid of the notorious name, rebranding the Moscow section of the road as Shosse Entuziastov ("Enthusiasts' Highway"). The modernized Soviet highway became known as the Volga Motorway.
