= Ivan Bakulin =

Ivan Bakulin may refer to

- Ivan Bakulin (diplomat) (1906–1963), ambassador of the Soviet Union to Afghanistan from 1943 to 1947
- Ivan Bakulin (footballer) (born 1986), Russian footballer
- Ivan Bakulin (partisan) (1900–1942), Hero of the Soviet Union
