= Abbakumovo, Vladimir, Vladimir Oblast =

Abbakumovo Аббакумово
- Village
- Location within Vladimir Oblast Location within Russia
- Coordinates: 56°04′N 40°33′E
- Country: Russia
- Region: Vladimir Oblast
- District: Vladimir
- Time zone: [[UTC+3:00]]

Abbakumovo (Russian: Аббакумово) is a rural locality (a village) in Vladimir, Vladimir Oblast, Russia. The population was 25 as of 2010. There are 2 streets.

== Geography ==
Abbakumovo is located 16 km southeast of Vladimir (the district's administrative centre) by road. Shepelevo is the nearest rural locality.
