= Bakulino, Vologda Oblast =

Bakulino Бакулино
- Village
- Location within Vologda Oblast Location within Russia
- Coordinates: 59°40′N 40°03′E
- Country: Russia
- Region: Vologda Oblast
- District: Sokolsky District
- Time zone: UTC+3:00

Bakulino (Russian: Бакулино) is a rural locality (a village) in Nesterovskoye Rural Settlement, Sokolsky District, Vologda Oblast, Russia. The population was 6 as of 2002.

== Geography ==
Bakulino is located 37 km north of Sokol (the district's administrative centre) by road. Ugol is the nearest rural locality.
