= Nicholas Savich Bakulin =

Russian painter

Nicholas Savich Bakulin (Russian: Николай Саввич Бакулин; 29 March 1896 – 10 April 1962) was a Russian emigré painter and illustrator.

Bakulin graduated from Moscow Technical High School in 1913, then in 1914-1915 he studied at the Moscow School of Painting, Sculpture and Architecture. He painted portraits and narrative compositions dedicated to the White Movement during the Russian Civil War.

Bakulin also painted for Russian magazines and restaurants in Prague.
