= Abakumovo, Arkhangelsk Oblast =

Abakumovo Абакумово
- Village
- Location within Arkhangelsk Oblast Location within Russia
- Coordinates: 61°35′N 39°03′E
- Country: Russia
- Region: Arkhangelsk Oblast
- District: Kargopolsky District
- Time zone: [[UTC+3:00]]

Abakumovo (Russian: Абакумово) is a rural locality (a village) in Pavlovskoye of Kargopolsky District, Arkhangelsk Oblast, Russia. The population was 95 as of 2012. There are 9 streets.

== Geography ==
Abakumovo is located 12 km northeast of Kargopol (the district's administrative centre) by road. Chertovitsy Nizhniye is the nearest rural locality.
