= Avvakum (given name) =

Russian masculine given name

Avvakum (Russian: Аввакум) is a Russian Christian male first name. It is derived from Ἀμβακοὺμ (Ambakoum), the Koine Greek form, as rendered in the Septuagint, of Habakkuk, a prophet of the Hebrew Bible. The etymology of Habakkuk is opaque, though it has been thought by some to derive from the Hebrew root חבק "embrace", in which case the meaning might be (God's) embrace. Alternately, the name is possibly related to the Akkadian khabbaququ, the name of a fragrant plant. Abakum (Абаку́м) is a variant of this first name. Other variants include Old Church Slavonic Amvakum (Амваку́м), literary Ambakum (Амбаку́м), and colloquial forms Obakum (Обаку́м), Bakum (Баку́м), and Bakun (Баку́н). The diminutives of "Avvakum" include Avvakumka (Авваку́мка) and Avvakusha (Авваку́ша), while the diminutives of "Abakum" are Abakumka (Абаку́мка) and Abasha (Аба́ша).

The patronymics derived from "Avvakum" are "Авваку́мович" (Avvakumovich; masculine) and its colloquial form "Авваку́мыч" (Avvakumych), and "Авваку́мовна" (Avvakumovna; feminine). The patronymics derived from "Abakum" are "Абаку́мович" (Abakumovich; masculine) and its colloquial form "Абаку́мыч" (Abakumych), and "Абаку́мовна" (Abakumovna; feminine).

Last names Abakumov, Abakishin, Abakulov, Abakumkin, Abakushin, Abakshin, Abbakumov, Avakumov, Avvakumov, and possibly Bakulin and Bakunin all derive from this first name.
