= Mytishchinsky District =

Mytishchinsky District Мытищинский район (Russian)
- District
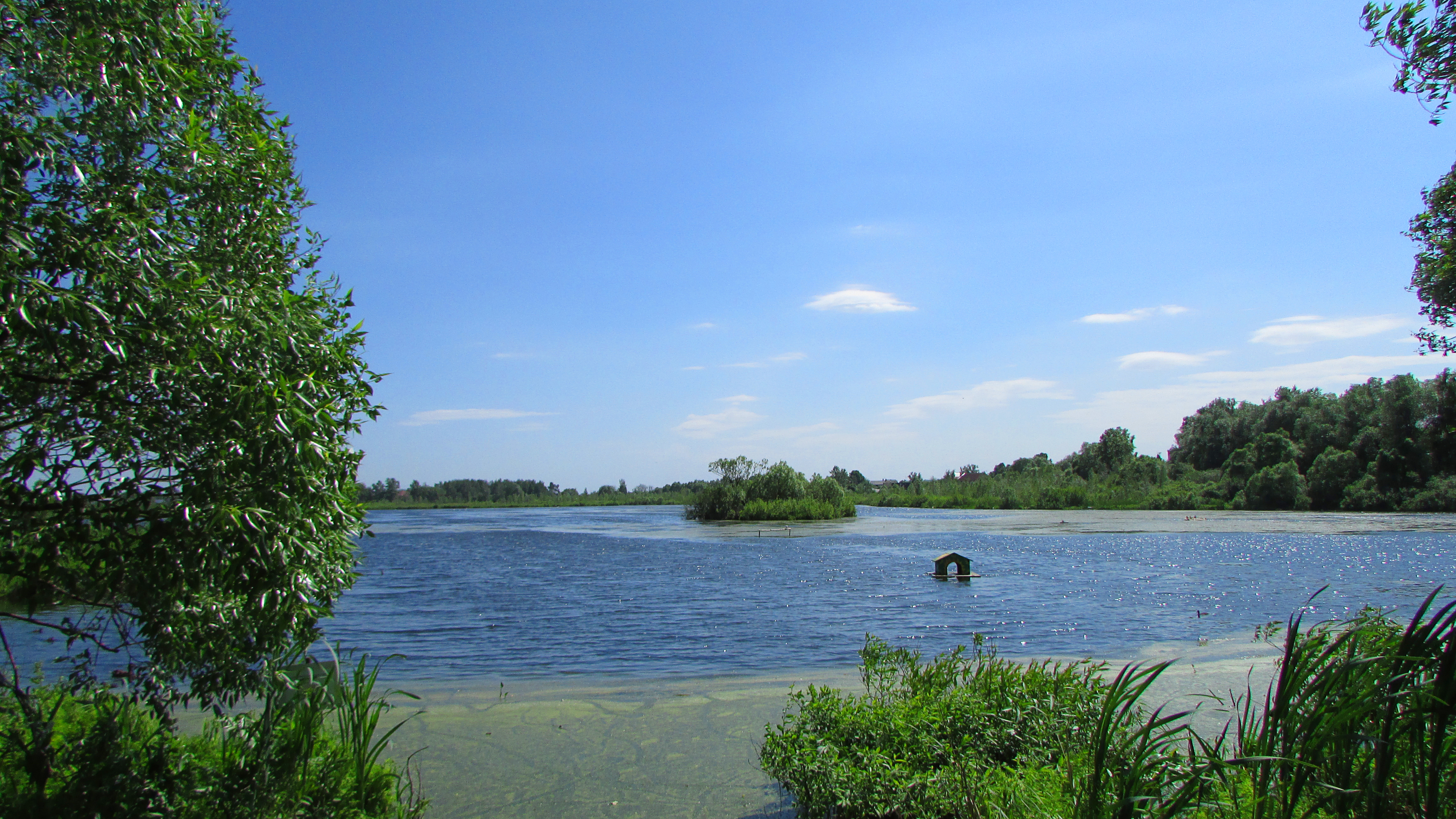
- Lake Kiyovo, a protected area of Russia in Mytishchinsky District

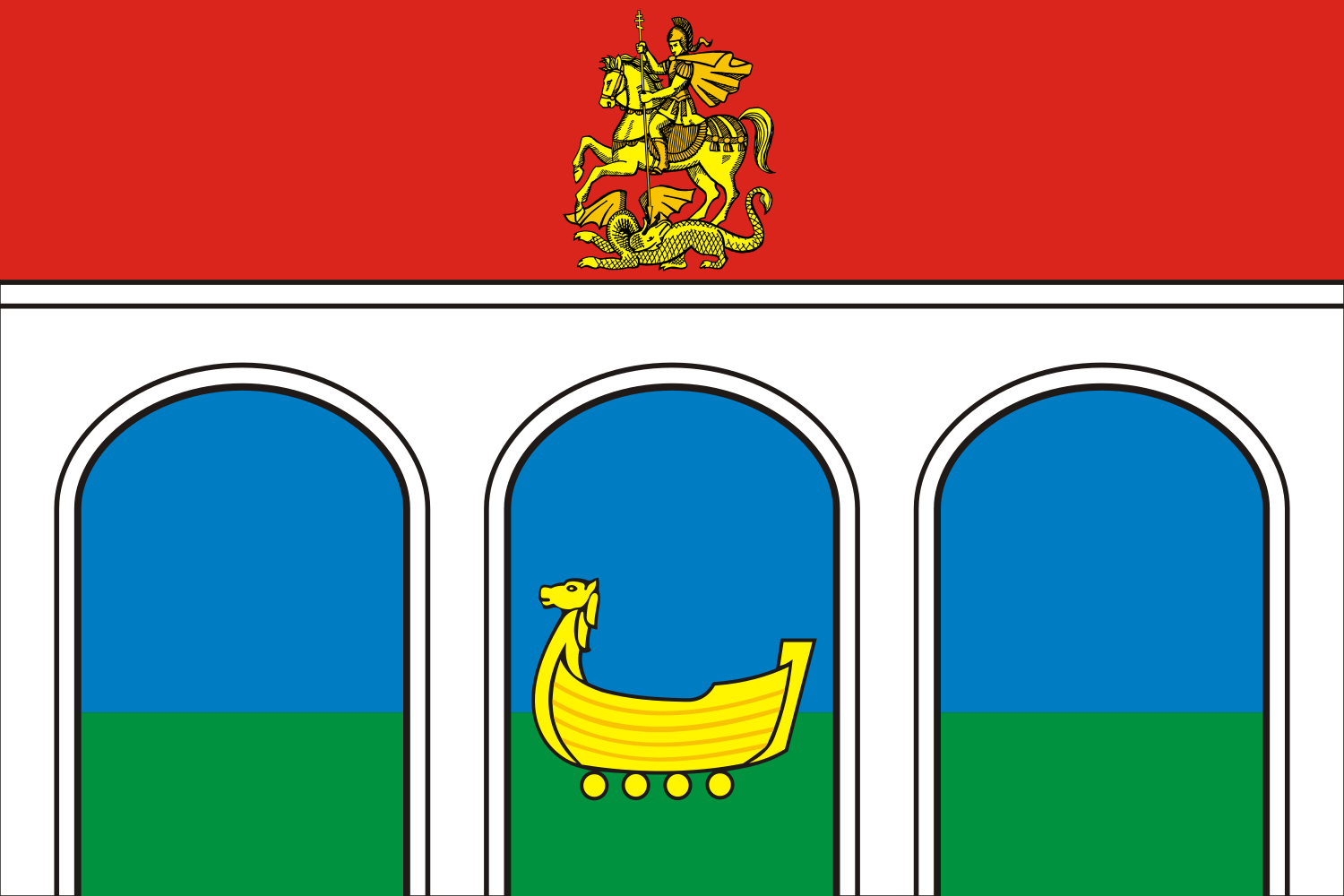
- Flag Coat of arms
- Location of Mytishchinsky District in Moscow Oblast (before July 2012)
- Coordinates: 55°55′N 37°46′E
- Country: Russia
- Federal subject: Moscow Oblast
- Established: 2015
- Administrative center: Mytishchi

Area
  - Total: 431.16 km^{2} (166.47 sq mi)

Population (2010 Census)
  - Total: 203,393
  - Density: 471.73/km^{2} (1,221.8/sq mi)
  - Urban: 88.4%
  - Rural: 11.6%

Administrative structure
  - Administrative divisions: 1 Towns, 1 Work settlements, 1 Rural settlements
  - Inhabited localities: 1 cities/towns, 1 urban-type settlements, 92 rural localities

Municipal structure
  - Municipally incorporated as: Mytishchinsky Municipal District
  - Municipal divisions: 2 urban settlements, 1 rural settlements
- Time zone: UTC+3 (MSK)
- OKTMO ID: 46746000
- Website: http://www.mytyshi.ru

Population of Mytishchinsky District
- 2010 Census: 203,393
- 2002 Census: 186,066
- 1989 Census: 33,723
- 1979 Census: 35,941

Mytishchinsky District (Russian: Мыти́щинский райо́н) is an administrative and municipal district (raion), one of the thirty-six in Moscow Oblast, Russia. It is located in the center of the oblast just north of the federal city of Moscow. The area of the district is 431.16 square kilometers (166.47 sq mi). Its administrative center is the city of Mytishchi. As of the 2010 Census, the total population of the district was 203,393, with the population of Mytishchi accounting for 85.1% of that number.

== Notable residents ==
- Nina Doroshina (1934—2018), actress, People's Artist of the RSFSR (1985)
