= Peksha (river) =

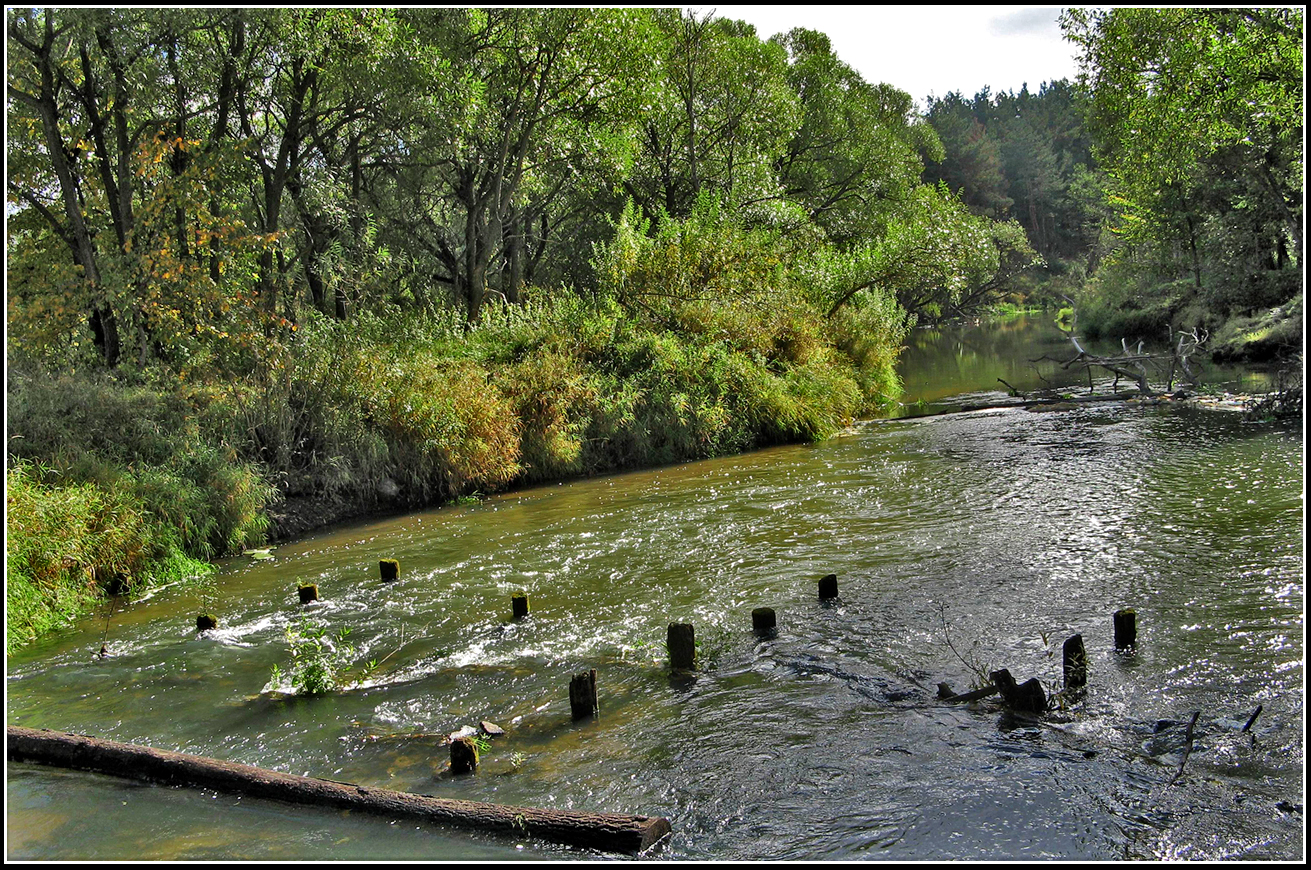
- Native name: Пекша (Russian)

Location
- Country: Russia

Physical characteristics
- Mouth: Klyazma
  - coordinates: 55.9188°N 39.4608°E
- Length: 127 km (79 mi)
- Basin size: 1,010 km^{2} (390 sq mi)

Basin features
- Progression: Klyazma→ Oka→ Volga→ Caspian Sea

The Peksha (Russian: Пекша) is a river in Vladimir Oblast, Russia. It is a left tributary of the Klyazma (Oka's tributary). It is 127 kilometres (79 mi) long, and has a drainage basin of 1,010 square kilometres (390 sq mi). The town of Kolchugino is situated by the Peksha.
