= Alexander Fyodorov-Davydov =

Russian children's writer, translator, editor and publisher

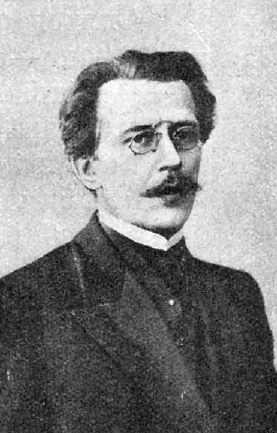
- Born: Alexander Alexandrovich Fyodorov-Davydov; Александр Александрович Фёдоров-Давыдов; 16 November 1875; Imperial Russia
- Died: 26 December 1936 (aged 61); Soviet Union
- Occupations: children's writer, translator, editor and publisher

Alexander Alexandrovich Fyodorov-Davydov (Russian: Александр Александрович Фёдоров-Давыдов, 16 November 1875 – 26 December 1936) was a Russian children's writer, translator, editor and publisher.

== Career ==
Having debuted with his first book (Zimniye Sumerki, Winter Twilight) in 1895, he authored in all 125 books and brochures for children, as well as a wealth of essays, sketches and articles. He translated into Russian the fairytales by Brothers Grimm (1900) and Hans Christian Andersen (1907) and in 1908 published an acclaimed compilation of Russian mystical folklore.

Fyodorov-Davydov edited and published three journals for children: Delo i Potekha (Business and Fun), Putevodny Ogonyok (Guiding Light) and Ogonyok, the first ever Russian magazine addressed to the readership of four to eight years of age. Among the authors he's managed to engage in these publications were Anton Chekhov, Vasily Nemirovich-Danchenko, Dmitry Mamin-Sibiryak, Pavel Zasodimsky, Konstantin Stanyukovich and Kazimir Barantsevich. He also authored some popular historical essays, some of which enjoyed popular separate editions (The Crusades, 1905). In 1918—1923 Fyodorov-Davydov was the head of the Svetlyachok publishing house.

After the October Revolution, Fyodorov-Davydov wrote up to forty books for young children and collaborated with the magazine Murzilka. His best post-revolutionary work is The Pranks of Pus-karapuz. A. A. Fyodorov-Davydov’s book The Adventures of Murzilka, the Remarkably Quick Little Dog went through several editions in the late 1920s.

== Personal Life and Death ==
He died in 1936 and was buried at Vvedenskoye Cemetery.

The art scholar Aleksei Fedorov-Davydov (1900-1969) was his son. German Fedorov-Davydov (1931-2000), a Soviet historian and archeologist was his grandson.
