= A Quiet Monastery =

1890 painting by Isaak Levitan

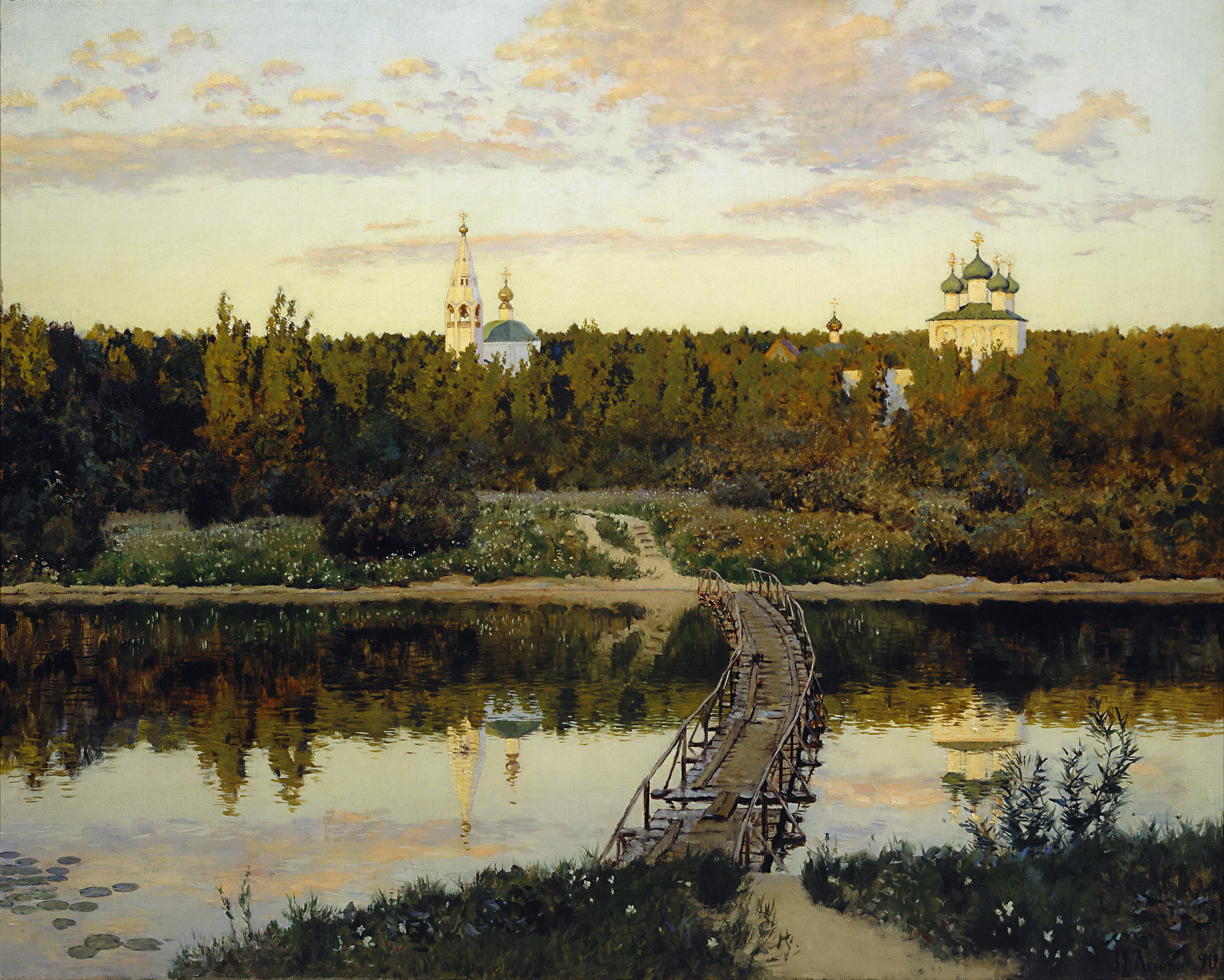
- Artist: Isaac Levitan
- Year: 1890
- Medium: Oil on canvas
- Dimensions: 87.5 cm × 108 cm (34.4 in × 43 in)
- Location: State Tretyakov Gallery, Moscow

A Quiet Monastery is a landscape by Russian artist Isaak Levitan (1860–1900), painted in 1890. It belongs to the State Tretyakov Gallery in Moscow (inventory number Zh-584). Its size is 87.5×108 cm.

This painting, in which Levitan weaves together his impressions of a number of monasteries he visited, was completed in 1890 after his trip to Upper Volga. In 1891, the painting was exhibited at the 19th exhibition of the Association of Travelling Art Exhibitions ("Peredvizhniki"), which was held in St. Petersburg and then in Moscow. "A Quiet Monastery" was a great success with the visitors of the exhibition and received high marks from the art critics, which finally confirmed the recognition of Levitan as one of the leading Russian landscape painters.

In the same year, 1891, the canvas was purchased for one of the private collections. After the revolution, the trace of the painting was lost, and its whereabouts remained unknown until 1960, when it was "found" in the private collection of the conductor Nikolai Golovanov. In 1970, the painting "A Quiet Monastery" was transferred to the State Tretyakov Gallery.

According to art critic Vladimir Stasov, "A Quiet Monastery" is Levitan's best painting "in the beauty and poetry of the tones of the evening sun". The art historian Alexei Fedorov-Davydov considers it to be one of Levitan's series of "mood landscapes," noting that this painting "was a kind of final stage of his long-standing work on the Volga," and that it "not only does not contradict Levitan's previous work, but follows naturally from it". Art historian Faina Maltseva wrote that the image created by the artist in "A Quiet Monastery" is "multifaceted in its content", creating in the soul "a feeling of peace, and quiet lyrical sadness, and rapturous admiration for the beauty of the summer evening".

== History ==
=== Previous events and work on the painting ===
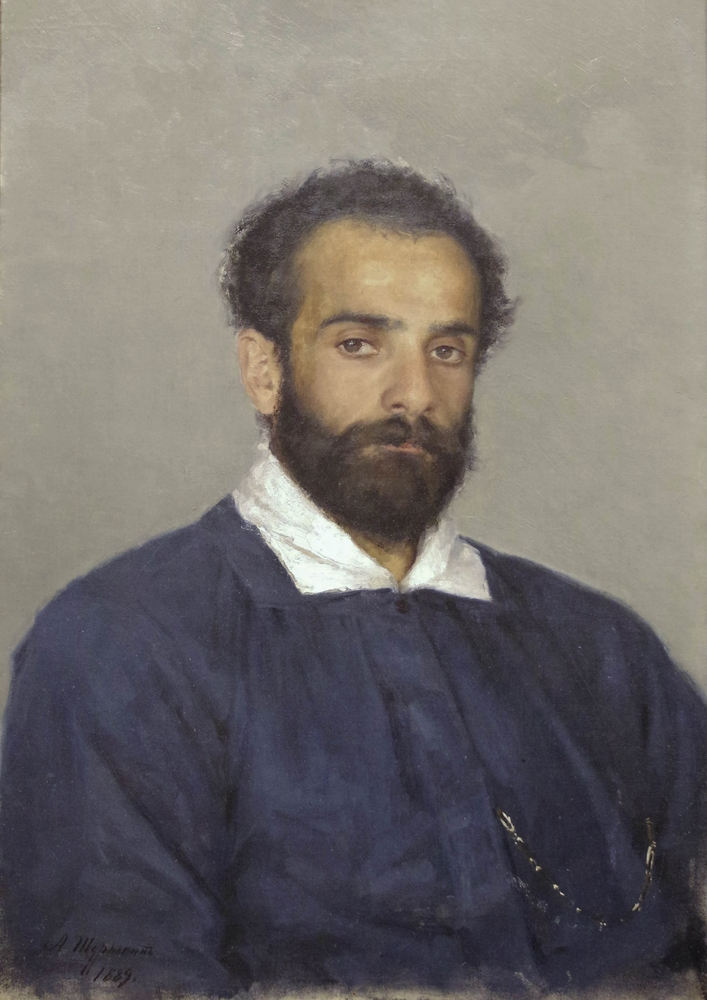
Alexander Shurygin. Portrait of Isaac Levitan (1889, Israel Museum)

In March 1890, Isaac Levitan made his first trip abroad. For two months he visited Germany, France, and Italy, where he painted several landscapes. Upon his return to Russia, he travelled with the artist Sofia Kuvshinnikova to the Volga River, where he spent the summer and fall. From 1887–1890, Levitan spent several months each year on the Volga, so that the 1890 trip was the fourth in a row. During this time he visited Plyos, Yuryevets and Kineshma and made a number of sketches and studies for the future painting "A Quiet Monastery" and other works. Travelling by steamer from Plyos to Yuryevets, Levitan also stopped in Reshma.

According to Sofia Prorokova, the author of Levitan's biography, "Yurievets attracted the artist's sympathies," and especially "he was fascinated by a convent located in the forest on the opposite bank of the great Krivoye Lake". This was the Krivoyezersky Monastery, known simultaneously under the names Krivoozersky and Krivoyezersky, and also as the Krivoyezersky Trinitarian Desert. The monastery was located on the orographic left bank of the Volga River, at the confluence of the Unzha River into it. Built on sand hills, the monastery was surrounded on three sides by lakes.

Sophia Kuvshinnikova said, comparing with earlier impressions of the view of Savvino-Storozhevsky Monastery near Zvenigorod: "Levitan went from Plyos to Yurievets, hoping to find new motifs there, and wandering through the neighborhood, suddenly came across a monastery hidden in a grove. It was ugly and even unpleasant in colors, but it was the same evening as in Savvina: dull lava, thrown over the river, connected the quiet cloister with the stormy sea of life, and in Levitan's head suddenly arose one of his best paintings, which merged and Savva experiences, and newly seen, and hundreds of other memories".

After a trip to Yurievets Levitan and Kuvshinnikova returned to Plyos, where they lived in the house Chastukhin-Filosofova. Apparently, here Levitan worked on the sketch of "Quiet Abode" and, perhaps, began work on the painting itself, completing it near the end of the year in Moscow. Beginning in November 1889, the artist had the opportunity to work in a workshop house in Bolshoy Trisvyatitelsky Lane, allocated to him by entrepreneur and philanthropist Sergei Morozov.

=== The 19th Travelling Exhibition and sale of the painting ===
The painting "A Quiet Monastery" was completed shortly after Levitan's return from his trip to the Volga and was a great success at the 19th Exhibition of the Association of Travelling Art Exhibitions, which opened in St. Petersburg on 9 March 1891, (Note: To date events that took place in the Russian Empire, the Julian calendar ("old style") is used.) and moved to Moscow in April of the same year. The St. Petersburg part of the exhibition was held in the building of the Imperial Society for the Encouragement of the Arts, and the Moscow part – in the premises of the Moscow School of Painting, Sculpture and Architecture. Two other works by Levitan — "The Old Courtyard" (or "Old Courtyard. Plyos", 1888–1890, now in the State Tretyakov Gallery) and "Borghetto (in Italy)" (Note: In the catalog of the 19th Travelling Exhibition, reprinted in the book "The Association of Travelling Art Exhibitions. Letters, Documents. 1869–1899", – Bargetto; in the list of Levitan's works in the collection "Isaak Ilyich Levitan. Documents, Materials, Bibliography" (1966), – Borghetto.) (location unknown) were also presented at the exhibition. The painting "A Quiet Monastery" made a great impression on the visitors to the exhibition, one of whom, the doctor and publicist Solomon Vermel, recalled at the beginning of the XX century: "...I see it before my eyes as now, as now I remember the blissful mood, the sweet peace of mind, which caused me this quiet corner, isolated from the world and all the "hypocritical daily affairs and all the vulgarity and prose of life".

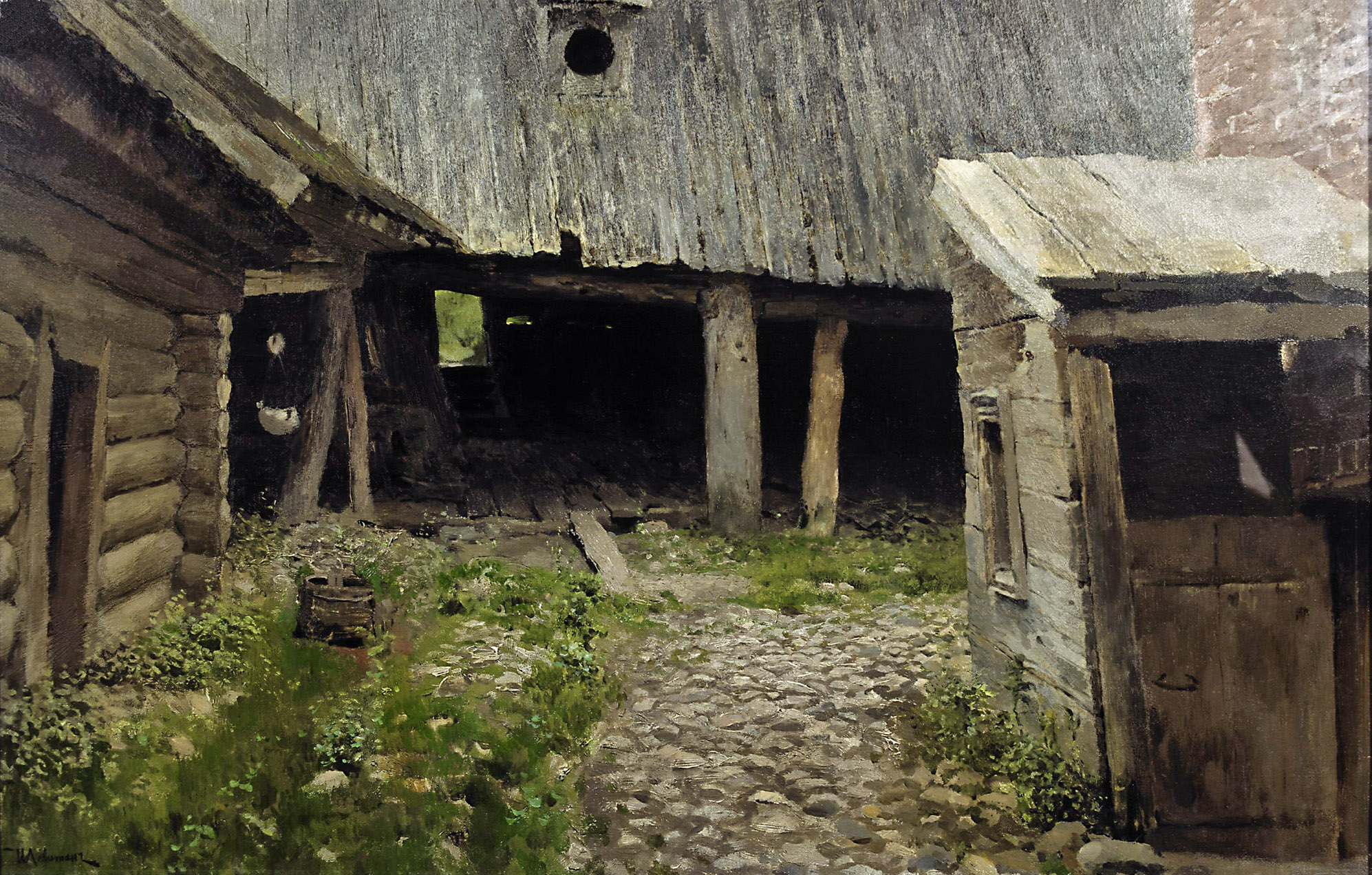
Isaac Levitan. Old Courtyard. Plyos (1888–1890, State Tretyakov Gallery)

The exhibition was accompanied by articles by writers and critics Aleksei Suvorin (Novoe Vremya), Vladimir Stasov (Severny Vestnik), Alexander Lvovich-Kostritsa (Sever), Vladimir Chuiko (Vsemirnaya Illyustratsiya), Leonid Obolensky (in "Russkoye Bogatstvo"), Nikolai Alexandrov (in "Novosti dnya"), Vladimir Sizov and Ippolit Bukva-Vasilevsky (both in "Russkiye Vedomosti"), in which Levitan's "A Quiet Monastery" was highly praised. There were also more critical reviews: for example, the writer Mitrofan Remezov (the magazine "Russian Mind"), who praised "The Old Courtyard" and "Borghetto (in Italy)", did not include "A Quiet Monastery" among the landscapes he liked best at the exhibition, and Pyotr Gnedich (the newspaper "Sankt-Peterburgskie Vedomosti") wrote that, in his opinion, the painting "A Quiet Monastery" was "weak in technique, but strong in mood".

Anton Chekhov wrote about Levitan's success in a letter to his sister Maria on 16 March 1891: "I was at the Travelling Exhibition. Levitan is celebrating the birthday of his wonderful muse. His painting is causing a sensation. <...> In any case, Levitan's success is not ordinary". In the same letter Chekhov describes the reaction of other writers and poets who visited the exhibition. According to him, Dmitry Grigorovich was delighted with Levitanovskogo landscape, Yakov Polonsky found that "the bridge is too long", and Alexei Plesheyev noted "the discord between the name of the painting and its content: "Excuse me, calls it a quiet place, and everything looks so cheerful here..." Later, Chekhov used the image of the painting "Quiet Place" in his story "Three Years" (1894), whose heroine, Yulia, contemplates the landscape at the exhibition: "In the foreground, a river, across it a wooden bridge, on the other side of the path, disappearing into the dark grass. <...> And in the distance the dusk is fading. <...> And for some reason it suddenly seemed to her that these very clouds, <...> and the forest and the field, which she had seen long ago and many times, <...> and she wanted to go, go, and walk on the path, and where there was an evening dawn, there rested the reflection of something unearthly, eternal".

As a result of the success of "A Quiet Monastery" at the Peredvizhniki exhibition, Levitan was finally recognized as one of the leading Russian landscape painters. His paintings were readily exhibited and bought at good prices, which greatly improved the artist's financial situation. Levitan, who had previously been an exhibitor at the Society for Travelling Art Exhibitions, became a full member in March 1891 – 14 of the 18 members of the society present at the meeting voted for his election.

Pavel Tretyakov bought for his collection only "Old Courtyard", for some reason not interested in "A Quiet Monastery". In 1891, directly from the exhibition of the Peredvizhniki, "A Quiet Monastery" was bought from the author by a certain Alfyorov from St. Petersburg: in the catalog of the State Tretyakov Gallery his surname is given without initials. Apparently, Levitan himself did not know the name and patronymic of the buyer, because in May 1891, in a letter to the artist Egor (George) Khruslov, he wrote: "The name and patronymic of Mr. Alferov are as unknown to me as they are to you, and therefore I am sending him the picture without specifying the name. The painting was sold for 600 rubles, about which I have already told Lemokh. The address of the mentioned Alferov is correct, i.e. Nikolaevskaya, 8, square 4". According to the St. Petersburg address book, in the 1890s the house at 8 Nikolaevskaya Street (now — Marat Street) belonged to the merchant of the 1st guild and founder of the bank office Fyodor Alexandrovich Alfyorov (1839 — not earlier than 1917), who, apparently, was the buyer of the painting.

=== Following events ===
Subsequently, the painting "A Quiet Monastery" came into the collection of the conductor and composer Nikolai Golovanov (1891–1953), who was the chief conductor of the Bolshoi Theater in the late 1940s and early 1950s. Golovanov greatly appreciated this painting and noted it in the catalog of his paintings with the Latin term "unicum". (Note: Unicus, a, um – from Latin – "one of a kind", "exceptional", "extraordinary".) After Golovanov's death in 1953, his collection remained with his sister Olga Semyonovna. Art historians probably did not know who had the painting after Alfyorov, as a 1956 publication stated that its "whereabouts are unknown". It was "found" again in preparation for the exhibition held in the Tretyakov Gallery in 1960 and dedicated to the 100th anniversary of Levitan's birth, but the painting was not exhibited at the exhibition because the consent of its owners had not been obtained. Golovanov's sister died in 1969. After that, the Nikolai Golovanov Apartment Museum (now part of the Russian National Museum of Music) was established, where part of his collection remained, and some paintings were transferred to art museums. In particular, Levitan's "A Quiet Monastery" and Nikolai Ge's "Portrait of V. A. Kochubey" were transferred to the Tretyakov Gallery in 1970.

After that, the painting "A Quiet Monastery" was exhibited at a number of exhibitions in the USSR and Russia, as well as in other countries of Europe, Asia, North America and Australia. In 1971–1972 the canvas took part in the exhibition "Landscape Painting of the Peredvizhniki" (Kyiv, Leningrad, Minsk, Moscow). In 1975–1976 it was exhibited at the exhibition "Masterpieces of Landscape Painting from the Museums of the USSR" in London and Glasgow, in 1976 — at the exhibition "Masterpieces of Russian and Soviet Painting" organized in Tokyo, in 1978 — at the exhibition "Realism and Poetry in Russian Painting" in Paris, in 1979–1980 — at the exhibitions of paintings from the museums of the USSR in Melbourne and Sydney, in 1984–1985 — at the exhibitions of Russian and Soviet art in Düsseldorf, Stuttgart, and Hanover, in 1986–1987 – at the exhibition of works from the collections of the State Tretyakov Gallery and the State Russian Museum of Art in Washington, D.C., Chicago, Boston and Los Angeles, in 1988–1989 — at the exhibition "1000th Anniversary of the Russian Art Culture" in Moscow, Hannover and Baden In 1990 — at the exhibition of works of Russian artists in Kasama and Sapporo, and in 1998–1999 – at the exhibition "Russian Art of the Second Half of the XIX Century from the Collection of the State Tretyakov Gallery" in Tula.

The painting "A Quiet Monastery" was also among the exhibits of the commemorative exhibition dedicated to the 150th anniversary of Levitan's birth, which was held from October 2010 to March 2011 in the New Tretyakovka in Krymsky Val. During the exhibition a sociological opinion poll was conducted among the visitors. According to the results of this survey, "A Quiet Monastery" was ranked fourth among the artist's favorite works, ahead of the paintings "By the Pool" (1892, State Tretyakov Gallery), "Over the Eternal Peace" (1894, State Tretyakov Gallery) and "March" (1895, State Tretyakov Gallery). In addition, from April 29 to September 26, 2021, the painting was exhibited in the museum and exhibition complex "Present Places" of the Plyos State Museum-Reserve as part of the thematic project "I. Levitan. Silent Abode".

== Plot and composition ==
In the foreground of the painting is a river with a small wooden lava bridge across it. On the other side of the river, the bridge turns into a path leading into a forest, in the depths of which the white churches' cupolas can be seen. The composition is built so that "the lavas really draw the viewer's eye into the depths, as if inviting him to walk along them there, to the monastery beyond the river "to the 'quiet monastery' secluded from the mundane world". In the sky there are golden evening clouds, among whose shades there are not only yellows but also violets. The buildings of churches and bell towers rise above the trees, and their reflections are visible on the calm surface of the river — "a large space of calm water with a barely fluctuating reflection of the distant shore and its buildings, which strengthen the feeling of evening silence and peace".

The subject of the painting combines the artist's impressions of several monasteries. The original idea for the painting apparently came in 1887, when Levitan observed the sunset over the Savvino-Storozhevsky Monastery near Zvenigorod. In addition, Levitan used the image of the Krivoyezersky Monastery near Yuryevets on the Volga, where he traveled from Plyos, to paint the picture. This monastery, for which the names Krivoozersky and Krivozersky are also found, was closed after 1917, and in the mid-1950s fell into the flood zone of the Gorky Reservoir.

The painting also depicts a tent-like bell tower (with a conical top). The writer Sofia Prorokova claimed that the artist found the prototype of this bell tower on Sobornaya Hill in Plyos, where the Cathedral of the Dormition of the Theotokos is located. Art historian Aleksei Fedorov-Davydov, commenting on Prorokova's statement, discussed and alternative option, believing that as a prototype the artist could use the bell tower of one of the churches in the village of Reshma (located on the Volga between Kineshma and Yuryevets), because in Levitan's album was a drawing with a picture of this church. The local historian Nikolai Zontikov states that Levitan's drawing shows the Church of the Nativity of Christ of Reshma (or the Church of the Nativity of Christ), which was characterized by a high bell tower (in 1932 the church was closed, and in 1964 the bell tower was destroyed). The local historian Leonid Smirnov, who analyzes Fedorov-Davydov's arguments in detail, agrees with Prorokova. He believes that Levitan most likely used the image of the bell tower on Sobornaya Gora in Plyos. One of the arguments in favor of this is that the neighboring building depicted in the painting also has an architecture similar to the church in Plyos.

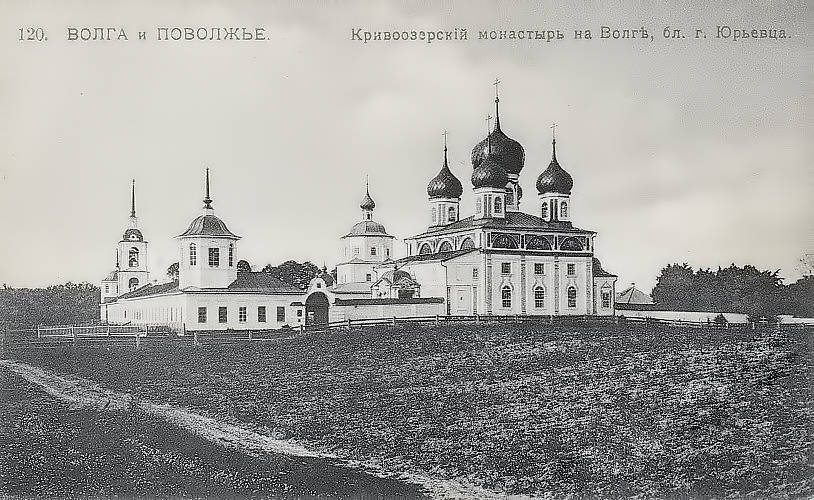
Krivoyezersky Monastery (photo by M. P. Dmitriev, 1913)

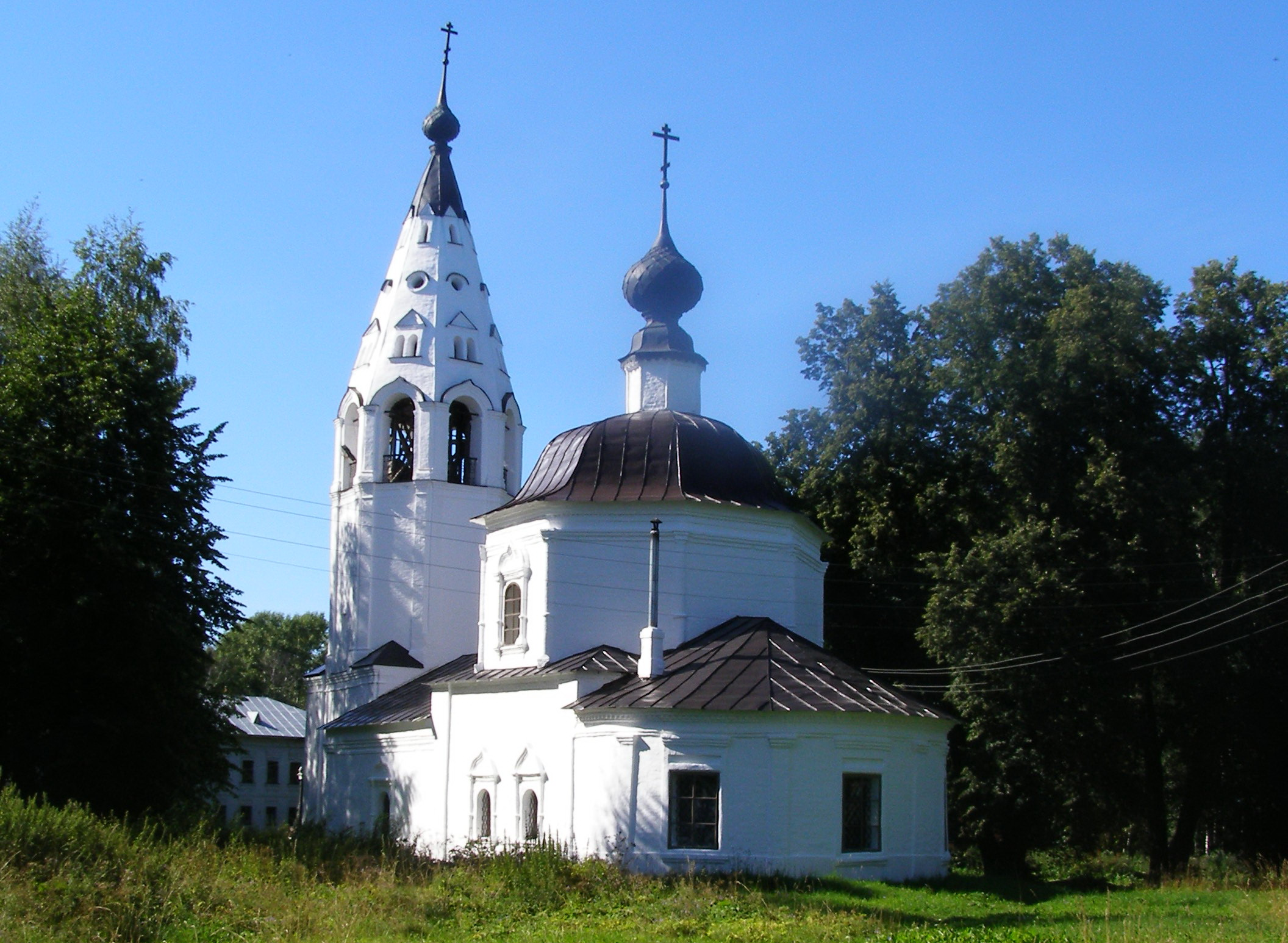
Winter church of the Assumption Cathedral in Plyos (photo 2007)

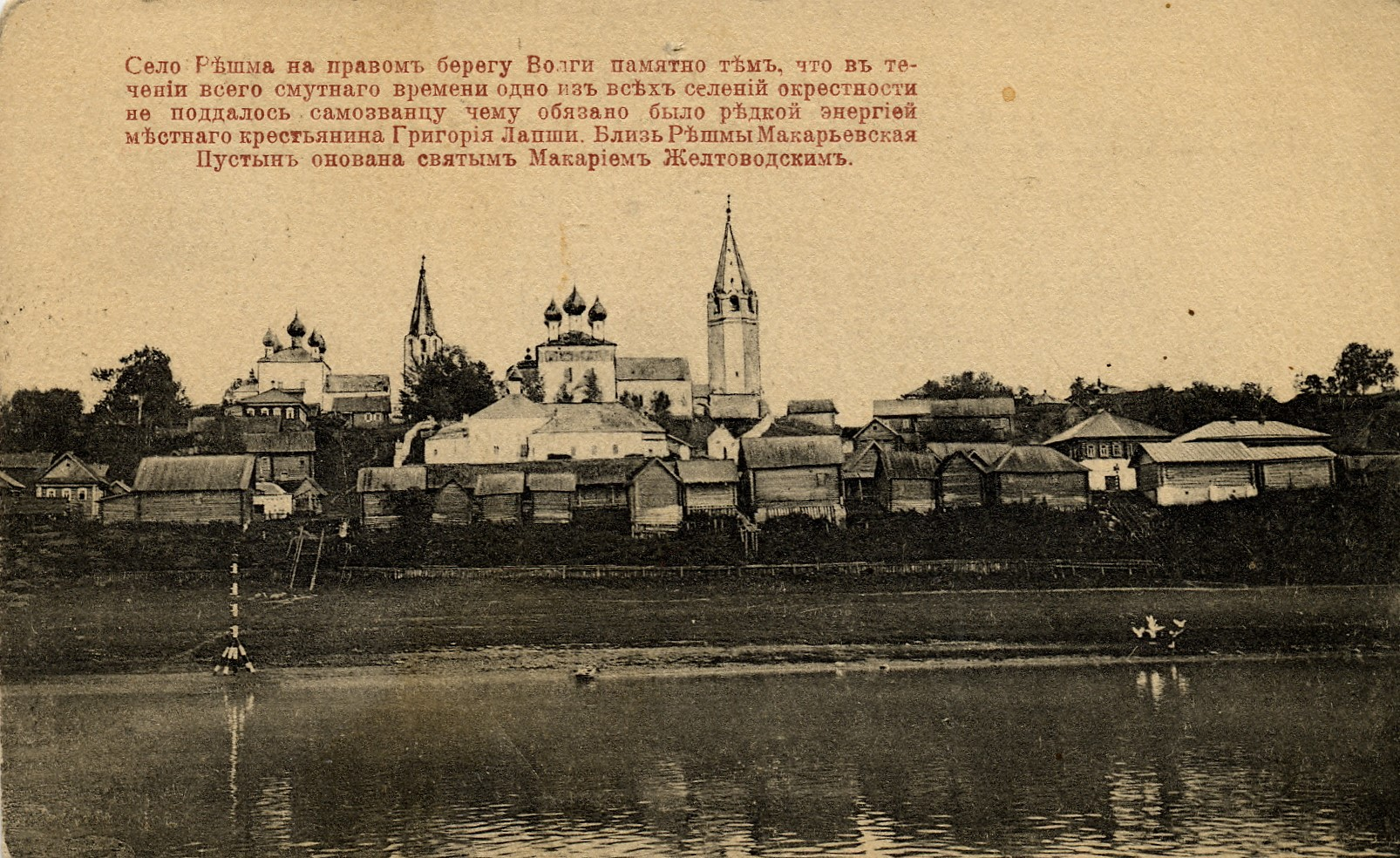
View of Reshma (photo by V. I. Breev, c. 1904-1909), with the Church of the Nativity in the center.

Two years after the painting of "A Quiet Monastery", Levitan depicted a very similar monastery in the painting "Evening Bells" (1892), also in the State Tretyakov Gallery. Art historian Dmitry Sarabianov, comparing the two paintings, wrote that "A Quiet Monastery" is simpler and "can be interpreted as a sketch for the second, although it is complete in itself". If in "A Quiet Monastery" the artist only partially departed from the natural image, replacing the bell tower in the monastery ensemble and slightly modifying the first plan, then in "Evening Bells" the landscape surrounding the monastery has undergone more significant changes, according to Alexei Fedorov-Davydov, in 1892 Levitan made a decisive step in the direction of "composed" landscape: "This is his first landscape that did not exist as such in nature".

== Sketches and studies ==
In 1890 Levitan made a small study for the future painting "A Quiet Monastery" (wood, oil, 9.6 × 16.5 cm, private collection; according to the information for 1966 it was in the collection of the Moscow collector N. A. Sokolov, earlier in the collection of A. V. Gordon). According to the art historian Alexei Fedorov-Davydov, this study from life shows "Levitan's desire to convey the golden light that floods the grove and especially the buildings of the monastery". The art historian Faina Maltseva noted that in this study "the colors of nature were subtly captured in the soft light of the evening sun"; in her opinion, it became "the basis of the coloristic structure of the painting".

A pictorial study and graphic sketches and sketches for the painting &amp;amp;amp;amp;amp;amp;amp;amp;amp;amp;quot;A Quiet Monastery&amp;amp;amp;amp;amp;amp;amp;amp;amp;amp;quot;

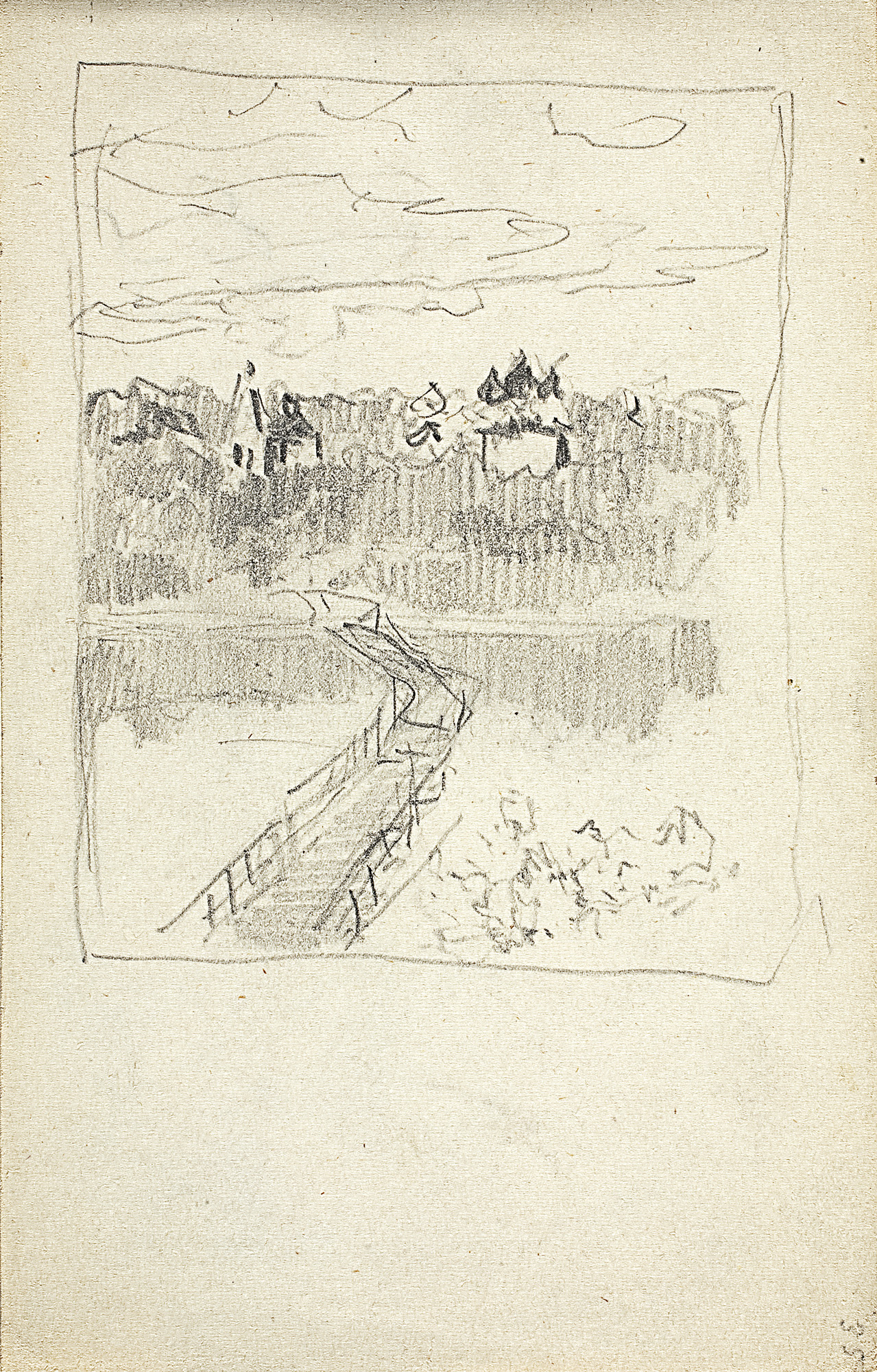
A Quiet Monastery (graphic sketch, State Tretyakov Gallery)

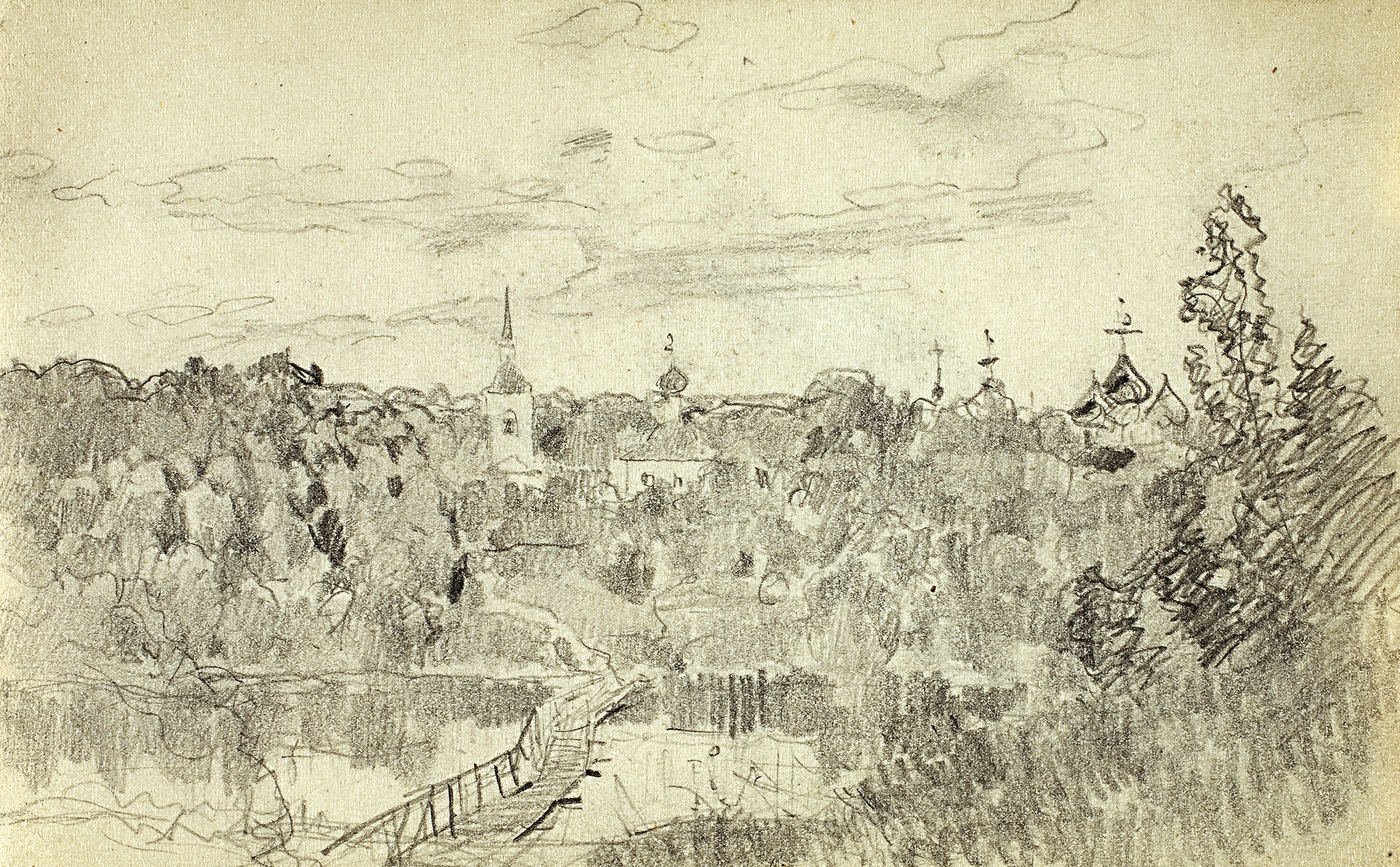
A Quiet Monastery (graphic sketch, State Tretyakov Gallery)

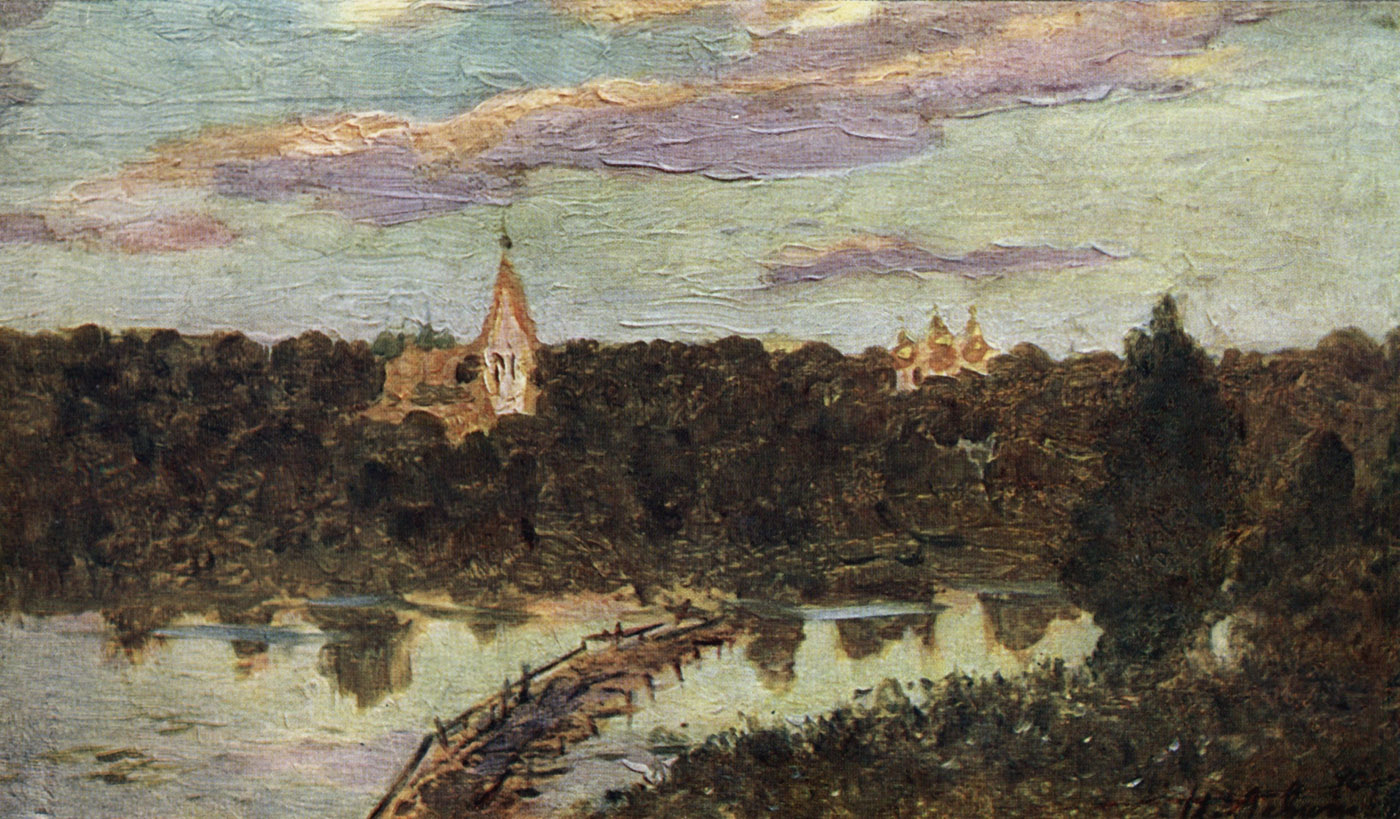
A Quiet Monastery (sketch, wood, oil, 1890, private collection)

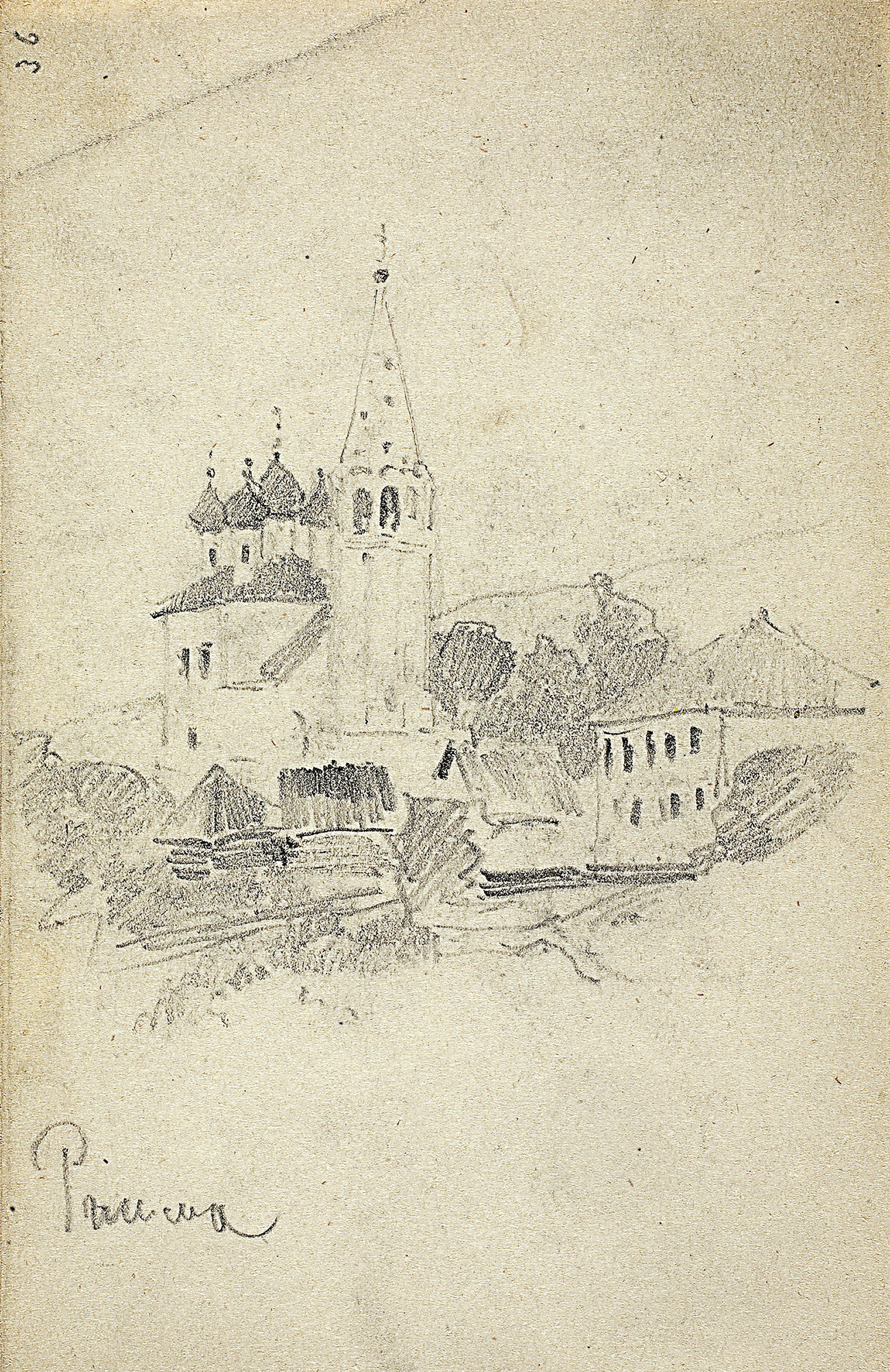
Church with Bell Tower in Reshma (State Tretyakov Gallery)

A number of pencil sketches and studies for the painting are included in Levitan's album of sketches from 1890–1895, which is kept in the State Tretyakov Gallery (inv. 25233). Among the drawings from this album, executed in graphite pencil on paper, is a sketch of the painting "Silent Abode" in horizontal format (15.8 × 9.8 cm, inv. 25233/34 ob.) and another sketch in vertical format (15.8 × 9.8 cm, inv. 25233/35). According to Alexei Fedorov-Davydov, "being to some extent a representation of nature, they at the same time already contain elements of the composition of the future painting, and the composition of the horizontal drawing is very close to the final version". The album also contains the drawings "A high river bank with a boat and an outlined bridge" (9.8 × 15.8 cm, inv. no. 25233/20), "High river bank with an outlined bridge" (9.8 × 15.8 cm, inv. 25233/33 ob.), "Bridge" (9.8 × 15.8 cm, inv. no. 25233/34), "Monks Swimming for Fish" (9.8 × 15.8 cm, inv. no. 25233/24), "Monastery with a five-domed church" (9,8 × 15,8 cm, inventory no. 25233/1), "View of the Krivoozersky Monastery" (9,8 × 15,8 cm, inventory no. 25233/23 ob.) 25233/23 ob.), "Krivoozersky Monastery" (on two sheets, 9,8 × 31,6 cm, inv. 25233/31 ob. – 32) and others. In the same album is the drawing "The Church with a Bell Tower in Reshma" (1890, 15.8 × 9.8 cm, inv. 25233/36), which depicts the Church of the Nativity of Christ.

Graphic sketches for the painting &amp;amp;amp;amp;amp;amp;amp;amp;quot;A Quiet Monastery&amp;amp;amp;amp;amp;amp;amp;amp;quot;

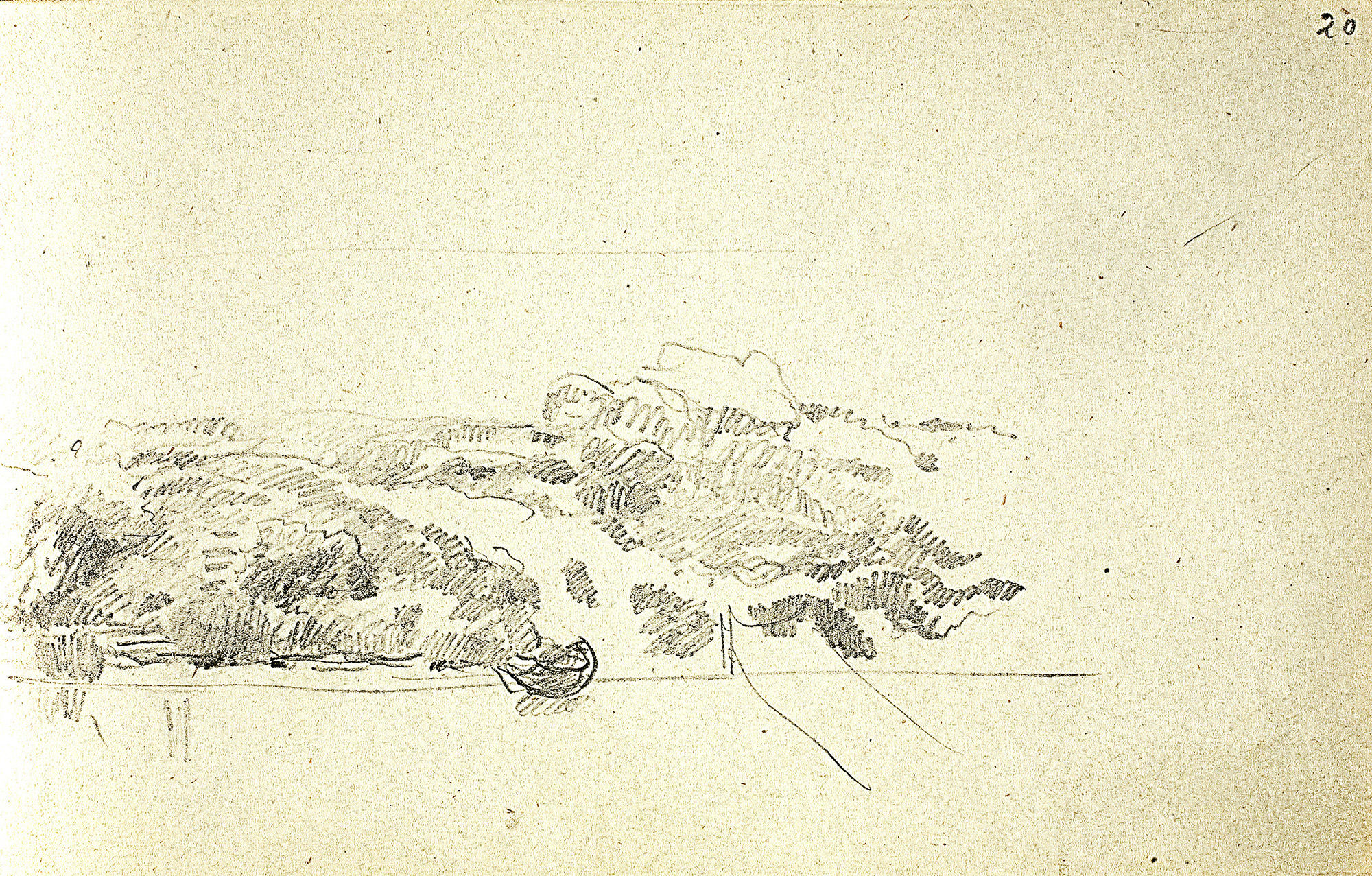
High river bank with a boat and an outlined bridge

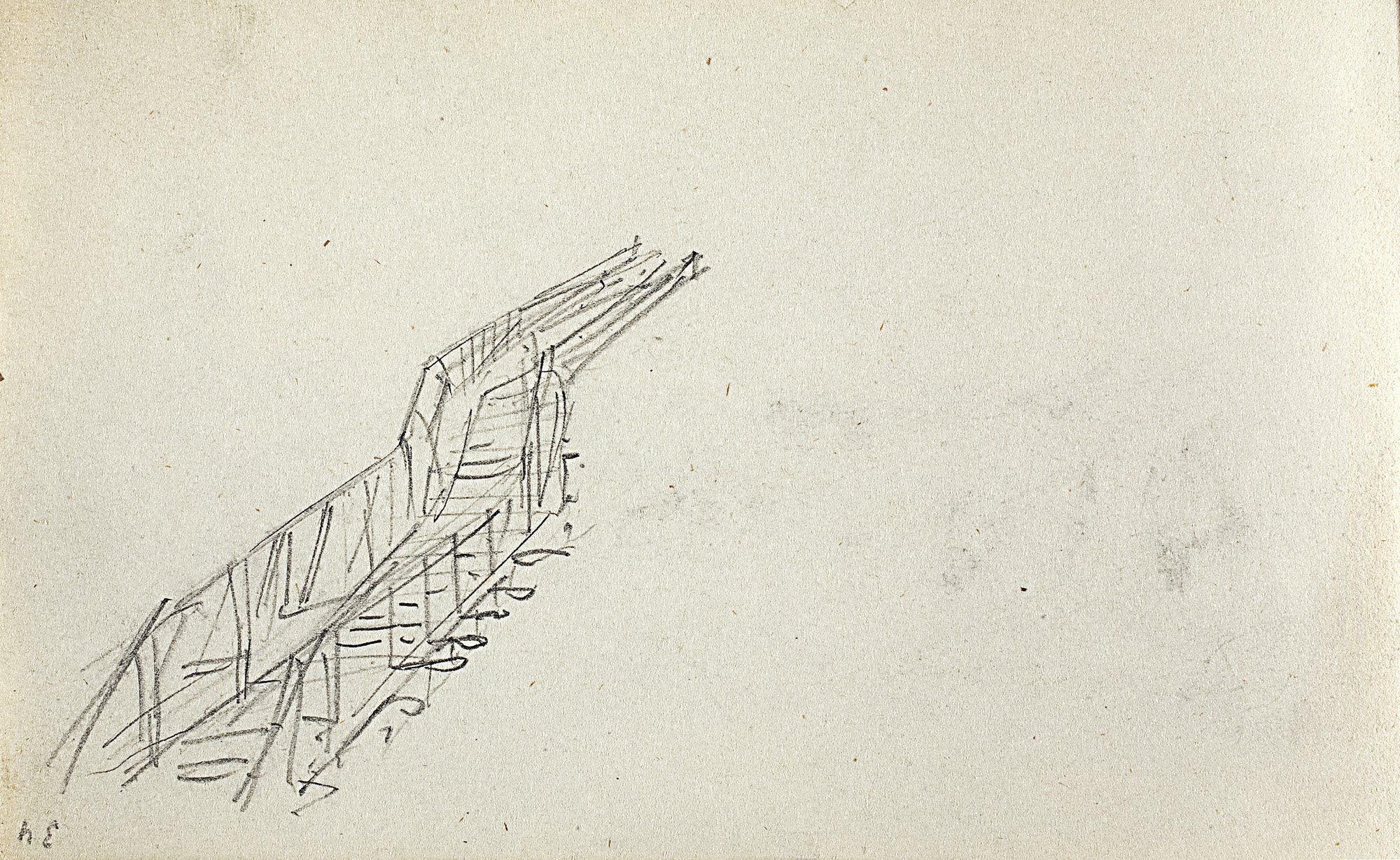
Bridge

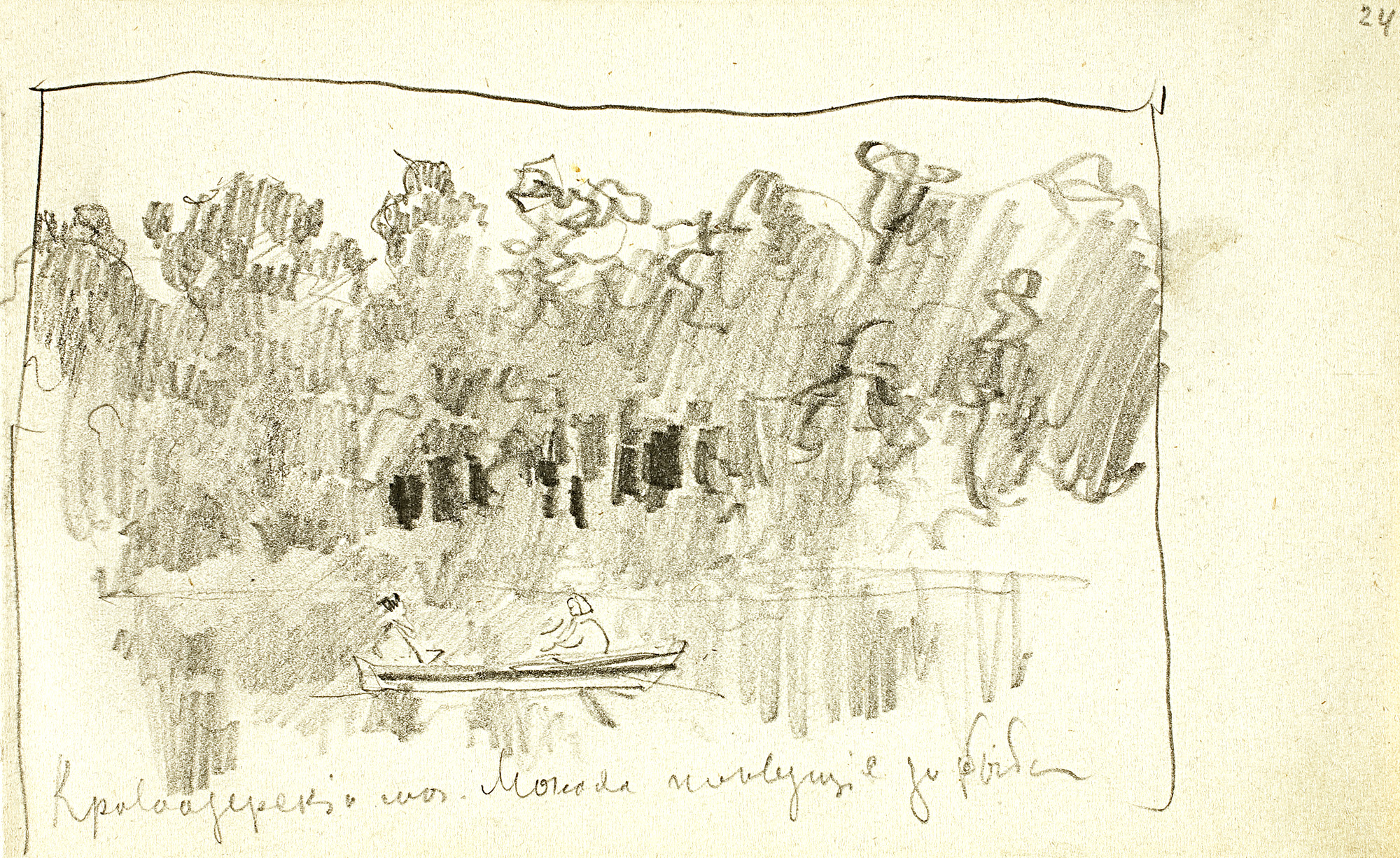
Monks swimming for fish

== Reviews and critics ==
=== 19th century ===
The art critic Vladimir Stasov, who had "hitherto ignored Levitan", praised this landscape in his review of the 19th traveling exhibition, published in the journal "Severny Vestnik" (April 1891 issue), writing that "A Quiet Monastery" was, in his opinion, "his [Levitan's] best painting in the beauty and poetry of the tones of the evening sun". The painter Vasily Polenov, who also visited the exhibition in St. Petersburg, noted in a letter to his wife on 4 March 1891, that in the painting everyone likes the top, but the water is not quite successful, too cutting". The artist Igor Grabar, in a letter to his brother Vladimir dated 10 March 1891, wrote that Levitan had surpassed all the landscape painters at the traveling exhibition and that he had not seen "such a pleasant combination of colors, light, poetry" as in the painting "Quiet Abode", according to Grabar, what Levitan wrote, "positively beyond any comparison".

The writer and critic Aleksei Suvorin in an article published in the newspaper "Novoe Vremya" (issue No. 5400 of 12 March 1891) wrote that Levitan's landscape "A Quiet Monastery" is "full of freshness and poetry". According to Suvorin, despite the apparent simplicity and lack of details and the fact that "this grove and the monastery above it have been seen by everyone in Russia thousands of times", "how inexplicably beautiful is revealed over this peaceful corner of the Russian land quiet, transparent quiet morning! Other authors, however, noted that the painting depicts the evening, not the dawn. The "poetic mood of the artist" expressed in this canvas, also noted the art critic Vladimir Sizov, who published an article in the newspaper "Russkie Vedomosti" (issue No. 126 of 10 May 1891). According to him, "the brilliant range of tones contributes to the strength and effect of the depicted landscape".

In an article published in the journal Russian Wealth (April 1891 issue), the writer and critic Leonid Obolensky paid special attention to Vasily Polenov's "Early Snow", Isaac Levitan's "A Quiet Monastery," Yefim Volkov's "The Yugas," and Ivan Shishkin's "Forest Glade" and "Pine" ("On the Wild North") among the landscapes presented at the 19th Travelling Exhibition. According to Obolensky (who, like Suvorin, believed that Levitan's canvas depicted morning, not evening), "A Quiet Monastery" "so truthfully conveys our local, northern color of morning light, a special, cold and damp, pinkish-golden" that the viewer has the impression that he is not standing in front of the picture, but actually sees "this river, and this damp grass and these damp trees, and pink clouds, and the shining pale blue sky".

In an article published in the journal "Russian Mind" (May 1891 issue), the writer Mitrofan Remezov criticized the painting "A Quiet Monastery", not including it among the landscapes he liked best of those shown at the 19th Travelling Exhibition, but praising two other Levitan works: "Old Courtyard" and "Borghetto (in Italy)". In Remezov's opinion, "A Quiet Monastery" could have been one of the best landscapes of the exhibition "if the artist had not been carried away by the too bright reflection of the churches and the forest in the river"; according to him, "this repeated, inverted view decisively spoils the beautiful picture".

=== 20th and 21st centuries ===
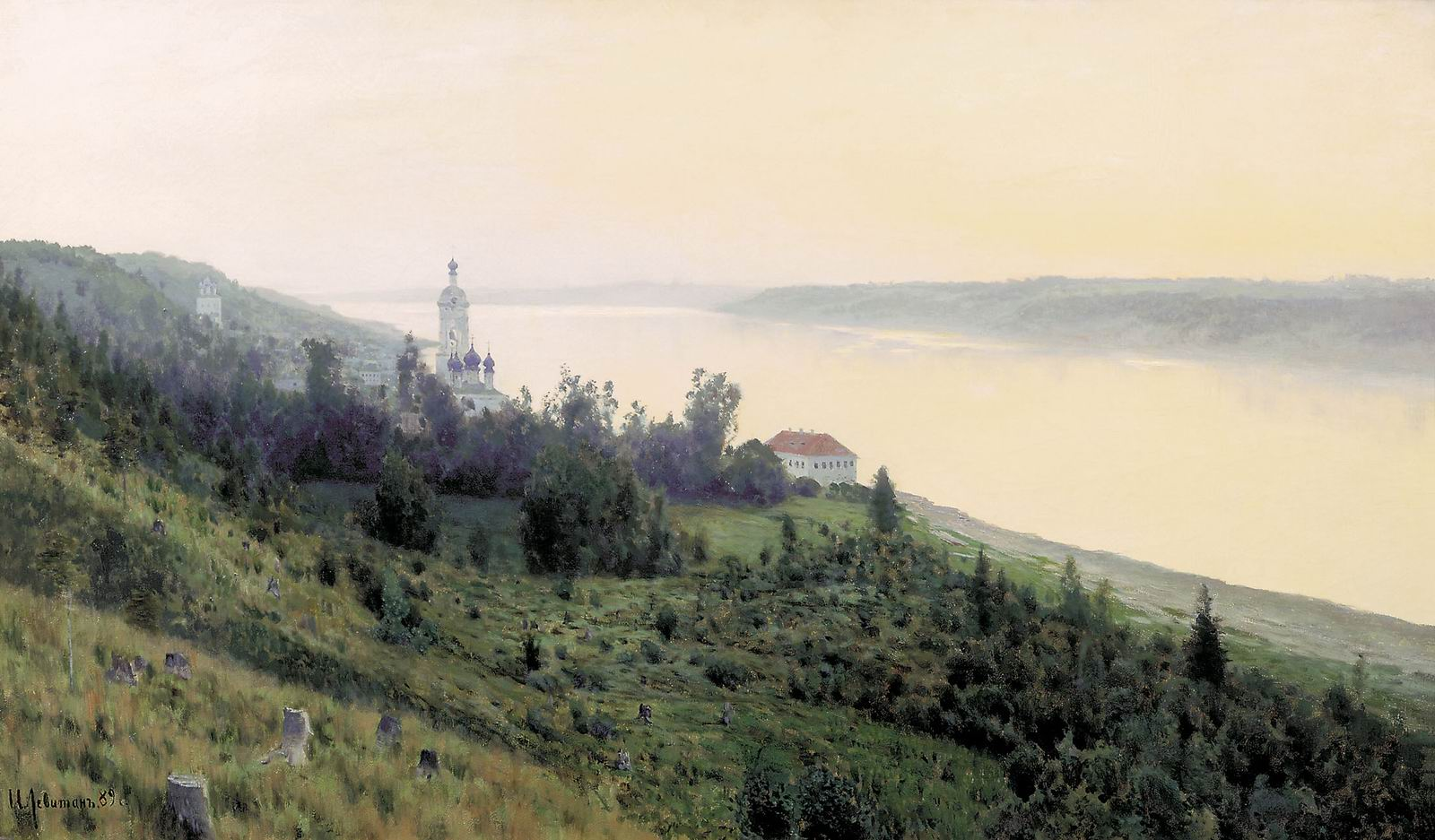
Isaac Levitan. Evening. Golden Plyos (1889, canvas, oil, 84.2 × 142 cm, State Tretyakov Gallery)

The artist and critic Alexander Benois wrote in his book "History of Russian Painting in the 19th Century": "It was at the Travelling Exhibition in 1891 when Levitan first attracted attention, although he had already been exhibiting his works for several years. According to Benois, in previous years Levitan "did not differ from our other landscape painters, from their general, gray and sluggish mass," but now "the appearance of" A Quiet Monastery" made, on the contrary, a surprisingly bright impression" — "it seemed as if one just removed the shutters from the windows, just opened them wide, and a jet of fresh, fragrant air rushed into the stale exhibition hall, which smelled so foul from the excessive number of tuluks and greasy boots. Benois noted that in this work, the artist "said a new word, sang a new song of wonder," which so enchanted the audience that long-familiar things "seemed unseen, just discovered," and "struck by its pristine, fresh poetry. According to Benois, it became clear that "here was not a 'randomly successful sketchbook,' but an image of the master, and that from now on this master would be one of the first among all".

Art historian Aleksei Fedorov-Davydov agreed with Benois's high assessment. However, he disagreed with Benois that the painting marked a particular turning point in the artist's work. Assigning "A Quiet Monastery" to a series of Levitan's "mood landscapes", Fedorov-Davydov noted that this painting "was a kind of final stage of his many years of work on the Volga," and that it "not only does not contradict Levitan's previous work, but follows naturally from it. At the same time, according to Fedorov-Davydov, "A Quiet Monastery" not only completes the Volga cycle of the artist's works, but also "begins the new one that marked the first half of the 1890s".

According to art historian Gleb Pospelov, "A Quiet Monastery" is one of the most important paintings representing the idea of "refuge" in the landscape work of Russian artists of the late 19th century, and "refuge" means "protected from tempests, a peaceful country where the human soul not only thaws but blossoms". In addition to "A Quiet Monastery", Pospelov also referred to this theme in Levitan's later painting "Evening Bells" (1892, State Tretyakov Gallery), and "as its immediate predecessor" cited the painting "Evening. Golden Plyos" (1889, State Tretyakov Gallery). At the same time, the motif of "refuge" also included "a sense of the path that must be overcome to reach the shelter visible in the depths": in particular, in "A Quiet Monastery", "before reaching the monastery hidden behind the forest", the viewer's eye had to pass through "hovering over the river wooden lava".

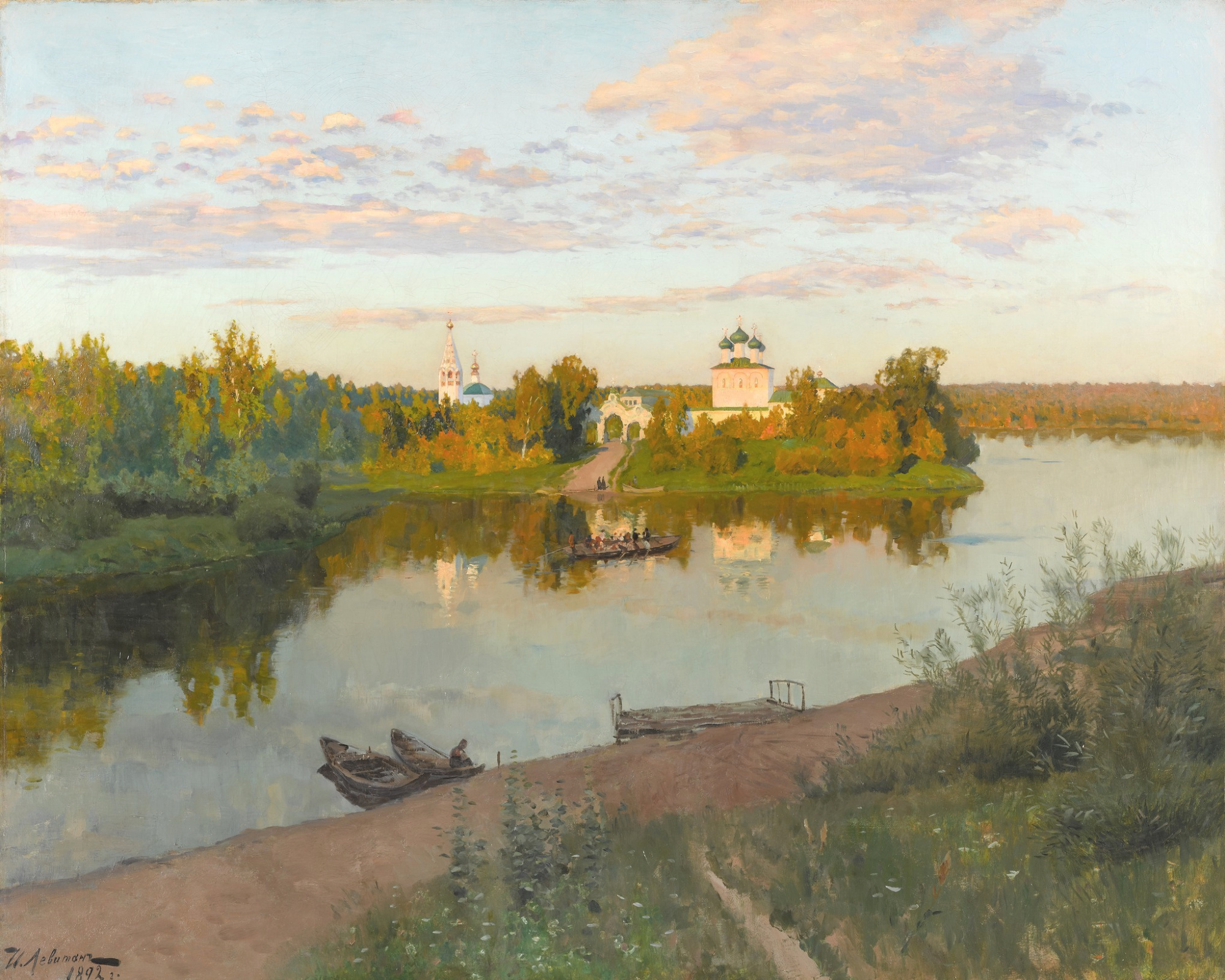
Isaac Levitan. Evening Bells (1892, canvas, oil, 87 × 107.6 cm, State Tretyakov Gallery)

Art historian Faina Maltseva also noted the similarity in content of the landscapes "A Silent Monastery" and "Evening. Golden Plyos", as well as the fact that in both the other work "soft and harmonious warm golden color". Maltseva wrote that the image created by Levitan in "A Silent Monastery", "multifaceted in its content", creates in the soul "and a sense of peace, and quiet lyrical sadness, and rapturous admiration for the beauty of the summer evening". According to Maltseva, these qualities were the reason for the success of the canvas at the traveling exhibition – the artist's contemporaries were fascinated by "the extraordinary harmony of the picture and the versatility of its content".

Art historian Tatiana Kovalenskaya wrote that in "A Quiet Monastery" Levitan managed to convey with particular completeness the mood of landscapes from his "Volga series", on which he worked in 1887–1890 years. According to Kovalenskaya, "A Quiet Monastery", as well as its later version of "Evening Bells", perhaps most fully reveals "Levitanovskogo image of nature in its ability to its beauty and harmony to dispel the heavy impressions of life, dispel gloomy thoughts, revive faith in the existence of the beautiful, restore the balance of the spiritual world". According to Kovalenskaya, from this perspective, both paintings can be considered "programmatic" works in the artist's oeuvre.

The art historian Vladimir Kruglov, noting that Levitan's "classic painting A Quiet Monastery" is a kind of summary of his trips to the Upper Volga, wrote that such a theme did not appear in the artist's work by chance, as it was connected with his "delicate interest" in church services and the decoration of Orthodox churches. According to Kruglov, The Quiet Abode synthesized Levitan's impressions and reflections on the spiritual life of people and the Russian monasteries he had seen. According to Kruglov, this work by Levitan "echoes the images characteristic of Nesterov's painting and anticipates the best of them".

In his memoirs, the artist Aleksander Golovin wrote that during his studies at the Moscow School of Painting, Sculpture and Architecture (1882–1889), "Levitan was already considered a great talent," but "he drew special attention to himself when his 'A Quiet Monastery' appeared at the Travelling Exhibition. Golovin noted that "this picture was very simple in subject (summer morning, river, wooded cape, pink, dawn sky, distant monastery), but made an impression of remarkable freshness, sincerity, honesty. Golovin extended these qualities to the entire work of Levitan, who, in his opinion, "understood like no one else the delicate, transparent charm of Russian nature, its sad charm".

== See also ==
- List of paintings by Isaak Ilyich Levitan

== Bibliography ==
- Алпатов М. В. Левитан. — М.: Искусство, 1945. — 32 p. — (Массовая библиотека).
- Бенуа А. Н. История русской живописи в XIX веке. — М.: Республика, 1995. — 448 p. — ISBN 5-250-02524-2.
- Вермель С. С. Исаак Ильич Левитан и его творчество. — СПб.: Типо-литография А. Е. Ландау, 1902. — 25 p.
- Грабарь И. Э. Письма. 1891—1917 / Л. В. Андреева, Т. П. Каждан. — М.: Наука, 1974. — 472 p.
- Зонтиков Н. А. Макариево-Решемский монастырь: вехи истории. — Кинешма, 2019. — 880 p. — ISBN 978-5-342-00133-5.
- Иовлева Л. И. Малоизвестные произведения И. И. Левитана // Очерки по русскому и советскому искусству. — М.: Советский художник, 1965. — V. 4. — P. 161—170. — 227 p.
- Коваленская Т. М. Русский реализм и проблема идеала. — М.: Изобразительное искусство, 1983. — 304 p.
- Круглов В. Ф. Исаак Левитан. — М.: Арт-Родник, 2001. — 50 с. — (Золотая галерея русской живописи). — ISBN 5-88896-051-9.
- Круглов В. Ф. Исаак Ильич Левитан. — СПб.: Золотой век и Художник России, 2012. — 480 p. — (Русские художники. XIX век). — ISBN 978-5-342-00133-5.
- Левитан И. И. Письма, документы, воспоминания / А. А. Фёдоров-Давыдов. — М.: Искусство, 1956. — 335 p.
- Мальцева Ф. С. Мастера русского реалистического пейзажа. Issue 2. — М.: Искусство, 1959. — 400 p. — (Очерки по истории русской живописи второй половины XIX века).
- Мальцева Ф. С. И. И. Левитан и пейзажная живопись 1890–х годов // История русского искусства / И. Э. Грабарь, В. Н. Лазарев, А. А. Сидоров, О. А. Швидковский. — М.: Наука, 1968. — V. 10, book 1. — P. 108—178.
- Мальцева Ф. С. Мастера русского пейзажа. Вторая половина XIX века. Part 4. — М.: Искусство, 2002. — 84 p. — ISBN 978-5-210-01348-4.
- Оболенский Л. Е. (Созерцатель). Художественные выставки. Критические заметки // Русское богатство. — 1891. — No. 4. — P. 171—193.
- Петров В. А. Исаак Ильич Левитан. — СПб.: Художник России, 1992. — 200 p. — (Русские живописцы XIX века).
- Петров В. А. Исаак Левитан. — М.: Белый город, 2000. — (Мастера живописи). — ISBN 5-7793-0250-2.
- Петрунина Л. Я. Выставка И. И. Левитана глазами зрителей // Третьяковские чтения 2010—2011. — М.: Инико, 2012. — P. 606—618. — ISBN 978-5-89580-106-2.
- Поспелов Г. Г. Мотив «приюта» в искусстве конца XIX — начале XX века // Русское искусство XIX века. — М.: Искусство, 1997. — P. 255—261. — ISBN 5-210-00921-1.
- Пророкова С. А. Левитан. — М.: Молодая гвардия, 1960. — 240 p. — (Жизнь замечательных людей).
- Рахманова М. П. (2010). Николай Голованов: возвращение. Православие и современность. pp. 109–114. Archived from the original on 2015-09-24.
- Ремезов М. Н. (М. Анютин). Современное искусство. XIX передвижная выставка картин // Русская мысль. — 1891. — No. 5. — P. 186—193 (2-я пагинация).
- Рогинская Ф. С. Товарищество передвижных художественных выставок. — М.: Искусство, 1989. — 430 p..
- Сарабьянов Д. В. История русского искусства второй половины XIX века. — М.: Издательство Московского университета, 1989. — 381 p.
- Стасов В. В. Статьи и заметки, публиковавшиеся в газетах и не вошедшие в книжные издания. — М.: Издательство Академии художеств СССР, 1954. — V. 2.
- Турков А. М. Исаак Ильич Левитан. — М.: Искусство, 1974. — 160 p. — (Жизнь в искусстве).
- Фёдоров-Давыдов А. А. Исаак Ильич Левитан. Жизнь и творчество. — М.: Искусство, 1966. — 403 p.
- Фёдоров-Давыдов А. А. Русский пейзаж XVIII — начала XX века. — М.: Советский художник, 1986. — 304 p.
- Чехов А. П. Письма в 12 томах. — М.: Наука, 1965. — V. 4 (January 1890 — February 1892.). — 656 p. Archive: 6 March 2016.
- Чехов А. П. Полное собрание сочинений и писем в 30 томах. — М.: Наука, 1985. — V. 9 (Сочинения. 1894—1897). — 544 p. Archive: 6 March 2016.
- Чижмак М. С. Хроника жизни и творчества Исаака Левитана // Третьяковская галерея. — 2010. — No. 13. — P. 58—71. Archive: 2 April 2015.
- Чурак Г. С. «Художник чудный и гениальный» // Наше наследие. — 2010. — No. 95. — P. 30—43.
- Александр Яковлевич Головин. Встречи и впечатления. Письма. Воспоминания о Головине / А. Г. Мовшенсон. — Л.—М.: Искусство, 1960. — 388 p.
- Государственная Третьяковская галерея — каталог собрания / Я. В. Брук, Л. И. Иовлева. — М.: Красная площадь, 2001. — V. 4: Живопись второй половины XIX века, book 1, А—М. — 528 p. — ISBN 5-900743-56-X.
- Исаак Ильич Левитан. Документы, материалы, библиография / А. А. Фёдоров-Давыдов. — М.: Искусство, 1966. — 240 p.
- Православные русские обители. Полное иллюстрированное описание всех православных русских монастырей в Российской империи и на Афоне. — СПб.: Книгоиздательство П. П. Сойкина, 1909. — 712 p.
- Товарищество передвижных художественных выставок. Письма, документы. 1869—1899 / В. В. Андреева, М. В. Астафьева, С. Н. Гольдштейн, Н. Л. Приймак. — М.: Искусство, 1987. — 668 p.
