= Nablyudatel =

- Editor: Alexander Pyatkovsky
- Categories: Literary magazine Political magazine
- Frequency: Monthly
- Founded: 1882
- Final issue: 1904
- Based in: Saint Petersburg, Russian Empire
- Language: Russian

Nablyudatel (Russian: Наблюдатель, The Watcher) was a Russian monthly literary and political magazine published in Saint Petersburg in 1882–1904. Its editor and publisher was Alexander Pyatkovsky. There was a supplement to it, a daily newspaper called Glasnost (1897-1904). A right-wing, pro-monarchist publication, particularly harsh on what it perceived as being "Jewish interests", Nablyudatel was unpopular with both Marxist and liberal critics, but its literary and scientific sections were respectable, and among the authors whose works appeared there, were Vladimir Bezobrazov, Ieronim Yasinsky, Liodor Palmin, Pavel Zasodimsky, Pyotr Boborykin, Daniil Mordovtsev, Vasily Nemirovich-Danchenko, Konstantin Balmont, Nikolai Minsky and Konstantin Fofanov. It was the publication of latter's 1888 poem "The Mystery of Love" (Таинство любви) that brought the journal its biggest trouble with censorship, resulting in six months suspension.
