= Pavel Zasodimsky =

Russian writer

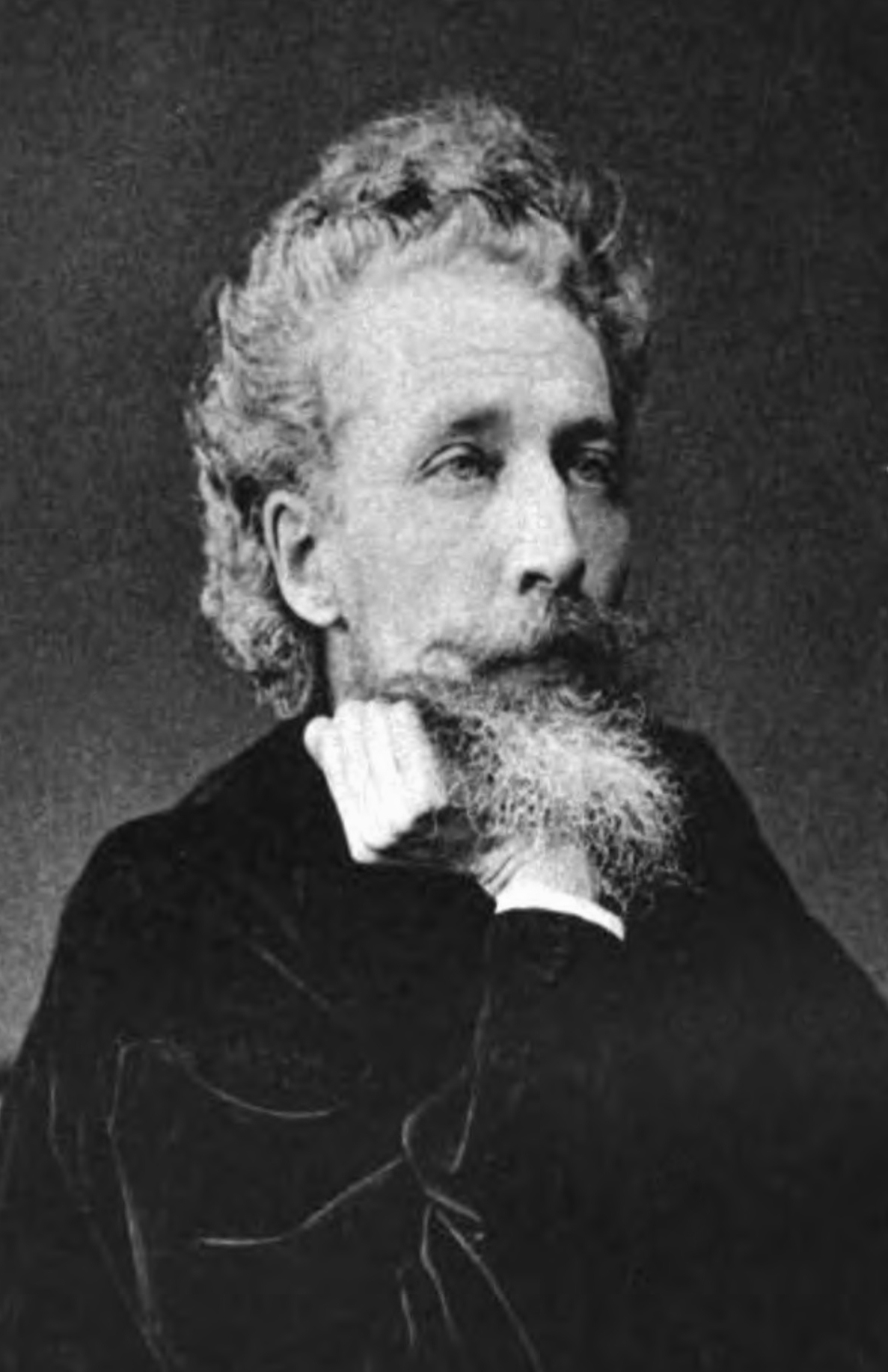
- Born: Pavel Vladimirovich Zasodimsky; 13 November 1843; Veliky Ustyug, Russian Empire
- Died: 17 May 1912 (aged 68); Novgorod Governorate, Russian Empire
- Occupation: writer

Pavel Vladimirovich Zasodimsky (Russian: Павел Владимирович Засодимский, born 13 November 1834, Veliky Ustyug, Vologda Governorate. Russian Empire, — died 17 May 1912, Opechensky Posad, Novgorod Governorate, Russian Empire) was a Russian writer, close to the Narodnik movement and Narodnaya Volya group. He was also known under his pen name Vologdin (Вологдин).

Writing mostly about the life of Russian lower classes, Zasodimsky contributed regularly to the leading Russian magazines, including Delo (where he started out in 1868), Otechestvennye Zapiski (The Chronicles of the Smurin Village, published there in 1874, was lauded by critics), and Russkoye Bogatstvo, which he became the member of the staff in 1880, the year when his another well-known novel, The Steppe Mysteries appeared in it. Several of his novellas were published by Nablyudatel, numerous essays and sketches appeared in Severny Vestnik, Novoye Vremya, Siyaniye and Russkaya Zhizn.

Zasodimsky was a popular children’s writer; his best-known stories appeared in two collections: Soulful Stories (Задушевные рассказы) and The True Stories and Fairytales (Бывальщина и сказки). He owned a huge library at Nevsky, 80, in Saint Petersburg which at some point Alexander Ertel was in charge of, and which was used as a meeting place for the members of Narodnaya Volya, which Zasodimsky was in close contact with.
