= Aleksei Fedorov-Davydov =

Russian Soviet art historian

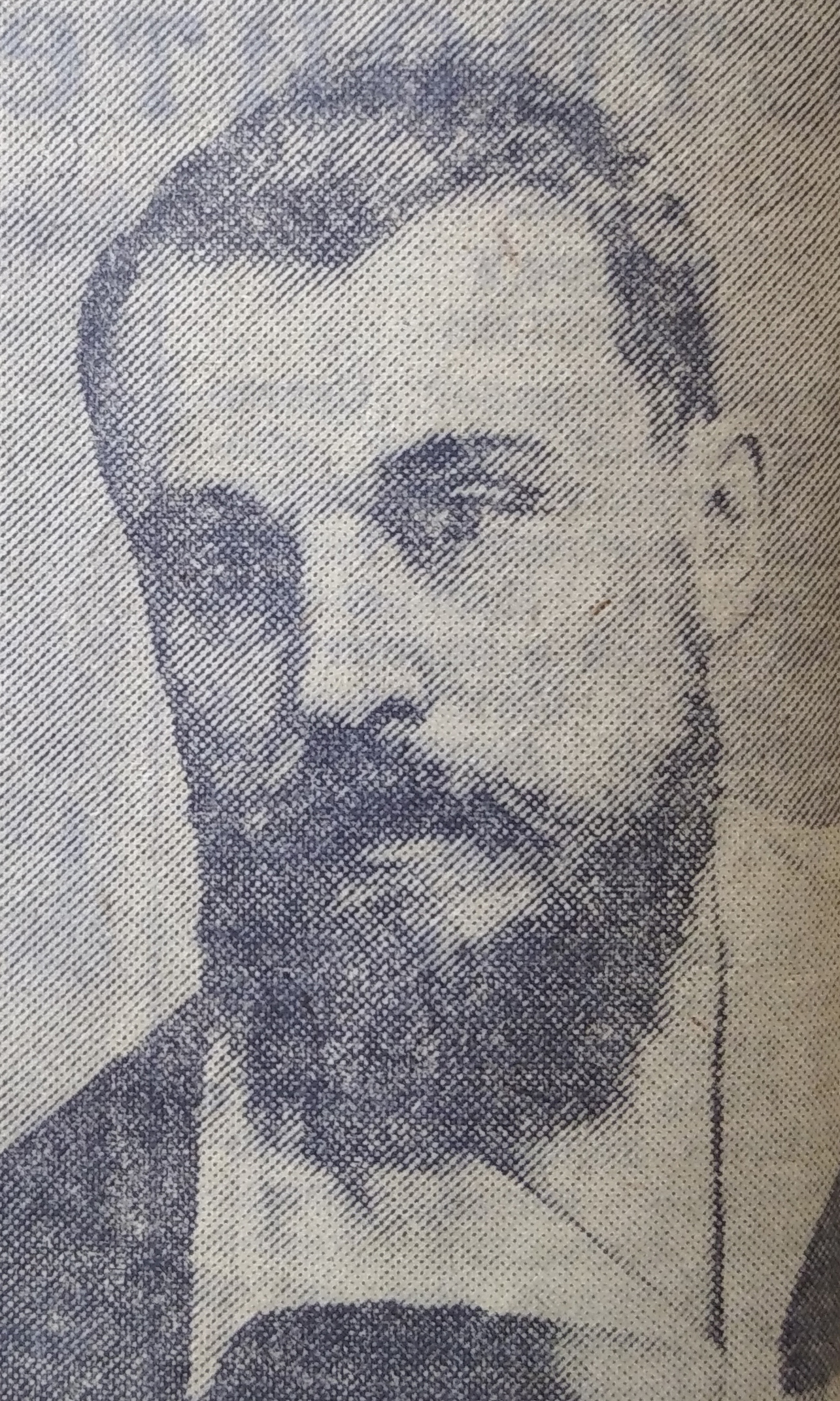
Fedorov-Davydov in 1939

Aleksei Aleksandrovich Fedorov-Davydov (Russian: Алексей Александрович Фёдоров-Давыдов; 18 March 1900 – 6 July 1969) was a Soviet art scholar and historian.

== Biography ==
Aleksei was born to Alexander Feodorov-Davydov, a writer of children's books and translator.

From 1919 to 1923 Fedorov-Davydov studied at Kazan University. Then from 1927 to 1931, he taught at the Moscow State University.

His 1929 article 'The Principles of Building Art Museums' criticized existing Soviet galleries and museums for their 'fetishism of objects'. He called for museum displays to concentrate on 'processes' rather than 'things':

The history of styles stretched into a single straight line of evolution... we know that this single line exists because every piece of the historical process is a complex intersection, a dialectical struggle between competing forces and heterogenous tendencies.

From 1929 to 1934, Feorov-Davydov worked at the State Tretyakov Gallery as head of the department of new Russian art. In 1931, he headed the art department of the second half of the 19th century. He transformed the department into the "Art Group of the Capitalist Era", which developed "a new historical concept of the exhibition with the involvement of Marxist historians in the context of the Marxist-Leninist history of Russian art." in 1933–1934, some concepts of the "vulgar sociological approach to art" were criticized, and in April 1934 Fedorov-Davydov was forced to stop his work at the Tretyakov Gallery.

From 1934 to 1944 he taught at the Moscow State Textile University and from 1935 he was a professor. Also from 1934 to 1937 he worked as the head of the research sector of Gerasimov Institute of Cinematography, and in 1943-1944 he was a professor at VGIK.

From 4, Fedorov-Davydov continued teaching at Moscow State University, where from 1948 he became the head of the Department of the History of Russian Art. In 1950, largely due to the efforts of Fedorov-Davydov, the art department was transferred from the philological department to the history department of Moscow State University. From 1960, the department, became known as the Department of the History of Russian and Soviet Art.

From 1948 to 1956, Alexei Fedorov-Davydov was also the head of the art theory and art history department at the Academy of Social Sciences under the Central Committee of the CPSU. He was a member of the Communist Party from 1946.

Alexei Fedorov-Davydov was buried at the Vvedenskoye Cemetery.

His son German Fedorov-Davydov was a Soviet archeologist and also a professor at the Moscow State University.
