= German Fyodorov-Davydov =

Russian/Soviet historian, archaeologist, numismatist and art historian

German Alexeyevich Fyodorov-Davydov (Герман Алексеевич Фёдоров-Давыдов; 17 July 1931 – 13 April 2000) was a Russian archaeologist and numismatist. He was a leading expert on the nomadic civilizations of the Middle Ages and their coinage. His excavations of the medieval towns on the banks of the Volga River (in its lower reaches) opened a new chapter in the study of the Golden Horde. He also excavated the Sarmatian and Bronze Age kurgans (mostly in the Astrakhan Oblast) and explored the remains of Old Urgench.

== Life and achievements ==
German Fedorov-Davydov was born in a family of highly educated, impoverished nobility, with old tradition of science; one of his ancestors was a rector of the Moscow University in the 19th century. His father Aleksei Fedorov-Davydov, was a Soviet art historian and university professor.

German Fedorov-Davydov graduated from the Moscow State University (historical division) in 1954 majoring in archeology. In 1969 he became a professor in the Archeology Institute of the USSR Academy of Science, his post-graduate and doctoral monographs were "Altyn Orda coin hoards" (1957), and "East European Nomads from 10th to 14th centuries" (1966). From 1960, he taught at the Moscow State University.

German Fedorov-Davydov was a field archeologist. From 1950 he constantly participated in archeological expeditions: to Khwarazm, Tatarstan, Chuvashia, Tunis, Mongolia, South Korea. From 1960 to 1990, Fedorov-Davydov headed the Volga regional archeological expedition of the Moscow University and Archeology Institute. In his publications German Fedorov-Davydov illuminated actual historical problems almost state-forbidden at that time. German Fedorov-Davydov was instrumental in organization of wide scale excavation of the capital Sarai (Sarai Berke and Sarai Djadid, New and Old Sarais), and other cities in the Volga region. G. Fedorov-Davydov continued traditions of pre-revolutionary numismatists (such as Christian Martin Frähn), contributing to the knowledge in the field, including the birth and development of the Russian monetary system and terminology.

German Fedorov-Davydov is an author of about 230 scientific and popular-scientific works, including 26 books. His monographs "East European Nomads under rule of Altyn Orda Khans" (1966), "Social order of Golden Horde" (1973), "Art of nomads and Golden Horde" (1976) became classical for the period of Early Middle Age world of the Euroasian steppes. His books were published in England, Germany, Belgium, Hungary, Poland, Estonia, among them are "City Culture of the Golden Horde" (Oxford, 1984), "Städte der Golden Horde an der unteren Wolga" (Munich, 1984), "Le tresor de Saransk Les Monnaies de la Russie Moskovit 14 et 15 ieme Siecle" (Belgium, 1985), "Le tresor de Saransk Les Monnaies de la Principaute de Nijegorod. 14-15 Siecles" (Belgium, 1992). The work "Coins tell" ("World", 1986, republished again in 1990) was even published in Marathi and Telugu Indian languages.

German Fedorov-Davydov was a member of Academy of Natural Sciences of the Russian Federation, and corresponding member of the German Archaeological Institute.
