= Kirill Lemokh =

Russian painter

- Кирилл Лемох
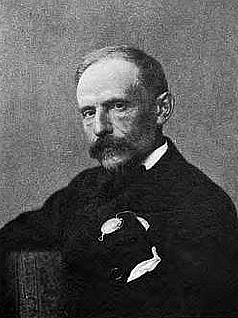
- Born: June 7, 1841; Moscow, Russia
- Died: February 24, 1910 (aged 68); Saint Petersburg, Russia
- Education: Imperial Academy of Arts (1863)
- Known for: Painting
- Style: Realism
- Movement: Peredvizhniki
- Elected: Member Academy of Arts (1875); Full Member Academy of Arts (1893)

Carl Johann Lemoch, also known as Kirill Vikentievich Lemokh (Russian: Кирилл Викентьевич Лемох: 1841–1910), was a Russian genre painter and member of the Imperial Academy of Arts.

== Biography ==
His father was a music teacher from Germany. From 1851 to 1856, he studied at the Moscow School of Painting, Sculpture and Architecture under Yegor Vasilyev. In 1858, he entered the Imperial Academy of Arts, where he studied history painting with Pyotr Basin and Alexey Markov.

Five years later, in 1863, he participated in what came to be known as the "Revolt of the Fourteen", a protest by those who preferred the Realistic style over the Classical style being promoted by the academy. As a result, he withdrew from the academy with the degree of Artist Second-Class. He joined the Artel of Artists, led by Ivan Kramskoi. Five years later, he entered an academy competition and became an Artist First-Class. From that point on, he earned his living by giving drawing lesson to aristocratic families and built an art studio in Khovrino, where he spent his summers painting.

In 1870, he joined with Grigoriy Myasoyedov to create the "Peredvizhniki" (Association of Traveling Art Exhibitions). He was briefly expelled from the Association for failing to provide work on time, but rejoined in 1879, eventually becoming a board member and Treasurer.

While still a member of the Artel, he accepted an invitation to give private drawing lessons to the children of future Tsar Alexander III and continued to do so for many years. Grand Duchess Olga, the Tsar's youngest daughter, turned out to be his best student there, and retained an interest in art for the rest of her life. He's been elected a full member of the Imperial Academy at its reformation in 1893, received a life pension and became a curator for the art collection at the Russian Museum until his retirement in 1909.

== Selected paintings ==
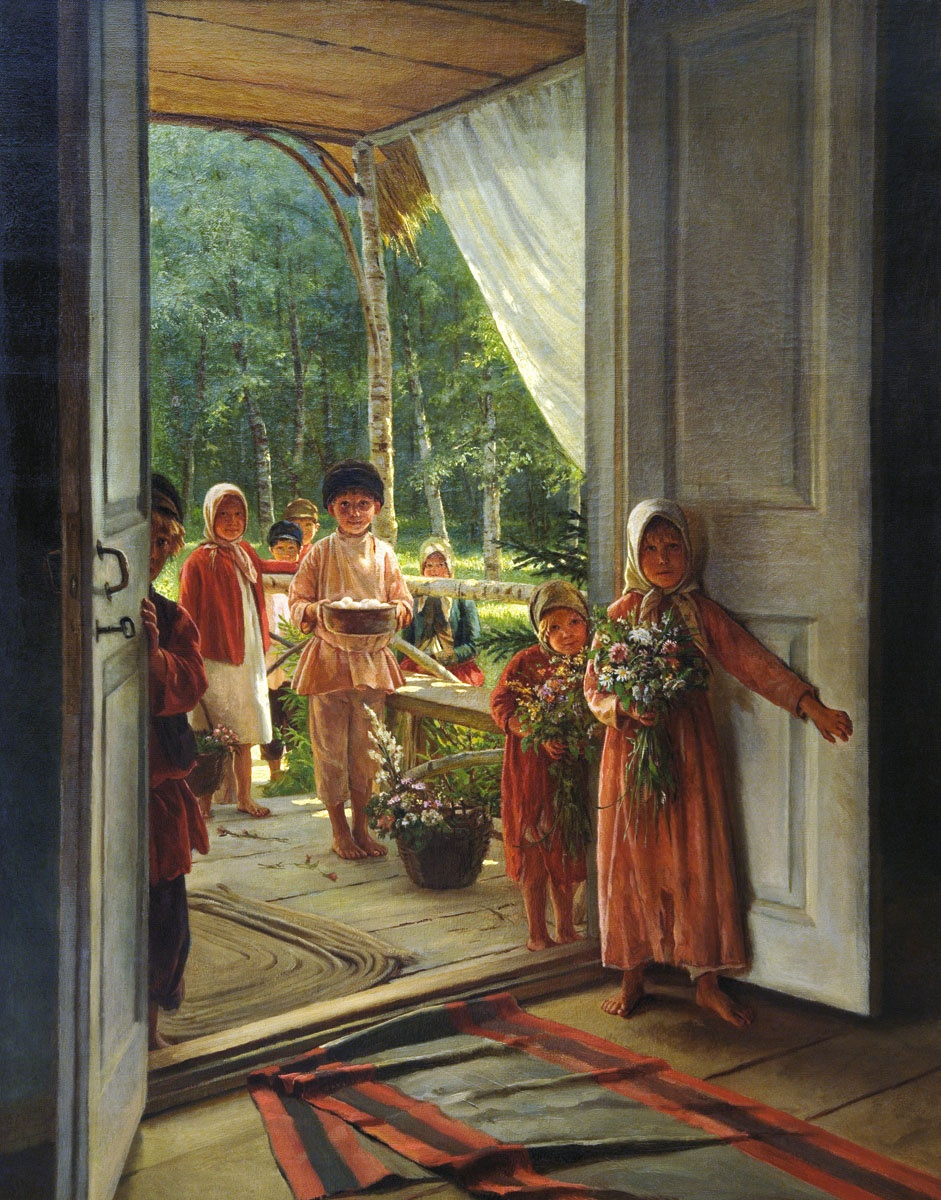
Congratulations (1890)

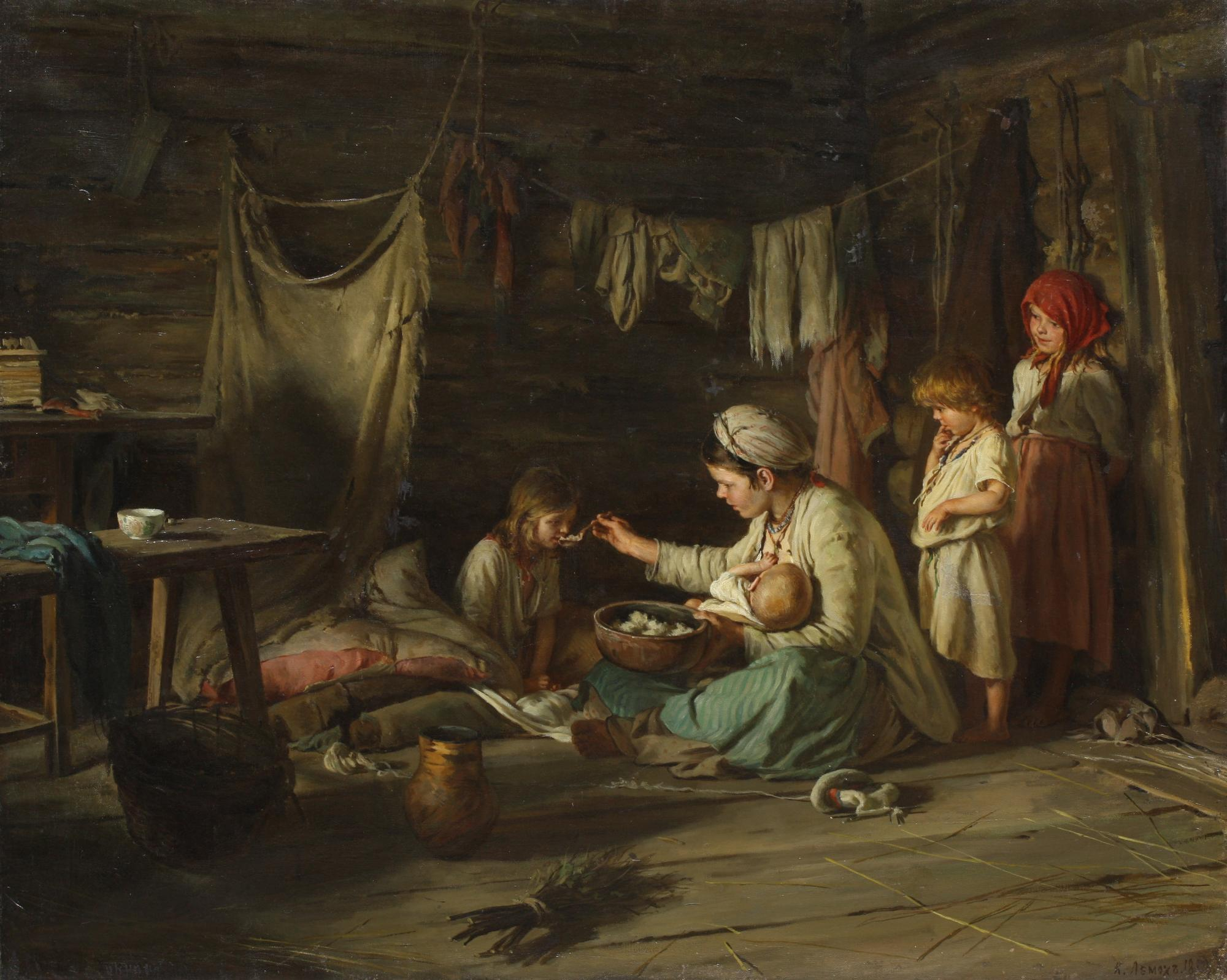
The Convalescent (1889)

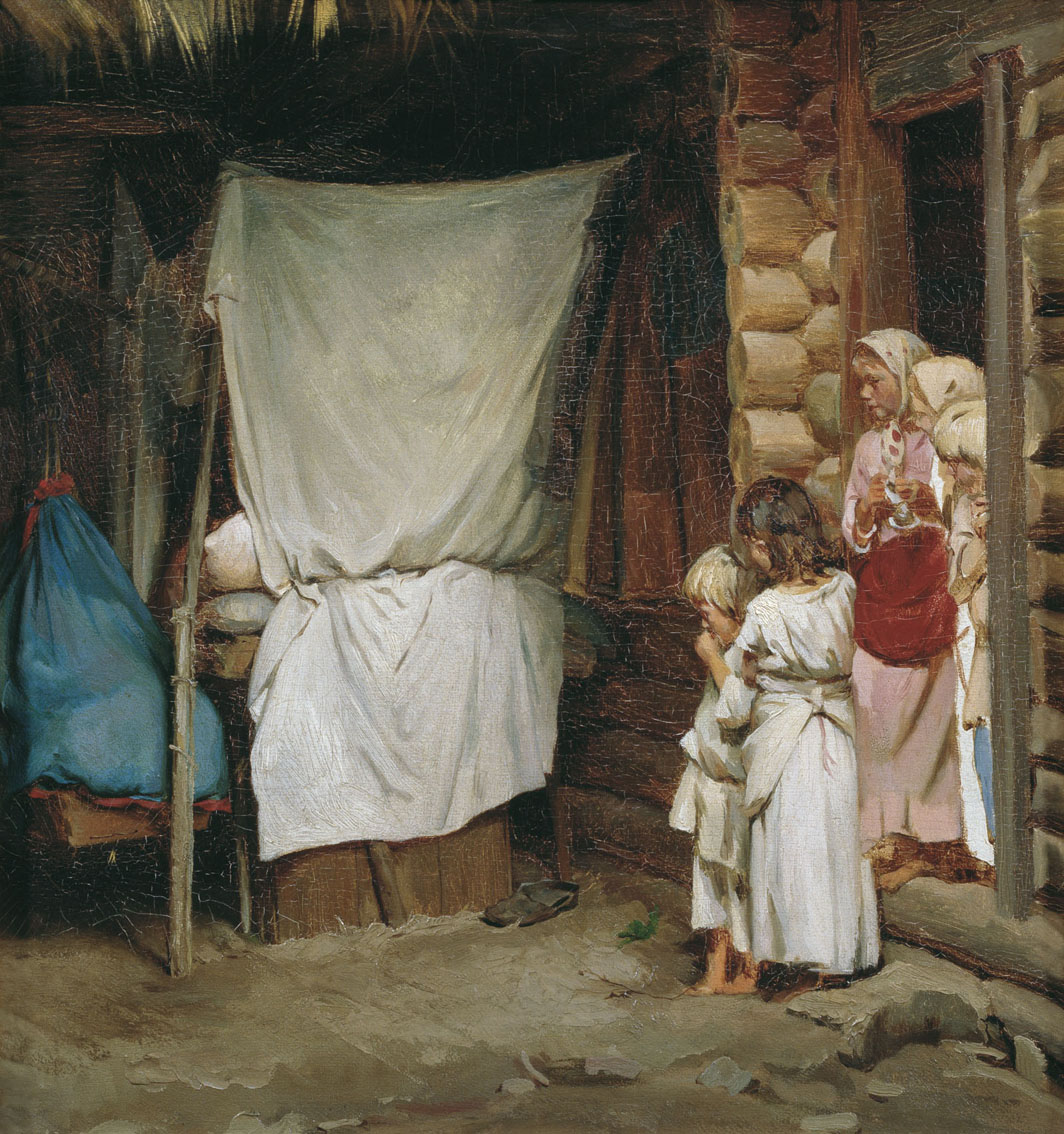
The New Family Member (1880s)

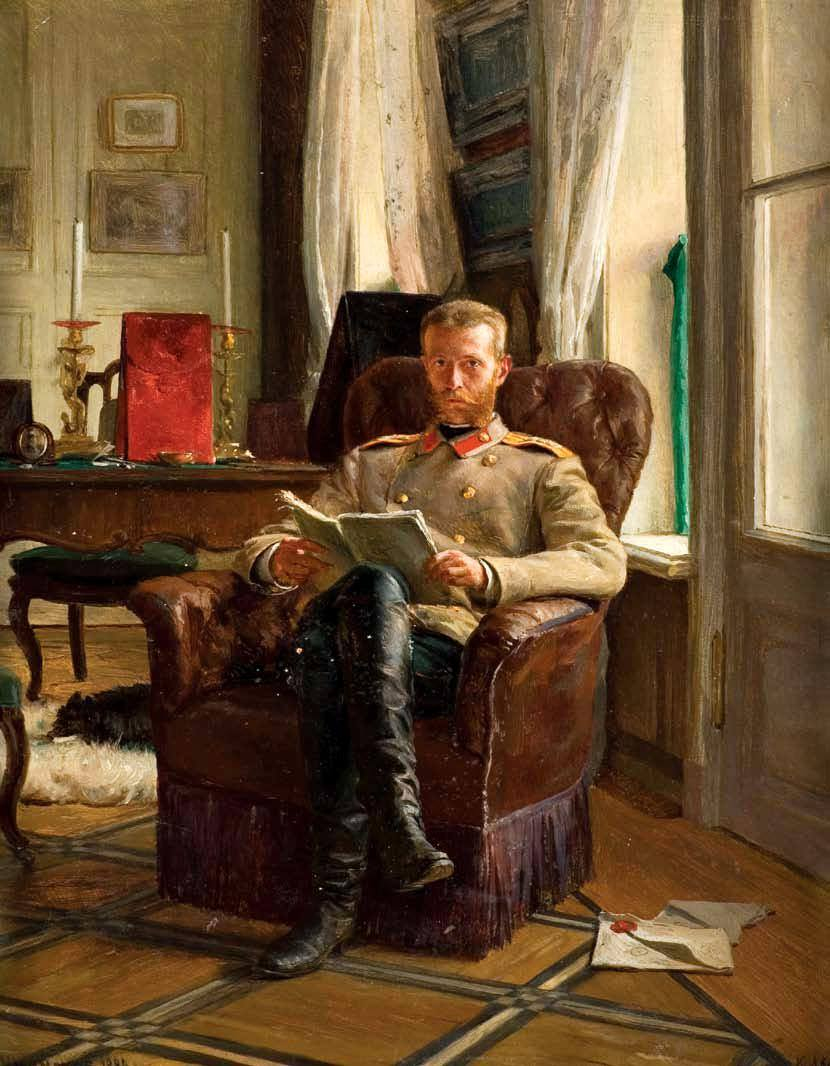
Grand Duke Sergei Alexandrovich Reading

== Sources ==
- "Lemokh, Kirill Vikentevich". Benezit Dictionary of Artists. 2011.
