= New Tretyakov Gallery =

Art museum in Moscow, Russia

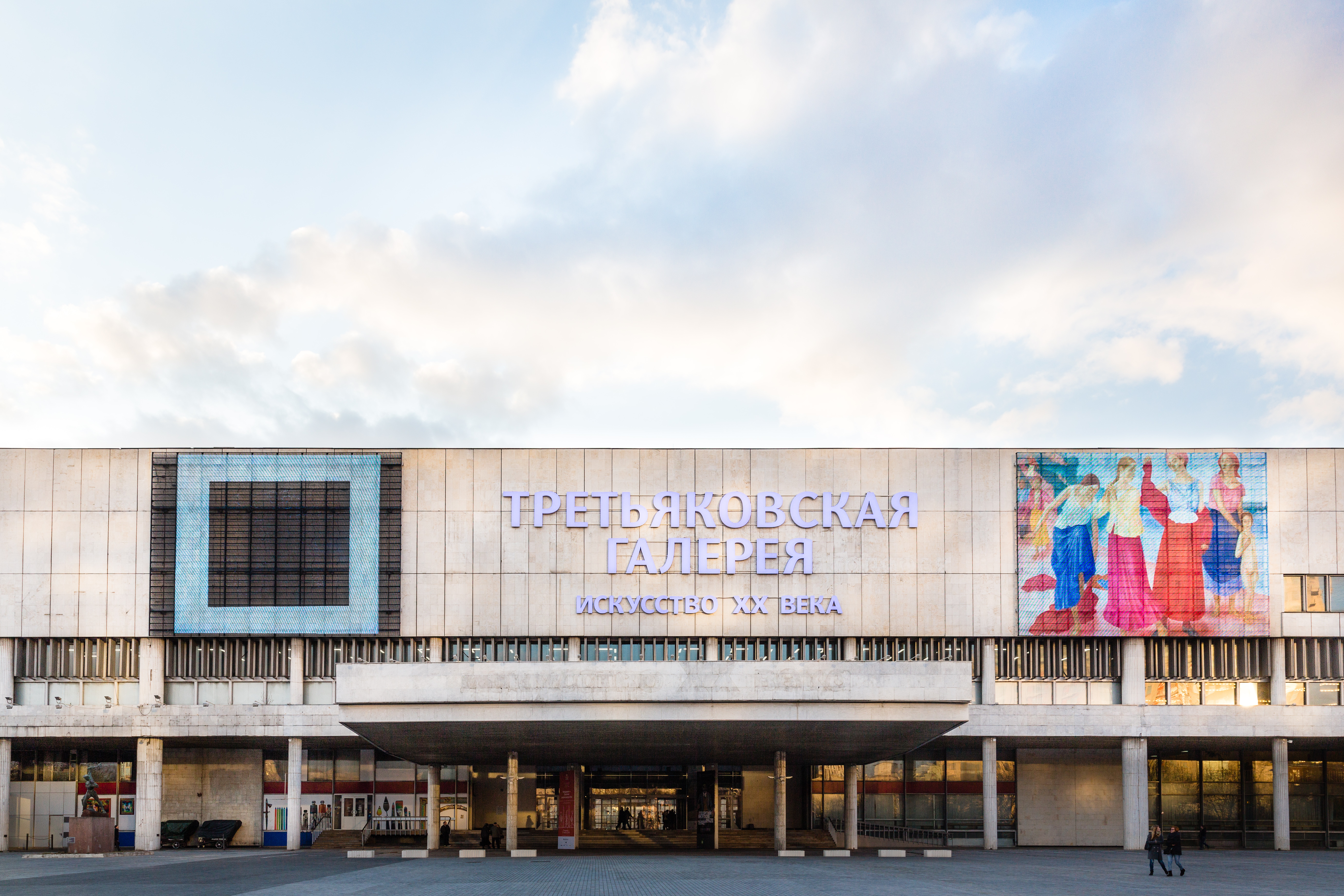
- The museum's building, 2013
- Established: 1986
- Location: Moscow, Russia
- Coordinates: 55°44′4.29″N 37°36′17.51″E
- Type: Art museum
- Director: Elena Pronicheva
- Website: www.tretyakovgallery.ru/for-visitors/museums/novaya-tretyakovka/

The New Tretyakov Gallery is the second building of the Tretyakov Gallery, located in Moscow in Krymsky Val in the Museon Park. It was built in 1983 according to the project of architects Yuri Sheverdyaev and Nikolai Sukoyan in Soviet modernism style. The first exhibitions were opened in 1986, the museum presents art trends of the 20th and 21st century: Russian avant-garde, socialist realism, art of the "austere style", underground and the newest trends. The museum has a creative workshop for children.

The building of the New Tretyakovka will be closed for reconstruction from 2023 to 2027–2028.

== History ==
=== Location background ===
The first plans to develop the location on the bank of the Moscow River near the Krymsky Bridge appeared in the 1920s. At that time it was planned to create a system of parks with a permanent agricultural exhibition on the territory. The project failed for bureaucratic reasons, and in 1930 the Government of Moscow discussed the possibility of building a Palace of Arts on the site. In 1936, a large scientific center was needed after the Academy of Sciences of the Soviet Unionmoved to Moscow. In the same year an architectural competition was held, and the project of Alexey Shchusev won. Construction began in 1939, but due to the outbreak of the Great Patriotic War the work was suspended, and in the post-war years the construction site was moved to Vorobyovy Gory.

In the 1950s the architect Ivan Zholtovsky proposed to build a new House of the Unions on the site. At the same time, the government began to discuss the construction of a new building for the 100th anniversary of the Tretyakov Gallery. The location near the Krymsky Bridge seemed to be the most suitable: in addition to the fact that the area was large enough to accommodate a multifunctional building, the founder of the gallery, Pavel Tretyakov, was born nearby —in Golutvinsky Lane— in 1832. But due to internal disagreements in the management of the gallery, the project was not realized. In 1959, the city authorities decided to transfer the property to the State Art Gallery of the USSR.

=== Building construction ===
The building was designed by the Ivan Zholtovsky Architectural Workshop according to the sketches of Yuri Sheverdyaev and Nikolai Sukoyan in the style of early Soviet modernism. The architects decided to give the building the form of a park pavilion oriented to the embankment of the Moskva River. According to the project, the building should be consistent with the ensemble of Neskuchny Garden and Gorky Park and be a large low pavilion with a continuous colonnade around the first-floor perimeter. The total area of the exhibition halls was 12,000 square meters. In 1962 it was decided to construct a building for two objects: the State Picture Gallery and the Central House of Artists.

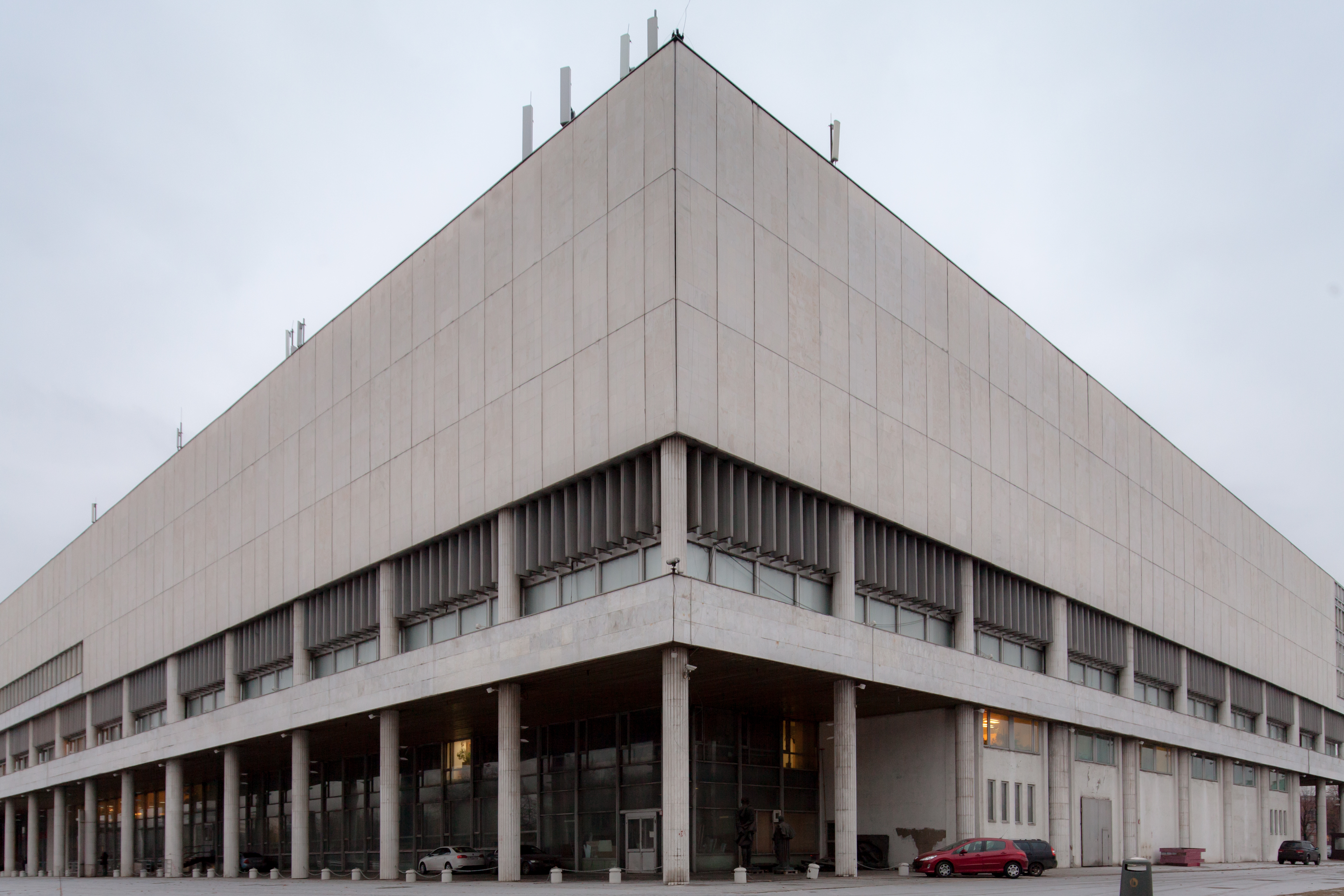
Museum building, 2014

Construction began in 1965. In 1977, the part of the building that belonged to the Artists' Union was partly finished. Two years later, the Central House of Artists was opened there. The building was completed in 1985.

=== Inauguration of the New Tretyakov Gallery ===
In 1986 the State Picture Gallery of the USSR was merged with the Tretyakov Gallery to form the All-Union Museum Association, which also included the Museum-Apartment of Appolinariy Vasnetsov, the House-Museum of Viktor Vasnetsov, the Museum-Museum of Anna Golubkina, the House-Museum of Pavel Korin with his studio, the Church of St. Nicholas in Tolmachi, and the Memorial Estate of Pavel Tretyakov.

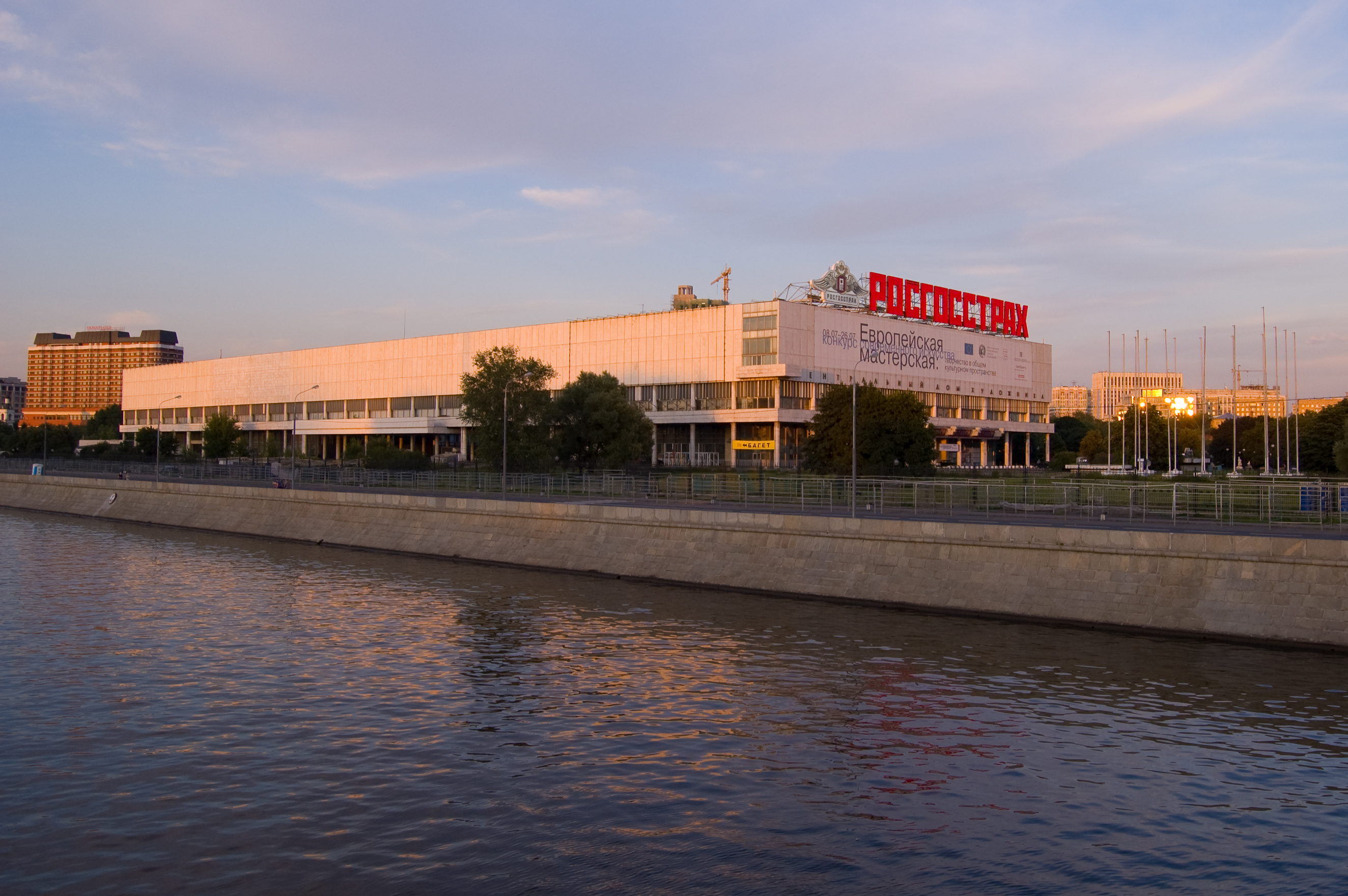
View of the New Tretyakov Museum, 2009

The first temporary exhibitions were opened to the public in 1986: "40 Years of Victory over Fascism", "The Youth of the Country" and "Stages of the Great Patriotic War". At the same time the main building of the Tretyakov Gallery in Lavrushinsky Lane was closed for restoration and a part of the works of painting, graphics, sculpture, theater and decorative art of the 20th century was transferred to the building on Krymsky Val. After the restoration of the main building was completed in 1996, the works of art of the 20th century were moved to the building in Krymsky Val, where the first permanent exhibition was organized.

== Exposition ==
By 2018 it had over 5,000 20th and 21st century artworks. One of the largest collections consists of paintings by the Russian avant-garde of the 1900-1920s, represented by the following artists: Kazimir Malevich, Wassily Kandinsky, Marc Chagall, Pavel Filonov, and Lyubov Popova. The works of major painters and sculptors of socialist realism are widely represented in the exposition. In the permanent exposition of halls 15–20, 24 and 25, entitled "The Art of the Soviet Era. 1920-1950s", there are the paintings New Moscow (painting) (1937) by Yuri Pimenov, Stalin and Voroshilov in the Kremlin (1938) by Aleksandr Gerasimov, Spring (1954) and Haymaking (1945) by Arkady Plastov. In Halls 26–30, 33, 35 and 36, united in the section "Art of the Soviet Era. 1950s–1980s", the work of Dmitry Zhilinsky is well represented, especially the paintings A Family on the Seaside (1964) and Sunday Day (1973).

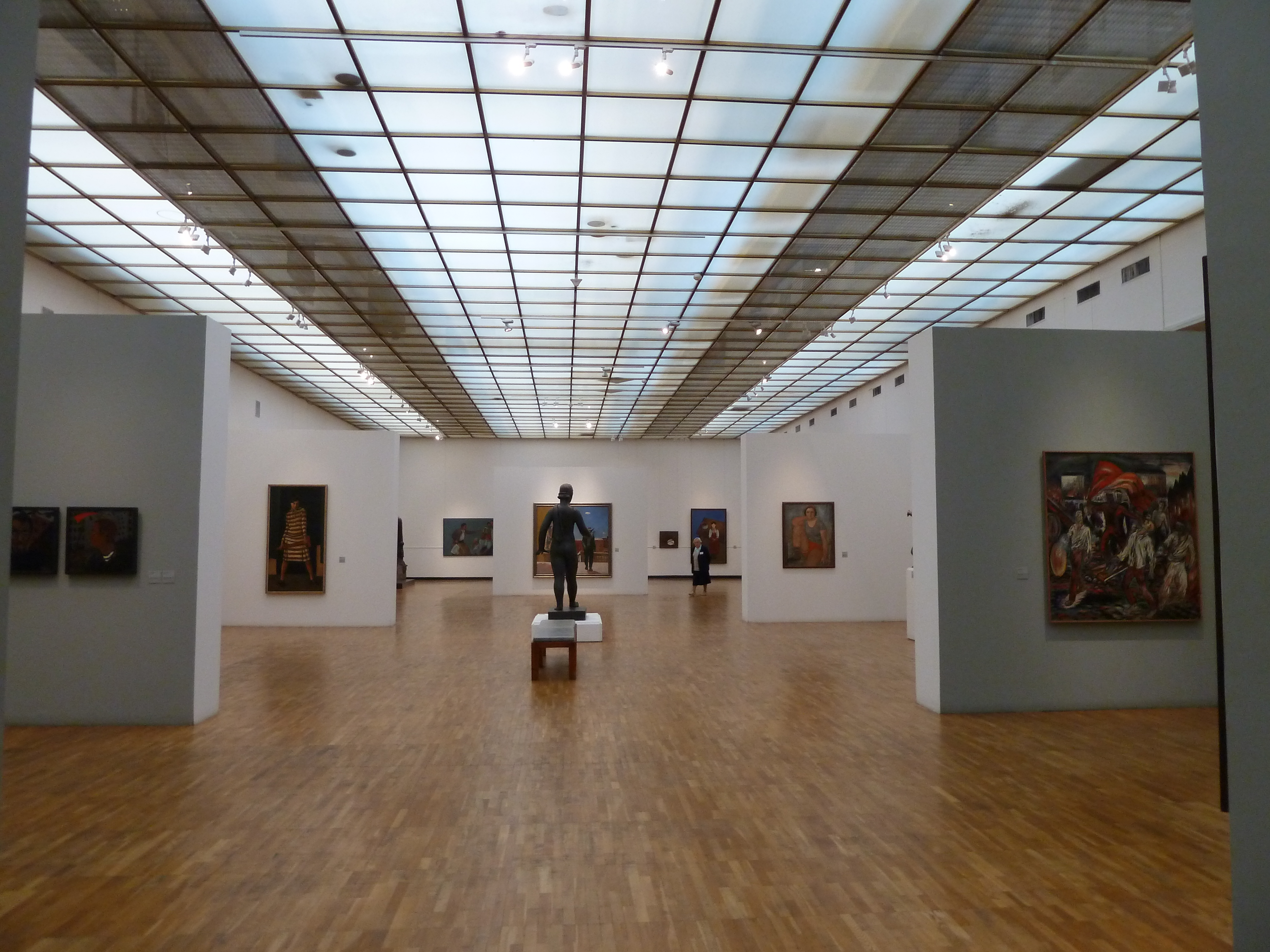
Gallery interiors, 2011

The collection of contemporary painting began to take shape in the 1990s thanks to acquisitions by the Ministry of Culture and gifts from artists and their heirs. Thus, in the early 2000s, the collection of the Department of Contemporary Art of the Tsaritsyno Museum-Reserve, assembled by Andrei Yerofeev, was transferred to the Museum.

In 2007, the museum management changed the concept of exhibition organization. According to the innovations, the viewing of paintings begins with the art of 1900, and the paintings are arranged thematically – the works of one artist can be presented in several halls at the same time. In the halls were also displayed decorative and applied art objects and photographs acquired by Vera Mukhina.

In 2014, the museum received a large collection of contemporary art by Leonid Talochkin, donated to the Tretyakov Gallery by the collector's widow with the support of the Ministry of Culture. In 2016, a new permanent exhibition, "Contemporary Art: 1960–2000. Reset." All works are grouped according to directions and thematic sections: "Abstraction", "Kinetic and Optical Art", "Mystics and Surrealists", "New Realism", "Pop art", "Minimalism and Post-Painterly Abstraction", "Sots Art", "Conceptualism — Image in the Head", "Poetry and Writing", "Performance Art", "Machines of Understanding", "Neo-Expressionism", "Conceptualism — New Generation", "Archaeology of Postmodernism", "Actionism of the 1990s", and "Project: Art of the 2000s". In 2018, the Vinzavod Foundation for the Support of Contemporary Art donated ten works by young artists of the 1990s and 2000s to the museum.

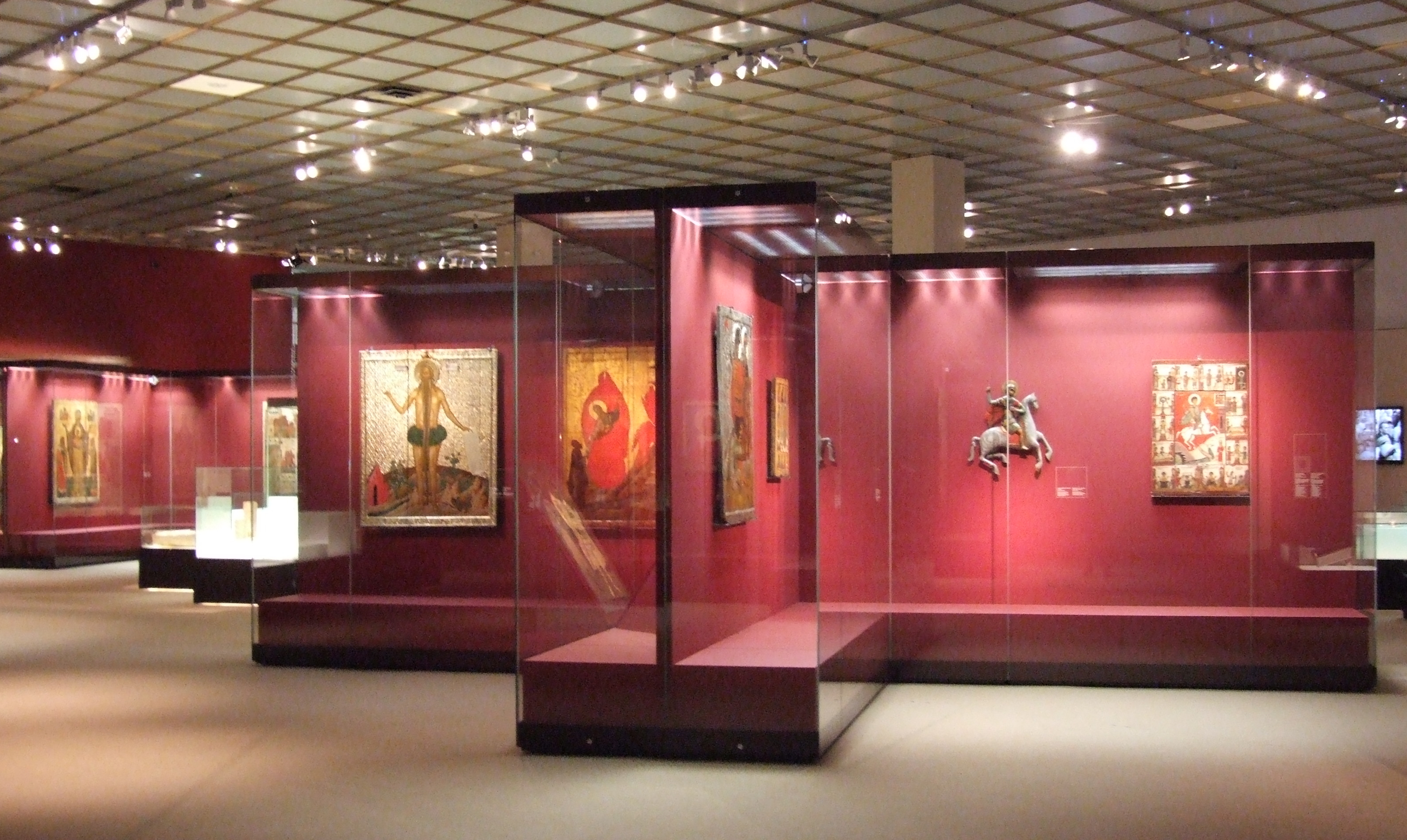
Exhibition "Holy Russia", 2011

Tretyakov Gallery director Zelfira Tregulova said:

We missed the great works of that period, and now we won't be able to buy them when they come on the market because they cost a huge amount of money, not comparable to what was paid in the 90s and 2000s, so we don't want to repeat the mistakes of previous generations. We will start to collect contemporary art now.

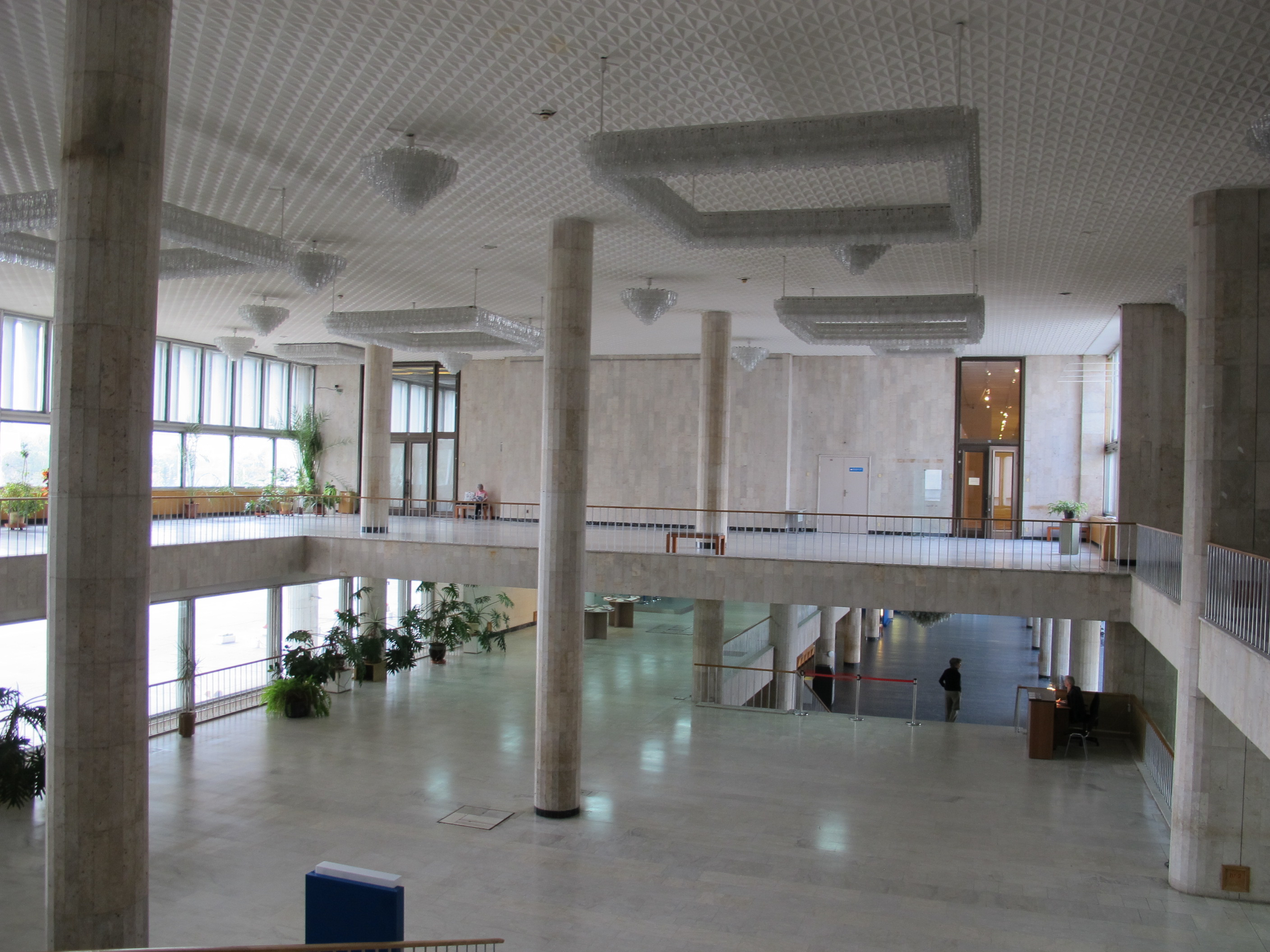
Museum interiors, 2011

In September 2019, the museum opened a hall in honor of the collector George Costakis, who, before his departure abroad, donated more than 800 works to the Tretyakov Gallery — a collection of the Russian avant-garde consisting of 142 paintings and 692 graphic works. Among them are such world-class masterpieces as "Portrait of Matyushin" by Kazimir Malevich, "Shostakovich's Symphony" by Pavel Filonov, "Red Square" by Wassily Kandinsky, "Pictorial Architectonics. Black, Red, Gray" by Lyubov Popova, "Running Landscape" by Ivan Kliun. The exposition of the nominal hall, which presents more than 50 paintings and graphic works, will be changed mainly for the sake of preservation of graphic works, which cannot be exhibited for more than three months.

== Current time ==
=== Modernization and reconstruction ===
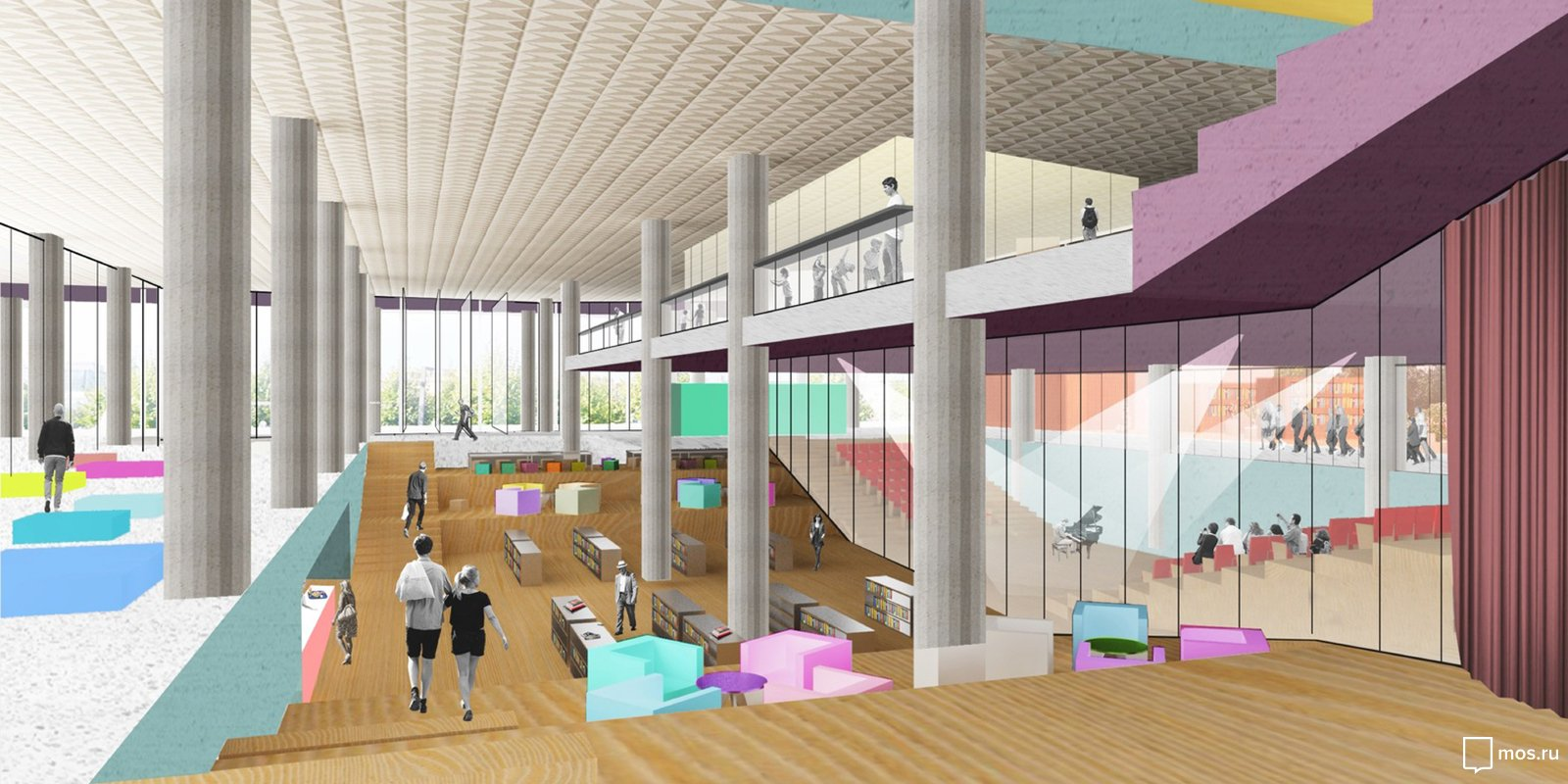
Building reconstruction project, 2018

In 2008 it became known that the city authorities planned to demolish the building of the Central House of Artists on Krymsky Val and to build in its place a new building of the Tretyakov Gallery – a round exhibition center "Orange" designed by Norman Foster, which would also include apartments, offices and shops. The decision of the gallery management caused a great public outcry, so the plans were abandoned.

A change in the image of the museum was announced by the management of the Tretyakov Gallery in 2015. To avoid being confused with other branches of the Tretyakov Gallery, the building on Krymsky Val, developed by the Zoloto Group, was called "New Tretyakovka". The navigation was also changed: the space was divided into letter sectors, following the example of the Metropolitan Museum of Art in New York, and a café, lecture hall and souvenir shop were opened. In 2015, the architectural firm Rem Koolhaas undertook the reconstruction of the building. In 2016, after the renovation, a 4,000 m^{2} courtyard with a fountain and amphitheater was opened for events: educational lectures, music programs, and other events.

Since 2017, a part of the Central House of Artists, which was vacated by the International Conference of Artists' Unions by the decision of the Supreme Court of Russia, was transferred to the Tretyakov Gallery at the request of Vladimir Medinsky. In October 2018, it became known that early next year the Central House of Artists will move its events to Manezh and Gostiny Dvor, and the building on Krymsky Val will be fully transferred to the New Tretyakovka.

In February 2018, the Rem Koolhaas bureau presented a concept for the next renovation, according to which the building will be divided into four sectors: a repository, an education center, an exhibition space, and an assembly hall. According to the architects' plan, the windows on the facades of the building will be enlarged, and the walls framing the atrium from the inside will be dismantled, making the building completely transparent. Instead of the existing enfilade of rooms, a large exhibition area with a view of Gorky Park will be created, and the staircases will be replaced by colored escalators.

In August 2019, the museum management announced that the New Tretyakovka building would be completely closed for reconstruction from 2023 to 2027 or 2028. Part of the exposition will be sent to storage, and the other part will be displayed in a new building on the Kadashyovskaya Embankment.

=== Selected permanent exhibits ===
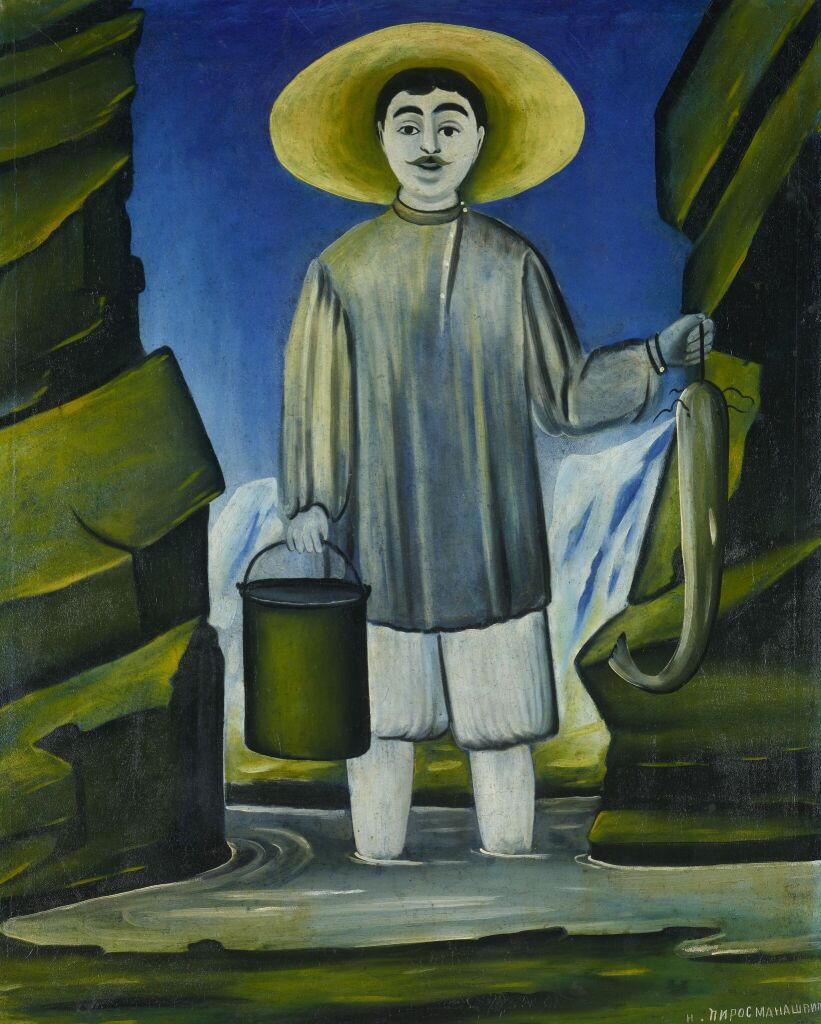
Niko Pirosmani. Fisherman among rocks. 1906

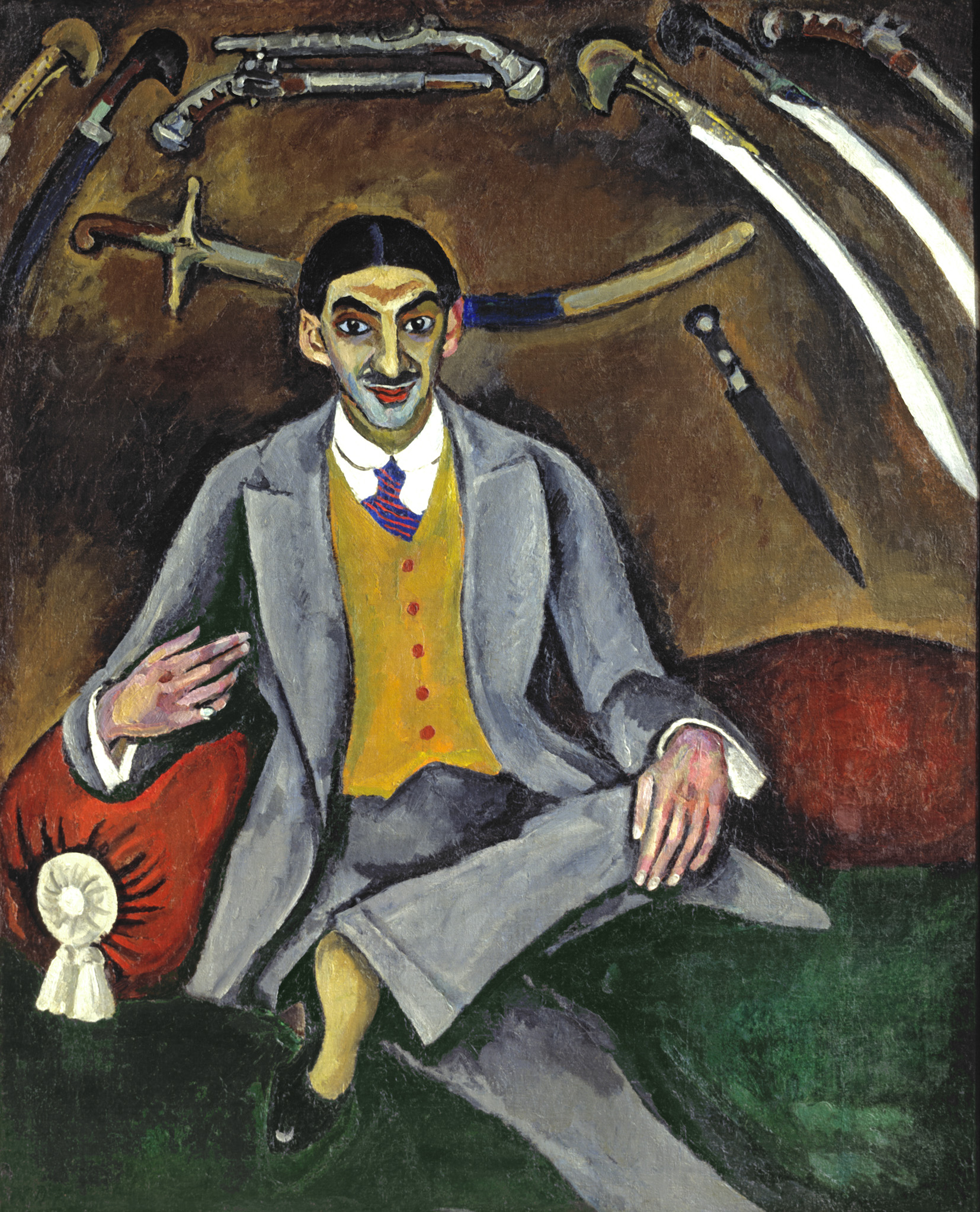
Pyotr Konchalovsky. Portrait of G. B. Yakulov. 1910

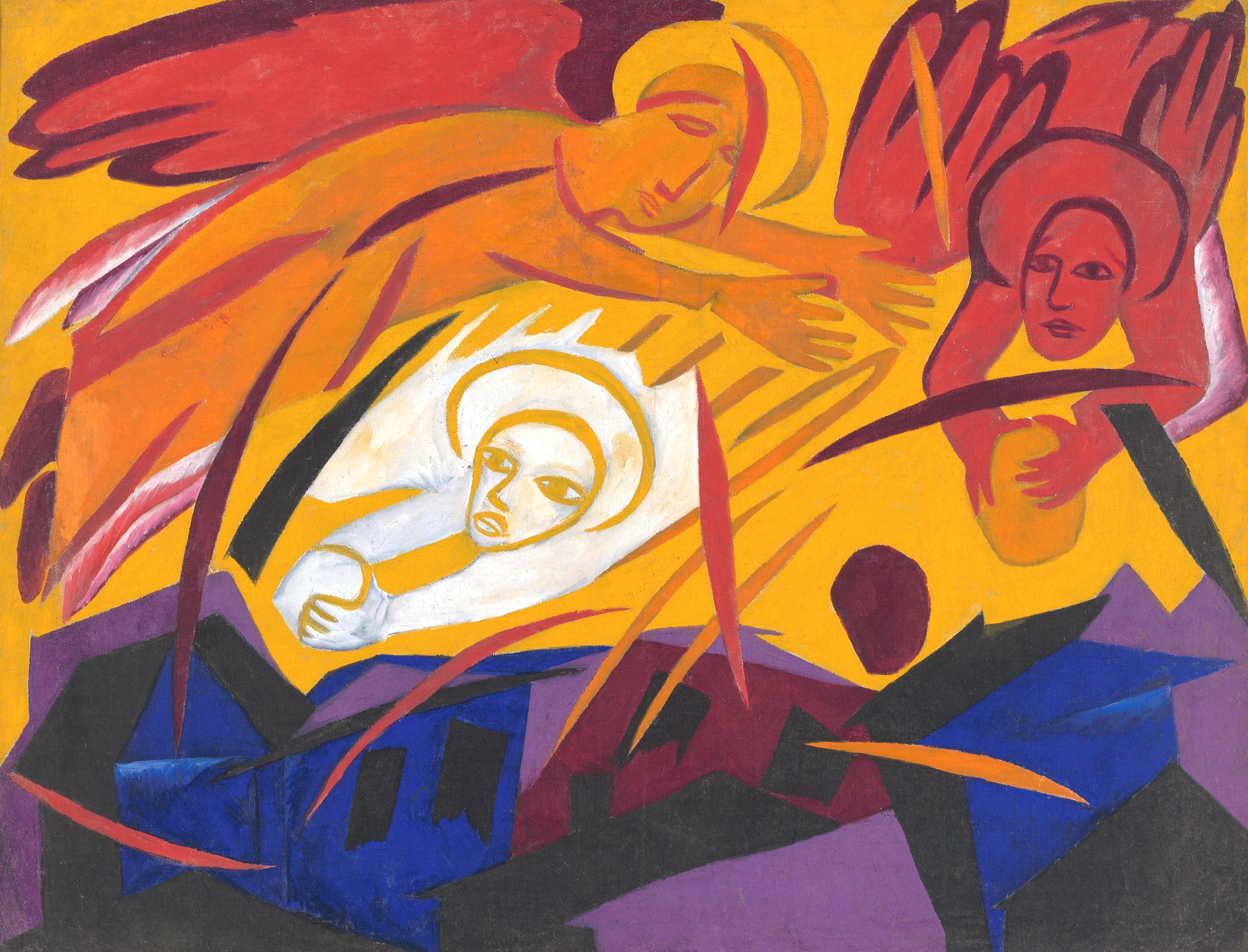
Natalia Goncharova. Angels Throwing Stones at the city. 1911

Wassily Kandinsky. Composition VII. 1913

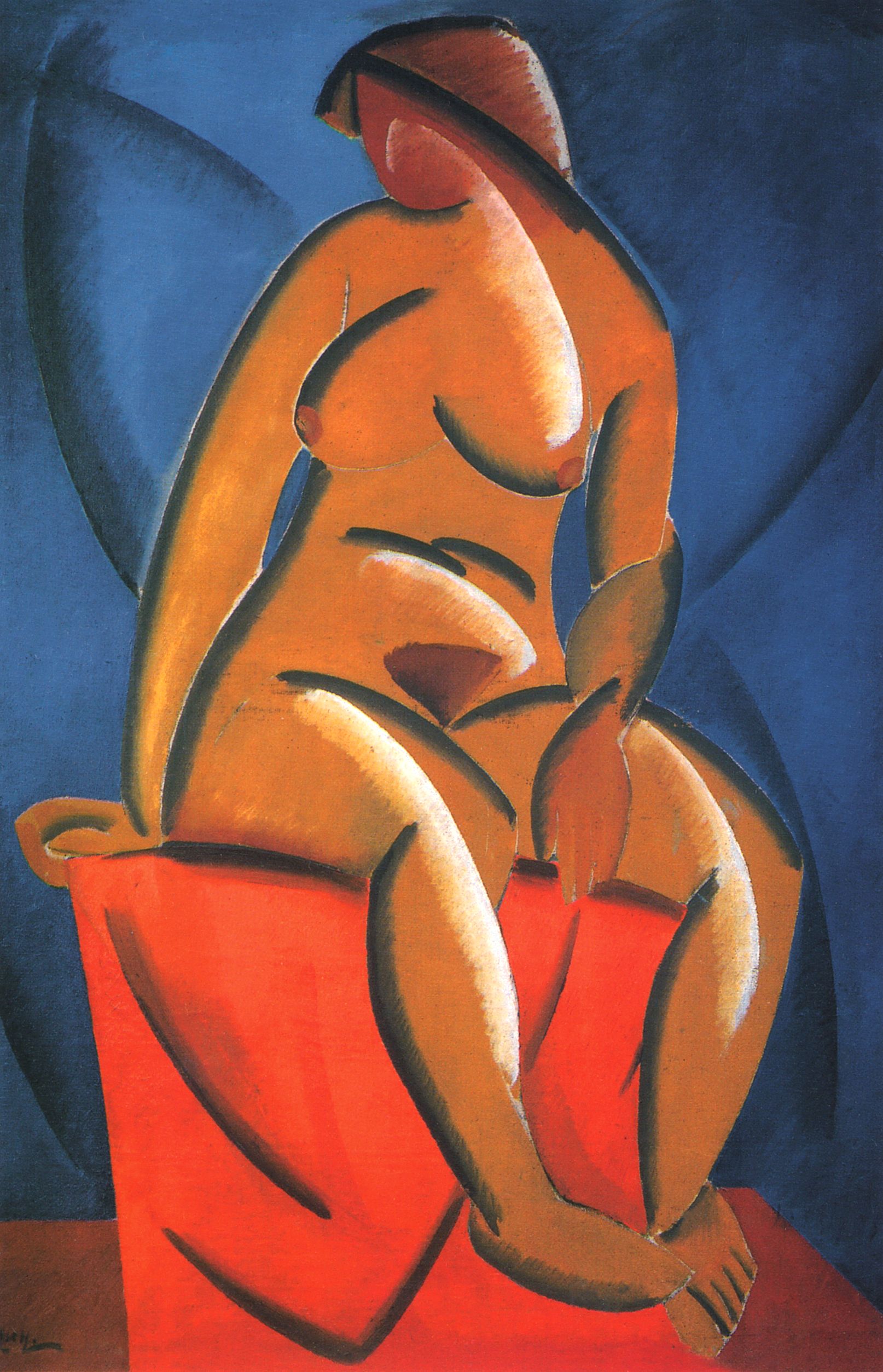
Vladimir Tatlin. A model. 1913

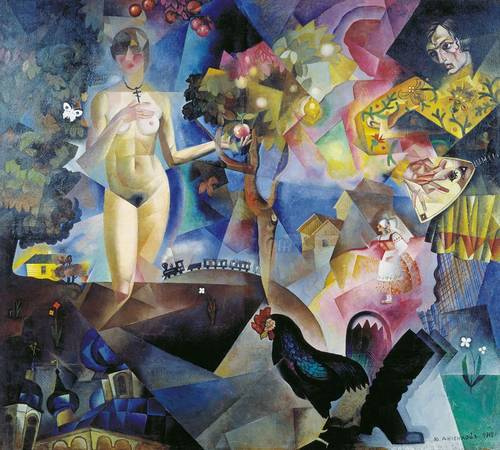
Yury Annenkov. Adam and Eve. 1913–1918

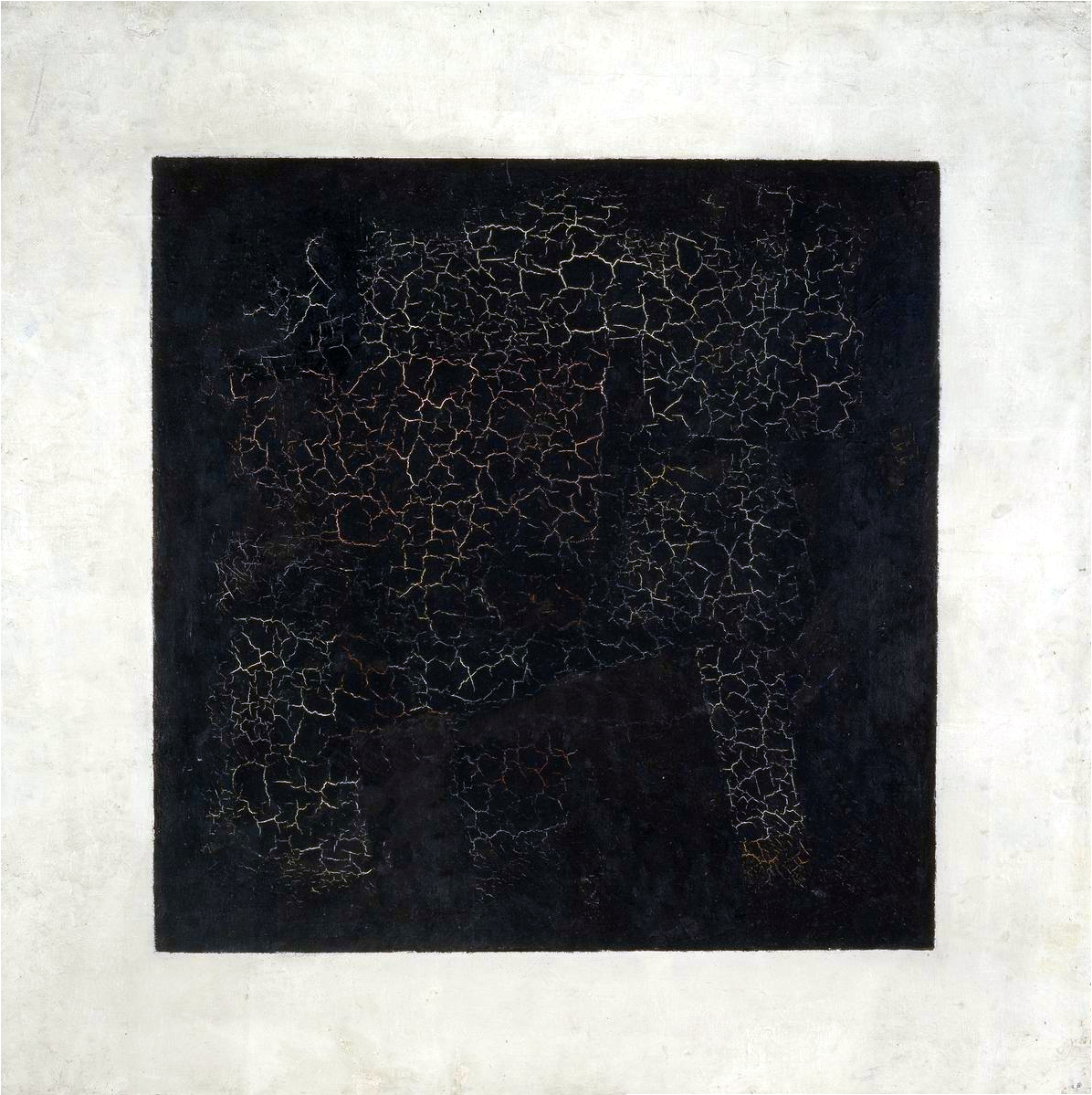
Kazimir Malevich. Black Square. 1915

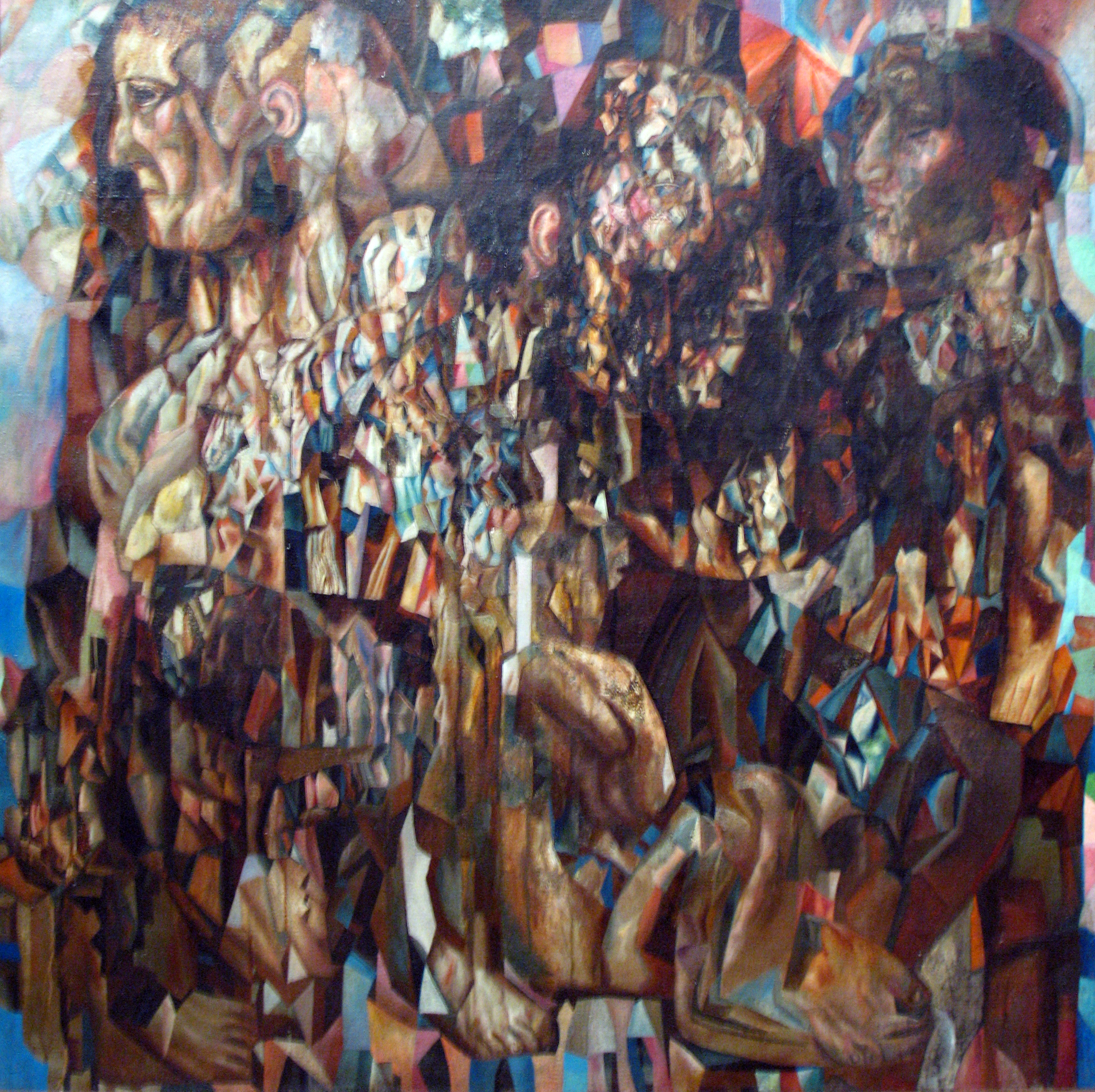
Pavel Filonov. Composition. Faces. 1915

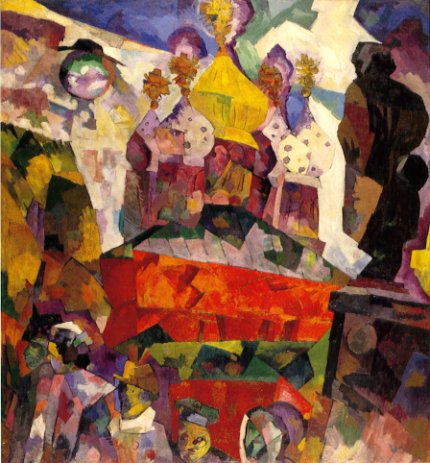
Aristarkh Lentulov. Tverskoy Boulevard. 1917

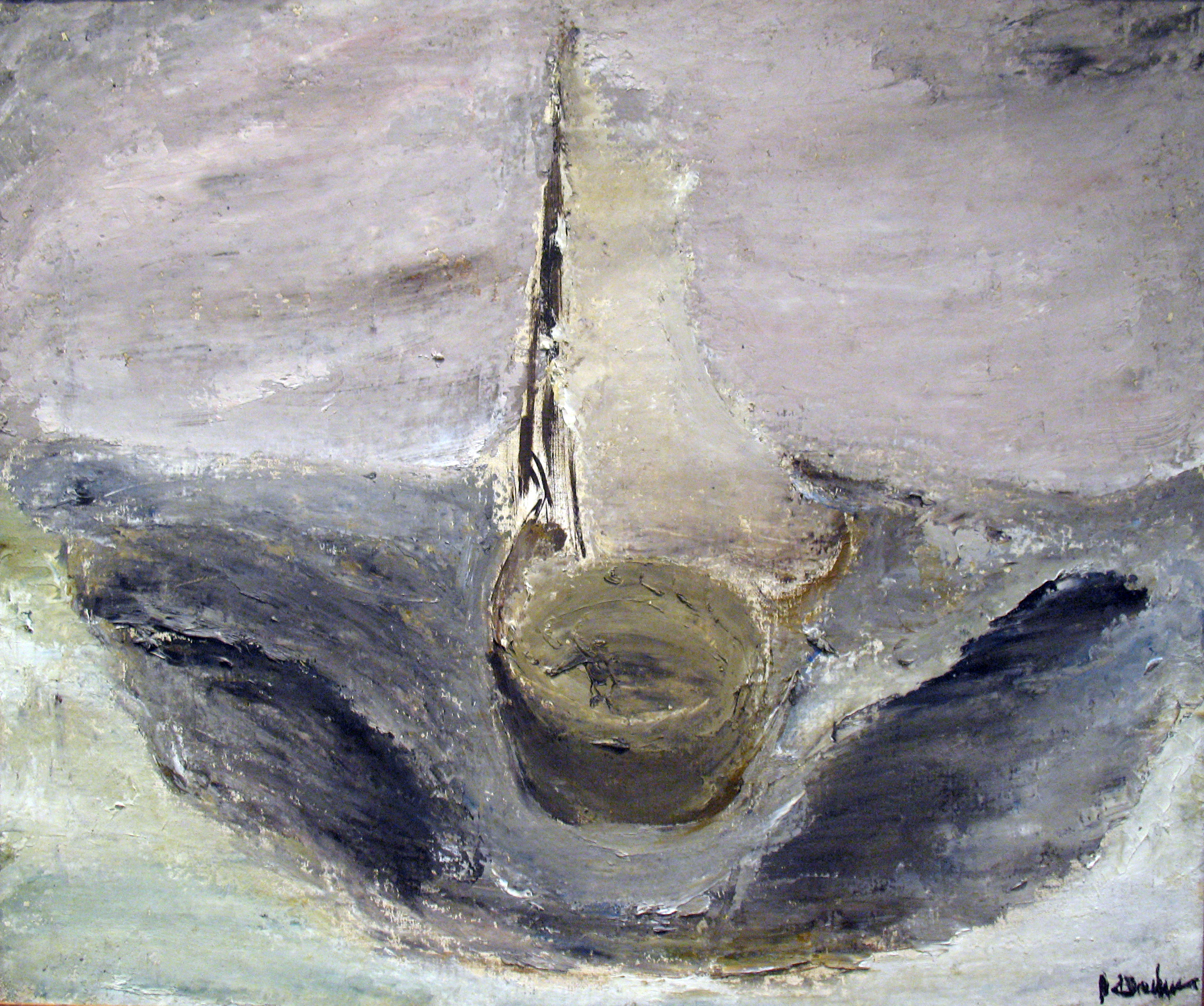
Alexander Drevin. Boat. 1931

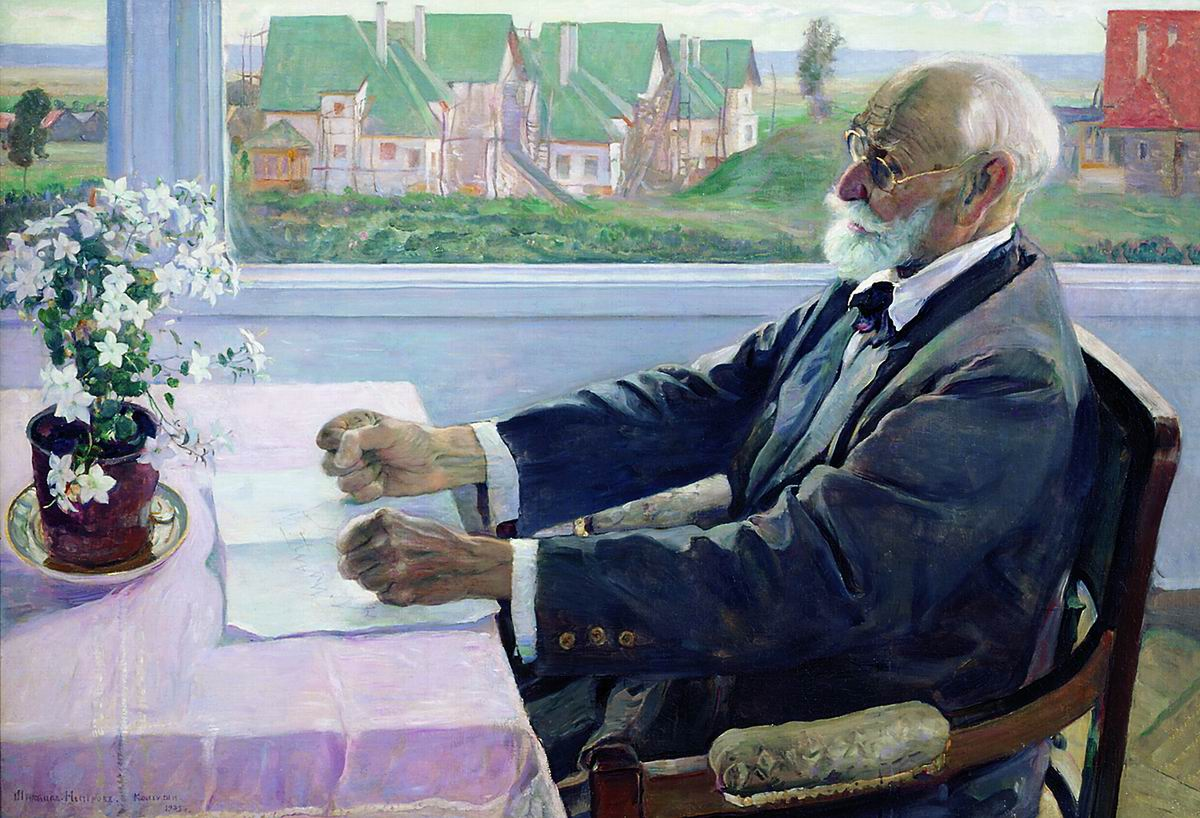
Mikhail Nesterov. Portrait of I. P. Pavlov. 1935

=== Major exhibitions of recent years ===
2016

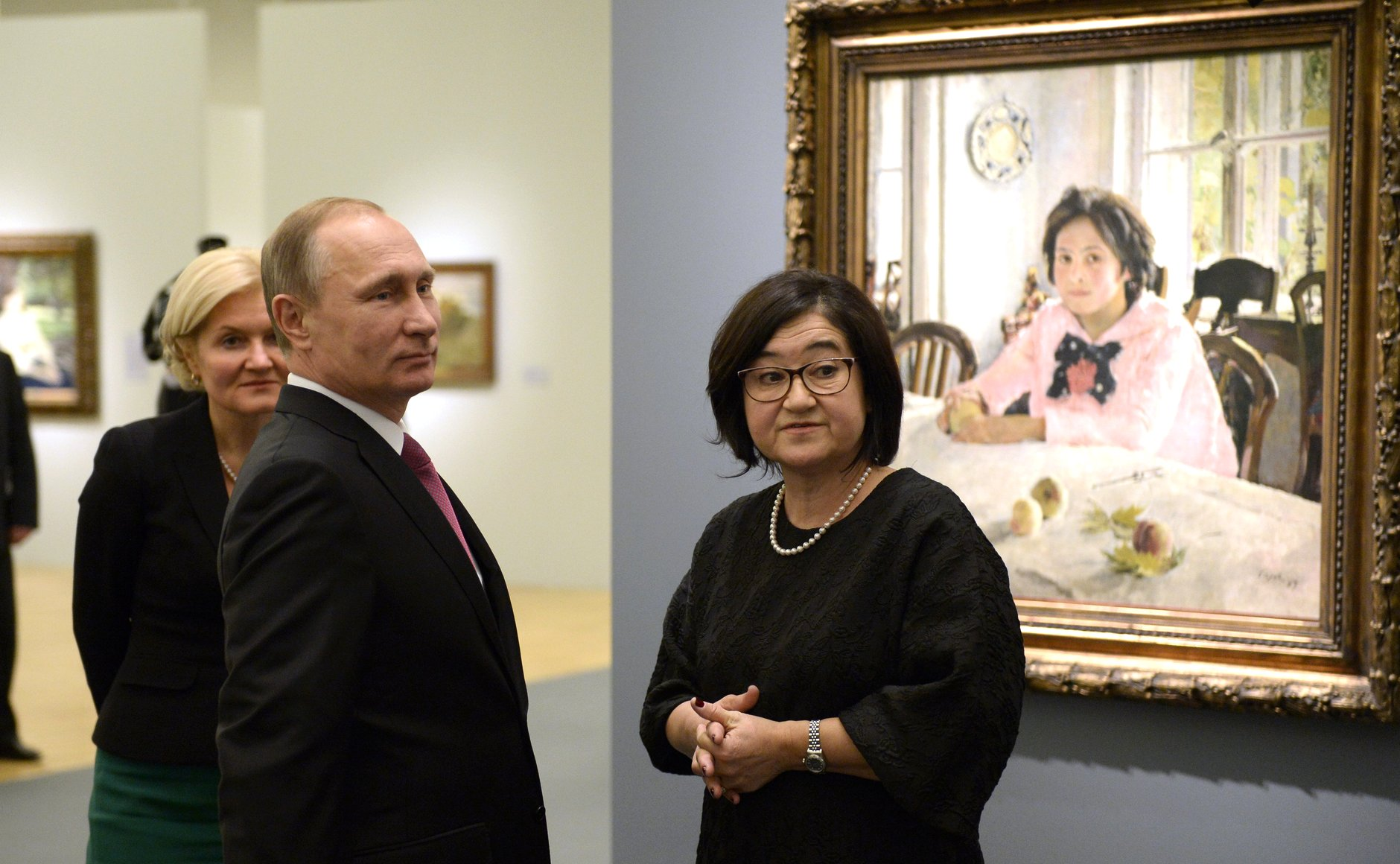
- Valentin Serov's exhibition of works, 2016
  An exhibition of paintings by Valentin Serov from state and private collections. The event received widespread media coverage, with long queues outside the New Tretyakovka building causing the museum to work for 15 hours a day, and the Ministry of Emergency Situations organizing field kitchens to keep visitors warm. In total, more than 485,000 people visited the exhibition.

2017

- An exhibition of paintings by Ivan Aivazovsky, organized for the 200th anniversary of the artist's birth.
- In honor of the Centenary of the Revolution, an exhibition entitled "Someone in 1917" was held, featuring works created mostly in 1917. Among the paintings on display were works by Boris Grigoriev, Boris Kustodiev, Mikhail Nesterov, Kuzma Petrov-Vodkin, Zinaida Serebryakova, as well as Wassily Kandinsky, Kazimir Malevich, and Alexander Rodchenko.
- The exhibition project "Thaw", dedicated to the events of 1950–1960. The exhibited paintings by Alexander Kryukov, Olga Rapai, Andrei Goncharov, as well as photographs and objects illustrated the culture of that time.

2018

- An exhibition of works by Vasily Vereshchagin, dedicated to the 175th anniversary of the artist's birth, which included more than 500 exhibits from 20 museums and private collections. In addition to canvases, ancient weapons, oriental robes, a sculpture by Nicholas of Mozhaysk, and a real door from the tomb of Timur in Samarkand were exhibited.
- Temporary exhibition "Ilya and Emilia Kabakov. Not everyone will be taken into the future" with early and later works: "An Incident in the Corridor Near the Kitchen", "Trash Man or a Man Who Never Threw Anything Away", "Three Nights", "Labyrinth. My Mother's Album" and others.
- Exhibition of works by the Russian avant-garde artist Mikhail Larionov. The exhibition included the artist's canvases "Jack of Diamonds", "Donkey's Tail", "Target", "Luchists and Budushchniks" and others.

== Bibliography ==
- Орлова М. Третьяковка открыла вход с набережной и ждет любителей русского авангарда и соцреализма. — М.: The Art Newspaper, 2015. — Ed. 05. — P. 17.
- Русская галерея. — М.: ЗАО «Арт Сервис Центр», 1999.
- Сахно И. М. Инновационное освоение городского пространства: здание на Крымском Валу. — Российский университет дружбы народов, 2017. — Ed. 04. — P. 17.
- Шедевры архитектуры, живописи, скульптуры. — М., 2011. — 160 p. — ISBN 978-5-271-27228-8
- Шедевры русского искусства: из собраний Государственной Третьяковской галереи и художественных музеев России. — М.: Сканрус, 2004. — 515 p.
