= Central House of Artists, Moscow =

Gallery in Moscow

The Central House of Artists (New Tretyakov Gallery)
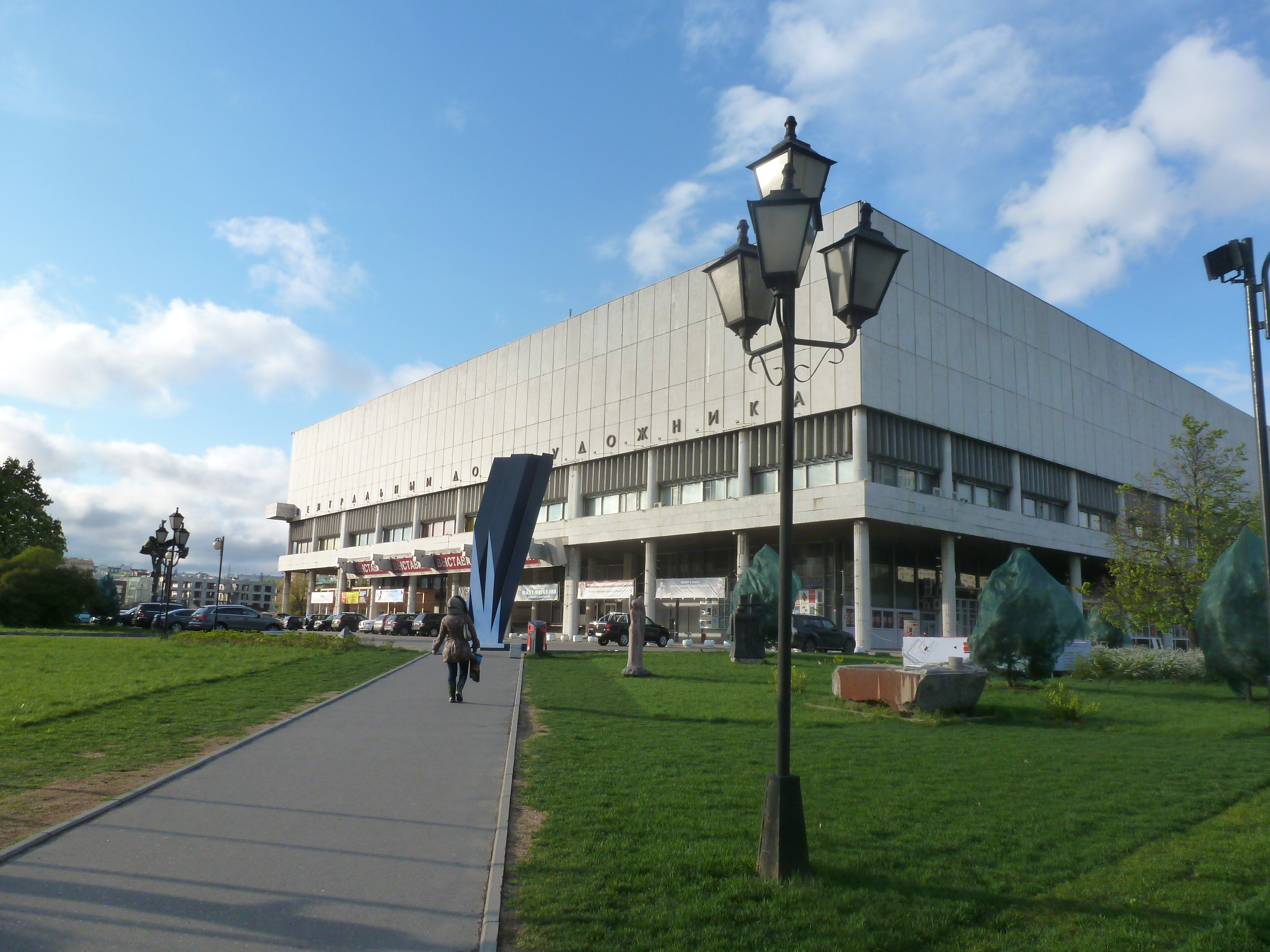
- The Central House of Artists
- Interactive fullscreen map
- Established: 1979
- Location: Moscow, Russia
- Coordinates: 55°44′06″N 37°36′22″E
- Type: Art museum
- Website: new.cha.ru

The Central House of Artists, Moscow (Russian: Центра́льный дом худо́жника) is a four storey art gallery in Moscow. It was a historical exhibition center in Moscow, the establishment of the International Confederation of Unions of Artists, one of the most famous complexes of its kind in Russia, which existed from 1979 to 2019. During the years of its existence, the Central House of Artists shared one building with the Tretyakov Gallery (New Tretyakov Gallery); from March 2019, the entire building was planned to be transferred under the management of the New Tretyakov Gallery.

The Central House of Artists in Moscow ceased to exist in April 2019, and the exhibition space was transferred to the New Tretyakov Gallery.

It was built by the Artists' Union of the USSR.

== General Information ==
The Central House of Artists is in the center of Moscow and is surrounded by the Muzeon Park of Arts. The outdoor exhibition of the Museum of Sculpture fits organically into the thoughtful park ensemble and is complemented by recreation areas and playgrounds for children. Located on Krymsky Val, 10, Moscow, Russia, 119049

== History of the building ==
Initially, in September 1956, the Council of Ministers of the USSR adopted a resolution on the construction of two buildings - the building for the Tretyakov Gallery and the Exhibition Building of the Union of Artists of the USSR. Subsequently, it was decided to construct one building for two objects. The project was completed in 1962-1963 and approved for construction in March 1964. Construction began in 1965. The Central House of Artists opened in November 1979.

The main authors of the building project were architects Nikolai Sukoyan and Yuri Sheverdyaev. In addition, other architects took part in the design. Various research institutes were involved in the project.

== Exposition ==
=== Tretyakov Gallery ===
The Tretyakov Gallery exhibition on Krymsky Val includes works of art by Russian and Soviet artists who worked in the 1920s-1960s: Kazimir Malevich, Wassily Kandinsky, Marc Chagall, Mikhail Larionov, Robert Falk, Pyotr Konchalovsky, Pavel Korin, Pavel Filonov, Aleksandr Deyneka, Vera Mukhina, Sergey Konenkov, Ivan Shadr, Vladimir Favorsky, artists of the "severe style" and many others. At the design stage, it was decided to leave the pre-revolutionary exhibition in the old Tretyakov Gallery building on Lavrushinsky Lane.

In addition, in the building of the Tretyakov Gallery on Krymsky Val, various exhibitions are held, varied in theme and exhibition material, and master classes are organized with famous contemporary artists as part of the activities of the Contemporary Art Club.

=== Central House of Artists ===
Various exhibitions of contemporary art, architecture and design were held in the exhibition halls of the Central House of Artists. Exhibitions of works by artists from Europe, the Middle East, Asia, and America were held. Back in the 1980s, a series of exhibitions by world-class artists were shown in the halls of the Central House of Artists. Artists such as: Yves Saint Laurent (designer), Francis Bacon (artist), Giorgio Morandi, Jannis Kounellis, Robert Rauschenberg, James Rosenquist, Salvador Dalí, Jean Tinguely, Rufino Tamayo, Israel Tsvaygenbaum, etc.

Also, the international fair of intellectual literature "Non/fiction" was held annually at the Central House of Artists. The fair was first held in the Central House of Artists building in 1999. The Moscow International Art Salon of the Central House of Artists, the Annual International Art Fair of contemporary world art "Art Moscow" and the international exhibition of architecture and design "Arch Moscow", Russian Antique Salons were also held there.

In 2019, the building on Krymsky Val was completely transferred to the Tretyakov Gallery. Responding to new realities and following trends, the Central House of Artists Online project was born. A virtual platform for selling and purchasing works of art and antiques and holding interactive exhibitions.

== See also ==
- New Tretyakov Gallery
- Tretyakov Gallery
