= We demand peace! =

- Требуем мира!
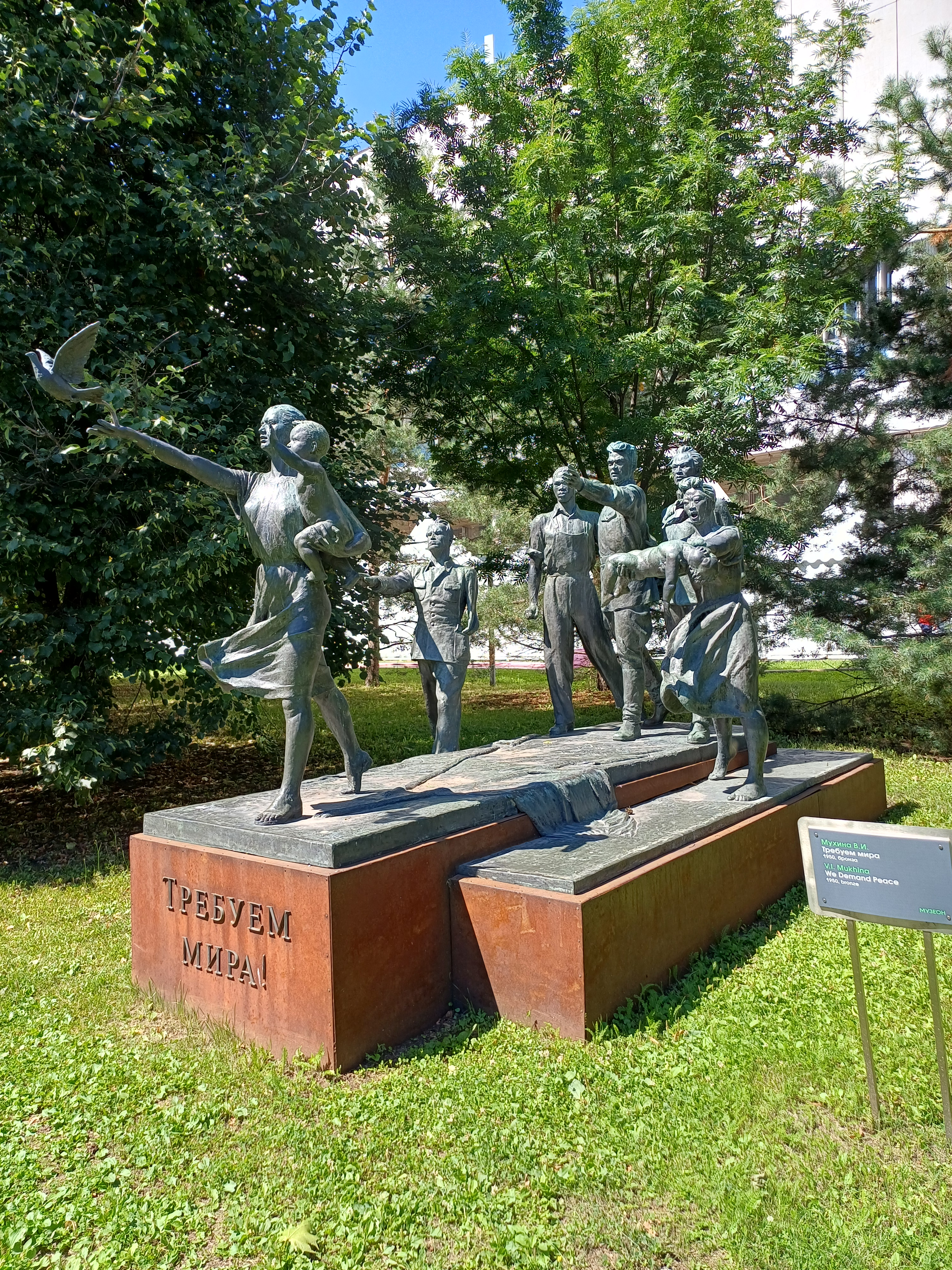
- Interactive map of We demand peace!
- Coordinates: 55°44′06″N 37°36′28″E
- Completion date: 1950

"We demand peace!" (Russian: Требуем мира!) is a multi-figure sculpture set in Moscow in the park "Muzeon". It was made in 1950 in response outbreak of the Korean War, by the sculptor Vera Mukhina, together with Nina Zelenskaya, Zinaida Ivanova, S. V. Kazakov, and A. M. Sergeyev.

== History ==
Vera Mukhina decided to make a sculpture "We demand peace!" in 1950, after learning about the war in Korea. Together with her, the creative team worked on the monument: Nina Zelenskaya, Zinaida Ivanova, Sergey Kozakov and Alexander Sergeev. Vera Mukhina called her work "agitational sculpture". It was specially made by the method of galvano from light metal to facilitate transportation to various international conferences dedicated to the world peace. In 1951, for the composition "We demand peace!", the collective of sculptors was awarded the Stalin Prize of the second degree.

Two identical copies of this monument were made. One of them remained in Moscow and was installed at VDNKh near Mira Avenue, and the second one was sent to Pyongyang. The Moscow monument stood on VDNKh until 1994, after which it was moved to the "Muzeon". There the sculpture stood in incomplete form: only three of the six figures were represented, the rest were damaged and stored in the museum's storerooms. By the beginning of the 2010s the monument was in a bad condition, there were a number of fragments. In 2012–2013, the restoration of the sculpture was carried out, the lost fragments were restored according to the gypsum original kept in the Russian Museum.

== Description ==
The sculptural composition "We demand peace!" includes six figures going in the same direction. Three figures in the middle - a black man, a Chinese and a Russian - go with their hands clasped behind the defeated banners of the German army. They symbolize nations that are striving for peace. To the left is a blind invalid of war in a shabby European soldier's uniform, to the right - a Korean mother raising a dead child. These figures are reminiscent of the victims of the war. In front of all there is a beautiful young woman with a child. From her outstretched hands flies a pigeon - a symbol of peace. This figure, apparently, represents a bright peaceful future, to which humanity aspires.

The main drawback of the sculptural composition of critics was called its disunity, it does not look like a single whole. Art critic S. S. Valerius also noted the ambiguity of the interpretation of the work, in particular, the figure of a woman with a dove.

Of the six figures, Vera Mukhina herself completely fulfilled only one - a Korean woman with a dead child. With plastic wealth and power, this figure clearly stands out from the whole composition. For its foundation was taken a sketch "Mother with a dead child", made by Mukhina in 1941 under the impression from the first days of the Great Patriotic War. The sculptor said this about her heroine: "She will go to the partisans - there can be no question of pleading".
