= Muzeon Park of Arts =

Park of communist artworks, in Moscow

Coordinates: 55°43′58″N 37°36′19″E

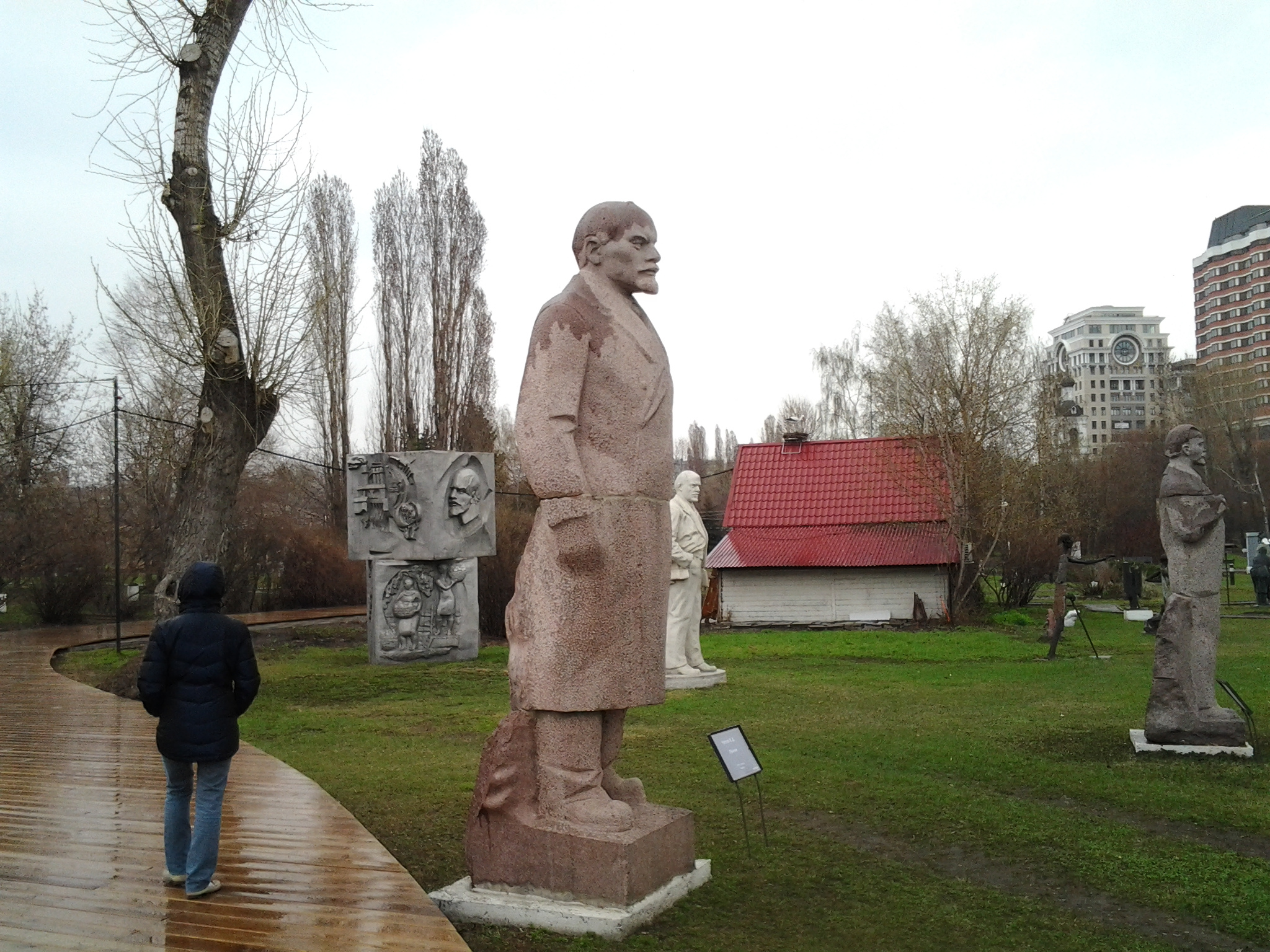
Vladimir Lenin statue in the "fallen heroes" section in Muzeon Park of Arts

The Muzeon Park of Arts (formerly the Park of the Fallen Heroes or Fallen Monument Park) is a park outside the Krymsky Val building in Moscow shared by the modern-art division of the Tretyakov Gallery and the Central House of Artists. It is located between the Park Kultury and the Oktyabrskaya underground stations. The largest open-air sculpture museum in Russia, it has over 1,000 artworks currently in its collection.

The origins of the English-language exonym "Fallen Monument park" are unknown; Russian-language speakers either simply call the park the Sculpture Park of the Central House of Artists (Russian: Парк скульптуры ЦДХ) or reference its legal title, Muzeon Park of Arts (Russian: Парк Искусств, Park Iskusstv - literally: "Park of the Arts").

== Background ==
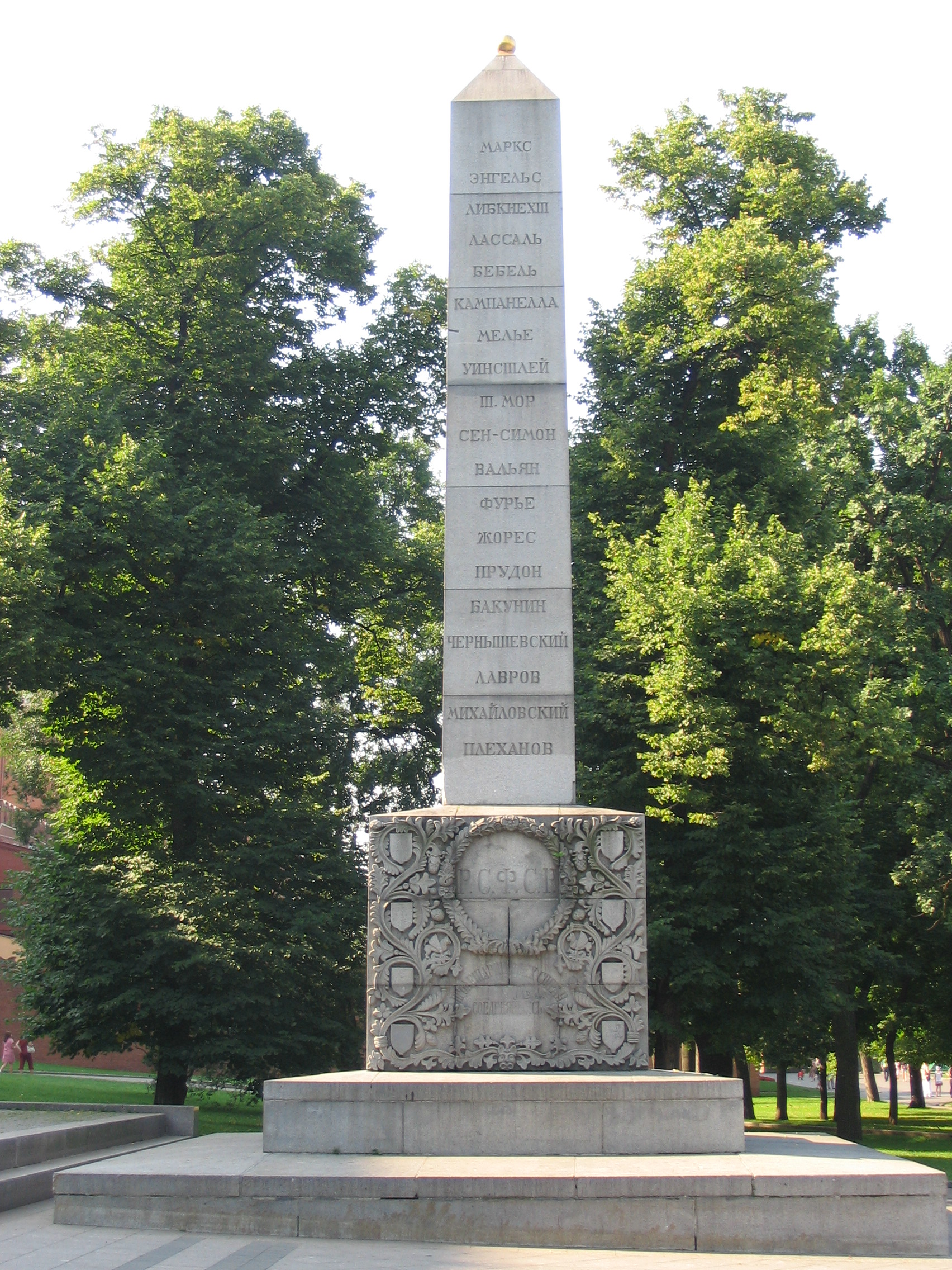
The Alexander Garden Obelisk that was altered in 1918

The contestation and removal of monuments in the USSR goes back to its foundation. On April 12, 1918, Vladimir Lenin, revolutionary leader of the Bolsheviks, released a decree "on the monuments of the Republic" in which he proclaimed that all monuments to the tsars and their affiliates should be removed from public view. He called for the establishment of a commission to decide on the fate of these monuments and to organize the creation of new monuments and emblems that would align with the Socialist revolution. In many cases the new Communist statues took the literal place of the statues removed under Lenin’s 1918 decree, being erected on the same site. One example of these monument transformations is the Alexander Garden Obelisk in Moscow which originally memorialized the Romanov dynasty and was altered in 1918 to honor revolutionary left-wing thinkers such as Karl Marx and Friedrich Engels. A few exceptions were made where pre-Revolution statues remained in their original state, such as the equestrian statue to Peter the Great in St. Petersburg commissioned by Catherine the Great.

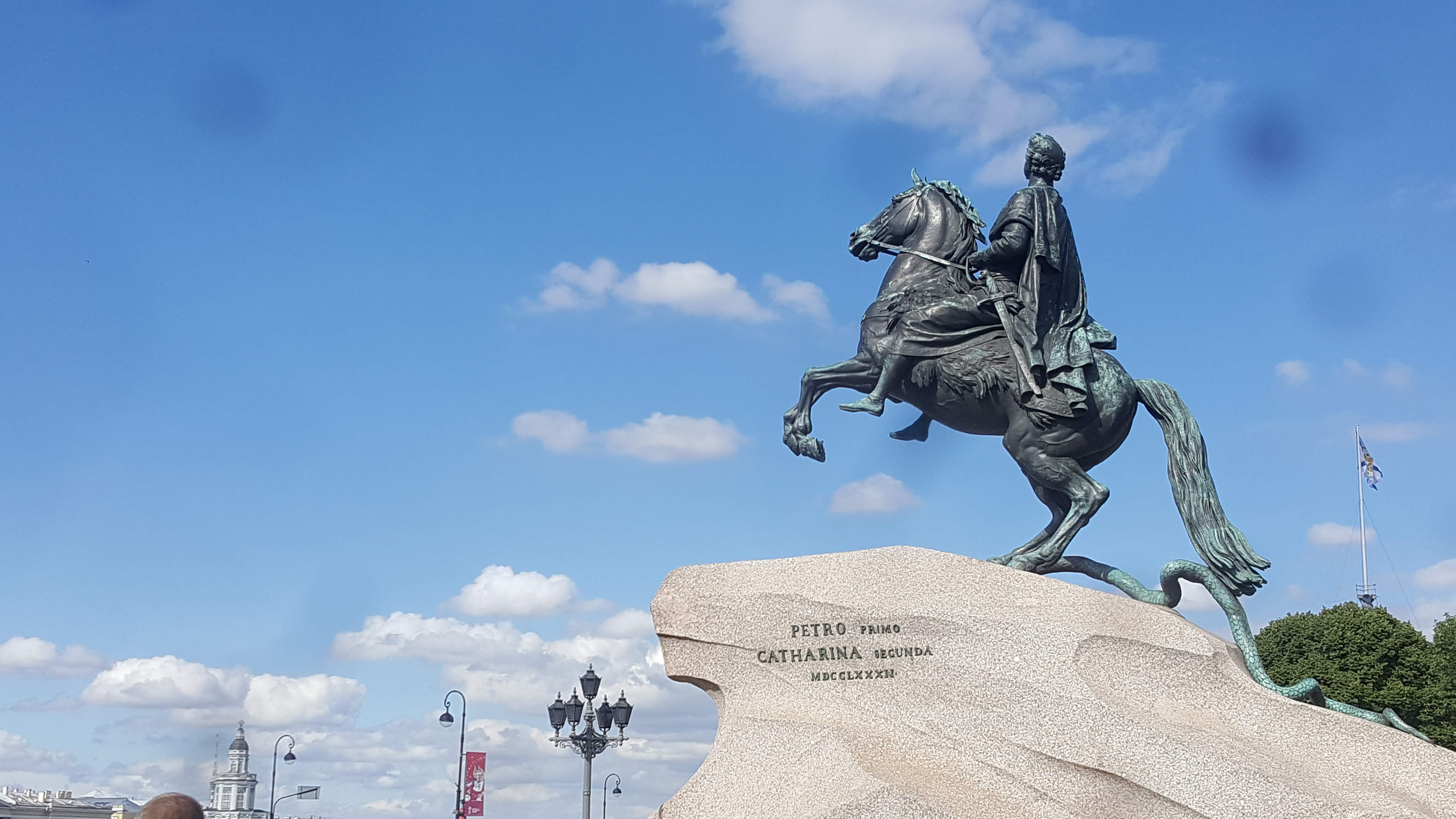
"The Bronze Horseman" in St. Petersburg

A period of statue mania thus ensued in the USSR. Statue mania refers to the mass-proliferation of statues, originated from Western culture in the nineteenth century. During his reign, Joseph Stalin increased Communist propaganda and statues across USSR territories exorbitantly. After Stalin’s death in 1953, Nikitia Khrushchev, his successor, enacted de-Stalinization to end the cult of personality. The amount of intentional involvement that Lenin (and thus the 'original' revolution) had in the development of the cult of personality is a subject of ongoing debate.

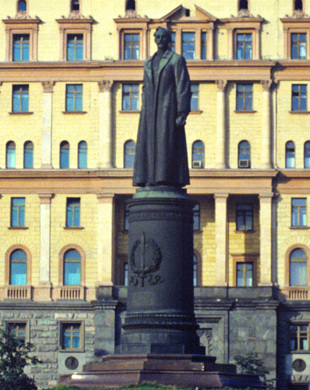
The statue of Felix Dzerzhinsky that was removed in 1991

In 1965 the USSR joined the International Council on Monuments and Sites (ICOMOS) and the All-Russian Society for the Protection of Historical and Cultural Monuments (VOOPIK, Vserossiiskoe obshchestvo okhrany pamiatnikov istorii i kultury). Art historian Maria Silina states that, "since then, an appreciable network of communist heritage sites has been created and still serves as a basis for inventories of heritage objects in Russia."

On October 13, 1990 Mikhail Gorbachev issued a decree "on the prevention of defacing monuments that are linked to the history of the state and its symbols." On August 22, 1991 the statue of Felix Dzerzhinsky outside the KGB headquarters in Moscow was officially authorized to be removed. The removal of this Dzerzhinsky statue, art historian Dario Gamboni argues, was the catalyst for the public to start targeting statues of USSR leaders across Russia.

== History of the site ==
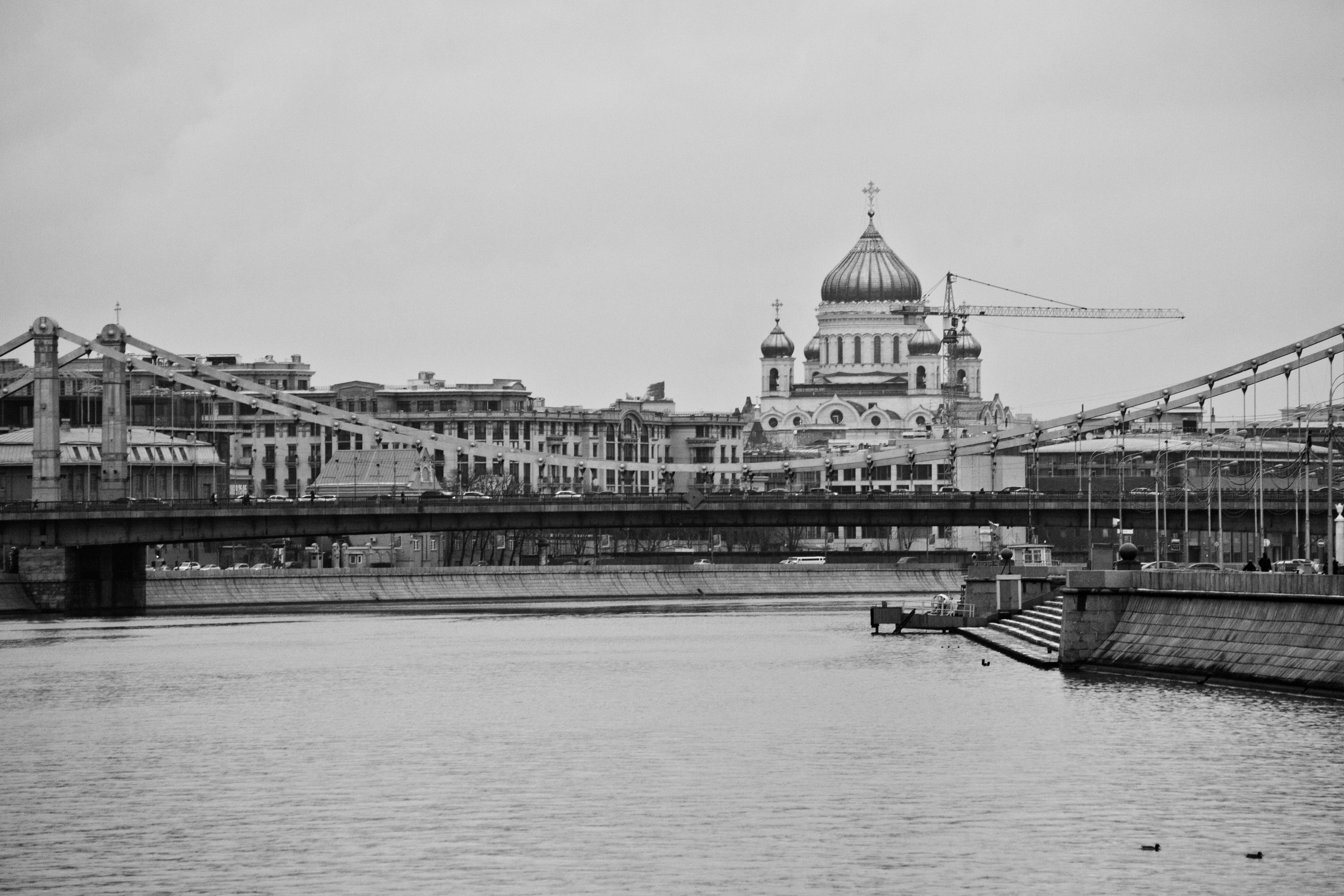
Krymsky Bridge in Moscow

The Muzeon sits on the former site of the All-Russia Agricultural and Industrial Craft Exhibition, which was constructed in 1923. In the middle, young architect Andrei Burov built a soccer stadium. Vladimir Lenin visited the exhibition during his last trip to Moscow, three months before his death. Lenin was driven in a car past pavilions designed by Konstantin Melnikov, Vladimir Shchuko, and Vera Mukhina, before departing for the estate of Gorki, where he died.

The Krymsky Bridge, the first cable-stayed bridge in the Soviet Union, was built under Joseph Stalin in 1938. The granite Krymskaya and Pushkinskaya embankments were laid down shortly thereafter. Until the late 19th century, there had not been any embankments, just river banks reinforced with paving stones.

During the Great Patriotic War (also known as the Eastern Front of World War II) military hardware and anti-aircraft weapons were stationed near Krymsky Bridge. By the late 1940s, a vast, empty space had appeared that became the city's largest snow-dumping ground. Architects proposed different suggestions for this site such as the Academy of Sciences to the Palace of the Soviets, however Culture Minister Yekaterina Furtseva insisted that Central House of Artists be built on the site. Construction on this project broke ground in 1965 amidst wooden shanties. The square around CHA was built in the 1980s.

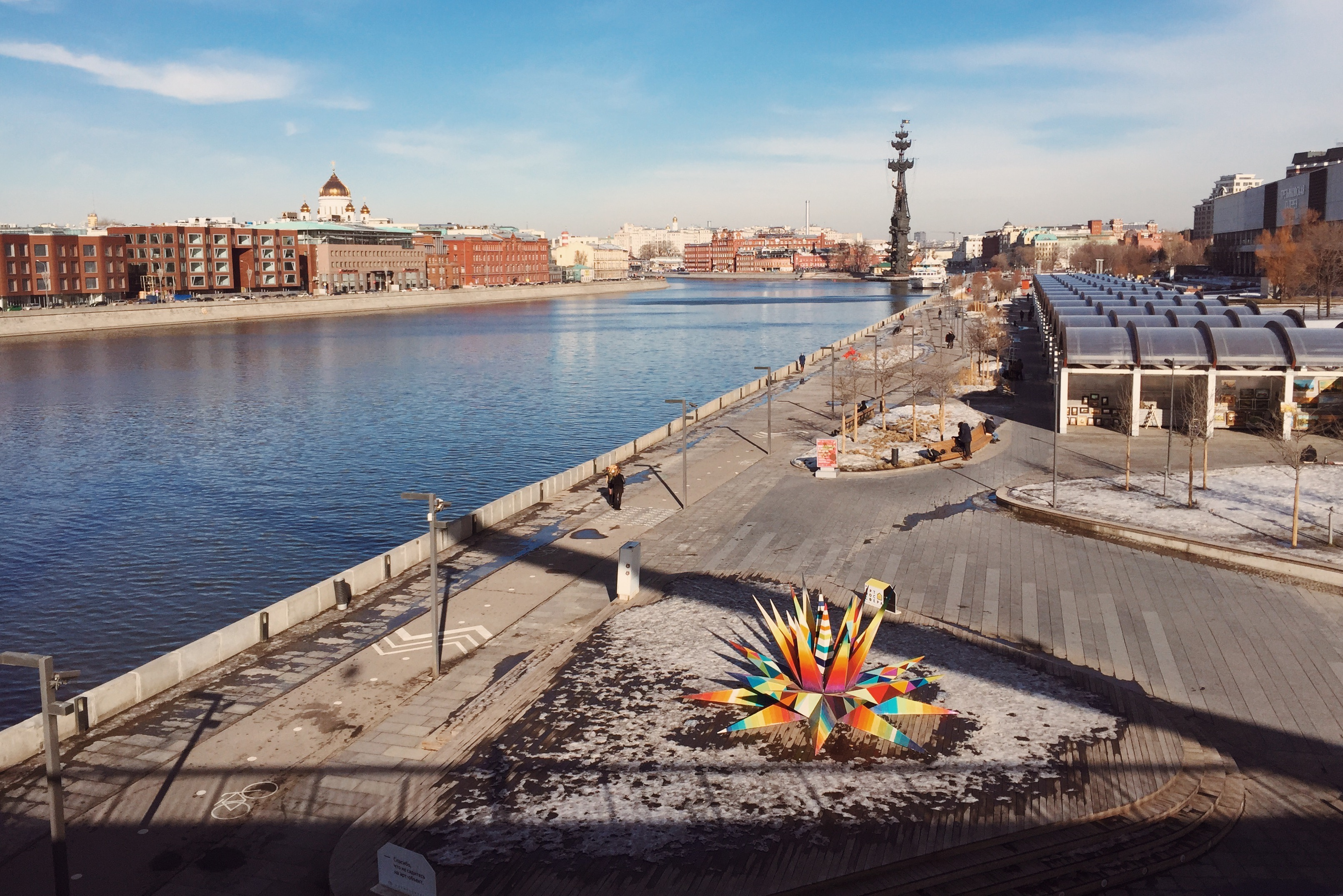
The site of Muzeon, next to the Moskva river

In the late 1980s, at the height of Perestroika, CHA began holding lavish exhibitions by artists such as Francis Bacon, Giorgio Morandi, Jannis Kounellis, Robert Rauschenberg, and James Rosenquist. Sculptures by Western modernists appeared in the adjacent park.

=== After dissolution of the USSR ===
USSR is the Stronghold of Peace statue

On August 22, 1991, the statue of Felix Dzerzhinsky was dismantled and brought to the park. The Communist Party was banned in November of 1991. Busts of Lenin, and statues of Kalinin, Sverdlov, and Stalin from across Moscow started to pile up on the grass–including a pink-granite statue of Stalin, his face smashed by hammer blows. Sculptures were brought in from shuttered sculpture factories, Soviet-era workshops where anonymous artisans manufactured figurines.

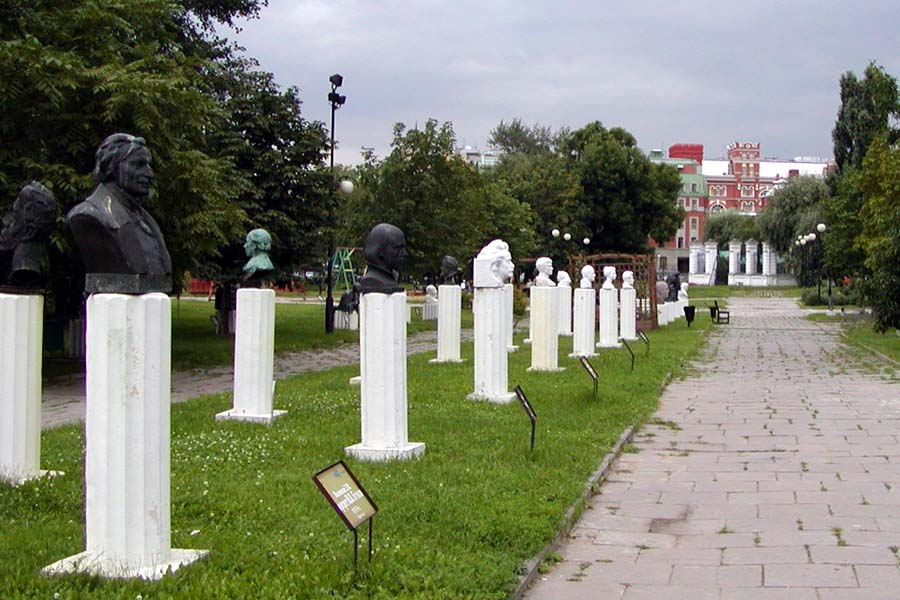
"Portrait row" in Muzeon Park of Arts

In January 1992, Moscow Mayor Yury Luzhkov signed a decree establishing the Muzeon Park of Arts. Gradually, some of the statues were hoisted to their feet and arranged throughout the park, while some still remain in their fallen form. It currently holds over 1,000 sculptures in its collection. It is split into themed sections (i.e. the Oriental Garden, Pushkin Square, Portrait Row). Many of the monuments appeared before 1992. Post-communist tourism driven by Westerners has increased the number of visitors seeking the discarded Soviet monuments. In the 2000s, the park began hosting symposiums for sculptors working with limestone; the sculptures they donated are displayed on a special square reserved for white-stone sculptures. The symposiums featured a wide range of subjects and participants, including professionals such as Fakhraddin Rzayev, Vladimir Buinachev, and Grigory Krasnoshlykov, as well as amateurs.

== Muzeon today ==
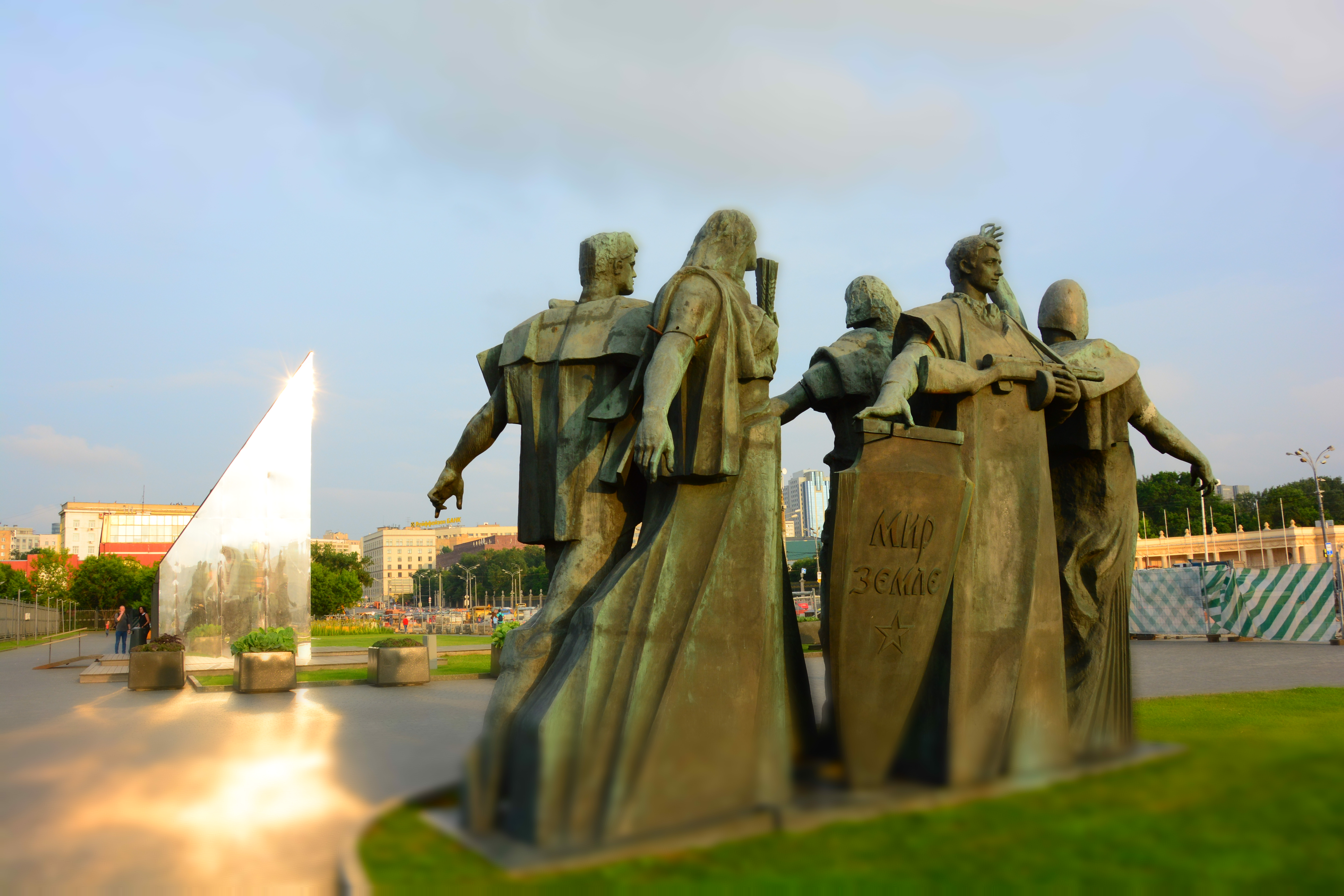
Muzeon at sunset. Photo by Jasmine Halki

Major changes have taken place at Muzeon since 2011. As part of a government program to boost Moscow's tourism and leisure infrastructure, architect Yevgeny Asse developed a new master plan, including a redesigned landscape, for Muzeon that has transformed the park into a dynamic and contemporary space. Makeshift and rickety structures were removed, and a diagonal, winding “promenade” path linking Krymsky Val and Bolotny Island was laid down. Footpaths were resurfaced with granite pavers. The “School” pavilion (designed by architects Igor Chirkin and Alexey Podkidyshev), where Muzeon's education programs are held, was opened. Gentrification in Moscow has led to developers and real-estate agents seeking out sites which have protected status as Bolshevik landmarks for the benefit of increased market value.

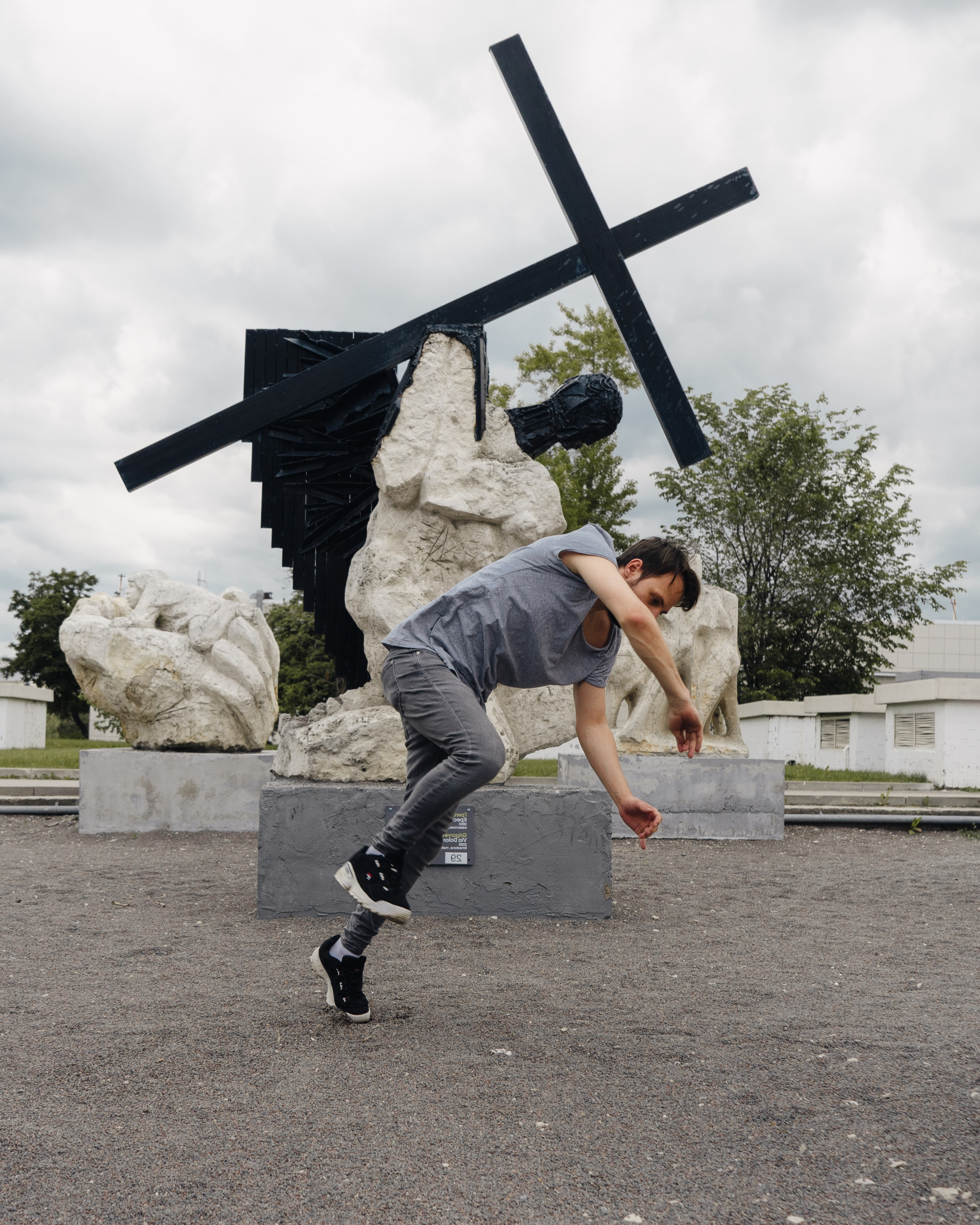
A young man practices tricks in front of a monument

In 2013, following the adoption of a plan by architecture firm “Wowhaus” (Dmitry Likin and Oleg Shapiro) the Krymskaya Embankment was completely rebuilt and turned into a pedestrian area that stretches from the former “Red October” chocolate factory to the Sparrow Hills. Unique perennial flower beds were planted; unobtrusive obstacles for skateboarders and bike lanes were installed along with sleek benches and teardrop-shaped pavilions. A new “Vernisazh” (art exhibition space) with undulating rooftops and spacious, brightly lit stands was built. A splash fountain, Moscow's second, has become a popular attraction.

Muzeon today is not only a place for preserving historical artifacts, but also an open-air contemporary art museum, a special exhibition space, a music festival venue, and a communal creative workshop. It is growing in popularity as a leisure destination amongst Moscovites and is now a part of Gorky Park.

The pink-granite Stalin statue, which originally was displayed on its side, now stands upright and again on a pedestal following an swell in favor for the former USSR leader. An opinion poll from 2019 found that 70 percent of Russians thought that Stalin played a positive role in Russian history, according to the New York Times.

== Responses to Soviet statues ==
Muzeon is part of a broader phenomenon from the 1990s, when former Soviet states began removing monuments of Soviet leaders from public squares, often discarding them in parks. Other examples of monument parks which preserve Socialist statues include the Grūtas Park in Druskininkai, Lithuania, the PRL Museum in Ruda Śląska, Poland, Memento Park in Budapest, Hungary, the Gallery of the Art of Socialist Realism wing in the northern annex of the Kozłówka Palace in Kozłówka, Poland, the Museum of Socialist Art in Sofia, Bulgaria.

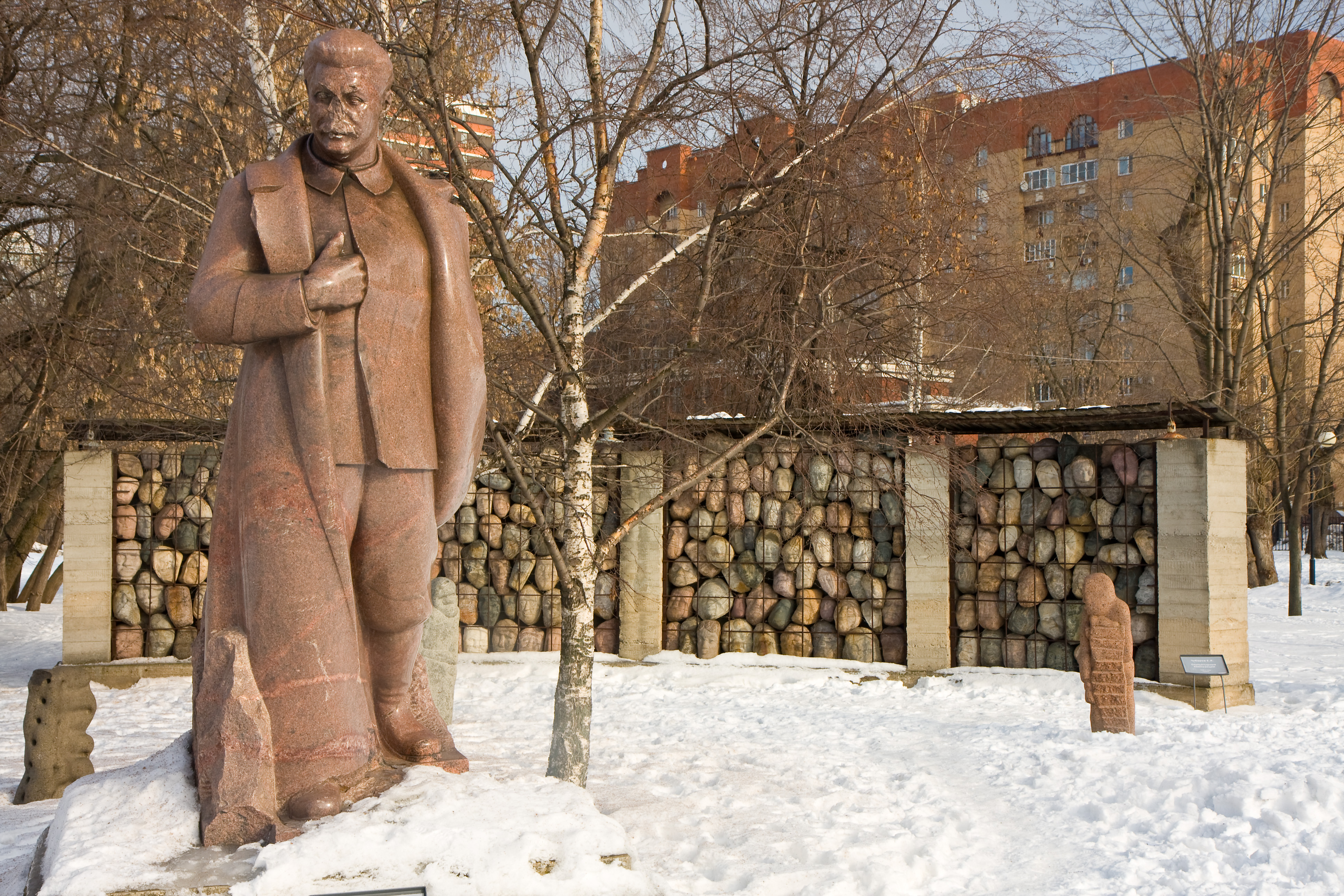
The pink-granite Stalin statue with Chubarov's “Victims of Soviet-Era Prison Camps” monument in the distance. Photo by Garrett Ziegler

Some countries chose to destroy their Soviet statues after the collapse of the USSR. Notable examples include the removal of a monument to Stalin in his birthplace of Gori, Georgia in 2010, the destruction of the largest monument to Lenin in Ukraine at Zaporizhia, Ukraine in 2016, and the toppling of Latvia’s largest Soviet statue (standing 79 meters, or 259 feet 2 inches) in August of 2022.

Erecting counter-monuments is another response to the presence of Soviet monuments. For example, sculptor Evgeny Chubarov’s “Victims of Soviet-Era Prison Camps” displays 282 stone heads in a cage. Chubarov donated this statue to Muzeon on the condition it be displayed next to the pink-granite Stalin statue. Another example is Yerbossyn Meldibekov’s “Transformer” in Tashkent, Uzbekistan, which presents an interchangeable statue intended to represent the shifting identities of post-Soviet states.

== Famous sculptors ==
=== Vera Mukhina ===
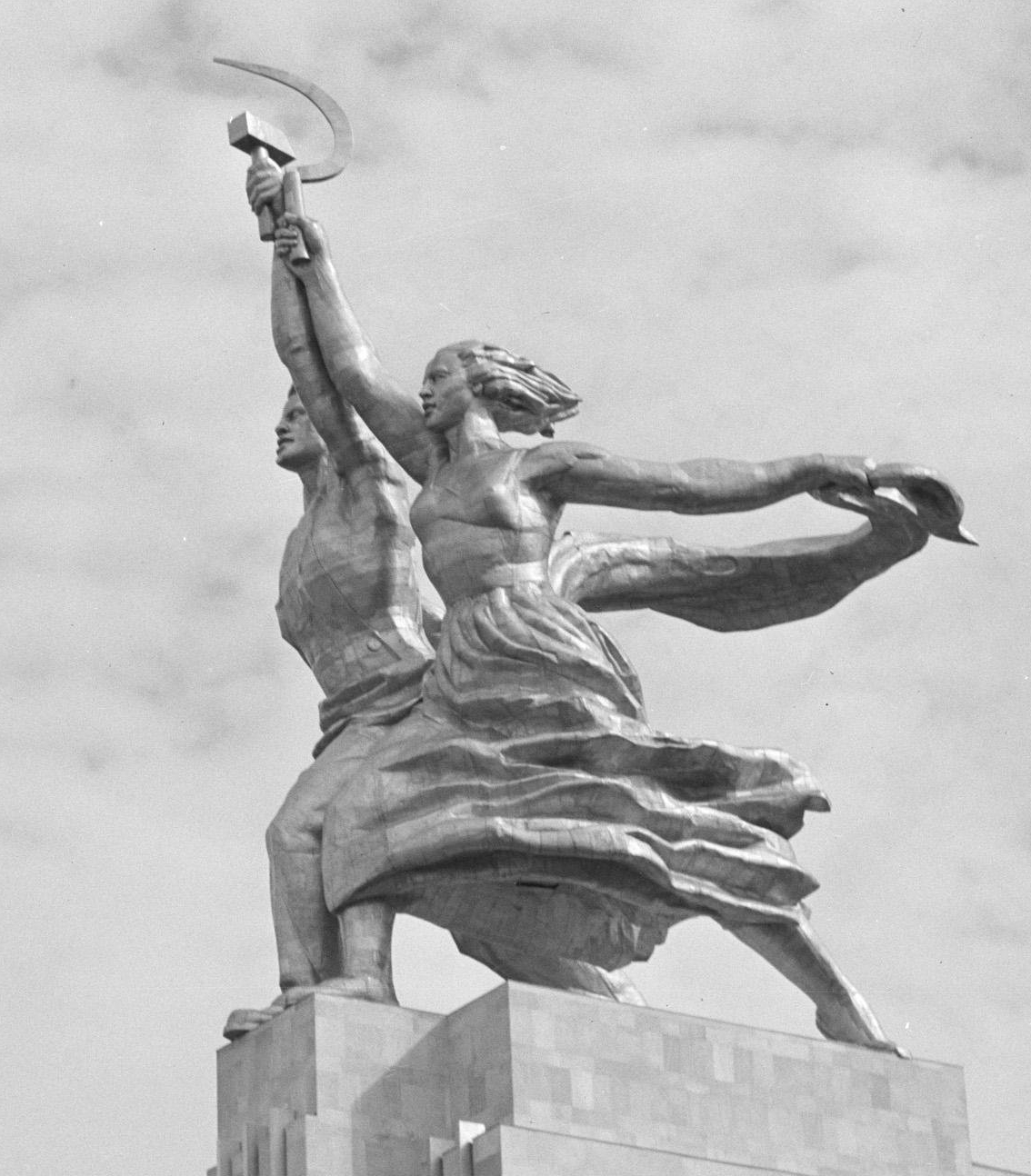
"Worker and Kolkhoz Woman" by Vera Mukhina

Vera Mukhina was a 20th-century artist and highly-acclaimed female sculptor from the Soviet Union. Many know her as the artist behind “Worker and Kolkhoz Woman,” one of the country's most enduring symbols. Mukhina herself was a complicated person: a semi-official sculptor and believer in the “new religion” (i.e. of the revolution), as well as a subtle artist who parted with illusions early on.

Mukhina's connections to the theater found expression in the fine arts. We demand peace! (1950), inspired by the conflict between North and South Korea, looks like a mise-en-scène: a masculine Russian soldier, dark-skinned youth with clenched fists, blind man, and a Korean mother holding a baby walk across the banners of a defeated army into a bright future behind a woman releasing a dove. Every contemporary cliché is here; Mukhina's intention was to make a propagandistic sculpture.

Art historian Mikhail Alpatov has called the work cold and contrived, arguing that the artist, “couldn’t communicate the idea of fighting for peace in the language of art, which would have allowed her express herself through her work.” Today, however, the sculpture is valuable for a different reason; it is an example of exuberant, semi-official art and an important monument to the era that produced it. Mukhina's ingenuitive use electroplating reduced the statue's weight to enable transporting it between cities and countries.

=== Yevgeny Vuchetich ===
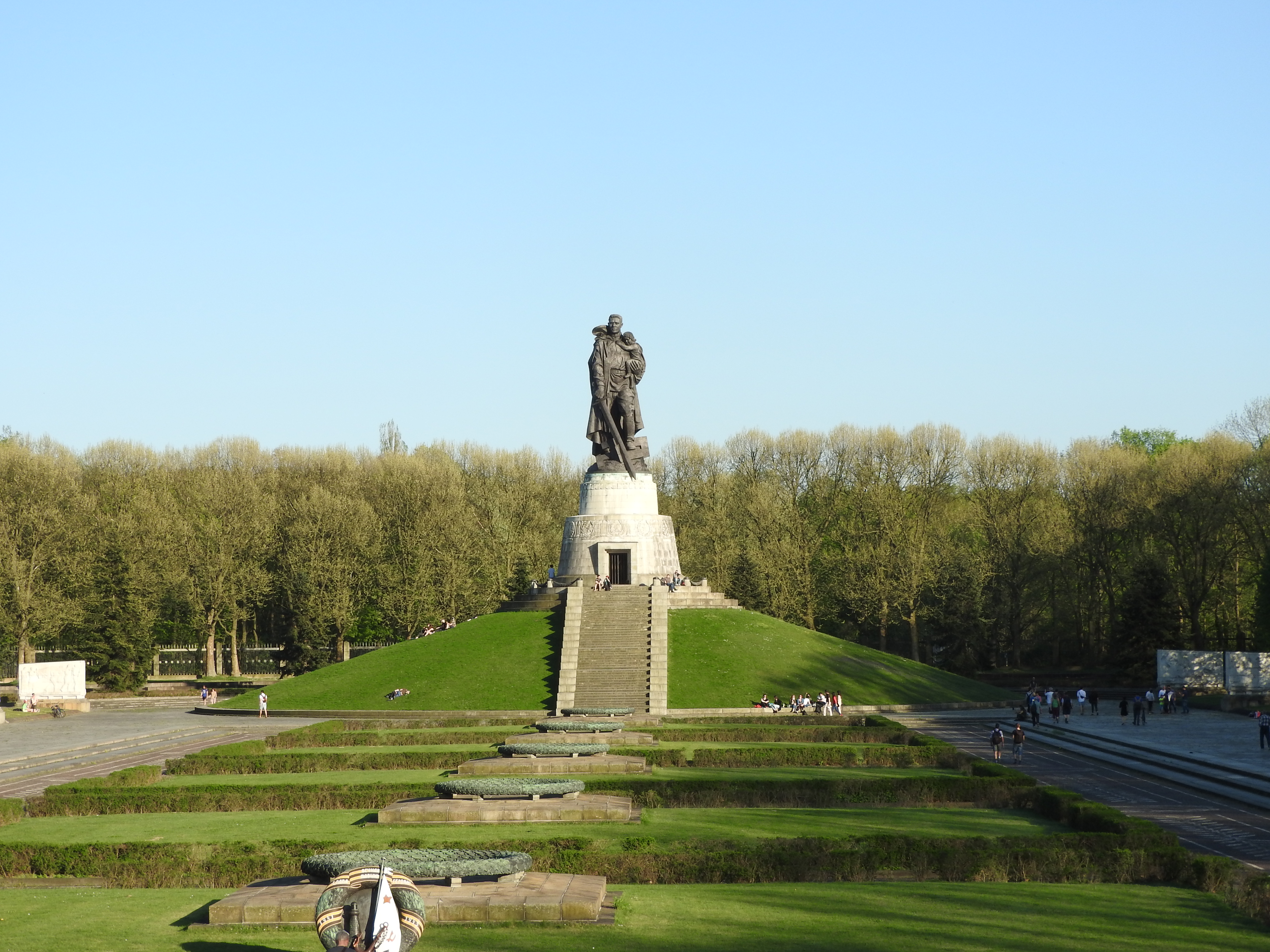
Soviet War Memorial in Berlin's Treptower Park

Yevgeny Vuchetich was one of the first well-known sculptors in the Soviet Union to have received an exclusively Soviet education. Vuchetich was extremely prolific, sculpting dozens of official portraits of Soviet heroes. Vuchetich's sculptures are too numerous to be the work of one man, but it is unclear how many assistants he employed. The only recorded knowledge of his assistants is that in the early 1960s he invited sculptor Vadim Sidur to join him as an apprentice.

Vuchetich's rise was swift. By the end of the World War II, he had already received a commission to create a sculpture group honoring the late General Yefremov (completed in 1946), and was put in charge of designing the Soviet War Memorial in Berlin's Treptower Park. The story of the monument dedicated to General Yefremov is shrouded in mystery.

== See also ==
- Coronation Park, Delhi, where many British Indian monuments are stored.
- Grūtas Park, in Lithuania, known colloquially as "Stalin World"
- Memento Park, in Budapest, Hungary
- De-Stalinization
- Chiang Kai-shek statues
