= Krymsky Val =

Street in Moscow, Russia

Coordinates: 55°43′49.0″N 37°36′39″E

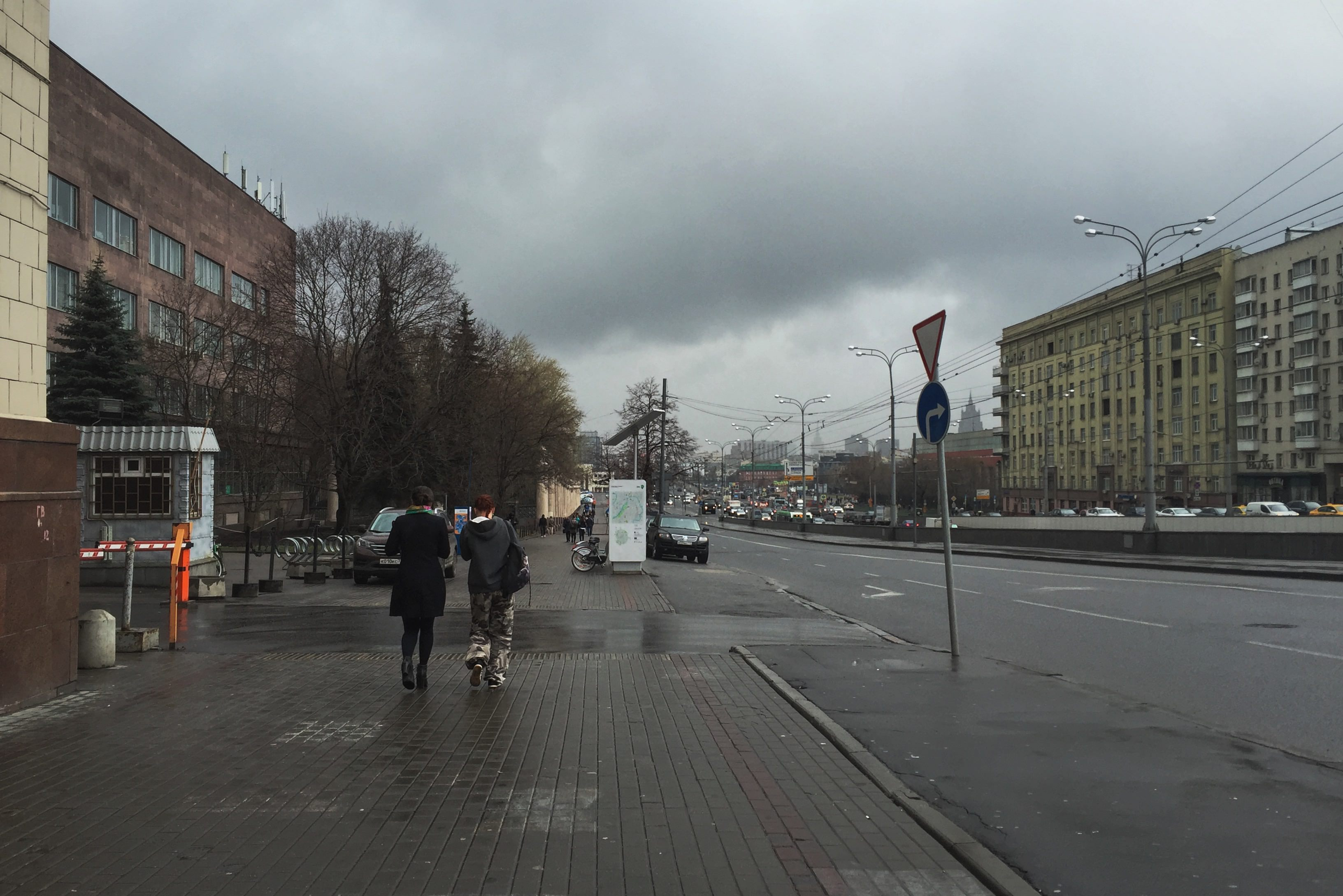
- Location: Moscow, Russia

Krymsky Val (Russian: Кры́мский Вал) is a street in the Yakimanka District of Moscow, on the Garden Ring near Gorky Park. Moscow Metro stations nearby are Park Kultury and Oktyabrskaya. Also close are the Krymsky Bridge, Fallen Monument Park and Tretyakov Gallery.

== External links and reference ==
- Reference to the Treyakov
