= Krymsky Bridge =

Steel suspension bridge in Moscow, Russia

Coordinates: 55°44′02″N 37°35′56″E

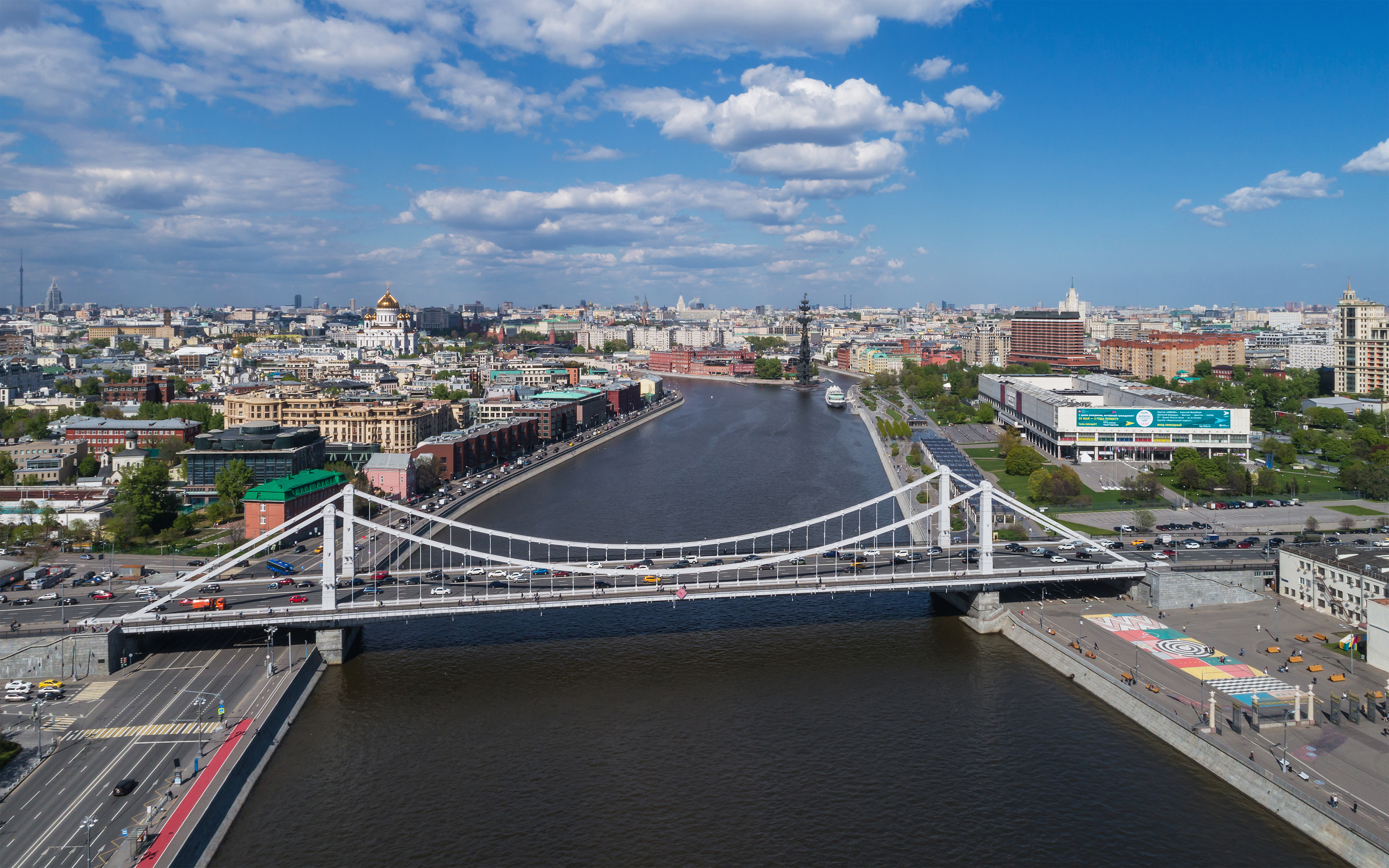
The Krymsky Bridge in 2017. The New Tretyakov Gallery of 20th-Century Art is visible behind the bridge on the right

Krymsky Bridge (Russian: Крымский мост) is a steel suspension bridge in Moscow. The bridge spans the Moskva River 1,800 metres south-west from the Kremlin and carries the Garden Ring across the river. The bridge links the Zubovsky Boulevard to the north-west with Krymsky Val street to the south-east. The nearby Moscow Metro stations are Park Kultury and Oktyabrskaya.

The existing bridge was completed on 1 May 1938, as part of Joseph Stalin's ambitious reconstruction of downtown Moscow. Designed by engineer V. P. Konstantinov and architect A. V. Vlasov, it is the fourth bridge on this site and the only suspension bridge in all of Moscow.

== History ==
The first pontoon Krymsky Bridge was built in wood in 1786. Subsequently, it was rebuilt as a fixed wooden causeway with a 15-metre central span for barges. Both wooden bridges were frequently damaged by ice and floods, and had to be repaired on numerous occasions.

The first steel bridge, built in 1873 by Amand Struve to a design by V. K. Speyer, featured two 64-meter truss boxes, supported by the central pillar. Traffic moved inside the truss, which was congested and unsafe. Tram companies issued a rule that only one tram can be on a bridge at a time, to prevent traffic deadlocks.

During Stalin's reconstruction of Moscow, every bridge in the downtown was either rebuilt or scheduled for demolition. The Krymsky Bridge was slated to be replaced in 1935. The old bridge had to operate until the substitute was completed, because the Soviet capital could not afford interruption of service along the Garden Ring. Between 21 May and 26 May 1936, the old bridge was moved fifty meters from its site on temporary pillars. For the first time in Soviet history a 4000-ton, 128-meter structure was relocated successfully. The old bridge was in operation until the new bridge was completed on May 1, 1938.

== Modern bridge ==
The bridge's total length (including approach ramps) is 668 meters, with the bridge itself being 262.5 meters and it spanning 47.25, 168, and another 47.25 meters. Its full width is 38.4 meters. The bridge has a 24-meter road (6 lanes) and two 5-meter pedestrian lanes.

The eyebar chains are made of SDS steel (СДС, Steel [for the] Palace of the Soviets) rolled by NKMZ works, each link consisting of 4-centimeter thick, 93-centimeter wide strips. Chains are carrying two girders (each over 300 meters long), with their ends anchored to massive concrete counterweights. The girders are crossed with 50-centimeter I-beams, spaced by 1.6 meters; these beams are covered with a concrete deck.

The bridge was represented on Soviet postage stamps twice: in March 1939 and December 1948. Visually unique, Krymsky Bridge is one of the least effective in terms of material costs. It consumed nearly 10,000 tons of steel, or 1 metric ton per square metre of deck (itself having a very low ratio of area usage, 24 to 38.4).

The bridge deck was replaced in 2001. During repairs, traffic was restricted, but never closed completely.
