= First Snow =

First Snow may refer to:

- The First Snow, a 1947 Terrytoons short with Mighty Mouse
- First Snow (1958 film), a South Korean film directed by Kim Ki-young
- First Snow (2006 film), a German/American film starring Guy Pearce and Piper Perabo
- First Snow (2012 film), a Canadian film directed by Michaël Lalancette
- "First Snow", a song by Dave Holland from Jumpin' In, 1984
- The First Snow" (painting), painting by the Soviet artist Arkady Plastov
