= Spring (Plastov painting) =

1954 painting by Soviet artist Arkady Plastov

- Artist: Arkady Plastov
- Year: 1954
- Type: Oil on canvas
- Dimensions: 210 cm × 123 cm (83 in × 48 in)
- Location: Tretyakov Gallery, Moscow

Spring (Russian: Весна) is a painting by the Russian Soviet artist Arkady Plastov. He was assisted by his son Nikolai, who had graduated from the Moscow Surikov State Academic Institute of Fine Arts a year earlier. The painting was created during summer and fall of 1954, first in the village of Prislonikha in the Ulyanovsk region, where Arkady Plastov was born, and later in the artist's studio in Moscow.

The painting depicts a naked young woman dressing a little girl in the open hall of a village bathhouse under the rare spring snow. The painting was shown at the very beginning of the Khrushchev Thaw and made a strong impression on experts and public in general. The female nudity had long been poorly represented in Soviet painting. The unusual subject provoked contradictory opinions. In particular, the artist was accused of wanting to depict the naked female body in order to show the audience the poverty of peasant life in his contemporary kolkhoz village. Currently, the painting forms part of the New Tretyakov Gallery collection and permanent exhibition. It was presented many times at exhibitions in museums of the USSR, modern Russia, as well as abroad.

Spring is considered to be one of the best Arkady Plastov's works, and at various times it attracted the attention of important local art historians, cultural researchers, historians and writers. According to Inga Filippova, a candidate of art history, within the genre painting the artist created an image of "divine beauty". Art historian Ariadna Zhukova called the painting Spring "one of the most poetic and pure representations of a woman in our painting".

== Description ==
Plastov chose a subject where nudity seems natural to the viewer: a young woman in the open anteroom of a village bathhouse dressing a little girl. The artist combines the naked body of a young woman with "pink — nacre tones" and russet hair with the gray wooden walls, the soot-blackened door of the bathhouse, and the warm golden straw on the floor of the anteroom. The heroine's face looks like she is alive, and her body and hands move in a way that looks like they belong together. Snowflakes, white stars, are woven into the golden hair of the woman dressing the girl, melting on her heated "pearly pink" naked body. The main character of the painting is the perfect example of all that is beautiful in youth, with inner richness and outer charm. Using a simple everyday motif, the artist created, in the words of a Soviet art historian, the image of youth, full of femininity and purity.

According to the artist and art historian Igor Dolgopolov, the nosed girl with red bangs peeking out from under a woman's shawl was biting her lip. According to the artist's biographer Alexander Avdonin-Biryuchevsky, the girl "pressed her lips together and turned up her nose in pleasure". Some researchers, including Alexander Avdonin—Biryuchevsky, who knew the artist intimately, referred to the figures in the painting as mother and daughter. Evelina Polishchuk, a researcher at the State Tretyakov Gallery, perceived them as sisters. The same opinion was expressed by Arkady Plastov's contemporary art historian Alexander Kamensky.

The young woman in the painting becomes the personification of the Russian spring. The literal "interpretation" of the painting (a naked girl dressing the girl after the bath) is overlaid with the "subtext" (the beauty of youth, its energy, life — affirming pathos). The allegorical character is given to the picture by the Russian nature. The landscape in the painting is poetic: a gray shroud of clouds covers the sky, large snowflakes are falling, the earth is being cleared of snow. The household objects depicted in the painting are emphatically material: cold "heavy" water in a bucket, a brightly polished copper basin. Transferring the scene to the interior would turn the canvas into a purely genre painting, which does not lend itself to broad generalizations and associations.

== History ==
=== Background ===
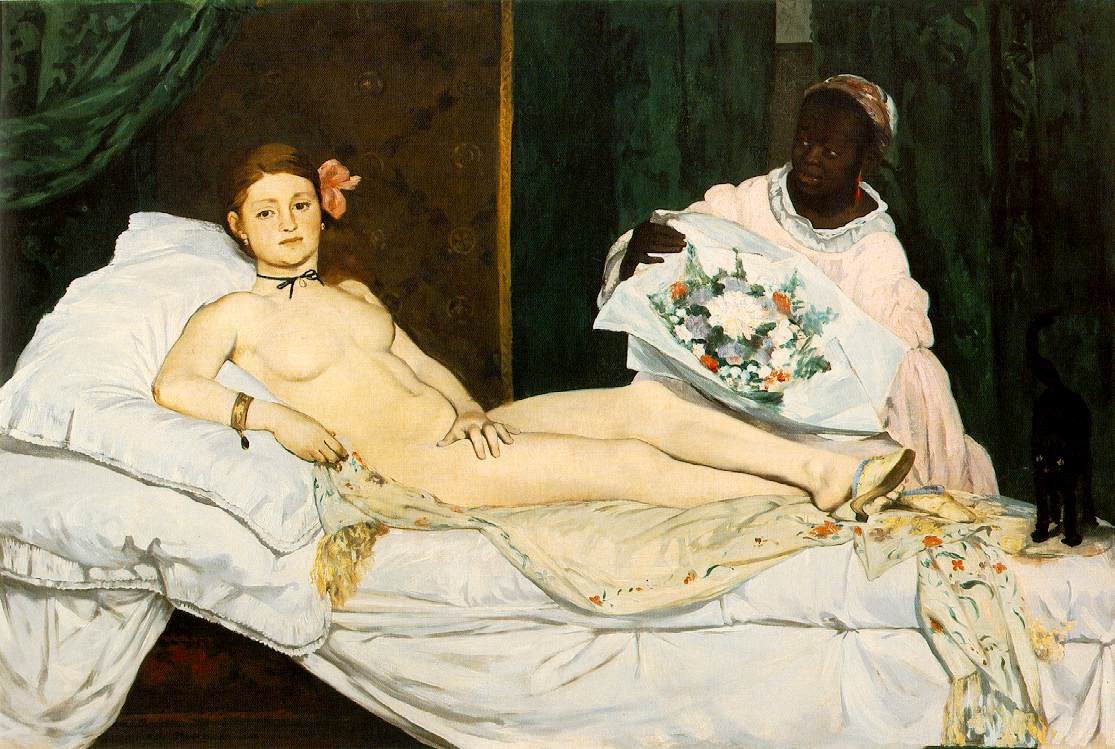
Édouard Manet. Olympia, 1863, Musée d'Orsay, Paris

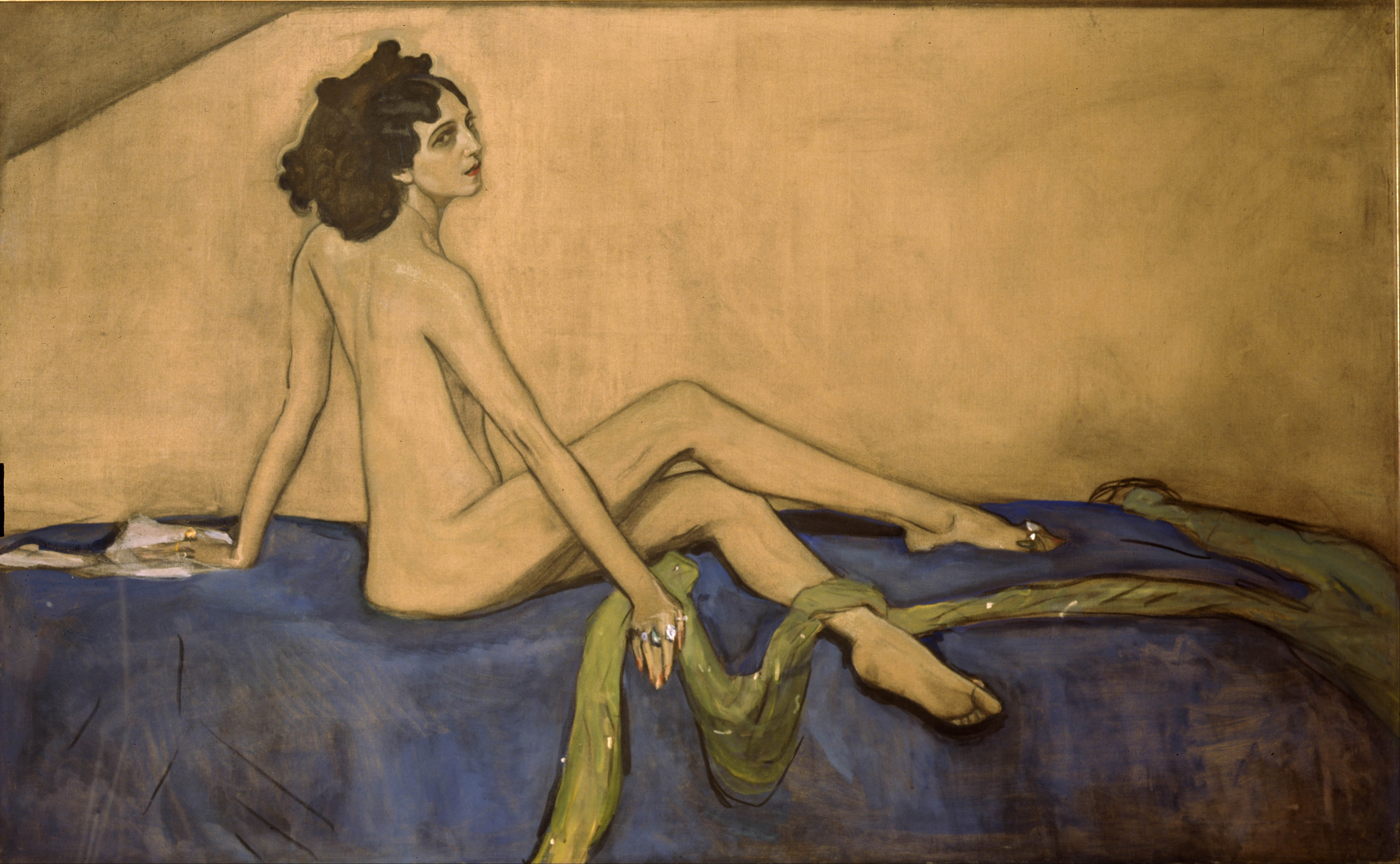
Valentin Serov. Ida Rubinstein, 1910, Russian Museum, St. Petersburg

According to his sister-in-law, the artist Elena Kholodilina, Arkady Plastov treated spring with joy. During the winter he lived in Moscow, and in the spring he would come to his small home —the village of Prislonikha, Ulyanovsk region— and of necessity he himself would take out the second frames in the house and open the windows. This action was like a ritual.

In the early 1950s, Plastov became a fully-fledged artist. His style changed, and he stopped painting social topics. After the expressiveness of the 1930s paintings, which were full of "passion and fury," and after the dramatic Haymaking and Harvest paintings from the 1940s, Plastov started painting in a way that showed harmony between people and the world. His paintings from the 1950s and 1960s, in the words of one art critic, showed "an intimate, passionate whisper of the artist's soul". The artist's genre paintings of everyday life, while still having a narrative and everyday basis, took on a new quality and moved to another level that was associated with metaphorical poetic embodiment.

For a long time, there were not many naked female bodies in Soviet painting. Nude paintings in pre-revolutionary salons were often full of coarse or subtle eroticism, but they did not meet the goal set for the art of the new era. The art of the new era was supposed to carry advanced ideas of modernity. Plastov was one of the first artists to bring the image of the naked female body back to Soviet painting. His early experiments in this genre are the paintings Saturday and Tractor Drivers, which were created during the Second World War, in 1942–1943.One of the goals of the nude genre is to find the ideal of physical and spiritual beauty, and Plastov followed the anti-academic tradition in achieving this goal. Examples of this tradition include Edouard Manet's Olympia and Valentin Serov's Ida Rubinstein. Evgenia Yarkova, a researcher at the Tretyakov Gallery, said that Arkady Plastov's own understanding of beauty was different from the generally accepted idea of beauty. The artist refused to follow the ideal of antiquity or the Renaissance; he portrayed a real person — his contemporary. The object of admiration is not the heroine's appearance, but the harmony in the relationship between a woman and a child, the joy of their existence and communication.

=== Conceptualization and approach ===
There is an opinion that the main idea of the painting Spring refers to 1944, and the beginning of the artist's work on it — in January 1945 (for most of the war, Plastov lived in his native Prislonikha). On January 5, Arkady Alexandrovich wrote to his wife from Moscow: "4 days ago I made a watercolor sketch of the painting for which I've been making sketches of you for a whole year — it's a naked woman dressing a child in the anteroom, in the summer it will be necessary to do it". The author managed to finish the painting only in 1954. According to some sources, his son Nikolai Arkadyevich helped the artist with the painting.

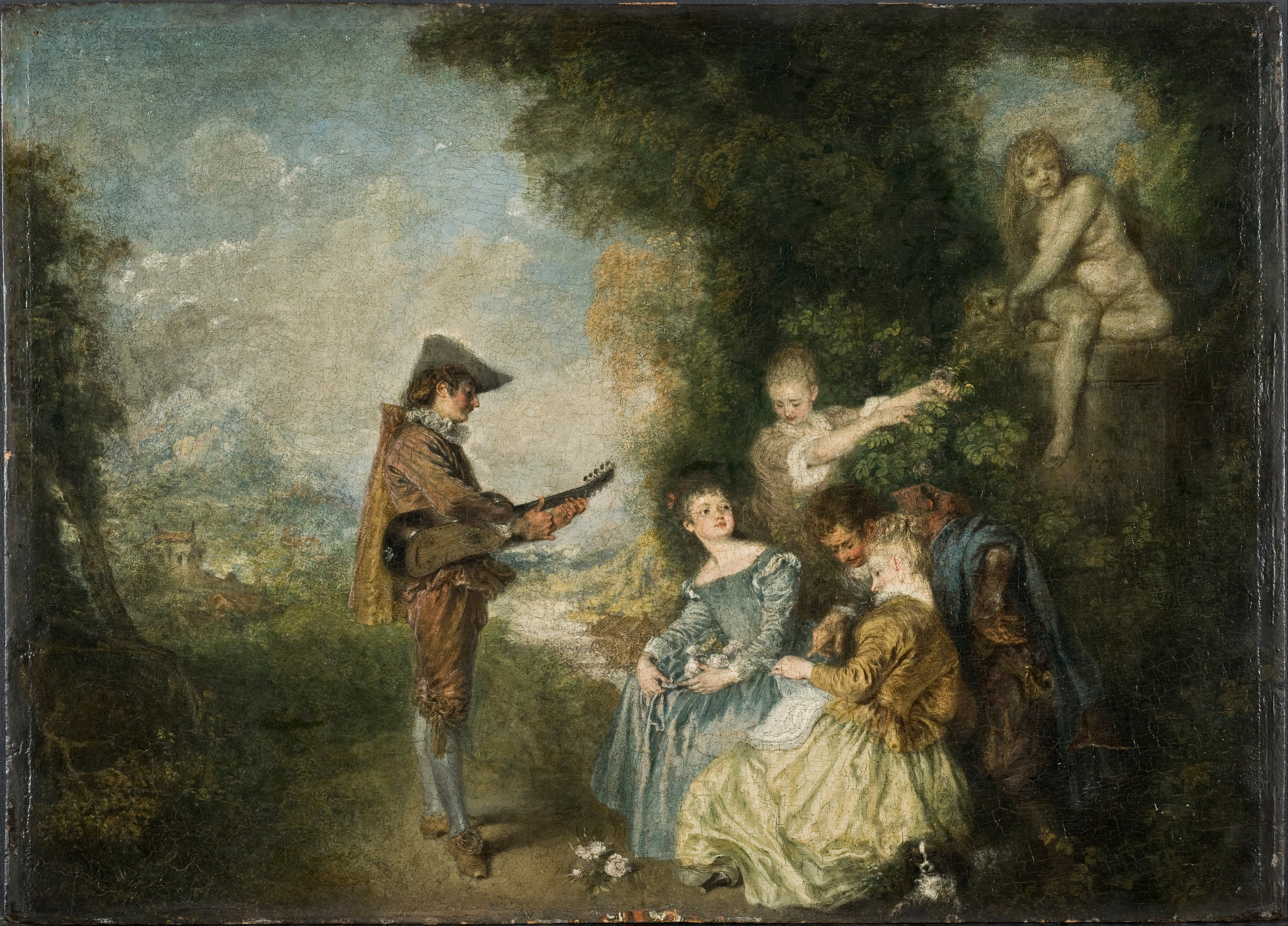
Antoine Watteau. The Lesson of Love, 1716—1717

Tatyana Plastova, a student of philology, traced the origins of the idea for the painting Spring back to an earlier time — to the so-called bath plot in the artist's work of the 1930s. It is documented in Arkady Plastov's sketches in a variety, but everywhere at that time was conceptualized by the artist as a domestic sketch. Among these works is Sketch No. 1 (according to Plastova's classification; paper, watercolor, whitewash, pencil, 23,5×17 cm, is in the private collection of the artist's family), which the researcher correlates with the future painting Spring. It depicts a naked female figure dressing a child in the presence of a fully dressed man (he wears a coat, hat and boots). The scene is set in a bathhouse. After the sketch, which probably seemed to the artist to be successful, there were several sketches and watercolors from life with similar themes, for which Plastov's wife and son Kolya posed. According to the researcher, the "bath scene" itself, which has a purely domestic character, was postponed for a long time, but the figure of a woman dressing a child from this composition attracted his attention and remained in his creative plans.

In 1943, Arkady Plastov painted Saturday (canvas, oil, 113×160.5 cm). It depicted the "pastoral" background of a rural winter landscape with a figure of a girl running out of the bathhouse. She is naked, with only her head covered by a jacket, and a shy smile on her face. Plastova correlated this canvas with the works of French artists of the Rococo period, in particular with the paintings of Antoine Watteau and Nicolas Lancret. She believes that in the process of simultaneous work on this painting and the painting Tractor Drivers (1943—1944, canvas, oil, 129.5×175.5 cm, depicting two women undressing near a stream and a teenager watching them from a distance against the background of a field and a tractor stopped at a short distance), Platsov returned to a matured idea of the 1930s.

Sketch No. 2 (paper, watercolor, pencil, whitewash, 19×22 cm) dates from 1945, not taking place in the bathhouse, but near it, and the artist hinting at a spring landscape with snow still on the ground, and the female figure dressed like a boy of 5—6 years. Plastova suggests that the girl appeared in the painting later under the influence of Titian's painting The Three Ages of Man (c. 1512—1514, oil on canvas, 90×150.7 cm, Scottish National Gallery), with her introduction leading to a doubling of femininity. She noted that in comparison with other canvas paintings, for Spring the artist did not do much preparatory work. The main work on the canvas itself took place in the summer of 1954 in Prislonikha (there the picture was "solved and thoroughly described") and in the fall in Moscow ("Kolya stretched my Bath Hall, and here it is now on the easel, and all Prislonikha, as alive, again before my eyes", — Platsov to his wife on November 21, 1954).

Sketches in the album № 21 belong to this period, with sketches of female figures, and their head and hands. Sketch No. 5 (paper, watercolor, gouache, whitewash, 30.5×19 cm) for the painting is dated August 1954. It is intended for transfer to canvas, so it is divided into squares. It has serious differences from the previous preparatory works: an additional space is added at the top-right; the other space is removed, and the household objects arranged differently. The painting has acquired a vertical character, and the figures have become the semantic center of the composition. However, there is no landscape behind the heroes' backs, with the role of background for them is played by the boarded wall of the vestibule, above which there is only space for the sky.

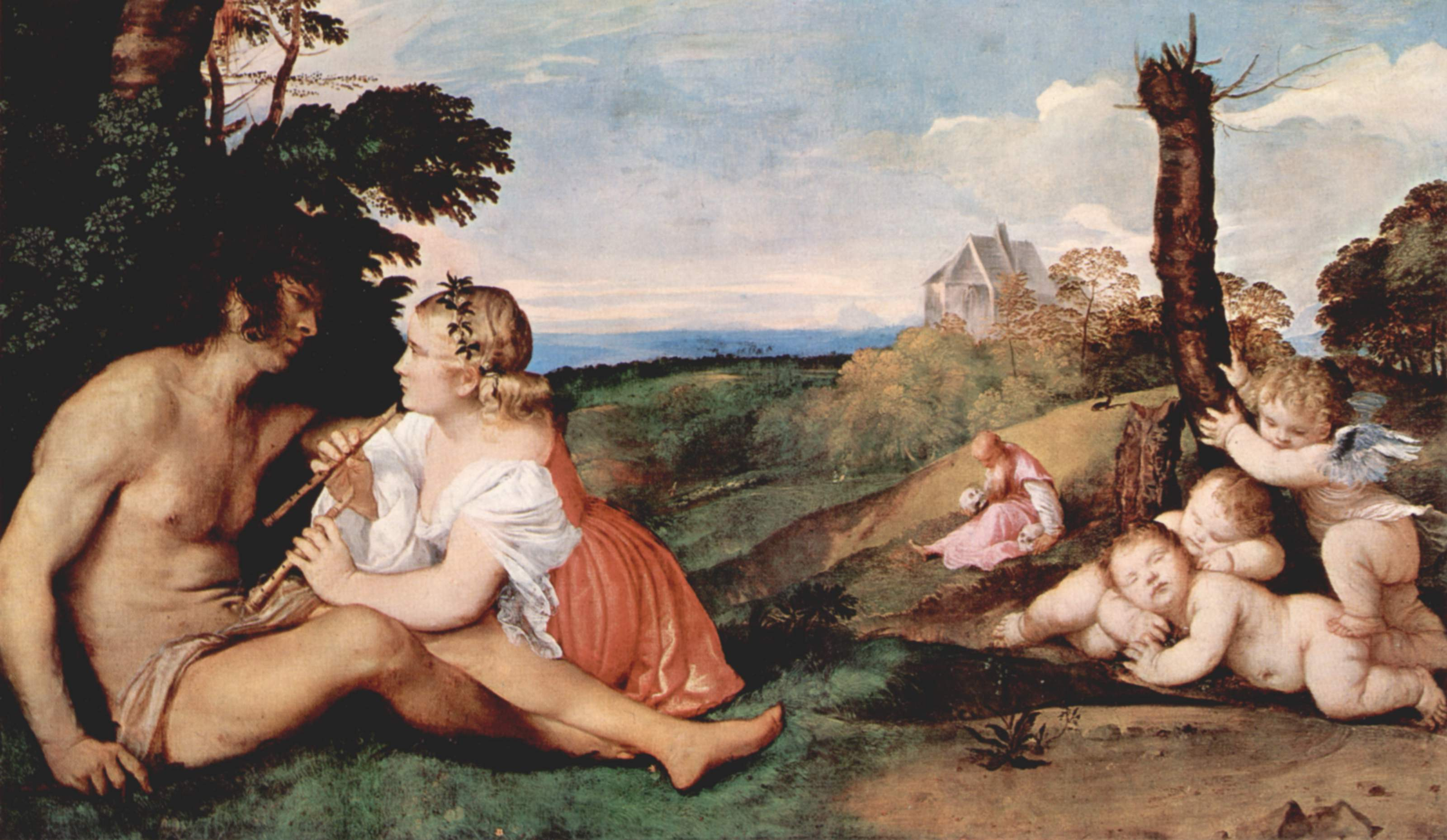
Titian. The Three Ages of Man, ca. 1512—1514

A number of preparatory works for the painting have not survived, but they were captured on photographs: Drawing in charcoal on canvas (August 1954, Plastov family collection), Beginning of work in oil (September 1954, Plastov family collection). There are also variants of the canvas that remained only in the plans. For example, in one of them (Sketch No. 4, paper, watercolor, whitewash, 27×19 cm, Plastov family collection) the action takes place not in early spring, but in summer. Tatyana Plastov noted its decorativeness. Arkady Plastov was not satisfied with the result and invited a sitter. Tatyana Plastova believes that there were two sitters. Working with them, the artist solved two problems: the position of the woman's body in the picture and the perspective. With one of them —Zoya Burdenko— the artist made photographs and sketches. With the second model Plastov made a watercolor, and from the watercolor he made sketches. All this removed his doubts about the pose of the female figure on the canvas and allowed him to approach the ideal image of this character. After working with the models, the artist returned to the painting Spring. At that time, according to the art historian, Plastov finally abandoned stereotypes, both his own and those inherent in the painting of his time, and changed the stylistics and "plastic language" of the image of a woman — from a genre painting canvas turned into a metaphor. According to Plastova, the image of the woman turned out to be devoid of individual and portrait characteristics.

Tatiana Plastova quoted in her article a letter from the artist dated January 1, 1955, from which she concluded that the artist gave the title to the canvas after the work on it had been completed, and that Plastov continued to make some changes to the almost finished canvas: "In the studio happy from my Holiday, as I called my fair [the author refers to the painting Holiday (1953—1967, canvas, oil, Ulyanovsk Regional Art Museum)], and Spring, as outlined to call my naked. Slowly and in it a lot of improvements and very important, and it now looks incomparably better than at home [in Prislonikha or, perhaps, in the Moscow apartment of the artist]".

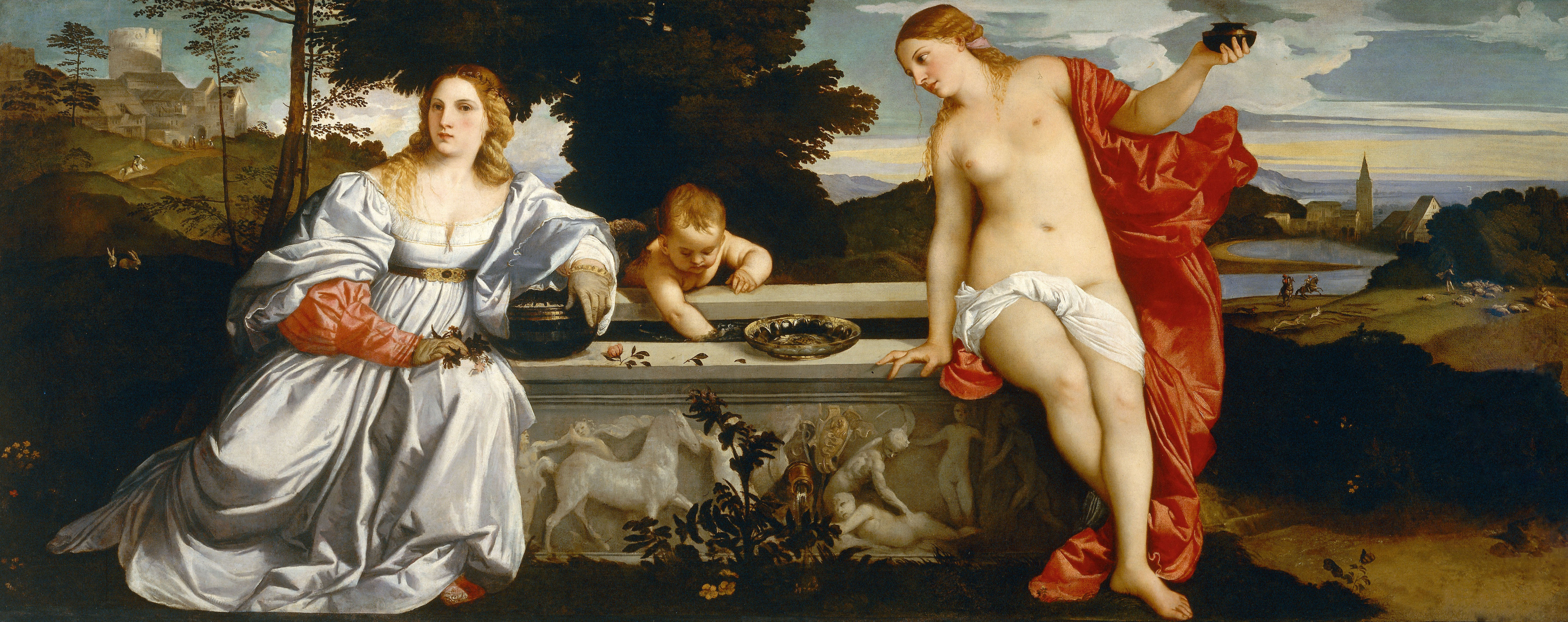
Titian. Sacred and Profane Love, 1514

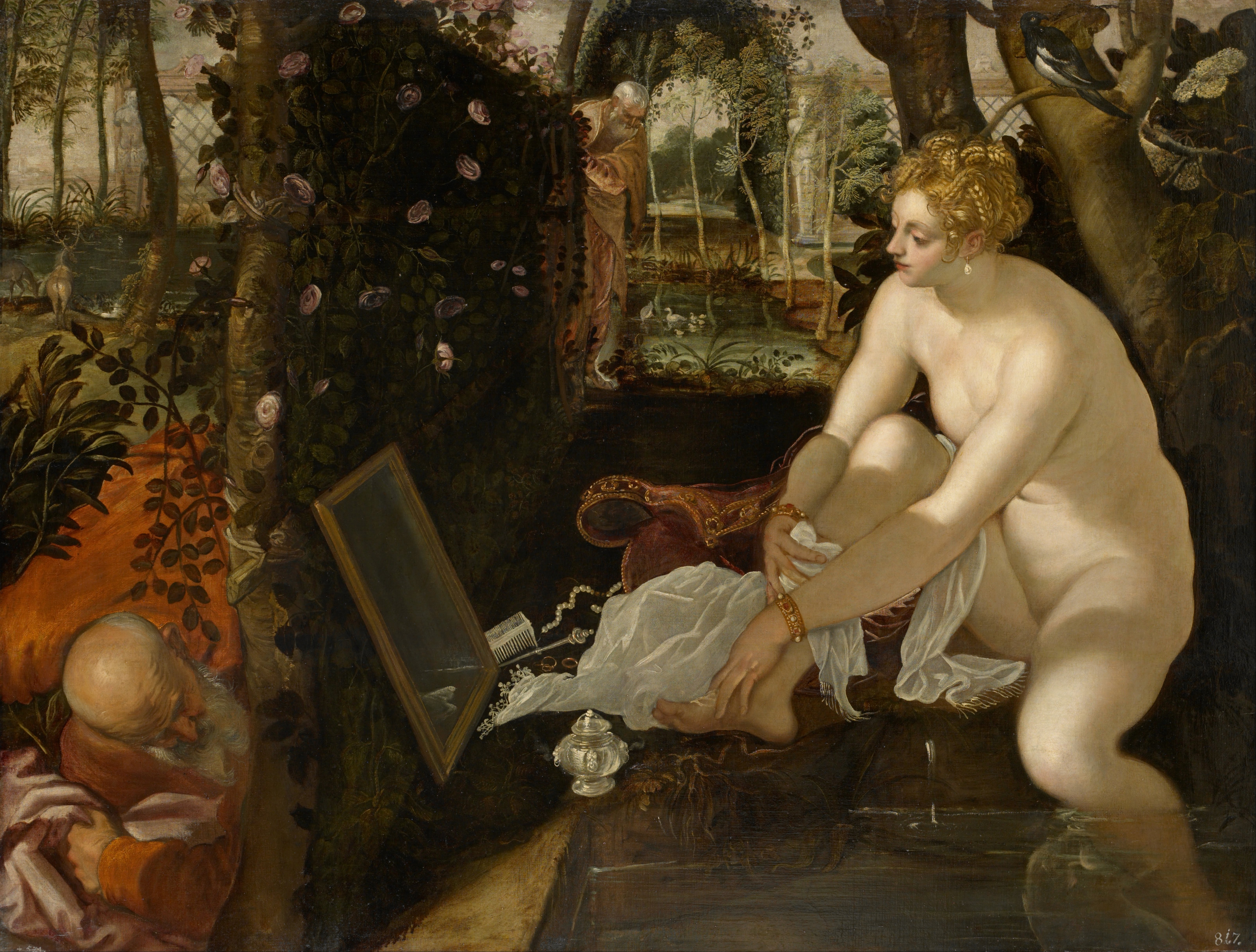
Tintoretto. Susanna and the Elders, 1555—1556

The contemporary researcher Tatiana Plastova pointed out that the plasticity of the figure goes back to the type of sculptural composition Crouching Aphrodite (2nd century BC, Doidalsas), examples of which are Lely Venus (British Museum). Sculptural versions were popular in the 16th and 17th centuries; pictorial versions are less common, although they were copied by Rubens and Cézanne. Plastov made changes to the pose: he straightened the figure, changed the position of the arms, which gave her pride, and covered part of the body with hair. He combined two models of perspective — for the landscape and for the scene in the anteroom, making the landscape of Prislonikha a key part of the canvas and a metaphor. According to Tatiana Plastova, the artist tried to create an ideal image of the Venus of Heaven without sensuality in the spirit of Titian. The painting is also comparable to Tintoretto's Susanna, where purity and righteousness are expressed through the perfection of nudity. Tatiana Plastova proposed another version in her book Arkady Plastov's Country and World (2018). In it, she argues that the heroines of most of the artist's lyrical paintings — the list of which, quoted by the researcher in the book, includes Spring — reflect a special type of Russian woman, "the plastic prototype of which was the image of Natalia Alekseevna, his wife". In an article in 2020, Tatiana Plastova has already written that in the painting Spring the artist tried to create a "formula of the ideal body". Therefore, the question of the prototype of the protagonist is difficult. If the girl had a prototype in the person of Nina Sharymova, the woman can be recognized as the painter's wife in her youth, and his fellow villager Anna Kondratyeva, who posed for one of the preparatory sketches. In both cases, the similarity of the portraits is reduced.

Possible prototypes of the female figure

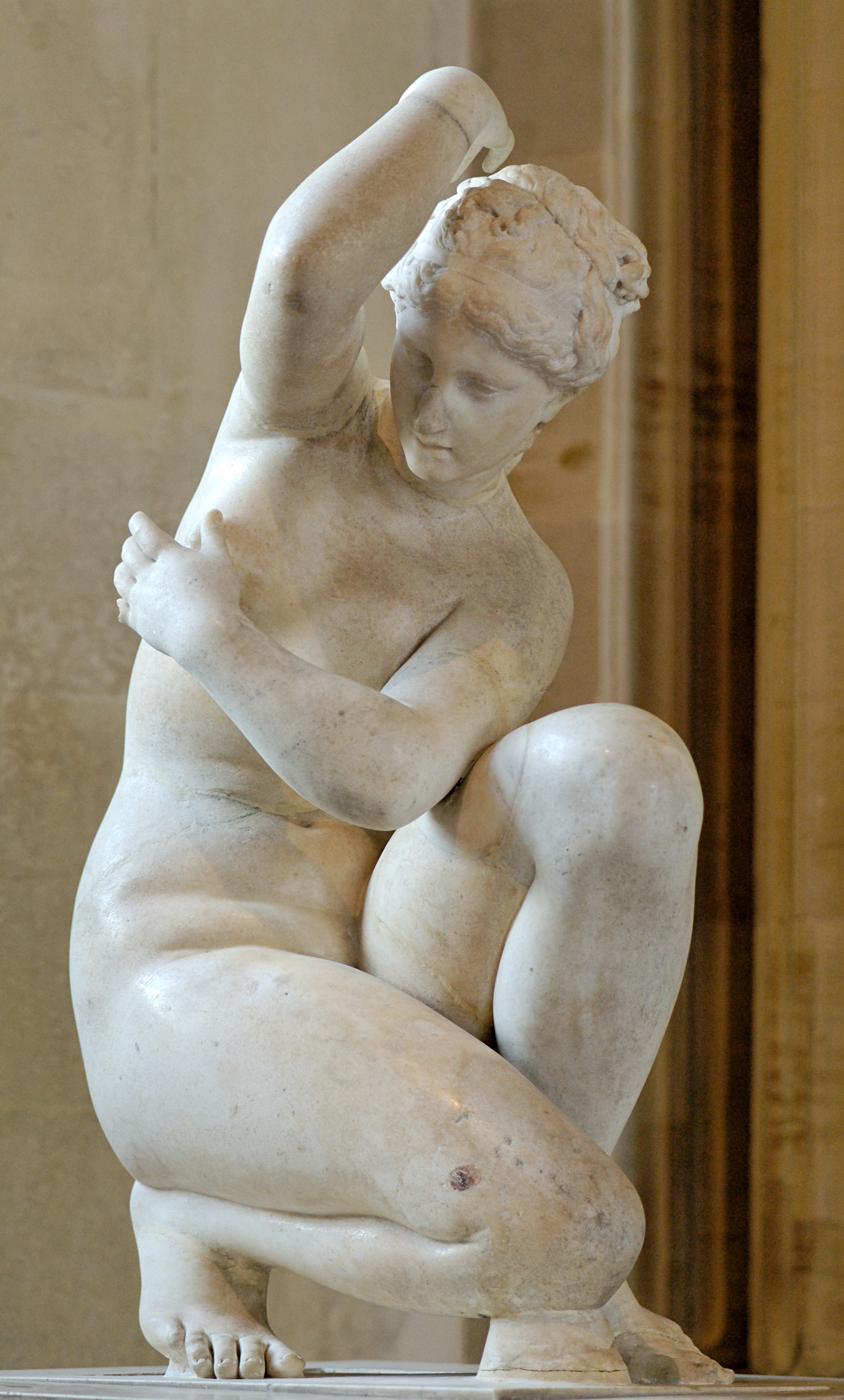
Crouching Aphrodite from the Louvre

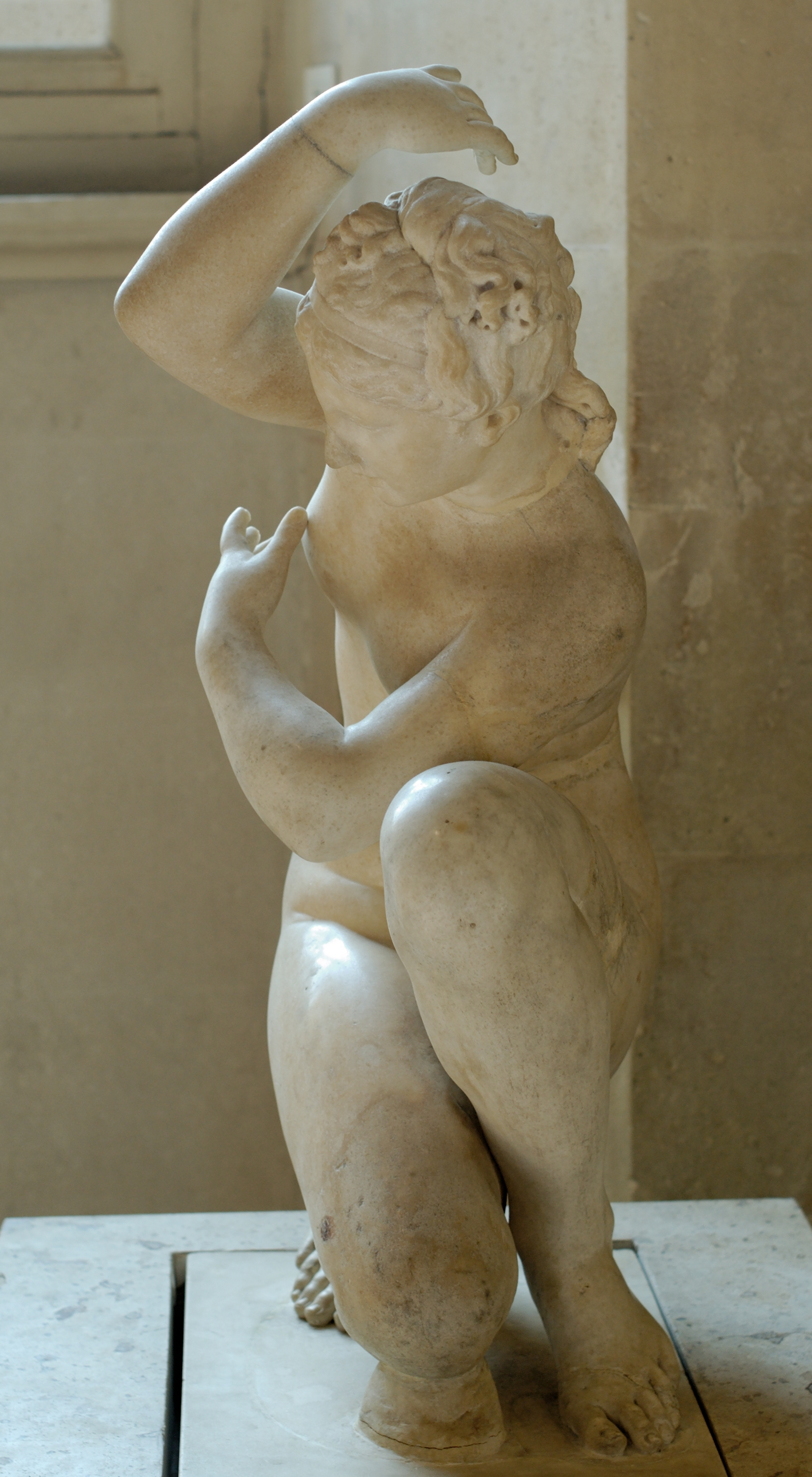
Lely Venus from the British Museum

== Exhibitions ==
The painting Spring was completed in 1954. Its size is 210×123 cm. It is oil painting on canvas. It was first presented to the public at an exhibition at the Academy of Arts of the USSR. The State Tretyakov Gallery acquired the canvas in the 1960s. The inventory number of the painting in the collection of the gallery is ZhS-763. During the Soviet era, the painting was exhibited in many countries of the world. At the beginning of the 21st century the painting was still exhibited. In particular, it was presented at the exhibition in the Marble Palace of the Russian Museum in St. Petersburg on the occasion of the G7 summit in 2006.

Spring was shown at some of the first exhibitions under different names, such as Old Village, In the Old Village, Spring in the Old Village, In the Bathhouse, and Spring, but they are no longer in use. Critics demanded that the painting's title be changed because they said it did not accurately represent the Soviet village of their time. They claimed that the huts in the village were not smoky, and that the walls, floors, and straw were not covered in smoke. As a result, Arkady Plastov began to consider changing the title himself, fearing that the painting would be closed to the viewer. However, he settled on his addition, which is also not used today: Spring. Old Village. Another version was presented by Igor Dolgopolov, an honored artist of the RSFSR. He claimed that the staff of the Tretyakov Gallery gave the painting this name without the artist's knowledge. During his visit to the gallery, Arkady Plastov saw a sign that read Spring.Old Village. He was angry and tore off the second part of the sign, leaving only Spring.

The artist wrote a letter to art critic S. in response to a request to explain the title of the painting. "What can I tell you about why I titled one of my paintings Spring? If you enjoy answering questions from the public. It's hard for me to answer those questions. I'd be interested to know how you answered them. But if you want to ask me this question, it is much worse and sadder, because it means that even the most sensitive hearts are closed to the most ordinary voices of art..."

Irina Yemeliyanova, a student of pedagogy, and Evelina Polishchuk, a student of art history, noted that visitors to the Tretyakov Gallery call the painting Northern Venus. Currently, the painting opens a section of the art of the second half of the 20th century in Hall 28 of the New Tretyakov Gallery's permanent exhibition, a branch of the Tretyakov Gallery.

== Critics and reviews ==
=== In Soviet period ===
The painting Spring caught the attention of art critics and the public. However, it was not accepted without question. It was seen as a departure from the traditions of Soviet domestic art and the author's current life in a Soviet village. It was also seen as a departure from the current state of society, which was living some changes.

Vladimir Kostin noted in his 1956 book that Spring caused controversy and contradictory assessments. Critics said the painting was "unreasonable" because it showed only the effect of the nude body. Defenders of the painting said that, even though the theme of the naked female body was not a main focus in Soviet art, it should be considered based on ethical and aesthetic standards. Kostin believed that the bathhouse theme made the painting okay, and its heroine is a normal woman in a natural pose, charming in her youth, simplicity, and health. He also said that Plastov showed how strong Russian men are: the heroine easily endures the cold while caring for her sister. Boris Ioganson, the director of the Tretyakov Gallery, criticized the painting for showing details that are no longer used, like the smoke bath and the open anteroom. He allowed their appropriateness only as a way to show off the colors — the difference between the whiteness of the body and the whiteness of the landscape. On the other hand, Alexander Kamensky believed that the painting celebrates youth and beauty, and it reflects the spirit of the Khrushchev thaw. He thought the scene was modern because the girl helps her sister dress on a cold day, showing that youth and strength are triumphant.

The film director Sergei Gerasimov believed that the painting Spring was undeservedly negatively evaluated. Objecting to the critics, he said:

The popular character suggests a deep, meaningful idea, and it is full of images of what it represents. It also has a lively, friendly feeling, which is very important. This is because the artist loves his subject and life itself. Plastov loves his characters and understands their nature. What did he see in this woman? Was it just her beautiful naked body? This is the beauty of the work. The true beauty of the work lies in its overall tone, capturing the essence of fresh, young motherhood with a beautiful, rustic, and national diligence...

In the book Among Artists (1986), which was published much later, Vladimir Kostin noted that the painting Spring quickly became very popular and that the canvas immediately took a place in the permanent exhibition of the Tretyakov Gallery. He called the painting bold and unexpected in its theme. From the art historian's point of view, the master was able to express the "chaste purity of the naked female body, with its healthy sensuality, devoid of eroticism", as few artists had succeeded in doing. According to Kostin, the painting evokes in the viewer an associative image of early spring, freshness and health.

Art historian and graphic artist Galina Shubina noted that nudity in Soviet art was interpreted as a "form of dress" of athletes and workers, but in Plastov's painting it is justified only by a reference to the special status of the heroine, who allegorically represents early spring. The poverty of peasant life in the painting (the bathhouse is black, no electricity, minimal amenities) was of secondary importance to the author, but its depiction in the 1950s was also met with disapproval.

The Soviet art historian Ariadna Zhukova considered the painting to be one of the most interesting works of the artist (including the First Snow, Tractor Drivers' Dinner, When Peace is on Earth). All of these paintings show children. Zhukova said that the artist was attracted to youth, freshness, and "the emergence of the new" in these paintings. According to Zhukova, Arkady Plastov depicts nature "not only in his own name, but also in the name of his little heroes, through their direct, pure perception of the world". She believes that the artist sees the world around him like an explorer. This approach results in a "joyful, lyrical tone" in his paintings. Speaking about the painting Spring, Zhukova noted that anyone who has been to a Russian bathhouse knows that a woman does not feel cold in the snow after a hot bath, which is why she is not in a hurry to get out from under the falling snowflakes. According to the art historian, the woman in the painting is "unconsciously happy about being young, healthy, and strong." Zhukova said that Spring is one of the most poetic and pure images of women in Soviet painting.

=== Modern critics and reviews ===
People's Artists of the USSR and full members of the Academy of Arts of the USSR, Sergey and Alexei Tkachev in their article Word about A.A. Plastov (on the 90th anniversary of the artist's birth) called the picture Spring one of the masterpieces of Arkady Plastov. They wrote: "The image of a young mother in this painting is one of the best female images in the world." Tkachevy also wrote that the artist "thinks in colors," and that the colors in his paintings reflect the emotional content of the work. He says that Plastov's success in creativity was due to his love for nature and his ability to work selflessly. Tkachevy said that this allowed Plastov to create a "captivating magic that literally hypnotizes the viewer" in the painting Spring. Tkachevy also quoted Plastov: "Always go to Mother Nature for advice, to the truth of the environment, listen patiently a hundred times to what she, this nature, will reveal and tell you, and you will never get into trouble, and then you will surely convey to the viewer what you want to convey".

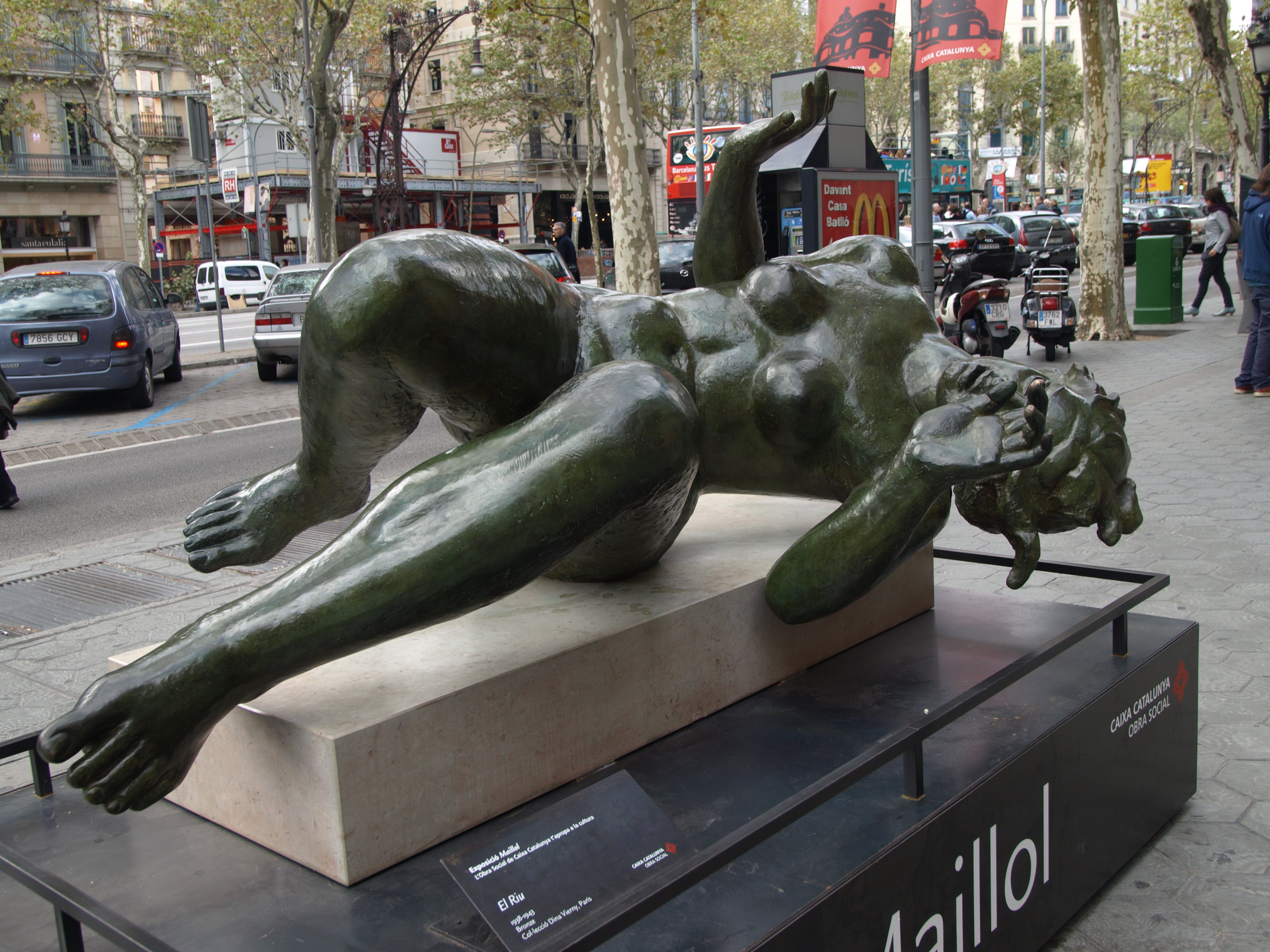
Aristide Maillol. The River, 1938—1943.

The book Russian Artists from A to Z (2010) mentions that the artist was inspired by a strong and healthy village woman who cares for her daughter and forgets the snow and cold because of her motherly feelings. They thought the subject of the painting was not the awakening nature, but the "spring of life" — the naked figure of a woman symbolizing beauty, love, and joy. They thought Plastov's painting was unusual because it was a "nude" (a painting of a person's body) in the "spring" genre, which is a type of painting that usually shows flowers and plants. They also thought it was unusual because it showed the artist going back to the styles of the "old masters" and "eternal" subjects of art, which was a common style during the time when socialist realism was the most popular..

Tatiana Plastova in her book Plastov (2011) expresses that the artist managed to reflect the ideal of physical and spiritual beauty, which is unattainable in real life. The coldly detached, touching image of a child and the simplicity of the plot place the painting on a pedestal of pure joy and chaste love, and the title Spring emphasizes its metaphorical nature. Later, in a 2018 book, Plastova called Spring the embodiment of Titian's Heavenly Love, contrasting it with the earthly beginnings personified by Aristide Maillol's sculptures and Plastov's earlier works, such as Tractor Woman (1943—1944). She attributed the painting's background to the influence of Dmitri Arkhangelsky, noting that it represented an archetype of Russian landscape without contingency. Plastova emphasized the "poetry" of the 1950s, including Spring, and contrasted it with the tragic and triumphant paintings of other periods. The artist used two perspectives, one for the landscape and one for the lower part of the canvas, which avoided naturalistic deformation of the body. Photographic studies helped to choose the optimal horizon and point of view, transforming a domestic subject into a metaphorical work close to the "eventless genre".

Giorgione. Rural Concert, 1509

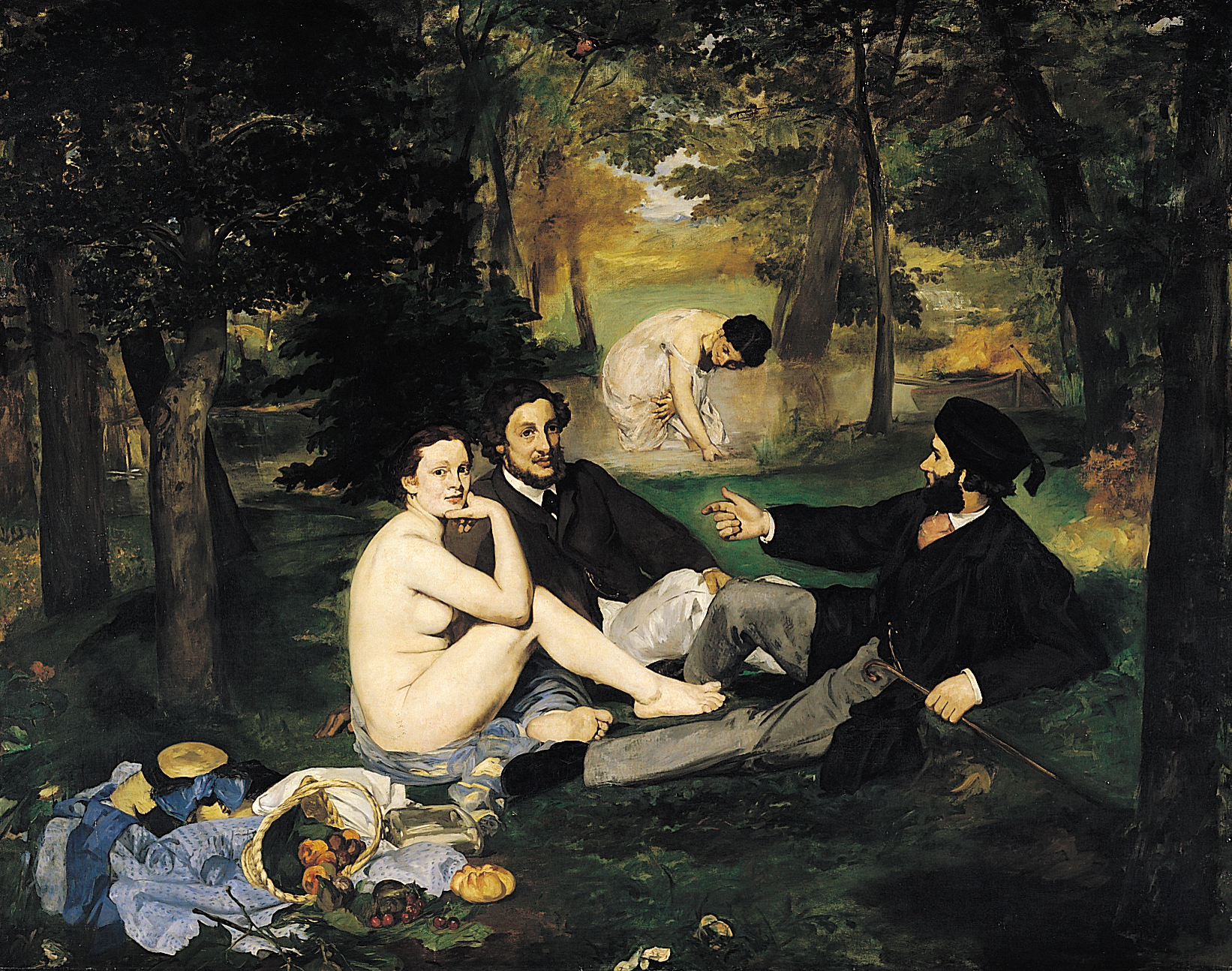
Édouard Manet. Breakfast on the Grass, 1863

Evgenia Yarkova, a researcher at the State Tretyakov Gallery, points out that the everyday life of the heroes is "interrupted" by a golden light. This light highlights the naked body of a woman in the painting. The viewer does not know where the light is coming from. According to the art historian, this detail connects Spring with the myth of Danae, which is well-known in the "nude" genre. In paintings of this scene, light is sometimes shown as rain from coins. Light in Plastov's paintings is not a plot element, as in the paintings depicting Danae (Zeus enters his beloved under the guise of golden rain), but a compositional device. The way light and air interact in the painting makes it seem as if the viewer can touch it. The color of the falling snow changes from dull to bright as it approaches the woman's body. Yarkova sees this as a symbol of spring. The artist contrasts the woman's blonde hair, golden ears, and pink skin with the bathhouse door, the water in the bucket, and the landscape. The steam from the bathhouse and the cold snow create a feeling of warmth and coldness, respectively. The green mitten on the straw stands out in color and creates a sense of rhythm in the painting.

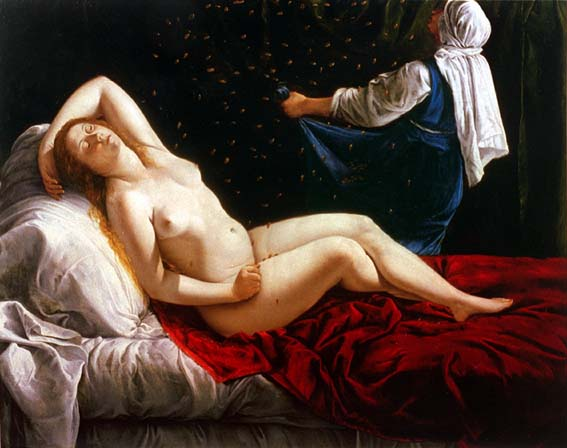
Artemisia Gentileschi. Danae, ca. 1612

Inga Filippova, a student of art history, wrote about the late period of the artist's work in her thesis. She notes that, unlike other works by Plastov, where the characters exist independently of each other and are at the mercy of their own thoughts, in the painting Spring the drama is based on the interaction of the characters — mother and child. In other paintings where characters talk to each other, the artist often did not create realistic characters or choose the right feelings. In Spring, however, "the figurative and semantic line is built on subtle emotional directions, which unite the action into a single whole that cannot be separated. In a genre scene like this, where it's a domestic situation, the artist presents such a wealth of feelings and experiences that is rarely seen in works of this genre".

Filippova believes that among the paintings of the 1950s, the painting Spring is a "special achievement" and "one of the peaks of creativity" of Arkady Plastov. It is exceptional in filling the genre plot with poetic content, within the genre scene the artist created an image possessing "divine beauty". Its composition has more details and action than in the other two paintings of the master of this period: Spring (1952, canvas, oil, 221×121 cm, National Picture Gallery of Armenia) and Youth (another title — Rest, 1954, canvas, oil, 170×204 cm, State Russian Museum, Zh-7012). The artist is fascinated not only by his own feelings in conveying the attitude to the fact he depicts, but also "concentrates" on the experience of his heroine, conveys her maternal care and love.

Doctor of Art Vladimir Lenyashin thought Spring was one of the most poetic paintings of Arkady Plastov. The art expert pointed out the interesting contrast between the winter air, the simple village bath, and the bright light of the heroine's body. He also mentioned the softness of the child's face, which shows the precious sunlight on the straw. Plastov really liked the woman and the child. According to Lenyashin, in this painting the artist explained the morality ("moral folk values") developed over centuries. The researcher fully believed that this painting was a great example of socialist realism, and he thought it was one of the best paintings of this type. Vladimir Lenyashin also said that the artist did a very good job of including a nude person in the snow in a way that was similar to Impressionist paintings. The art historian also said that Plastov did not like the idea of giving his paintings specific names.

== In culture ==
Marina Glazova, member of the International Union of Teaching Artists, and Vladimir Denisov, Director of the Obninsk School of Fine Arts, analyze Arkady Plastov's Spring in the textbook Fine Arts. Algorithm of Composition (2012). They reveal the compositional structure of the painting — four squares correlated with each other, as well as the specificity of the artist's coloristic solution of the plot — "in the painting Spring the white color is dissolved in the form of grace and love, its practice is not noticed, but it is present and penetrates into the chamber space". Stanislav Lomov and Sergey Ignatiev, Doctors of Education, and the teacher Marina Karmazina in their textbook for the general secondary school Art: Fine Arts. Grade 8 (2019) use the painting Spring to illustrate the concept of "static composition". They note that in such a composition, in the process of arranging the main elements, artists use compositional schemes in the form of simple geometric figures. The peculiarity of static compositions is a stable compositional scheme. In particular, in Arkady Plastov's painting Spring it is a rectangle.

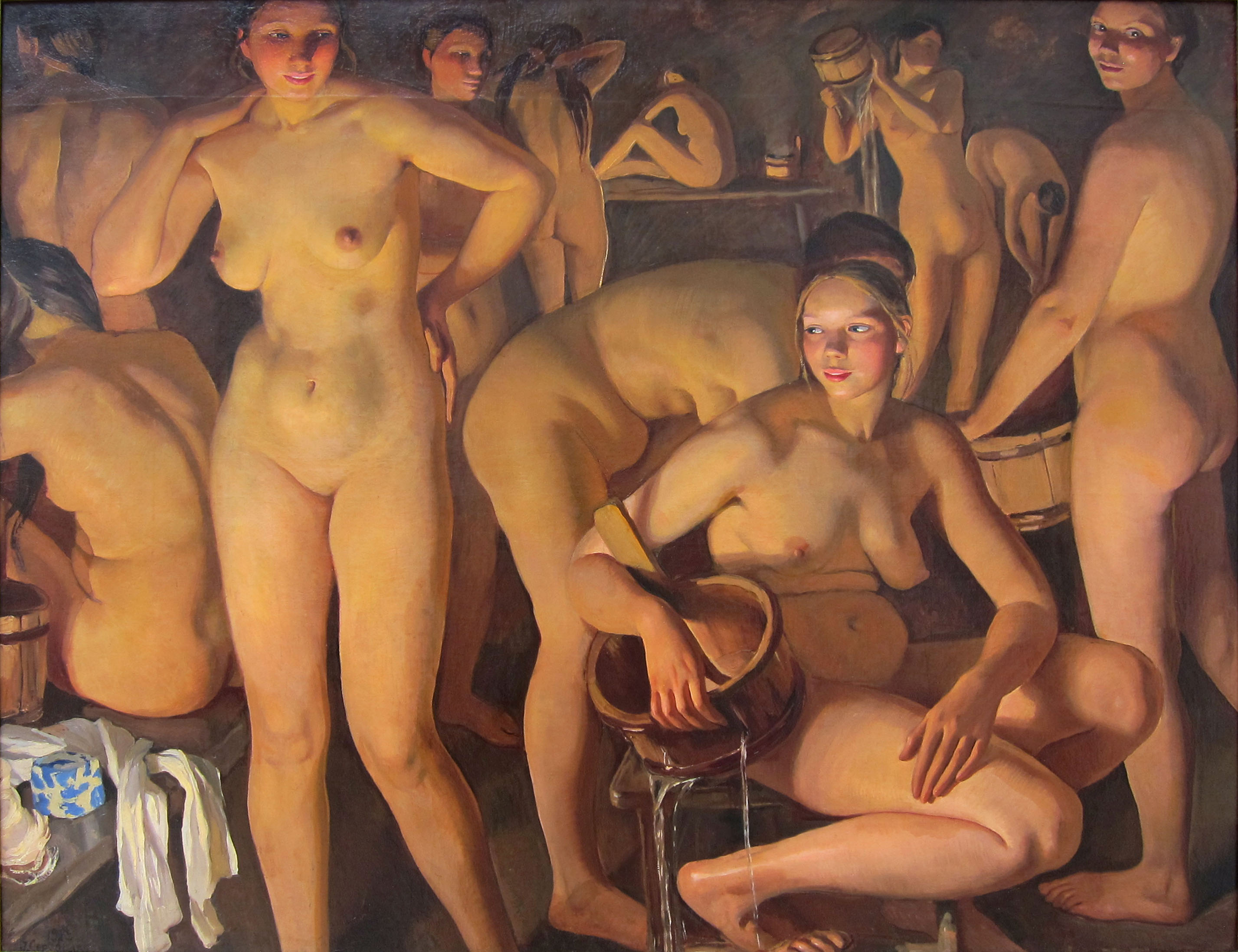
Zinaida Serebryakova, Bath house, 1913

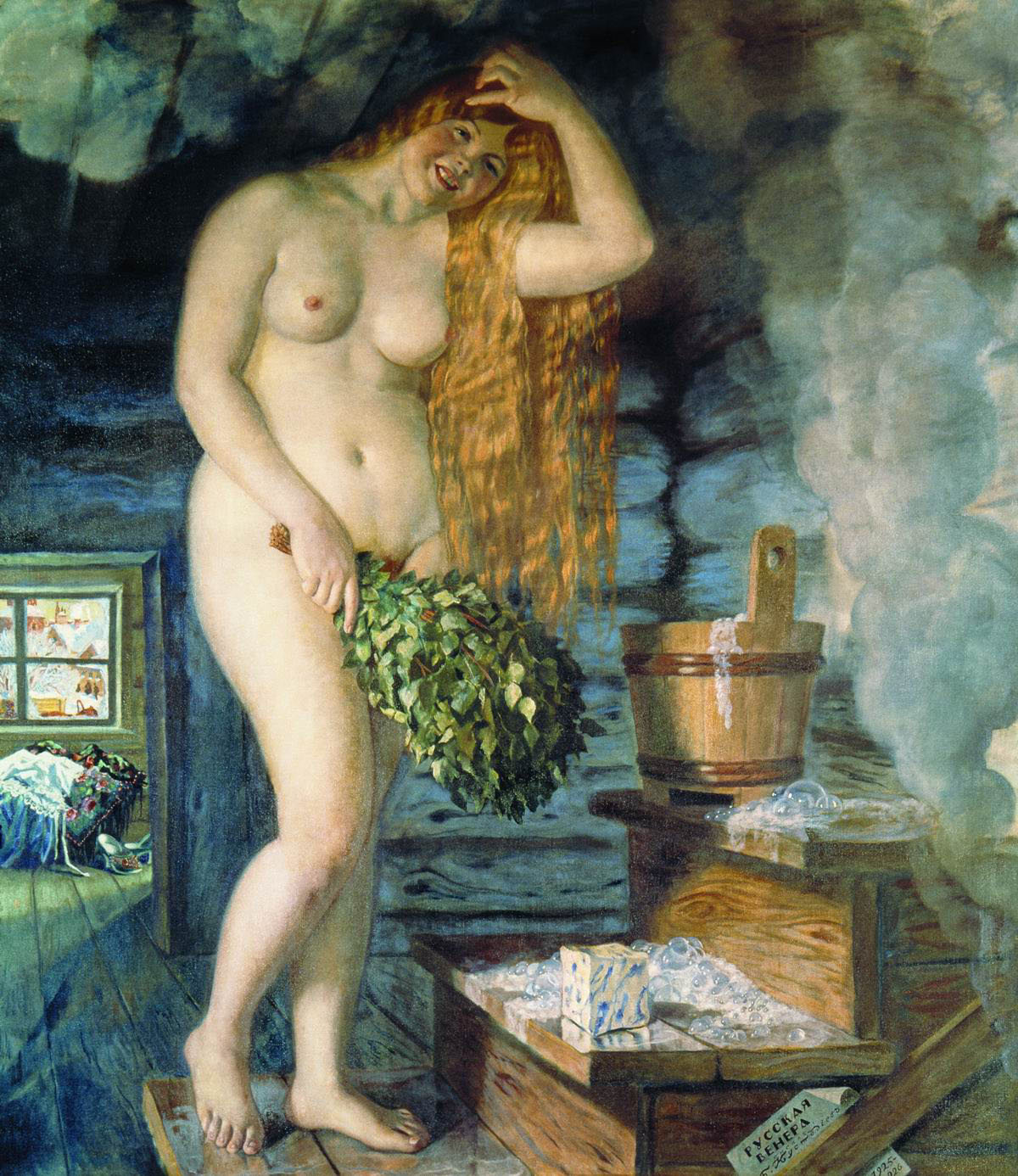
Boris Kustodiev, Russian Venus, 1925—1926

Dr. Isabella Shangina, a historian, wrote a book called Russian Traditional Life: An Encyclopedic Dictionary (2003), shows a picture of the entrance to a Russian bathhouse with a painting of Spring. According to Shangina, the most basic version of a Russian bathhouse is a wooden structure with no roof or door. In this case, as the author says, people actually undressed and dressed outside the bathhouse, and for the time they stayed in it, they left clean and dirty linen right outside.

The Russian-speaking Dutch writer of Jewish origin Marina Paley mentions Arkady Plastov's painting in her novel Tribute to the Salamander: A St. Petersburg Romance (2012). The heroine of the novel compares herself on a bright winter day to the heroine of the painting Spring — "a girl who, with varying degrees of brightness (and regardless of the season), resides in Plastov's splendor". When she leaves the house, she applies makeup "to match the beauty of the surroundings". Soviet and Russian art historian, member of the Union of Artists of Russia, director of the State Literary and Memorial Museum — Reserve of Anton Chekhov Melikhovo Yuri Bychkov in the book of memoirs In life, what does not happen (2013) one of the chapters called Bathing grace. In it he writes about the "value" of his "bathhouse observations" in early childhood, when he went to the bathhouse with his mother on women's days. The art historian confirmed the importance of his impressions later, he says, when he became acquainted with the masterpieces of the classics of the genre: Galina Serebryakova [the author's mistake: it should be Zinaida Serebryakova], Alexander Gerasimov, Arkady Plastov, Boris Kustodiev. Bychkov concluded: "The bath subjects eloquently say: this is beauty absolute, unconditional, perfect, complete". In the first edition of 2013, this text is accompanied by a reproduction of the painting Spring.

Writer and producer Alexandra Piskunova talked about her impressions of the picture:

...I came into the hall and, not yet fully aware of what was in front of me, hurried to the canvas. It was hanging by the windows. The gray winter light from the street fell on the painting, showing the pink body of a naked young woman crouching in a roofless entryway to dress her washed daughter. It was snowing above her, and the time of day in the painting was the same as it was outside: before dusk. All of a sudden, I understood that life and art were connected, and I felt wonderfully light and bright.

== Bibliography ==
- Avdonin-Biryuchyovsky, А. М. (2006). Аркадий Александрович Пластов [Arkady Aleksandrovich Plastov] (in Russian). Ульяновск: Корпорация технологий продвижения. p. 55.
- Allenova Е. М.; Volodina Т. I.; Krasilin М. М.; Borisovskaya N. А.; Gordon Е. S. (2000). Аркадий Александрович Пластов // Русские художники от «А» до «Я» [Arkady Aleksandrovich Plastov // Russian artists from “A” to “Z"] (in Russian). М.: Слово. p. 216. ISBN 5-8505-0231-9.
- Dedyukhin, V. А. (1970). Снежинки // Краски Прислонихи (О художнике А. Пластове) [Snowflakes // Colors of Prislonikha (About artist A. Plastov)] (in Russian). Саратов: Приволжское книжное издательство. p. 104.
- Dolgopolov, I. V. (1988). Аркадий Пластов // Мастера и шедевры [Arkady Plastov // Masters and Masterpieces] (in Russian). Vol. III. М.: Изобразительное искусство. pp. 283–314.
- Yemeliyanova, I. D. (1971). Аркадий Пластов [Arkady Plastov] (in Russian). М.: Изобразительное искусство. p. 56.
- Zhukova, А. S. (1969). Под русским солнцем // С веком наравне. Рассказы о картинах [Under the Russian sun // With the century on a par. Stories about paintings] (in Russian). Vol. 2. М.: Молодая гвардия. pp. 431–437.
- Ioganson, B. V. (1955). Всесоюзная художественная выставка 1954 года: всенародный смотр [The All-Union Art Exhibition of 1954: a nationwide review] (in Russian). Искусство: Журнал. pp. 6–10. ISSN 0130-2523.
- Kamensky, А. А. (1955). Тема и образ: (Заметки с выставки) [Theme and Image: (Notes from the exhibition)] (in Russian). Искусство: Журнал. pp. 11–19. ISSN 0130-2523.
- Kozlov Yu. V., Avdonin А. М. (2013). Жизнь и судьба Аркадия Пластова [Life and Fate of Arkady Plastov] (in Russian). Ульяновск: Корпорация технологий продвижения. ISBN 978-5-946-55237-0.
- Kostin, V. I. (1956). Аркадий Александрович Пластов [Arkady Aleksandrovich Plastov] (in Russian). М.: Советский художник.
- Kostin, V. I. (1986). Деревня Аркадия Пластова // Среди художников [Arkady Plastov's Village // Among Artists] (in Russian). М.: Советский художник. pp. 38–41.
- Lenyashin, V. A. (2018). «Словарный запас» пластовской эпопеи // Пластова Т. Ю. Аркадий Пластов. «От этюда к картине». Статьи, воспоминания, материалы [“Vocabulary” of Plastov's epic // Plastova T. Yu. Arkady Plastov. “From sketch to painting”. Articles, memoirs, materials] (in Russian). М.: Фонд «Связь эпох». pp. 6–17.
- Leontyeva, G. K. (1965). Аркадий Александрович Пластов [Arkady Aleksandrovich Plastov]. Народная библиотечка по искусству (in Russian). Л.: Художник РСФСР.
- Очерки истории водоснабжения и водоотведения (теоретический, практический и социокультурный аспекты) [Essays on the history of water supply and sanitation (theoretical, practical and socio-cultural aspects)] (in Russian). Томск: Томский государственный архитектурно-строительный университет. 2014. p. 164. ISBN 978-5-9305-7580-4.
- Plastova, T. Yu. (2011). Весна и лето // Пластов [Spring and summer // Plastov]. Великие художники (in Russian). М.: Директ-Медиа, Комсомольская правда. p. 48. ISBN 978-5-7475-0082-2.
- Plastova, T. Yu. (2018). Страна и мир Аркадия Пластова // Пластова Т. Ю. Аркадий Пластов. «От этюда к картине». Статьи, воспоминания, материалы [Country and the World of Arkady Plastov // Plastova T.Y. Arkady Plastov. “From sketch to painting”. Articles, memoirs, materials] (in Russian). М.: Фонд «Связь эпох». pp. 18–187.
- Plastova, T. Yu. (2020). "Картина А. А. Пластова «Весна». К истории создания" [Painting by A. A. Plastov's painting “Spring”. To the history of creation]. Secreta Artis (in Russian) (1 (09)). Secreta Artis: Журнал.: 3–30.
- Sitnina, М. К. (1966). Времена года: русская пейзажная живопись [Seasons: Russian landscape painting] (in Russian). М.: Искусство. p. 35.
- Sysoyev, V. P. (2001). Аркадий Пластов [Arkady Plastov] (in Russian). М.: Белый город.
- Filippova, I. I. (2014). Дети и детство в живописи А. А. Пластова [Children and childhood in the painting of A. A. Plastov. A. Plastov] (in Russian). Русский мир: Журнал.
- Tkachyov A. P., Tkachyov S. P. (1999). Слово о А. А. Пластове (к 90-летию художника) // Наши раздумья [A word about A. A. Plastov (to the 90th anniversary of the artist) // Our thoughts]. Научное издание (in Russian). М.: Редакционно-издательский отдел НИИ Российской академии художеств. pp. 23–31.
- Filippova, I. I. (2018). Живопись Аркадия Пластова 1930—1960-х годов. Творческий метод и образно-смысловые структуры. Диссертация на соискание учёной степени кандидата искусствоведения [Arkady Plastov's painting of the 1930-1960s. Creative method and figurative and semantic structures. Dissertation for the degree of Candidate of Art History] (PDF) (in Russian). СПб.: Санкт-Петербургский государственный академический институт живописи, скульптуры и архитектуры имени И. Е. Репина при Российской академии художеств. p. 182. Archived from the original (PDF) on 31 October 2018.
- Shubina, G. (2014). Аркадий Пластов (1893—1972) [Arkady Plastov (1893—1972)] (in Russian). М.: Paulsen. pp. 166–167. ISBN 978-5-98797-080-5.

=== Textbooks ===
- Glazova M. V., Denisov V. S. (2012). Законы композиции // Изобразительное искусство. Алгоритм композиции [Composition laws // Fine Arts. Algorithm of composition] (in Russian). М.: Когито-центр. pp. 38–43. ISBN 978-5-8935-3362-0.
- Lomov S. P., Ignatiev S. E., Karamazina M. V. (2019). Статичные композиции // Искусство: Изобразительное искусство. 8 класс [Static compositions // Art: Fine Arts. Grade 8]. Российский учебник (in Russian). М.: Дрофа. pp. 86–94. ISBN 978-5-3582-1758-4.

Fiction and memories

- Bychkov, Yu. A. (2013). Банная благодать // В жизни чего только не бывает [Bathing grace // There are many things in life] (in Russian). М.: Пробел-2000. pp. 83–91. ISBN 978-5-9860-4372-2.
- Dyomochkin, G. A. (2018). "Весна Пластова в рассказах его невестки, художницы Елены Холодилиной" [Plastov's Spring in the stories of his daughter-in-law, artist Elena Kholodilina]. AiF (in Russian) (28 February (№ 9)). Аргументы и факты: Газета. Archived from the original on 27 February 2021.
- Paley, M. А. (2012). "21. Commedia dell'Arte". Дань саламандре: петербургский роман [A Tribute to the Salamander: A St. Petersburg Novel]. Принцесса стиля (in Russian). М.: Эксмо. pp. 79–83.

Handbooks and encyclopedias

- Shanguina, I. I. (2003). Баня // Русский традиционный быт: Энциклопедический словарь [Bath // Russian traditional life: Encyclopedic dictionary] (in Russian). СПб.: Азбука-классика. pp. 27–35. ISBN 5-352-00337-X.
