= The First Snow (painting) =

Painting by Arkady Plastov

First snow
- Artist: Arkady Plastov
- Year: 1946
- Medium: Oil on canvas
- Dimensions: 146 cm × 113 cm (57 in × 44 in)
- Location: Tver Regional Art Gallery, Tver

The First Snow is a painting by Russian Soviet artist Arkady Plastov. It was created in 1946 in the village of Prislonikha, Karsunsky District, Ulyanovsk Region. The canvas is part of the permanent exhibition and collection of the Tver Regional Art Gallery.

It has been studied by Soviet and contemporary Russian researchers of Arkady Plastov's work. Some of them are: the candidate of art history Lev Mochalov, the candidate of art history Galina Leontieva, the candidate of philological sciences Tatiana Plastova, and others. From the perspective of Inga Filippova, candidate of art history, the First Snow is one of Plastov's most poetic works, synthesizing the fragile balance of landscape and genre painting.

Arkady Plastov's canvas has been repeatedly recommended by Soviet and modern Russian teachers and methodologists for use in lessons and extracurricular activities in primary and secondary schools.

== Description ==
The painting depicts a boy and a girl who went outside to watch the first snow. The artist conveys the sense of a winter day, the charm of village children, their interest in the world around them, and their admiration for its beauty. Soviet and Russian art historians have noted the author's interest in Russian nature and sensibility with children.

The painting depicts the porch of a village house, a white birch tree in the front garden "with a naked silver crown", and a deserted village street "in the whiteness of falling flakes of snow". Soviet and Russian art popularizer Alexander Berezin wrote that the landscape has a lyrical character: "the artist subtly and penetratingly conveys the feeling of a fresh winter day, when dazzling fluffy snowflakes rush through the air".

The children went out on the porch to look at the first snow. The children are wearing valenki that are likely taken from their elders, and the shawl on the girl's head seems that belongs to someone else because of its size. The artist's biographer, Vasily Dedyukhin, in his book Colors of Prislonikha, dedicated to the artist, notes the special significance of the ordinary details in the painting: the porch has only two steps, the log wall has no windows. Dedyukhin wrote that it creates the impression of the small size of the house; perhaps it has only one room, a crow sits on a birch tree, another squats on the snow in the front garden, and nearby is a large dark spot (a muddy puddle that has not yet been covered by the first snow). In the background, a moving sled can be seen, which is being driven by a peasant standing on it. Describing the plot of the painting the First Snow, he emphasized the momentary nature of the event that the artist captured.

"A girl of about eight or nine years old ran out with her little brother to the porch. He is dressed for winter... And she jumped out for a minute, stuck her bare feet into her big felt boots, and threw a white shawl over her head, which she supports with both hands. And her face is turned up, mesmerized, admiring the snowflakes, which, perhaps, fell all night and are still falling... Happy moments are given to each person; they are sometimes brief, fleeting. By depicting them on the canvas, the artist accomplishes a holy deed".

Galina Leontieva also notes that the girl put on a "light calico dress" with only a scarf, while the boy, just in case, dressed completely for winter: in a coat, felt boots, and ushanka.

== History of the painting ==
Arkady Plastov created the painting the First Snow in 1946. The painting is executed in oil on canvas and measures 146 × 113 cm. It is part of the collection and is on permanent display at the Tver Regional Art Gallery, with the inventory number Zh-1304.

By the time he began work on the canvas, Arkady Plastov had already been a successful artist: in 1945, he was awarded the title "Honored Artist of the RSFSR". In 1946, he received the State Stalin Prize of the first degree for his paintings Harvest and Haymaking, both of which were acquired for the collection of the State Tretyakov Gallery.

The theme of childhood was one of the leading subjects in Arkady Plastov's work. In his paintings, children participate in events, and each child is depicted with a unique personality.

The hut with a porch depicted in the painting can no longer be found, and the fates of the village boy and girl who posed for the artist remain unknown. Elena Nikolaevna, the wife of Plastov's son, considered the children in the painting the First Snow to be composite images. Valentina Volkova and Ivan Repin, who posed as children for Plastov, shared this view. Volkova noted, "I am completely portrayed only in the portrait Valya Volkova. Otherwise, he painted me in parts: hands, hair, eyes — and then inserted them into other paintings".

Evgeny Kibrick, an illustrator and painter, witnessed Arkady Plastov's work on the painting the First Snow. He described his impressions in the book The Work and Thoughts of the Artist, which was published posthumously in 1984:

The first snow is falling in big, soft flakes —white, pure, and festive. I enter Arkady Alexandrovich’s studio, where he is working on a painting titled the First Snow. He paints quickly and freshly: the scene includes the porch of a village house, a tree covered in mossy snow, children, and a dog— thick, colorful, and vibrant spots on the cold, white snow. The painting is beautiful, festive, and surprisingly true to life; Plastov's vision always captures the beauty of life. He frequently steps out into the street for new impressions, despite his studio being on the second floor.

The artist first presented the First Snow to an audience in 1936. Its current location is unknown, but it was published along with a sketch in the magazine Iskusstvo in 1937. The foreground of the canvas depicted numerous tracks from carts and horses, and according to art historian Vladimir Kostin, the tone of the greenery was intrusive and more suited to spring than fall. He also criticized the depiction of the background, describing it as a monotonous and shapeless forest. Kostin deemed the artist's use of colors and composition to be haphazard. In contrast, contemporary art historian Tatiana Plastova, who only had access to a black-and-white magazine reproduction, found the composition original and argued that the artist did not err in his use of color.

In 1947, at the exhibition of Soviet paintings and drawings in Vienna at the Museum of Applied Arts featured works of Plastov including the First Snow. Following their exhibition in Vienna, the paintings travelled to Prague, Sofia, and Belgrade. In 1956, six paintings by Arkady Plastov were exhibited at the XXVIII Biennale in Venice, including the First Snow.

== Art criticism ==
=== Soviet art historians ===
Soviet art historian and painter, member of the Union of Artists of the USSR, Vladimir Kostin, in a book dedicated to Plastov and published in 1956, noted the lyricism of the images and the expressiveness of the color in the painting. In his opinion, the artist wanted to convey on his canvas the feelings of freshness and novelty on the day of the first snowfall after the gray and dirty days of autumn, when the earth is covered with pure snow and there is silence. The girl's gaze, on her face "thrown back" towards the falling snow, is "full of quiet joy and naive surprise". In it, the viewer, according to the art historian, easily reads the experiences that he himself had in his childhood years, waiting for winter, and with it — skating on skids, sled, the festive Christmas tree, and cozy evenings in heated dwellings. In his other book, Among Artists (1986), Vladimir Kostin called the canvas the First Snow true and poetic. He wrote that the painting evokes a feeling of joy, purity, and renewal.

Soviet art historian Marina Sitnina described this painting as charming, delicate, and lyrical works. She believed that the artist managed to convey the freshness of a winter day and the silence when snowflakes fall softly and easily. From her point of view, this could only be achieved by an artist who lives permanently in nature. The children in the painting are charming, lively, and observant. The artist captured their hidden joy and naive surprise.

Vasily Dedyukhin wrote that the artist managed to brilliantly convey the happiness of the village children depicted in the picture, for which so little is needed: "weightless snowflakes", the end of dreary, dirty autumn, "anticipation of great children's winter joys," "snowy whiteness", and fresh air.

=== Modern Russian critics ===
People's Artists of the USSR, full members of the Academy of Arts of the USSR Sergei and Alexei Tkachev, called the painting the First Snow one of the pearls of the artist in the article Word about A. A. Plastov (on the 90th anniversary of the artist). The highest praise in this article was deserved by the canvas for how it "happily combined touching figures of children, with discreet, but to the pain in the heart, heartfelt Russian landscape". According to Evgeny Rezepov, the charm of the painting the First Snow, in addition to the extraordinary skill of Plastov as a painter, consists in the artist's subtle and deep understanding of Russian nature and the Russian soul.

From the point of view of Inga Filippova, Candidate of Art History and Head of the Department of Information and Analytical Work of the Russian Museum's Advisory and Methodological Center, the First Snow is one of Plastov's most poetic works, where "a very fine unifying line has been found in the synthesis of landscape and genre painting. Thanks to this fragile balance of the two genres, the artist achieved their absolute subordination to each other. Domestic genre and landscape are in close connection with the overall concept of the painting, which is the semantic center of the canvas." At the same time, the art historian believes that the landscape is interesting to Plastov "insofar as it is consonant with the child's rapturous state." The painting the First Snow is characteristic of Plastov's first postwar works. In it, peacefulness and "a special, mesmerizing silence" are manifested. According to Filippova, the artist enjoys the opportunity to listen "to nature frozen in anticipation of magic or to that which is underlyingly maturing in his own soul and so in tune with what is happening around him".

Filippova noted that the color scheme of the painting is unusually laconic for Plastov's work in general:

"It is based on the juxtaposition of dark and light spots within the gray-blue, white, and black, in combination with ochre. The plasticity of the line—the characteristic bends of birch branches, the emphasized strictness of the log cabin wall's drawing, the piket fence at the porch—plays a major role here. The pictorial expressiveness of the canvas is convincing in Plastov's manner. The artist managed to convey the feeling of dampness in the air, the friability of warm snow thickly lying on the wet ground. The figures of children standing on the porch are the emotional center of the painting, the focus of the artist's understanding of the child's soul".

Marina Udaltsova, an art historian and researcher at the Tsaritsyno Museum, notes "Levitan's mood" in the painting, describing "the achromatic range of colors, silence, serenity, and harmony reigning in the world". Doctor of Art History Vladimir Lenyashin observed that the painting the First Snow conveys "the unclouded joy of communicating with nature".

Tatyana Plastova, Candidate of Philological Sciences and Head of the Department of Humanities at the Moscow Surikov State Academic Institute of Fine Arts, attributed the First Snow to the paintings by the artist (Spring, Noon, Youth, etc.) created in the 1950s and 1960s, in which he moved away from purely genre painting into the realm of plastic metaphor, subordinating his poetics to the pursuit of greater expressiveness. For the researcher, the First Snow is evidence of the artist's rethinking of his "impressionistic language." In reference to this painting, Tatyana Plastova quoted a fragment from a book by Doctor of Art History Michael German: "The Impressionists painted not the objects themselves, not space, but that luminous 'cover,' that intangible substance, which in fact most of all interested them".

== Use in lower grade school teaching ==
Arkady Plastov's canvas has been repeatedly recommended by Soviet and contemporary Russian educators and methodologists for use in primary and secondary school lessons. In particular, Tatyana Gubernskaya, Candidate of Philological Sciences and associate professor of the Russian Language Department at the Russian State Pedagogical University named after A. I. Herzen, in the methodological manual Learning to Write Essays and Compositions (2011), considered it appropriate to use the painting to work on essays in the 4th grade. Methodologist-philologist Natalia Bezdenezhnykh, in the manual Statements, Essays, Mini-Essays for Elementary School (2013), suggests an essay on this painting for 3rd grade students. The authors of the teachers' manual Russian Language. 4th Grade. Training Developments for the Teaching Materials of V. P. Kanakina, V. P. Kanakina, V. G. Goretsky "School of Russia", Tatyana Sitnikova and Irina Yatsenko, describe in detail the methods for teachers to prepare students for writing an essay on a painting. Doctor of Pedagogical Sciences Galina Bakulina has compiled an example of a lesson outline for working on an essay about the painting the First Snow in the 4th grade.

In November 2020, the Orenburg Regional Polyethnic Children's Library prepared a short video dedicated to Arkady Plastov's painting the First Snow as part of the YouTube series The History of One Masterpiece.

Oral work on Arkady Plastov's painting, based on questions formulated in the manual, is intended for use in primary school lessons in the book Literary Reading. Grade 2. Textbook by Ella Katz. In the textbook Art. Fine Art for grade 8 (2015), authored by Doctor of Pedagogical Sciences Stanislav Lomov, Doctor of Art History Sergey Ignatiev, and teacher Marina Karmazina, and aligned with the Federal State Educational Standards, recommended by the Ministry of Education and Science of the Russian Federation, and included in the Federal List of textbooks for secondary general education schools, the canvas First Snow is used to illustrate the artist's ability to convey strong emotional states in static paintings.

== Bibliography ==
=== Sources ===
- Кибрик, Е. А. (1984). Мои друзья-художники // Работа и мысли художника (in Russian). М.: Искусство. pp. 124–132.

=== Researches and fiction sources ===
- Авдонин-Бирючёвский, А. М. (2006). Аркадий Александрович Пластов (in Russian). Ульяновск: Корпорация технологий продвижения. p. 55.
- Березин, А. Д. (1994). Пластов Аркадий Александрович // Художники России: 50 биографий (in Russian). б/м: ЦВС. p. 303.
- Дедюхин, В. А. (1970). Снежинки // Краски Прислонихи (О художнике А. Пластове) (in Russian). Саратов: Приволжское книжное издательство. p. 104.
- Емельянова, И. Д. (1971). Аркадий Пластов (in Russian). М.: Изобразительное искусство. p. 56.
- Жукова, А. С. (1969). Под русским солнцем // С веком наравне. Рассказы о картинах. Сост. В. И. Порудоминский (in Russian). Vol. 2. М.: Молодая гвардия. pp. 431–437.
- Козлов Ю. В., Авдонин А. М. (2013). Жизнь и судьба Аркадия Пластова (in Russian). Ульяновск: Корпорация технологий продвижения. ISBN 978-5-946-55237-0.
- Костин, В. И. (1956). Аркадий Александрович Пластов (in Russian). М.: Советский художник.
- Костин, В. И. (1986). Деревня Аркадия Пластова // Среди художников (in Russian). М.: Советский художник. pp. 38–41.
- Леняшин, В. А. (2018). "Словарный запас пластовской эпопеи". Пластова Т. Ю. Аркадий Пластов. «От этюда к картине». Статьи, воспоминания, материалы (in Russian). М.: Фонд «Связь эпох». pp. 6–17.
- Леонтьева, Г. К. (1965). Аркадий Александрович Пластов. Народная библиотечка по искусству (in Russian). Л.: Художник РСФСР.
- Морозова, Н. С. (2013). Первый снег в русской поэтической модели мира (in Russian). Гуманитарный вектор. Серия: Филология, востоковедение: Журнал. pp. 96–101.
- Морозова, Н. С. (2010). Эстетическое освоение концептуального признака снега «падать» в русской поэзии XVIII—XX вв (in Russian). Vol. V. 1. Филология. Вестник Ленинградского государственного университета имени А. С. Пушкина: Журнал. pp. 1–7.
- Мочалов, Л. В. (1966). Прикосновение к земле // Неповторимость таланта (in Russian). Л.—М.: Искусство. pp. 127–132.
- Мочалов, Л. В. (1963). Художник, картина, зритель. Беседы о живописи (in Russian). Л.: Художник РСФСР.
- Пластова, Т. Ю. (2011). Пластов. Великие художники (in Russian). М.: Директ-Медиа, Комсомольская правда. p. 48. ISBN 978-5-7475-0082-2.
- Пластова, Т. Ю. (2018). Страна и мир Аркадия Пластова // Пластова Т. Ю. Аркадий Пластов. «От этюда к картине». Статьи, воспоминания, материалы (in Russian). М.: Фонд «Связь эпох». pp. 18–187.
- Рапопорт, Л. (1979). Очерк Л. Рапопорта о выставках картин художника А. А. Пластова за рубежом // Достояние культуры — народу. Культурное строительство в Ульяновской области 1917—1975 гг. Документы и материалы (in Russian). Саратов: приволжское книжное издательство. Ульяновское отделение. pp. 125–126.
- Ситнина, М. К. (1966). Времена года: русская пейзажная живопись (in Russian). М.: Искусство. p. 35.
- Сысоев, В. П. (2001). Аркадий Пластов (in Russian). М.: Белый город.
- Ткачёв А. П., Ткачёв С. П. (1999). Слово о А. А. Пластове (к 90-летию художника) // Наши раздумья. Научное издание (in Russian). М.: Редакционно-издательский отдел НИИ Российской академии художеств. pp. 23–31.
- Филиппова, И. И. (2014). Дети и детство в живописи А. А. Пластова // Вестник Южно-Уральского государственного университета. Vol. 14. Серия: Социально-гуманитарные науки: Журнал.
- Филиппова, И. И. (2018). Живопись Аркадия Пластова 1930—1960-х годов. Творческий метод и образно-смысловые структуры. Диссертация на соискание ученой степени кандидата искусствоведения (in Russian). СПб.: Санкт-Петербургский государственный академический институт живописи, скульптуры и архитектуры имени И. Е. Репина при Российской академии художеств. p. 182.

=== Media and journalism ===
- Резепов, Е. Е. (2008). Первый снег. Русский мир: Журнал. Archived from the original on 2018-10-28.

=== Catalogs ===
- Plastow, Arkadij (1947). Ausstellung sowjetischer Malerei (in German). Wien: Druck Globus II. pp. 65–66.

=== Textbooks and manuals for teachers ===
- Бакулина, Г. (2021). "Урок 7. Сочинение по картине А. А. Пластова 'Первый снег'". Обучение сочинению в начальной школе. 4 класс. Методическое пособие с примерными конспектами уроков (in Russian). М.: Издательский центр «ВЛАДОС». pp. 51–57. ISBN 978-5-9074-8212-8.
- Безденежных, Н. В. (2013). Изложения, сочинения, мини-эссе для начальной школы. Здравствуй, школа! (in Russian). Ростов-на-Дону: Феникс. p. 285. ISBN 978-5-2222-1573-9.
- Губернская, Т. В. (2011). Учимся писать изложения и сочинения. 4 класс. Светлячок (in Russian). М.: Эксмо. pp. 18–20. ISBN 978-5-699-52732-8.
- Кац, Э. Э. (2022). "Картина А. А. Пластова 'Первый снег'". Литературноге чтение. 2 класс. Учебное пособие. В 2-х частях. Планета знаний (in Russian). Vol. 1. М.: Дрофа, Астрель. pp. 124–125. ISBN 978-5-0908-0893-4.
- Ломов С. П.; Кармазина М. В.; Игнатьев С. Е. (2015). Искусство. Изобразительное искусство. 8 класс (in Russian). М.: Дрофа. p. 128. ISBN 978-5-3581-4650-1.
- Ситникова Т. Н., Яценко И. Ф. (2021). "Сочинение по картине А. А. Пластова 'Первый снег'". Русский язык. 4 класс. Поурочные разработки к УМК В. П. Канакиной, В. Г. Горецкого «Школа России». Изд. 8-е. В помощь школьному учителю (in Russian). М.: Вако. pp. 169–173. ISBN 978-5-4080-5553-1.
