= Arkady Plastov =

Russian Soviet painter

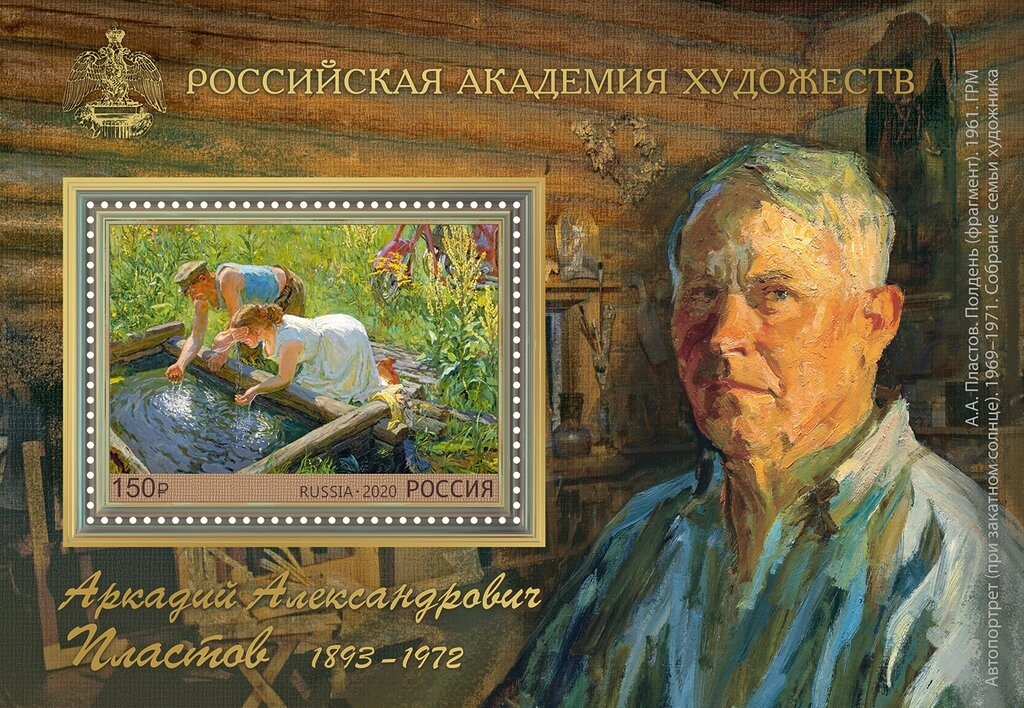
- A 2020 stamp sheet of Russia featuring a self-portrait of Plastov (1969–1971) and his painting Midday (1961).
- Born: Arkady Alexandrovich Plastov; 31 January [O.S. 19 January] 1893; Prislonikha, Simbirsk, Russian Empire
- Died: 12 May 1972 (aged 79); Prislonikha, Ulyanovsk, Soviet Union
- Education: State Free Art Workshops; Moscow School of Painting, Sculpture and Architecture
- Known for: Painting
- Movement: Socialist realism, realism, still life

Arkady Alexandrovich Plastov (Russian: Аркадий Александрович Пластов; 31 January [O.S. 19 January] 1893 – 12 May 1972) was a Russian Soviet painter.

== Biography ==
Spring, 1954. State Tretyakov Gallery, Moscow. Oil on canvas, 210×123 cm.

Plastov was born into a family of icon painters in the village Prislonikha in the Russian Governorate of Simbirsk. He attended the sculpture department of the Moscow School of Painting, Sculpture and Architecture beginning in 1914. In 1917, he returned to his native village, where he occupied himself with painting, drawing from nature.

Starting in 1935, he steps introduces his category painting into the public. According to the strict political-artistic doctrine of the time at that time, which only permits the style of socialist realism in all art kinds, Plastov pictures the life in the Soviet Union, the pervasive building up of socialism. His work is characterized by his knowledge of the life in the villages of the Soviet Union, his love for his native land, strong, live pictures and his skills of painting. As the reaction to the events, which moved the population of the Soviet Union at that time, Plastov showed in his pictures, how the village life had changed by the collectivization. As models of the Protagonists of his works Plastov chose characters of his homeland village. The outbreak of World War II inspired new motives for the work of Plastov. He depictured suffering of the Soviet people, work of the women, old people and children on the kolkhoz fields during the war. After the war Plastov kept the motives of the village life.

A characteristic for Plastov's works is the 1951 painting Spring (Весна). It shows a young naked woman dressing up a girl in front of a wood hut (a banya, the Russian counterpart to the Finnish sauna). It snows, and in the background there are snow-covered pastures. Spring is considered as a turning point in the Soviet history of art. For the first time since the introduction of socialist realism a work of art showed an unpolitical everyday life scene in Soviet Union, without bringing any political message, as could be found in Plastov's earlier works that glorified the collectivization.

During his artistic career Plastov was awarded two Orders of Lenin, he was laureate of the Stalin Prize, (1946), Lenin Prize (1966) and he also (in 1972, posthumously) was nominated for the State Prize of the RSFSR named Ilya Repin – for his painting Balefire in a Field, Out of the Past and a series of portraits of his contemporaries.

== Notable works ==
- 1946:The First Snow
- 1947: Haymaking
- 1954: Spring

== Museum collections ==
- Plastov's page on the State Tretyakov Gallery portal.
- Smolensk State Museum-Reserve (Plastov' Guest from the Front Line 1944)
- Plastov Solo Exhibition, 2013. State Russian Museum, St Petersburg
- Tver Regional Art Gallery
- Perm State Art Gallery
- Ekaterinburg Fine Art Museum
- Chelyabinsk State Fine Art Museum
- State Art Museum of Nizhny Novgorod
- Samara Art Museum
- Ulyanovsk Regional Art Museum
- Volgograd Fine Art Museum искусств
- Saratov State Art Museum
- Astrakhan State Art Gallery
- Rostov-on-Don Regional Fine Art Museum
- Kursk State Art Gallery
- Tula Regional Art Museum
- State Art Museum of Altai Krai, Barnaul (Plastov' Portrait of the Artist Kiselyov 1961)
- Primorye State Art Gallery (Plastov' Letter 1971; p. 3)
- Primorye State Fine Art Gallery, Vladivostok
- Irkutsk Art Museum (Plastov' Tractor Drivers' Supper 1951, up stairs, to the right).

== Bibliography ==
- Brown, Matthew Cullerne; Taylor, Brandon (1993). Art of the Soviets: painting, sculpture, and architecture in a one-party state, 1917–1992. Manchester University Press ND. ISBN 978-0-7190-3735-1. pp. vi, 75, 77, 83, 84, 131, 137, 184, 226.
- Christ, Thomas: Der Sozialistische Realismus. Betrachtungen zum Sozialistischen Realismus in der Sowjetzeit. Basel: Wiese Verlag 1999.
- Сказка про мальчика, понимавшего язык земли : Аркадий Пластов / Е. В. Мурашова. — Москва : Белый город, 2001. — 10 с. : ил. — (Сказки о художниках). — ISBN 5-7793-0607-9 (children's book, on Russian)
- Борисовская, Н. А./ Гордон, Е. С. (Hrsg.): Русские художники от А до Я. Москва: Слово 2000. ISBN 5850502319. S. 138 (on Russian).

== Video links ==
- Film by A. Ignashov, with Plastov's lifetime shooting, on Russian, 35 min.
- Arkady Plastov and realistic Russian painting after World War II, on Russian 17 min.
- Film depicted the celebration of 120-year Anniversary of A. Plastov and Jubilee Exhibition, Moscow, 2013 on Russian, 59 min.
