= Haymaking (Arkady Plastov) =

Painting by Arkady Plastov

- Artist: Arkady Plastov
- Year: 1945
- Medium: Oil on canvas
- Dimensions: 293 cm × 198 cm (115 in × 78 in)
- Location: State Tretyakov Gallery, Moscow

External image
- Haymaking by Arkady Plastov

Haymaking (Russian: Сенокос) is a painting by Russian Soviet artist Arkady Plastov. The painting embodied the artist's hope for a better future, for the arrival of a peaceful life. An everyday episode depicted in the painting Haymaking acquires a sublime meaning thanks to the monumentality of the canvas. At the same time, the canvas is filled with lyricism and the pictures are poetry.

It was created in 1945 in the village of Prislonikha, Ulyanovsk Oblast. The models were fellow villagers of the artist. The canvas was first presented to a wide audience in 1946 at the I All-Union Art Exhibition. Together with Plastov's painting Harvest, it was awarded the Stalin State Prize of the I degree for 1945. The painting Haymaking is in the collection of the State Tretyakov Gallery (permanent exhibition of Russian art of the 20th and 21st centuries in the New Tretyakov Gallery, Hall No. 28). Plastov's paintings of the mid-1940s are, as before, full of dynamism, but at this time, he began to turn less frequently to multi-figure compositions. According to a number of art historians, Haymaking is one of the highlights of the artist's work, his milestone.

== Description ==
From the edge of the birch forest come four mowers: "...an old man with a gray beard, a stout man with red hair, a woman who is not old but has worked hard, and a sturdy teenager, almost a boy". Art historians believe that this is a family: the old man, his son, his daughter-in-law, and his grandson. Nearby is a high wall of colorful grass, a beautiful view of the forest, and above the heads of the figures, the blue sky. In the grass, one can easily discern flowers painted in detail by the artist: repens, ivan-da-maryas, campanulas, chamomiles, dictamnus albus, lilies, forest primrose, clover, onopordum, and trollius. Bumblebees, butterflies, and flower chafers float in the air. According to art historian Tatiana Plastova, the artist has combined on one canvas plants that do not bloom at the same time and do not meet in one clearing. He does not simply depict a flowering meadow but creates an allegory of summer, as if he were laying all the flowers of the motherland at the feet of his heroes.

Galina Shubina believed that the painting depicted two old men, a woman, and a teenager, which, in her opinion, alluded to the death of adult men in the war or the fact that they had not yet been demobilized. Through the representation of their absence, the theme of death appears. The faces of the heroes of the painting are harsh and do not resemble the cheerful collective peasants of Arkady Plastov's pre-war paintings. In the center of the composition, the artist places a boy—an image that leaves hope for revival and replenishment of human losses during the war years.

Arkady Plastov himself wrote about the painting Haymaking in a letter to his wife on November 28, 1945:

The subject itself, the innumerable flowers, the glitter and sparkle of the sun in the sky on the branches of the birches, on the trunks, the rustling and fluttering of the leaves and grasses, the figures of the mowers drowned in greenish-golden reflections, in the transparent crystalline atmosphere, in the barely perceptible blue of the morning air, the caressing colorfulness of the softly swaying flowers, their fragrant tenderness, brought by me to the possible limit of illusion and color—all this appears before my eyes at the first glance as a kind of fairy-tale vision.

In the article Conversation about Still Life (1973), Arkady Plastov's son Nikolai, corresponding member of the Russian Academy of Arts, wrote about the painting Haymaking as a huge still life, where flowers and leaves of birch trees are its separate elements. This still life is complicated by “crazy difficulties in conveying the play of light and shadows under the midday sun”.

== Background ==
External image
- | Arkady Plastov mowing grass. Photo of the 1940s

Haymaking was Plastov's hobby. (Note: Tatiana Plastova, for example, claimed that the proof of this could be the fact that the artist of the huge novel Anna Karenina made even two versions of the illustration for the episode Levin at the Mowing.) In one of the photographs from the mid-1940s, the topless artist is mowing grass. Even at eighty years old, during haymaking, Arkady Plastov would set aside his easel, lock up his studio, and, taking a scythe and a sharpening bar in his hands, go to a forest clearing long before sunrise to mow the grass. This theme also repeatedly appeared in his works.

External videos
- | The videotape was made in January 1993, when an exhibition at the Academy of Arts was being prepared for the artist's centenary

The painting Haymaking was painted in 1945 based on sketches collected long before that. Inga Filippova argued that the idea of the canvas existed even before World War II, but remained unrealized on canvas. Another point of view was expressed by contemporary Russian art historian Tatiana Plastova. The earliest sketch on this subject she dated to the 1910s, and the 1930s belong to several works created by the artist on this theme; one of these paintings was even shown in 1935 in Vsekohudozhnik. This painting (its location is unknown) Plastov evaluated quite highly and wrote: “Among the bland other things, from my ... ‘Haymaking’ (despite a lot of its shortcomings, due to my exceptional laziness and laxity) reeked of some ... surprising freshness and chastity ...” According to Tatiana Plastova, this painting marked for the artist a departure from the traditions of Russian realism of the 19th century to the light and color forms of impressionism. “I love haymaking to the point of self-forgetfulness, having been a mower myself since I was seventeen years old. Many years ago I began to collect sketches of haymaking for a future painting. I made my first sketch on the theme of haymaking about twenty-five to twenty-seven years ago. In the fire of 1931, together with other good things, burned sketches, including the first sketches of numerous compositions. By 1935, I had gathered both materials and courage to paint and present it publicly. My clumsy brainchild, as I recall, met with the most cordial reception, and I was praised in every possible way. But, as it always happens, after the public viewing, my eyes seemed to open suddenly on the picture,” wrote Plastov himself. The artist was disappointed with the canvas, on which he tried to place so many “details dear to his heart,” because he failed to find their correct ratio. He began to collect material again, but this work was stopped by the outbreak of the Great Patriotic War. The idea was abandoned, and the artist returned to it only in 1944. In the summer of that year, he worked on sketches for the painting, and in the spring of 1945, he began work on the canvas itself. Arkady Plastov described his idea in his autobiography:

“... When I was painting this picture, I kept thinking: well now rejoice, brother, every leaf, rejoice—death is over, life has begun... Everything must be filled with a powerful breath of sincerity, truth, and optimism. This mood determined the content of my new painting Haymaking, which I completed for the All-Union Art Exhibition in 1946”.

In the painting Haying Arkady Plastov expressed hope for the future and joy of peaceful life after the war. A moment in the painting acquires a special meaning due to its monumentality. The canvas is filled with lyricism and poetry. The war forced the artist to depict not only external events, but also the inner world of man. According to Valery Kuznetsov, Plastov portrayed people as courageous and hardworking. In turn, Kuznetsov believed that Plastov's paintings reflected the ideology of late Stalinism, which included Russian nationalism, a return to pre-revolutionary values, an emphasis on the positive qualities of the common man, and a belief in the improvement of life. This ideology resonated with the artist's personal ideas.

== Models ==
External images
- | Arkady Plastov. Fyodor Tonshin, 1930
- | Arkady Plastov. Pyotr Chernyaev, 1948
- | Arkady Plastov. Reaper (depicting Pyotr Chernyaev), 1951-1952

His relatives and residents of the village of Prislonikha in the Ulyanovsk region, where Plastov was born and lived, served as models for the artist:

- The young man in the foreground is the artist's son Nikolai. Nikolai Arkadyevich Plastov (1930-2000) graduated from the Moscow Surikov State Academic Institute of Fine Arts, in the workshop of D. K. Mochalsky, and became known as a painter, photographer, and public figure. He was an honored artist of Russia, secretary of the Union of Artists of the RSFSR, and a corresponding member of the Russian Academy of Arts. Nikolai Plastov was the author of genre paintings, portraits, and landscapes. There is a photograph from the mid-1940s, when the painting Haymaking was created, showing Arkady Plastov together with his son Nikolai in a mowed meadow. The artist is holding a scythe, while his teenage son has a rake.
- The woman in the white shawl appears to be the artist's wife, Natalia Alekseevna. Natalia Alekseevna, née von Wieck, married Plastov in 1925. She lived in Prislonikha for more than half a century, preserving the traditional way of life of the family associated with hard daily labor.
- The elderly mower is Fyodor Sergeevich Tonshin, a fellow countryman of Plastov. Fyodor Tonshin was among Plastov's favorite sitters. Tonshin's portrait studies were included in the compositions of many of the artist's paintings. Plastov was attracted by the expression of surprise and childlike vulnerability in his face. In the portrait of Fyodor Tonshin (1940s, canvas, oil, 66 × 49 cm), candidate of art history Inga Filippova notes that the artist “marks such subtle facets of character, which do not often become defining in the peasant portraits created by him”. The portrait Fyodor Tonshin (1930s, canvas, oil, 57.0 × 49.5 cm) is almost monochromatic. The artist used ochre and its shades, as well as small additions of other colors (this coloring is typical of all portraits of Tonshin created by Plastov).
- Another elderly mower is Pyotr Grigorievich Chernyaev. Like Tonshin, he is a fellow countryman of Plastov. He was also frequently painted by the artist. Plastov appreciated Chernyaev’s colorful appearance — he was a gray-haired old man with a thick beard and a kind, sunburned face. Plastov saw in him the qualities that, in his mind, represented the most typical features of the Russian peasant. Pyotr Chernyaev also posed for Plastov in the painting Reaper (1951-1952, canvas, oil, 128 × 70 cm).

Farmers were accustomed to seeing Arkady Plastov with a notebook and a pencil in the hayfield, and they tried to assist the artist as much as they could while he worked on the canvas. Especially for him, fellow villagers were willing to stand motionless with scythes in their hands or, conversely, to walk an extra time in front of the artist while he was drawing in his notebook.

== Exhibition history ==
According to art historian Natalia Alexandrova, Arkady Plastov's painting Haymaking and the canvas Harvest (canvas, oil, 166 × 219 cm, State Tretyakov Gallery, inventory number — 27650), created in 1945, formed a cohesive cycle. Both works were presented together at the I All-Union Art Exhibition in 1946. Harvest depicts a field with an old man, a girl, a grandson, and a dog, where peasants are eating from a large pot. Plastov transported the paintings to Moscow in November 1945 on the footboard of a train, as he informed his wife in a letter. Reviews of Haymaking were enthusiastic: Plastov noted that viewers called the painting a hymn, a song, or a poem.

The painting Haymaking is executed in oil on canvas and measures 198 × 293 cm (or 197 × 293.5 cm). In 1945, Haymaking and Harvest were awarded the Stalin Prize of the First Degree, amounting to 100,000 rubles. The award was accompanied by a scandal when an anonymous letter accused Haymaking of "formalism and Western influences".

The painting Haymaking is in the collection of the State Tretyakov Gallery (inventory number — 27649). It was displayed for a long time in the XX Century Hall of the museum and is currently featured in the 20th and 21st Century Russian Art section at the New Tretyakov Gallery on Krymsky Val.

== Critical reception ==
=== Soviet art historians ===
Art historian Boris Nikiforov wrote about Haymaking in the monograph Soviet Genre Painting (1961):

"The painting shines with the brightness of colors, mastery in conveying sunlight, and the play of light reflections on the faces and clothes of the mowers, on the white trunks of beautiful birch trees rising from the thicket of flowers and grasses. It conveys the beauty and generosity of the Russian summer, the transparency of the morning air, awakening memories of the cuckoo's call, the ringing of the scythe, and the sensation of touching a cool, dewy branch. The artist depicted lush thickets of colorful and bright field flowers and grasses. Some parts of the canvas seem to transform into a living floral carpet, reminiscent of Russian folk decorative art."

Nikiforov compared the painting to a fragment of Aleksandr Tvardovsky's poem "The House by the Road" (Russian: «Дом у дороги»), which describes a hayfield.

Candidate of Art History Lev Mochalov, in his book The Artist, the Picture, the Viewer: Conversations about Painting (1963), wrote that in Plastov's paintings dedicated to the life and labor of collective farmers, the native land plays a significant role. In Haymaking, it is covered with exuberant summer blossom. It is not merely a stage on which the action unfolds, but a "deeply emotional image". It is connected with a person, reflecting his thoughts and feelings and conveying his mood. In a somewhat later book, The Inimitability of Talent (1966), Mochalov noted Plastov's sense of responsibility to his contemporaries. Plastov does not create "Potemkin villages" on his canvases, acknowledging the difficulties experienced by the village during the war and postwar years. That is why, in the "joyful, saturated with bright colors" painting Haymaking, the artist shows that “the mowing crew was diverse: alongside able-bodied men, old men, teenagers, girls, and women stood in line. There was nothing to be done — it was war time. Those who were stronger were in the army”.

Boris Vipper, Doctor of Art History, and Rafail Kaufman, Candidate of Art History, in an article in the 13th (additional) volume of the multi-volume History of Russian Art (1964), characterize Arkady Plastov's paintings Harvest and Haymaking as "full of life-affirming force". Both paintings are imbued with a high sense of patriotism, depicting the labor of collective-farmers during the war years. At that time, women, old men, and children worked in the fields. The authors note that while both paintings feature simple people, their images embody the immense strength of the people. In Haymaking, Plastov succeeded in creating a vivid image of nature — "a hot summer day with the intoxicating coolness of the birch grove and with shimmering, elegant colors of the blooming meadow".

Not all art-critics accepted the painting. Some "experts" argued that such a profusion of flowers in the forest does not occur in late June, and that the mowers are positioned too closely together, suggesting they might cut each other's heels. In response to this latter critique, Arkady Plastov claimed that he deliberately brought the figures closer together to convey the collectivity of labor and a unified labor-impulse. In 1948, Yaroslav Nikolaev, chairman of the board of the Leningrad branch of the Union of Artists, participating in a discussion on Soviet art, commented: "I see a realistic moment in Plastov's Haymaking, where you do not see the act of haymaking, but rather the illumination of flowers, which overwhelms the image of the mowers, making them seem like an additional accessory to this abundance of colorful strokes. It is certainly a realistic moment."

Art historian Vladimir I. Kostin, in his book Among Artists (1986), analyzing the creative method of Arkady Plastov, noted the inherent "principle of unintentional randomness in the composition of the canvas". By this he meant the artist’s desire to depict an event or phenomenon from village life exactly as he observed it, "without rearranging or removing anything in the picture". Consequently, Kostin observed what he considered "excessive proximity, crowding, and piling up of figures and objects" in some of Plastov's works. One such painting he cited was Haymaking. In this painting, the mowers not only appear too close to each other, but the surrounding meadow and birch-tree trunks are brought to the foreground, akin to a still life, where all objects are presented at the closest distance to the viewer — at the edge of the table.

Some accused Plastov of excessive enthusiasm for Impressionism. The most persistent criticisms were directed at the paintings Haymaking and Kolkhoz Threshing Floor. One critic from the mid-1940s wrote: "The influence of Impressionism is felt in Plastov's work, interfering with this great artist—realist... The external decorative effect was pulled by impressionistic influences." Modern Russian art historian Tatiana Plastova acknowledged that almost all Russian artists of the early-20th century experienced the influence of Impressionism, but only in this limited sense can one talk about the use of certain Impressionist techniques in Arkady Plastov's work. These techniques include “the brightening of painting, the synthesis of the sketch with the finished work, the desire to depict "what you see" rather than "what you know", and, finally, the assertion of a new substantive reality." The irritation was caused not only by Plastov's impressionistic approach but also by his disregard for the task assigned to artists by the Party — to serve the Soviet ideological machine. Plastov tried to remain independent of the official ideology.

Irina Emelyanova, the author of the book about the artist published in 1971 by the publishing-house Fine Art, believed that the intensity of color in the painting creates a sense of triumph of life over death: the rich emerald color of grass and birch leaves is contrasted with the multi-colored blooming of meadow grasses. In her opinion, Plastov produces a "hyperbolicity of color" (Russian: «гиперболичность цвета»). At one of the exhibitions where the painting was presented, disputes arose due to its unusual brightness. At a meeting with visitors to the Tretyakov Gallery, Plastov, smiling, remarked that he would be pleased if his canvases could convey even a tenth of the brightness of color that actually exists in nature. In his autobiography, published in 1972, the artist replied to critics:

"The summer of '45 was full of herbs and flowers as tall as a man. The rows had to be twice as long as usual, otherwise the scythe would not be able to get through, and the swath of cut flowers would not be able to dry. In addition to all this, the mowers were different: alongside able-bodied men stood teenagers, girls, and women."

Poster-painter and art-historian Igor Dolgopolov wrote about the painting Haymaking: "It is as if we hear how each flower of this thousand-colored bouquet of tones, and how lilac, blue, azure, turquoise, yellow, saffron, crimson, scarlet, purple, and gold colors ring with delicate chords. The trumpets of the white birch trees sound powerfully, and as an accompaniment to this polyphony of June, the scattered silver trill of the vibrating summer breeze touches millions of leaves." According to Dolgopolov, Haymaking is a symphonic poem, a hymn to the native land and to the people who won the war. He notes the metaphorical language of the painter — behind the most ancient plot of rural life, haymaking, and "behind all this bubbling joy of life", the viewer of that time saw the suffering and death that the people overcame during the recently ended war.

=== Modern reception ===
Contrasting the canvases Harvest. Year 44 and Haymaking, painted around the same time, People's Artists of the USSR Sergei and Alexei Tkachev wrote in their article “A Word about A. A. Plastov (to the 90th Anniversary of the Artist)” that the former “reeks” of power. They describe Harvest as featuring “the image of an old man, mighty and strong in spirit, sharing a modest meal with teenage children in the field, akin to Surikov’s images.” They note that the composition and painting of Harvest are “tart, strong, and every image and every detail is convincing, clear, and cannot fail to excite”. The Tkachevs labeled Harvest as a truly folk painting. In contrast, they suggest that Haymaking should be perceived as a hymn to the great victory over the enemy.

Soviet and Russian art historian Alexander Morozov views Arkady Plastov's Haymaking as both an heir to the realism of the Peredvizhniki and a precursor to the harsh “village prose” of the 1960s. He contrasts the painting with Ivan Pyryev's film Cossacks of the Kuban (1949), describing Haymaking as “a celebration of the village summer, blossoming after the military storm, but a holiday marred by the hunger of the first months of peace and the bitter sweat of inexhaustible peasant labor on the land”. Doctor of Historical Sciences Valery Kuznetsov, in his article Arkady Alexandrovich Plastov and the Ideology of Late Stalinism (2004), which appears in both conference proceedings and on the Moscow State University's Faculty of History website, analyzes the ideological foundations of Plastov's work. Kuznetsov argues that Haymaking praises the beauty of Russian nature and people, demonstrating the continuity between the old (Tsarist) and new (Socialist) Russia. He describes the painting as a masterpiece, one to which “it is difficult to add anything and impossible to surpass”.

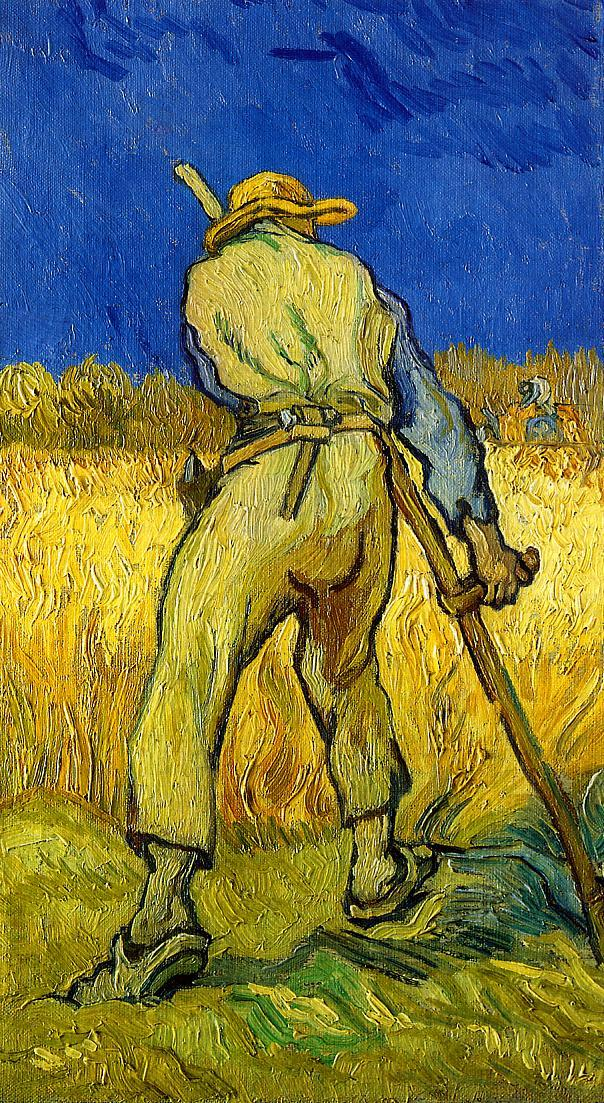
Vincent van Gogh, the Reaper

Doctor of Art History Vladimir Lenyashin notes the vividness of the depiction of labor in Haymaking. Modern art historian Tatiana Plastova identifies a pronounced influence of Impressionism in the painting as well as in the preparatory studies and sketches for it. In her book Arkady Plastov's Country and World (2018), Plastova provides a detailed analysis of Haymaking. She categorizes the painting as part of the “triumphant, victorious” works by Plastov from the late 1940s, contrasting it with his tragic wartime paintings and the “poetry” of his works from the 1950s and 1960s. Plastova describes Haymaking as a hymn to Victory (“The flowers of the Haymaking, all the flowers of the Motherland — at the feet of the winners”) over Nazi Germany. She also notes that the artist, during the creation process and at the initial exhibitions, saw the painting as part of a diptych with Harvest (its original title, according to the artist's son, was Harvest. Year 1943, and Plastov intended to exhibit it under this title). As such, they formed “a complex semantic unity, far from the officially accepted later unambiguously optimistic interpretation”. Plastova correlated Harvest with Vincent van Gogh's painting The Reaper and attributed to it the meaning of “the harvest of death”. Van Gogh himself described his painting as “the image of death, in the form in which the great book of nature reveals it to us”. Nikolai Plastov's son Nikolai noted in his writings that his father's painting was originally titled Year 1943 and then, for some time, had a double title, as described by Nikolai Plastov, Harvest. Year 1943. According to the notes, the father “would have liked to see it under this title”.

The festive Haymaking, from Plastova's perspective, also implies the presence of death in the world. The art historian reinforces this idea with the words of the artist himself in his autobiography: “When I was working on that painting I couldn't stop thinking: well, now rejoice, brother, rejoice in every leaf—death is over, life has begun”.

Tatyana Plastova described the back part of the canvas as a landscape, noting that in the foreground it transitions into “an attentive but equally freely painted still life with recognizable images of flowers, bumblebees, butterflies, and bronzeflies—all living their own special, incomprehensible life”. She correlated this part of the painting with the works of Dutch and Flemish masters of still life, suggesting that Plastov infused these elements with new content. According to her, the general symbolic meaning of the “victorious” canvas was enhanced with the semantics of memento mori. Plastova argued that the idea of the fragility of existence, which she associated with memento mori, “is present in all, even the most joyful paintings” of the artist. She specifically noted the broken sunflower in The Fair and the depiction of a dying tree in The Death of a Tree as examples. Plastova perceived the presence of flowers in Haymaking that do not bloom simultaneously and could not naturally coexist in the same meadow as an “allegory of endless summer, eternal life,” thereby seemingly overcoming the theme of death implied by the plot itself, rather than merely depicting a blooming meadow. She remarked that a painting like Haymaking had not yet been seen in Russian art, noting that the artist combined “developed and reinterpreted” techniques of impressionism with the semantics of traditional easel painting.

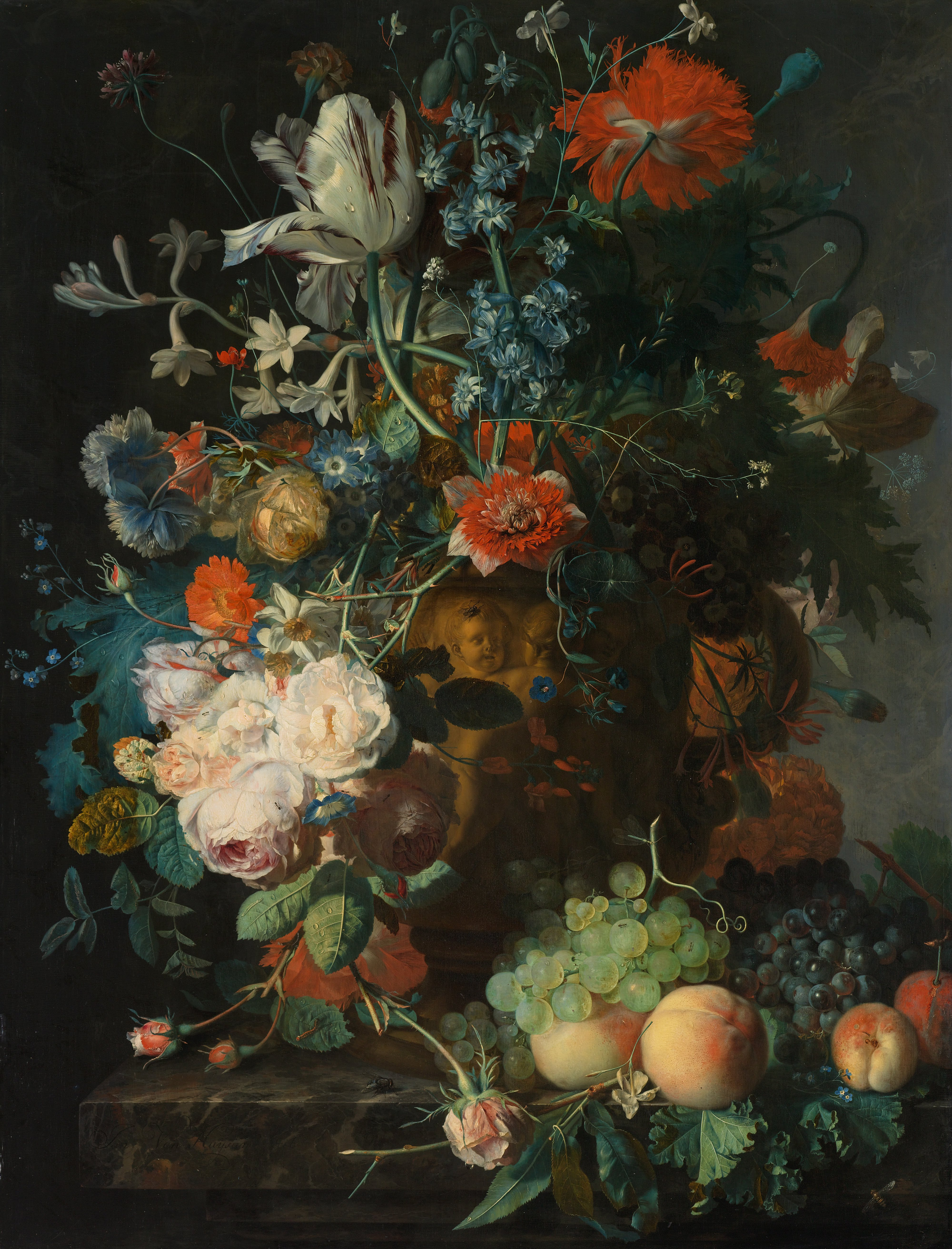
Jan van Huysum. Still Life with Flowers and Fruit, between 1700 and 1749.

According to Professor Vladimir Sysoev, the painting Haymaking is striking for its picturesque details, which are elevated to the level of spiritualized, well-fitted particles that radiate the fullness of limitless material elements, the life-giving power of the earth and the sun. These details make us believe in the irreversible triumph of truth and justice. The vibrant blooming of nature aligns with the celebratory atmosphere of the painting. However, despite its optimistic tone, the painting does not idealize its time. Arkady Plastov compels viewers to recognize that “the desired time has not yet come”, as harsh necessity still prevails everywhere, serving as a reminder of the brutal consequences of the recent war. There are no bright contrasts or disharmony in the painting. It is closely aligned with genre painting. While theatricalization and planned plotlines, characteristic of some of the artist's works, are only subtly outlined here, the composition and color scheme of the painting are meticulously thought out. According to Slovak art historian Martin Lizonja, both nature and the mowers are central to the painting. Rather than disturbing the integrity of nature with their labor, the mowers form a unity with it and blend into its space. However, Lizonja notes that the relationship between the male and female characters on the canvas may appear somewhat unnatural. The male and female figures are united only by their common labor and its results. Lizonja claims that while Plastov's works possess a sense of “erotic tension,” the characters in his paintings seem to be devoid of carnal sexuality. There is no physical contact among the figures. Martin Lizonja believes that the space of Plastov's paintings can be characterized by the Arcadia's description given by James Hall in his Dictionary of Subjects and Symbols in Art: “Arcadia. A pastoral paradise ruled by Pan (the god of sheep and cattle) and inhabited by shepherds and shepherdesses, nymphs and satyrs, all in an atmosphere of exalted love”. However, instead of exalted love, Soviet pastoral art like Plastov’s depicts a more disembodied love.

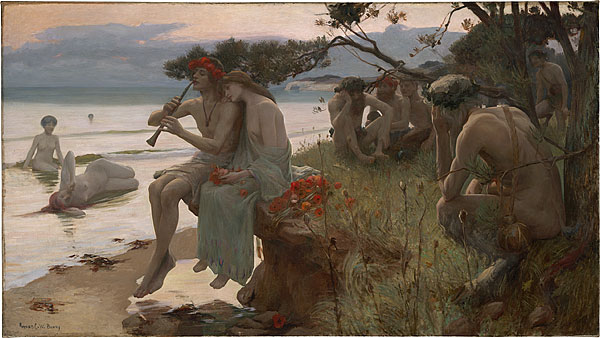
Rupert Bunny, Pastorale

Inga Filippova, an employee of the State Russian Museum, noted that the composition of Haymaking is based on the juxtaposition of diagonal lines (along the outline of the group of mowers in the center of the canvas) and vertical lines (along the direction of the birch tree trunks on the right side of the canvas). The spatial arrangement of the painting contrasts the near and far planes. The landscape in the foreground is meticulously detailed, with the artist employing a range of texture strokes, from bold to delicate. This technique adds nuanced variations of color spots with differing densities and directions to the play of light and shadow. According to Filippova, the masterful distribution of dark and light areas on the picture plane is a key element of the painting’s compositional concept.According to Filippova, Plastov's paintings from the mid-1940s retain their dynamism, though he less frequently employed multi-figure compositions during this period. The characters in his mid-1940s works are often depicted in silent reflection. Several art historians regard Haymaking as one of the high points of the artist's career, representing a significant stage in his oeuvre.

In the article “The Artistic Legacy of A. A. Plastov as a Visual Source on the History of the Collective Farm Village of the Stalinist Period” (2019), Oleg Khasyanov, Pyotr Kabytov, and Lilia Galimova argue that Arkady Plastov's paintings Haymaking and Harvest “not only depict the appearance of the collective farm village that emerged from the war but also convey the public mood of the peasants in that victorious year.” According to the authors, Haymaking captures the festive mood of the peasants, illustrating not only their communal labor but also reflecting the changes in “age and labor composition” within the collective farm during the war.

== In culture ==
In 2013, the official YouTube channel of the State Tretyakov Gallery presented a series of videos titled A. A. Plastov and the Painting of the Sixties as part of the project Masterpieces of the Tretyakov Gallery. The centerpiece of the first part is the analysis of the painting Haymaking by the host of the program Fyodor Balandin and Natalia Alexandrova, head of the Department of Painting of the Second Half of the 20th Century at the museum.

Arkady Plastov's painting Haymaking is actively used in modern textbooks for middle school. In the textbook Fine Arts for Grade 2 (2020), edited by Natalia Sokolnikova, schoolchildren are invited to compare Haymaking with Wassily Kandinsky's painting Red Square, analyzing the content, color scheme, shape, and arrangement of objects, as well as exploring the lives and works of the artists to prepare a report.

In the textbook Fundamentals of Secular Ethics for Grade 4 (2016), edited by Natalia Vinogradova, Haymaking illustrates the section on the rules of family labor, describing labor activities in a peasant family and the division of responsibilities. In the textbook Surrounding World. Grade 2, the painting is highlighted in the section “Picture Gallery” with a task for students about the role of weeds in nature. '

== Bibliography ==
=== Primary sources ===
- Пластов, А. А. (1972). Автобиография (in Russian). Художник: Журнал. p. 16. ISSN 0131-7555.
- Пластов, А. А. (2018). Автобиография // Пластова Т. Ю. Аркадий Пластов. «От этюда к картине». Статьи, воспоминания, материалы (in Russian). М.: Фонд «Связь эпох». pp. 190–198.
- Пластов, Н. А. (1973). Разговор о натюрморте (in Russian). Vol. 6 (July). Художник: Журнал. — Союз художников РСФСР. ISSN 0131-7555.

=== Researches and non-fiction sources ===
- Авдонин-Бирючёвский, А. М. (2006). Аркадий Александрович Пластов (in Russian). Ульяновск: Корпорация технологий продвижения. p. 55.
- Виппер Б. Р., Кауфман Р. С. (1964). Живопись // История русского искусства (in Russian). Vol. XIII. Дополнительный. М.: Наука. pp. 164–221.
- Дедюхин, В. А. (1970). Краски Прислонихи (О художнике А. Пластове) (in Russian). Саратов: Приволжское книжное издательство. p. 104.
- Долгополов, И. В. (1988). Аркадий Пластов // Мастера и шедевры (in Russian). Vol. III. М.: Изобразительное искусство. pp. 283–314.
- Емельянова, И. Д. (1971). Аркадий Пластов (in Russian). М.: Изобразительное искусство. p. 56.
- Козлов Ю. В., Авдонин А. М. (2013). Жизнь и судьба Аркадия Пластова. Ульяновск: Корпорация технологий продвижения. ISBN 978-5-946-55237-0.
- Костин, В. И. (1956). Аркадий Александрович Пластов (in Russian). М.: Советский художник. p. 55.
- Костин, В. И. (1986). Деревня Аркадия Пластова // Среди художников (in Russian). М.: Советский художник. pp. 38–42.
- Кузнецов, В. Н. (2004a). Аркадий Александрович Пластов и идеология позднего сталинизма (in Russian). Публикация на сайте исторического факультета МГУ.
- Кузнецов, В. Н. (2004b). Аркадий Александрович Пластов и идеология позднего сталинизма // Творчество А. А. Пластова в контексте культуры XX века. Сборник докладов III Поливановских чтений (19 May 2003) (in Russian). Ульяновск: Ульяновский областной художественный музей. pp. 24–27.
- Леняшин, В. А. (2018). «Словарный запас» пластовской эпопеи // Пластова Т. Ю. Аркадий Пластов. «От этюда к картине». Статьи, воспоминания, материалы (in Russian). М.: Фонд «Связь эпох». pp. 6–17.
- Леонтьева, Г. К. (1965). Аркадий Александрович Пластов. Народная библиотечка по искусству (in Russian). Л.: Художник РСФСР.
- Лизонь, М. (2011). Пасторали Аркадия Пластова. К вопросу об эклектичности социалистического реализма и его постмодернистской деконструкции (PDF) (in Russian). Человек. Образ и сущность. Гуманитарные аспекты. Современный человек. Движение к пасторали?: Ежегодник. pp. 188–200. ISSN 1728-9319. Archived from the original (PDF) on 2019-02-14.
- Морозов, А. И. (2010). Подвиг и Слава. Искусство на войне (in Russian). Третьяковская галерея: Журнал. pp. 5–32. ISSN 1729-7621.
- Мочалов, Л. В. (1966). Прикосновение к земле // Неповторимость таланта (in Russian). Л.—М.: Искусство. pp. 127–132.
- Мочалов, Л. В. (1963). Художник, картина, зритель. Беседы о живописи (in Russian). Л.: Художник РСФСР.
- Никифоров, Б. М. (1961). Советская жанровая живопись (in Russian). Л.: Издательство Академии художеств СССР.
- Пластова, Т. Ю. (2021). Творчество А. А. Пластова в европейском контексте. Диссертация на соискание учёной степени доктора искусствоведения (PDF) (in Russian). М.: Фонд «Связь эпох». p. 432.
- Пластова, Т. Ю. (2011). Пластов. Великие художники (in Russian). М.: Директ-Медиа, Комсомольская правда. p. 48. ISBN 978-5-7475-0082-2.
- Пластова, Т. Ю. (2018). Страна и мир Аркадия Пластова // Пластова Т. Ю. Аркадий Пластов. «От этюда к картине». Статьи, воспоминания, материалы (in Russian). М.: Фонд «Связь эпох». pp. 18–187.
- Ситнина, М. К. (1966). Времена года: русская пейзажная живопись (in Russian). М.: Искусство. p. 35.
- Ткачёв А. П., Ткачёв С. П. (1999). Слово о А. А. Пластове (к 90-летию художника) // Наши раздумья. Научное издание (in Russian). М.: Редакционно-издательский отдел НИИ Российской академии художеств. pp. 23–31.
- Сысоев, В. П. (2001). Аркадий Пластов (in Russian). М.: Белый город.
- Филиппова, И. И. (2018). Живопись Аркадия Пластова 1930—1960-х годов. Творческий метод и образно-смысловые структуры. Диссертация на соискание учёной степени кандидата искусствоведения (in Russian). СПб.: Санкт-Петербургский государственный академический институт живописи, скульптуры и архитектуры имени И. Е. Репина при Российской академии художеств. p. 182.
- Филиппова, И. И. (2008). "Некоторые аспекты портретной живописи в творчестве Аркадия Пластова". Вестник Южно-Уральского Государственного Университета. Серия: Социально-Гуманитарные Науки (in Russian). 10. Вестник Южно-Уральского государственного университета: Журнал: 85–90.
- Хасянов О. Р., Кабытов П. С., Галимова Л. Н. (2019). Художественное наследие А. А. Пластова как визуальный источник по истории колхозной деревни периода сталинизма (in Russian). Vol. 11. Научный диалог: Журнал. pp. 457–470. ISSN 2225-756X.
- Шубина, Г. (2014). Аркадий Пластов (1893—1972) // Епихин С., Рассказова А., Светляков К., Сидорова Н., Терехова С., Шклярская Я., Шубина Г. Государственная Третьяковская галерея на Крымском Валу. Искусство XX века. Путеводитель (in Russian). М.: Paulsen. pp. 166–167. ISBN 978-5-98797-080-5.

=== Textbooks and manuals ===
- Виноградова, Н. Ф. (2018). Окружающий мир. 2 класс. Учебник для учащихся общеобразовательных организаций. In 2 parts. — 7-е изд., стереотип. Российский учебник (in Russian). М.: Вентана-Граф. p. 114. ISBN 978-5-3600-7344-4.
- Виноградова, Н. Ф. (2016). Основы светской этики. 4 класс. Учебник для учащихся общеобразовательных организаций. In 2 parts. — 2-е изд., испр. и доп (in Russian). М.: Вентана-Граф. pp. 29–31. ISBN 978-5-3600-7398-7.
- Сокольникова, Н. М. (2020). Изобразительное искусство. 2 класс. Учебник. In 2 parts (in Russian). М.: Дрофа. p. 64. ISBN 978-5-0400-1166-7.
