= The Archangel Michael (icon) =

13th-century Russian icon

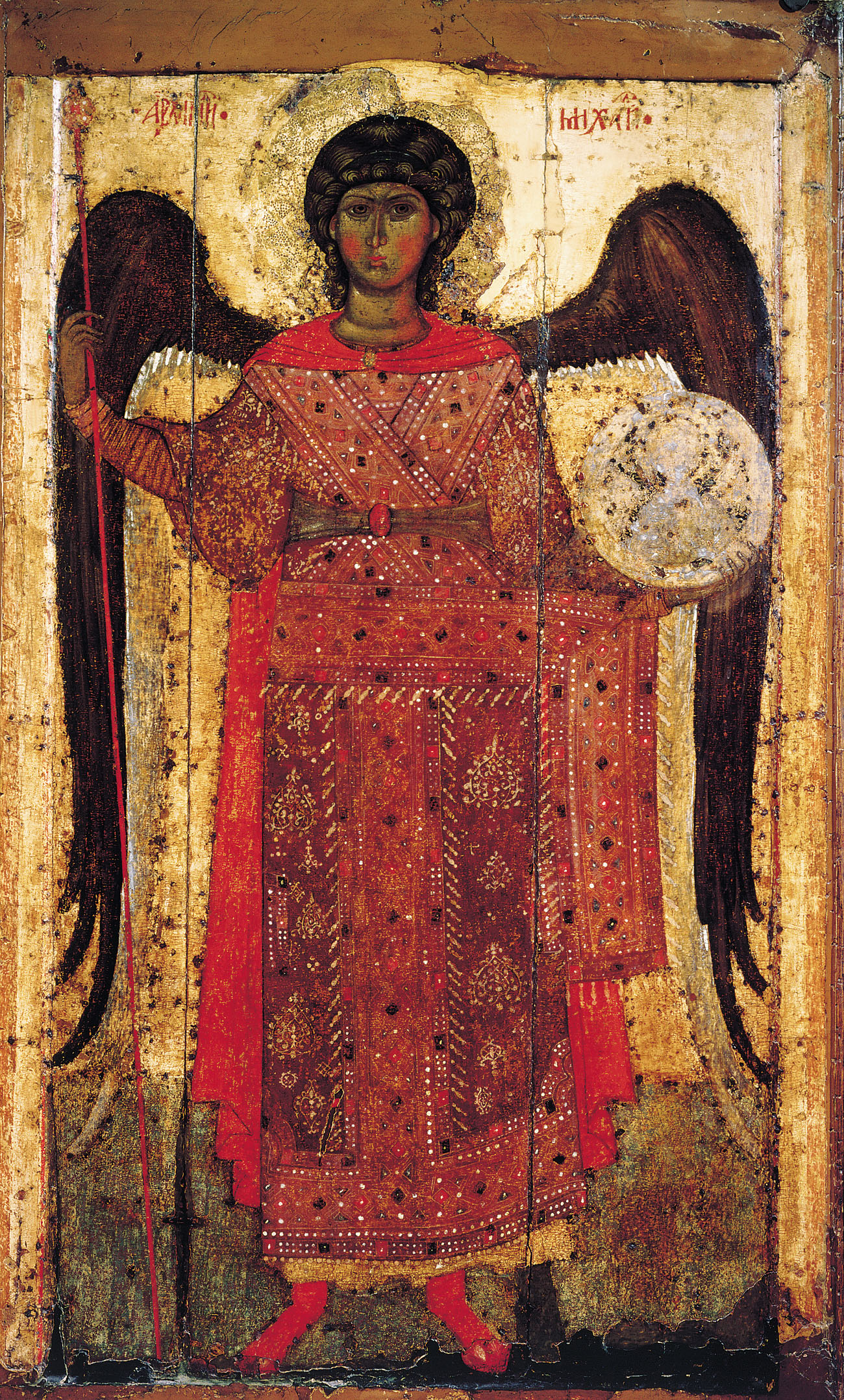
The Archangel Michael (13th century icon)

The Archangel Michael is a 13th-century icon, originating in a church dedicated to its subject (Archangel Michael) near the river Kotorosl in Iaroslavl in Russia – that church was built in 1216 by grand prince Constantin Vladimirski and restored in 1300 by princess Anne, wife of Theodore the Black. It shows Michael the Archangel. Its red and brown colour scheme is reminiscent of church frescoes around Kiev in north-east Russia between 1200 and 1250, whilst its composition recalls some miniatures of the evangelists from the 1220s and 1230–1233 produced for the Cathedral of the Nativity of the Theotokos, Suzdal.

In 1851 the historian S. А. Serebrenikov wrote of the icon "[it is] remarkable for its antiquity and its particularities in comparison to other stylistically similar icons – the silver riza of the archangel added in 1808, his crown, his silver and gilt zertsalo with precious stones and pearls". The riza he mentions is now lost – they were designed to protect icons from kisses by the faithful, but were often removed when icons were moved into museums. Like other precious antiquities from Iaroslavl, it was removed from its church and moved to the Tretiakov Gallery. Despite some paint loss, it was relatively well-conserved. A new gesso base was added and a new wooden plank on the reverse.

== See also ==
- List of oldest Russian icons

== Bibliography ==
- (in Russian) Mikhaïl Alpatov / Алпатов М. В. Краски древнерусской иконописи. — М.: Изобразительное искусство, 1974.
- (in German) Onasch K. Altrussische Ikonen. — Berlin, Union Verlag, 1977.
- (in Russian) Масленицын, Станислав Иванович|Масленицын С. И. Ярославская иконопись. — М.: Искусство, 1983. — Стр. 7.
- (in Russian) La Galerie Tretiakov. Catalogue des collections. Art ancien X au XV /Древнерусское искусство X — начала XV века. Том I. — М.: Красная площадь, 1995. — No. 41, стр. 109–111.
- (in Russian) Victor Lazarev / Лазарев В. Н. Русская иконопись от истоков до начала XVI века. — М.: Искусство, 2000. — Стр. 44, 168.
- (in Russian) Les icônes de la galerie Tretiakov / Иконопись ГТГ 2006. Иконопись из собрания Третьяковской галереи. — М.: Сканрус, 2006. — Стр. 116–117, илл.
- (in Russian) Polouchkina L. L. /Полушкина Л. Л. Ярославский календарь на 2000 год. Яр. 2000 г. // «Всесветлого мира горнего предивное украшение...» (К 700 — летию иконы «Архангел Михаил» из церкви Михаила Архангела г. Ярославля).
