= Tretyakov Gallery =

State Tretyakov Gallery
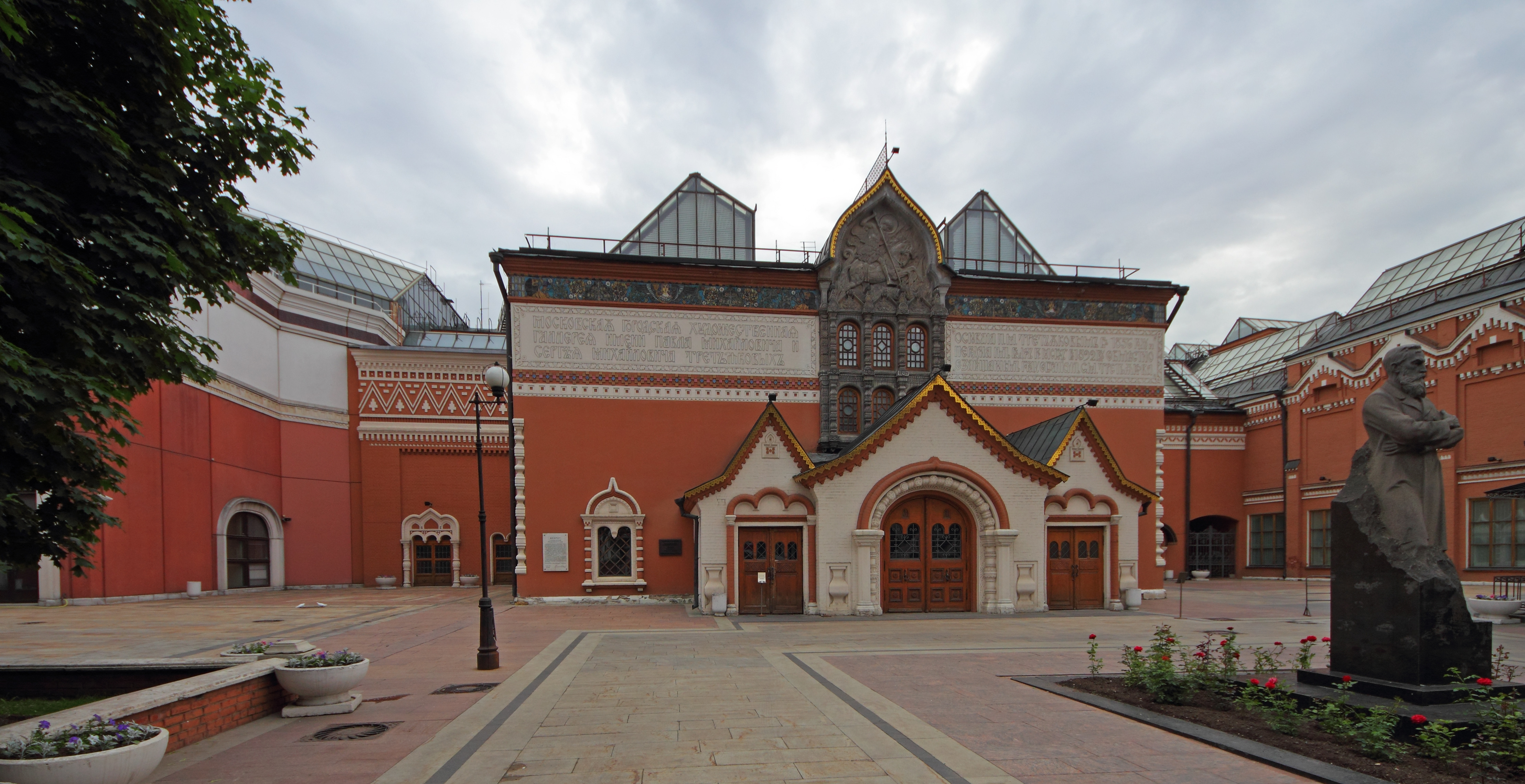
- Lavrushinsky Lane
- Interactive fullscreen map
- Established: 1856
- Location: Moscow, Russia
- Coordinates: 55°44′29″N 37°37′15″E
- Type: Art museum
- Visitors: 894,374 (2020): Ranked 3rd nationally; Ranked 13th globally
- Director: Elena Pronicheva
- Website: www.tretyakovgallery.ru?lang=en

The State Tretyakov Gallery (Russian: Государственная Третьяковская Галерея, romanized: Gosudarstvennaya Tretyakovskaya Galereya; abbreviated ГТГ, GTG) is an art gallery in Moscow, Russia, which is considered the foremost depository of Russian fine art in the world.

The gallery's history starts in 1856 when the Muscovite merchant Pavel Mikhailovich Tretyakov acquired works by Russian artists of his day with the aim of creating a collection, which might later grow into a museum of national art. In 1892, Tretyakov presented his already famous collection of approximately 2,000 works (1,362 paintings, 526 drawings, and 9 sculptures) to the Russian nation. The museum attracted 894,374 visitors in 2020 (down 68 percent from 2019, due to the COVID-19 pandemic). It was 13th on the list of most-visited art museums in the world in 2020.

The façade of the gallery building was designed by the painter Viktor Vasnetsov in a peculiar Russian fairy-tale style. It was built in 1902–04 to the south from the Moscow Kremlin. During the 20th century, the gallery expanded to several neighboring buildings, including the 17th-century church of St. Nicholas in Tolmachi. The collection contains more than 130,000 exhibits, ranging from the Theotokos of Vladimir to the monumental Composition VII by Wassily Kandinsky and the Black Square by Kazimir Malevich. In 1977 the Gallery kept a significant part of the George Costakis collection.

In May 2012, the Tretyakov Art Gallery played host to the prestigious FIDE World Chess Championship between Viswanathan Anand and Boris Gelfand as the organizers felt the event would promote both chess and art at the same time. In May 2023, the Tretyakov Gallery refused to hand over one of its most famous icons, Andrei Rublev's Trinity, to the Russian Orthodox Church. In June 2023 the icon was transferred to Moscow's main cathedral despite the museum's protests on the personal order of Russian President Vladimir Putin.

Administratively, the State Tretyakov Gallery organisation also includes a gallery of contemporary art in another part of central Moscow, and a number of other satellite galleries, including one in Kaliningrad, in the extreme west of Russia, and one in Vladivostok, in the far east.

== History ==
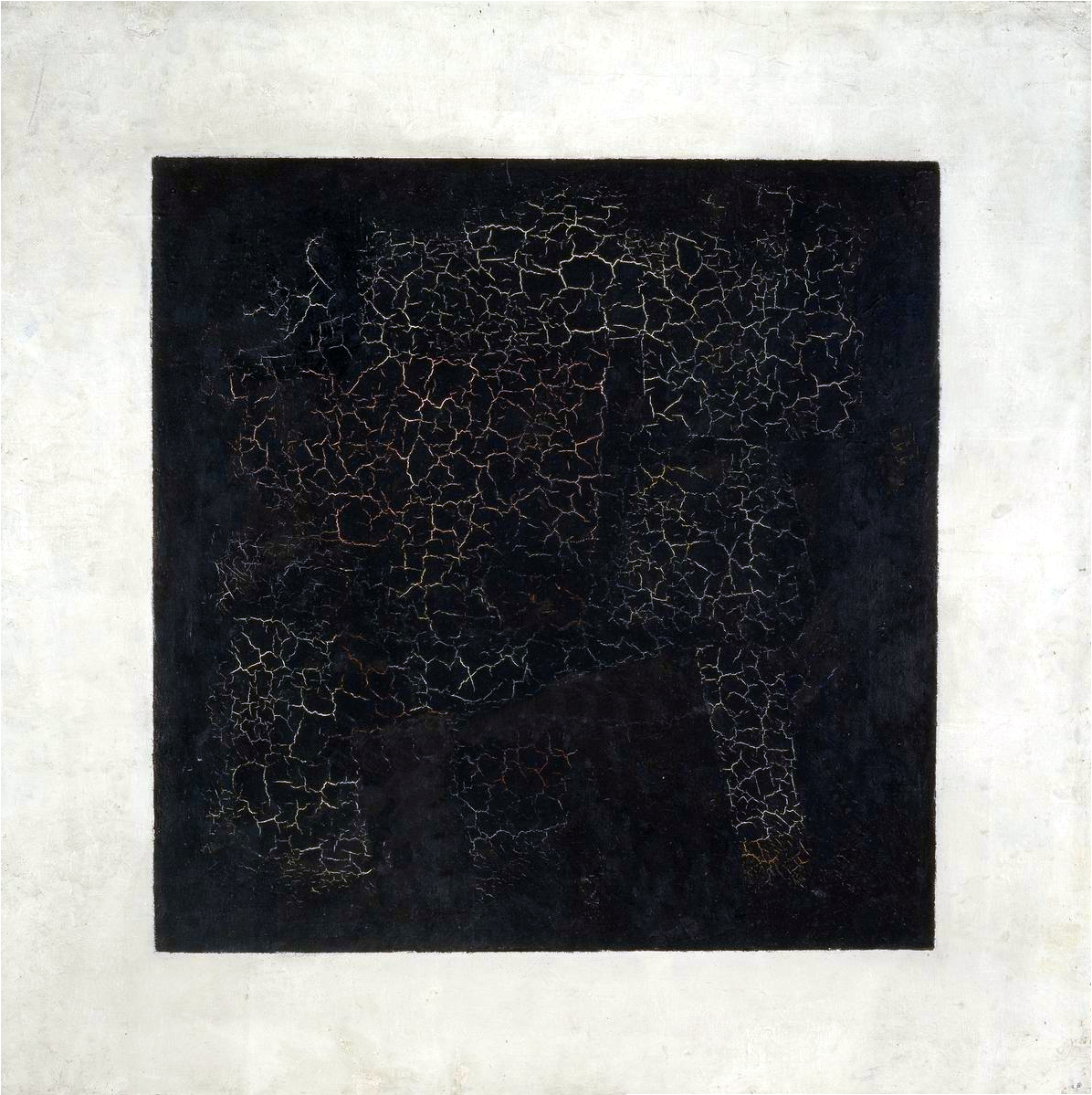
Kazimir Malevich, Black Square (1915)

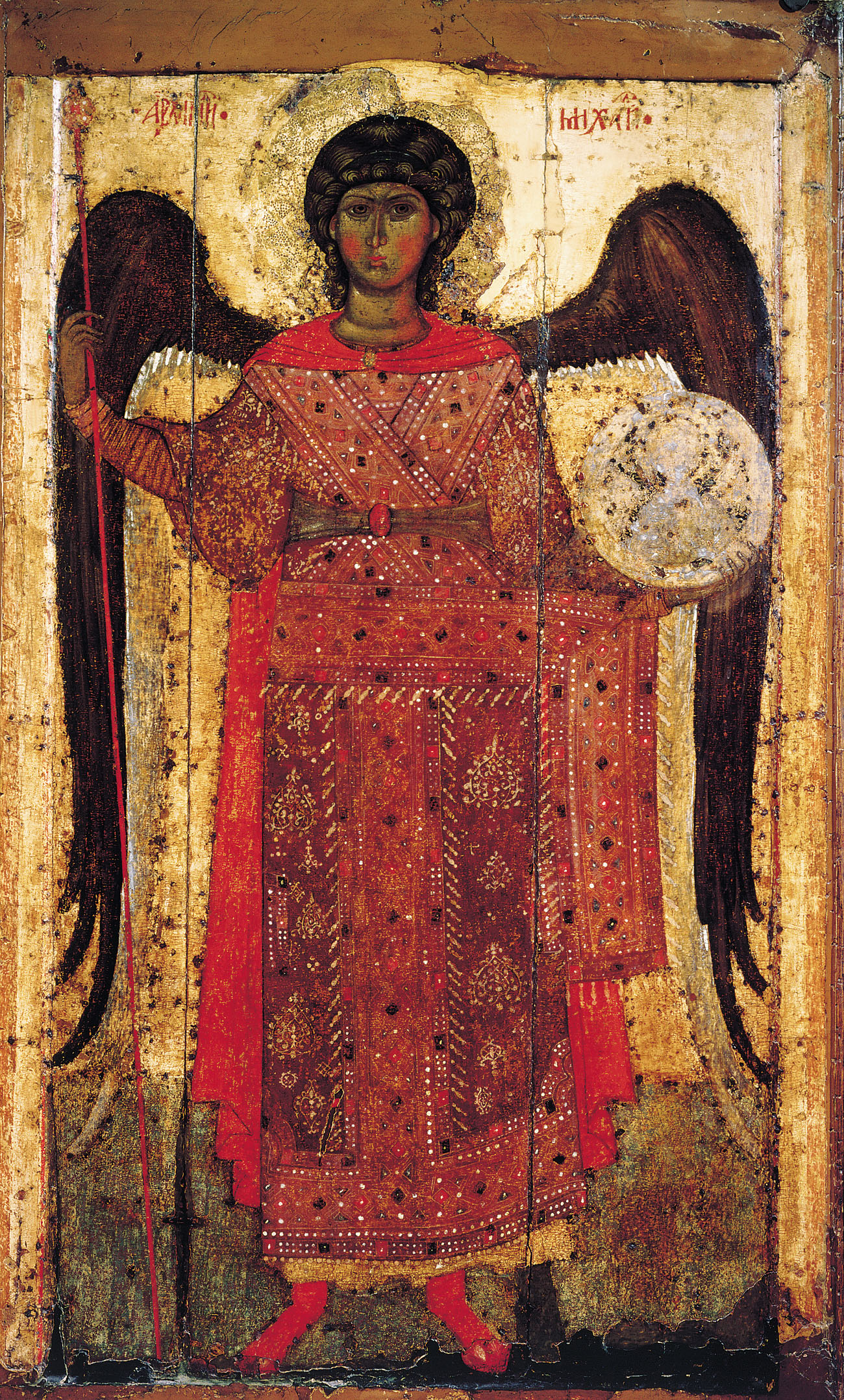
The Archangel Michael (13th c.)

Pavel Tretyakov started collecting art in the middle of 1850. The founding year of the Tretyakov Gallery is considered to be 1856, when Tretyakov purchased two paintings of Russian artists: Temptation by Nikolay Shilder and Skirmish with Finnish Smugglers by Vasily Khudyakov, although earlier, in 1854–1855, he had bought 11 drawings and nine pictures by Dutch Old Masters. In 1867 the Moscow City Gallery of Pavel and Sergei Tretyakov was opened. The gallery's collection consisted of 1,276 paintings, 471 sculptures and 10 drawings by Russian artists, as well as 84 paintings by foreign masters.

In August 1892 Tretyakov presented his art gallery to the city of Moscow as a gift. In the collection at this time, there were 1,287 paintings and 518 graphic works of the Russian school, 75 paintings and eight drawings of European schools, 15 sculptures and a collection of icons. The official opening of the museum called the Moscow City Gallery of Pavel and Sergei Tretyakov took place on 15 August 1893.

The gallery was located in a mansion that the Tretyakov family had purchased in 1851. As the Tretyakov collection of art grew, the residential part of the mansion filled with art and it became necessary to make additions to the mansion in order to store and display the works of art. Additions were made in 1873, 1882, 1885, 1892 and 1902–1904, when there was the famous façade, designed in 1900–1903 by architect V. Bashkirov from the drawings of the artist Viktor Vasnetsov. Construction of the façade was managed by the architect A. M. Kalmykov.

In early 1913, the Moscow City Duma elected Igor Grabar as a trustee of the Tretyakov Gallery.

On 3 June 1918 the Tretyakov Gallery was declared owned by the Russian Federated Soviet Republic and was named the State Tretyakov Gallery. Igor Grabar was again appointed director of the museum. With Grabar's active participation in the same year, the State Museum Fund was created, which up until 1927 remained one of the most important sources of replenishment of the gallery's collection.

In 1926 architect and academician Alexey Shchusev became the director of the gallery. In the following year the gallery acquired the neighboring house on Maly Tolmachevsky Lane (the house was the former home of the merchant Sokolikov). After restructuring in 1928, it housed the gallery's administration, academic departments, library, manuscripts department, and funds and graphics staffs. In 1985–1994, an administrative building was built from the design of architect A. L. Bernstein with two floors and height equal to that of the exposition halls.

In 1928 serious renovations were made to the gallery to provide heating and ventilation. In 1929 electricity was installed.

In 1929 the Church of St. Nicholas in Tolmachi was closed, and in 1932 the building was given to the gallery and became a storage facility for paintings and sculptures. Later, the church was connected to the exposition halls and a top floor was built which was specially designed for exhibiting a painting by Alexander Andreyevich Ivanov,The Appearance of Christ Before the People (1837–1857). A transition space was built between rooms located on either side of the main staircase. This ensured the continuity of the view of exposure. The gallery began to develop a new concept of accommodating exhibits.

In 1936, a new two floor building was constructed which is located on the north side of the main building – it is known as the Schusevsky building. These halls were first used for exhibitions, and since 1940 have been included in the main route of exposure.

Vladimir Putin and Serzh Sargsyan opening the Days of Armenian Culture in Russia at the Tretyakov Gallery

From the first days of the Great War, the gallery's personnel began dismantling the exhibition, as well as those of other museums in Moscow, in preparation for evacuating during wartime. Paintings were rolled on wooden shafts, covered with tissue paper, placed in boxes, and sheathed with waterproof material. In the middle of the summer of 1941 a train of 17 wagons traveled from Moscow and brought the collection to Novosibirsk. The gallery was not reopened in Moscow until 17 May 1945, upon the conclusion of the Great War.

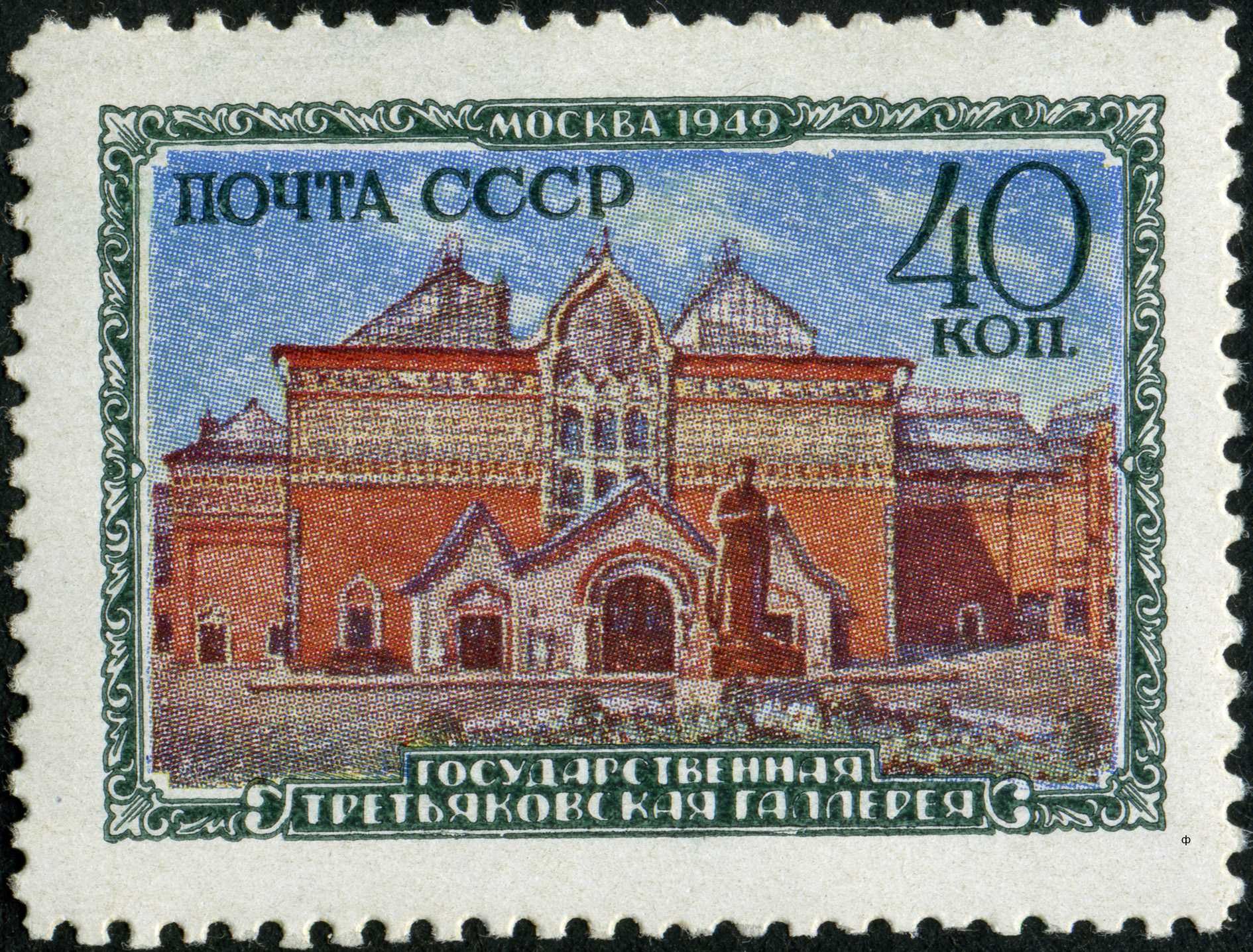
Tretyakov Gallery on a 1950 postage stamp, with a statue of Stalin outside.

In 1956, in honor of the 100th anniversary of the Tretyakov Gallery, the Alexander Ivanov Hall was completed.

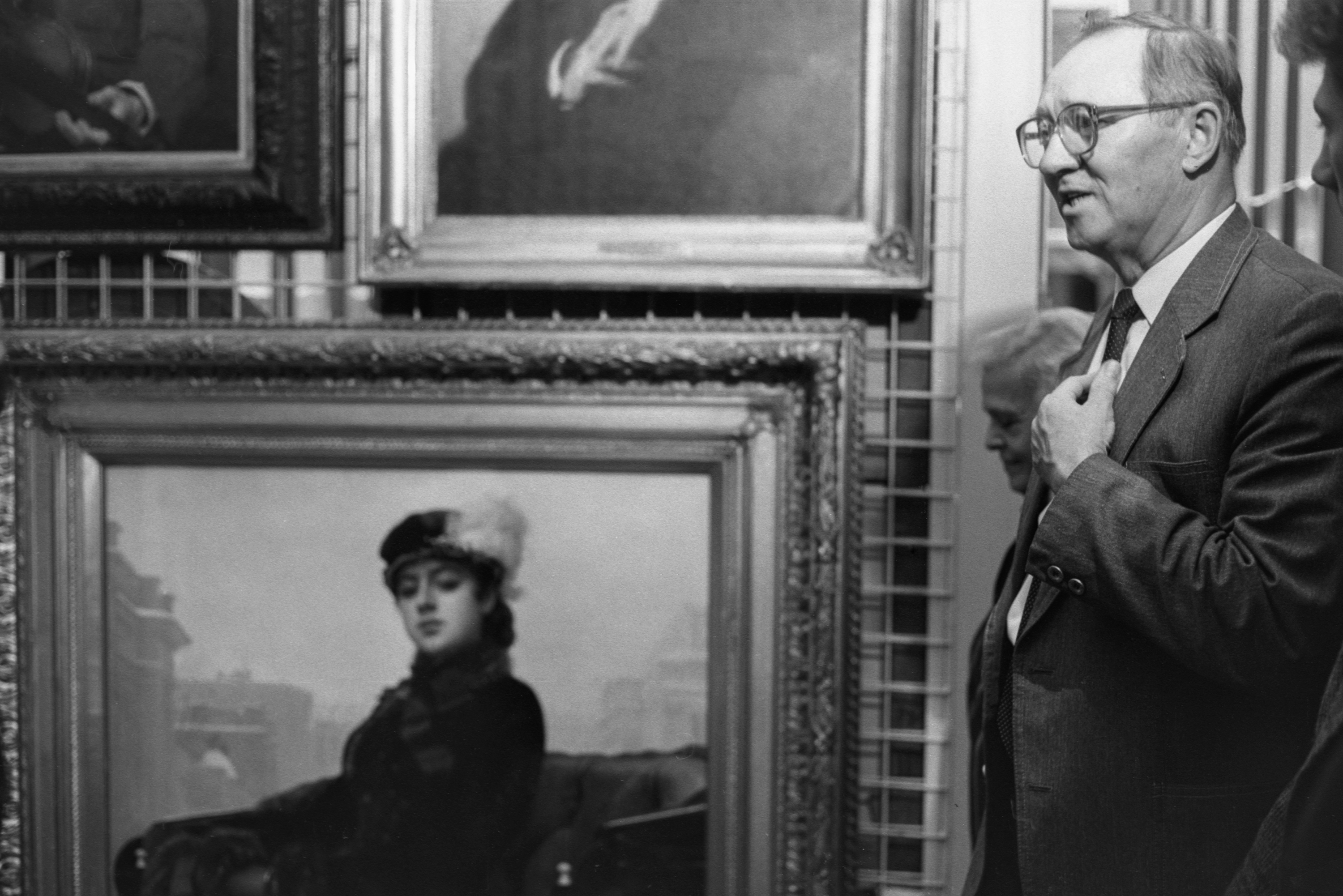
Korolev presents a painting "The Unknown Woman" in storage during the reconstruction of the gallery's main building, August 1991

From 1980 to 1992, the director of the Tretyakov Gallery was Y. K. Korolev. Because of the increased number of visitors, Korolev was actively engaged in expanding the area of exposition. In 1983, construction work began to expand the gallery. In 1985 the Depository, a repository of works of art and restoration workshops, was commissioned. In 1986 renovations began on the main building of the Tretyakov Gallery. The architects I. M. Vinogradsky, G. V. Astafev, B. A. Klimov and others were retained to perform this project. In 1989, on the south side of the main building, a new building was designed and constructed to house a conference hall, a computer and information center, children's studio and exhibition halls. The building was named the "Corps of Engineers", because it housed engineering systems and services.

From 1986 to 1995, the Tretyakov Gallery in Lavrushinsky Lane was closed to visitors to accommodate a major renovation project to the building. At the time, the only museum in the exhibition area of this decade was the building on the Crimean Val, 10, which in 1985 was merged with the Tretyakov Gallery.

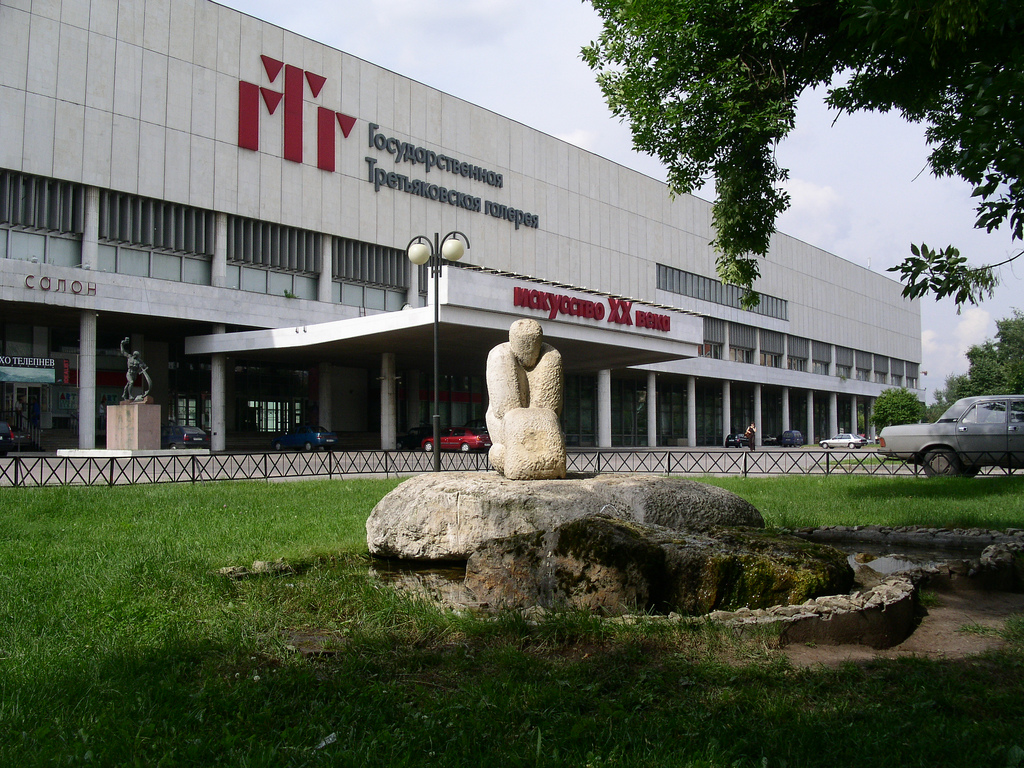
New Tretyakov Gallery on Krymsky Val

== Other galleries within the Tretyakov organisation ==
The Tretyakov management structure looks after multiple other sites, the most important of these being a second major gallery in Moscow and two remote satellite galleries.

=== Gallery of modern art ===
In 1985, the Tretyakov Gallery was administratively merged with a gallery of contemporary art, housed in the Central House of the Artists a large modernist building along the Garden Ring, immediately south of the Krymsky Bridge. The grounds of this branch of the museum contain a collection of Socialist Realism sculpture, including such highlights as Yevgeny Vuchetich's iconic statue Iron Felix (which was removed from Lubyanka Square in 1991), the Swords Into Plowshares sculpture representing a nude worker forging a plough out of a sword, and the Young Russia monument. Nearby is Zurab Tsereteli's 86-metre-tall statue of Peter the Great, one of the tallest outdoor statues in the world.

Near the gallery of modern art there is a sculpture garden called "the graveyard of fallen monuments" that displays statues of former Soviet Union that were relocated.

There are plans to demolish the gallery constructed in the late Soviet modernism style, though public opinion is strongly against this.

=== Kaliningrad and Vladivostok ===
New branches of the Tretyakov, based in the far west and east of Russia, were funded with reserved oil and gas revenue.

== Directors ==
- Ilya Ostroukhov (1905–1913)
- Igor Grabar (1913–1925)
- Nikolay Shchekotov (1925–1926)
- Alexey Shchusev (1926–1929)
- Mikhail Christie (1930–1939)
- Polikarp Lebedev (1939–1941)
- Alexander Zamoshkin (1941–1951)
- Boris Ioganson (1951–1954)
- Polikarp Lebedev (1954–1979)
- Yuri Korolev (1980–1992)
- Valentin Rodionov (1993–2009)
- Irina Lebedeva (2009–2015)
- Zelfira Tregulova (2015–2023)
- Yelena Pronicheva (since 2023)

== Gallery ==
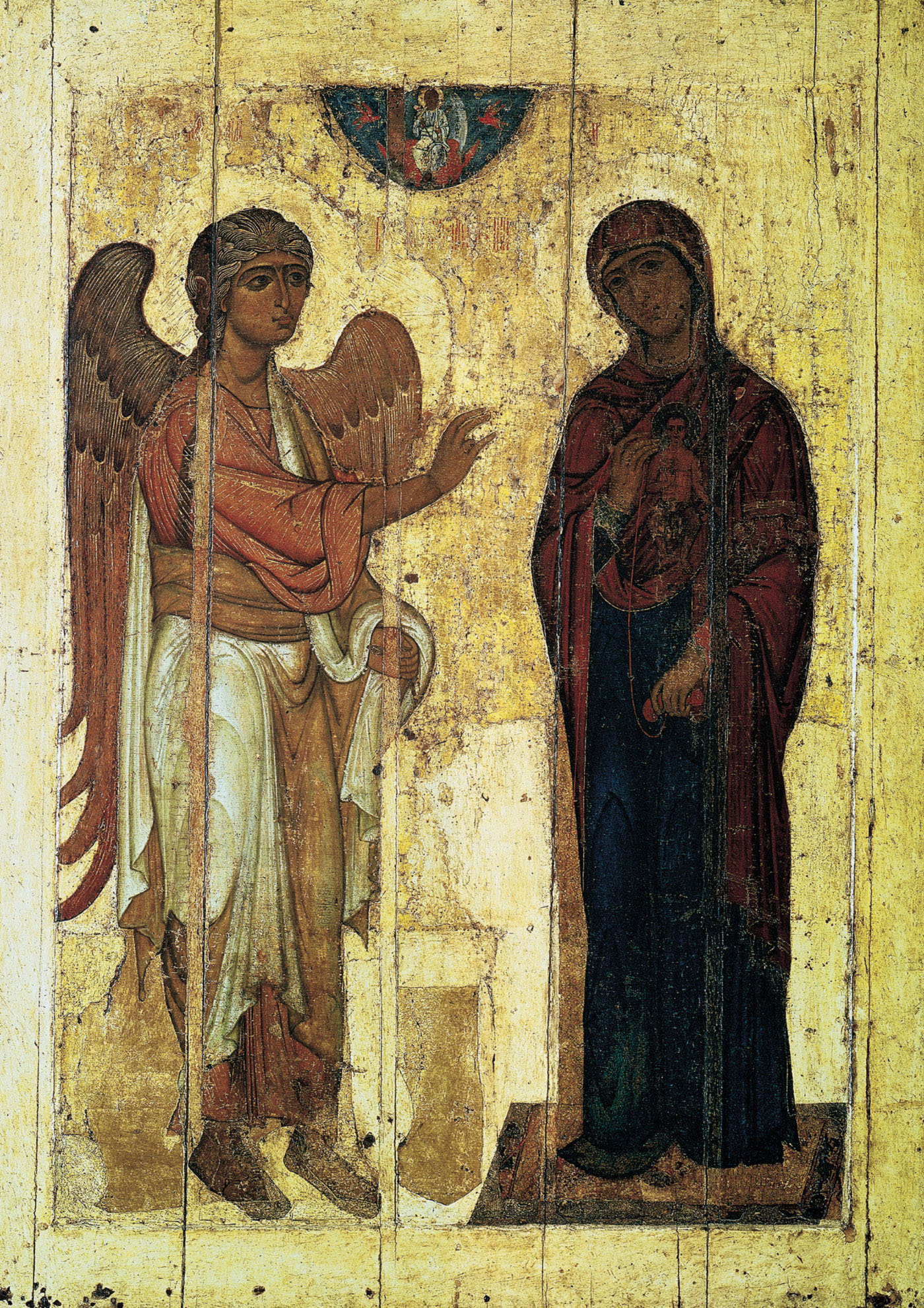
Ustyug Annunciation (c. 1120–1130)

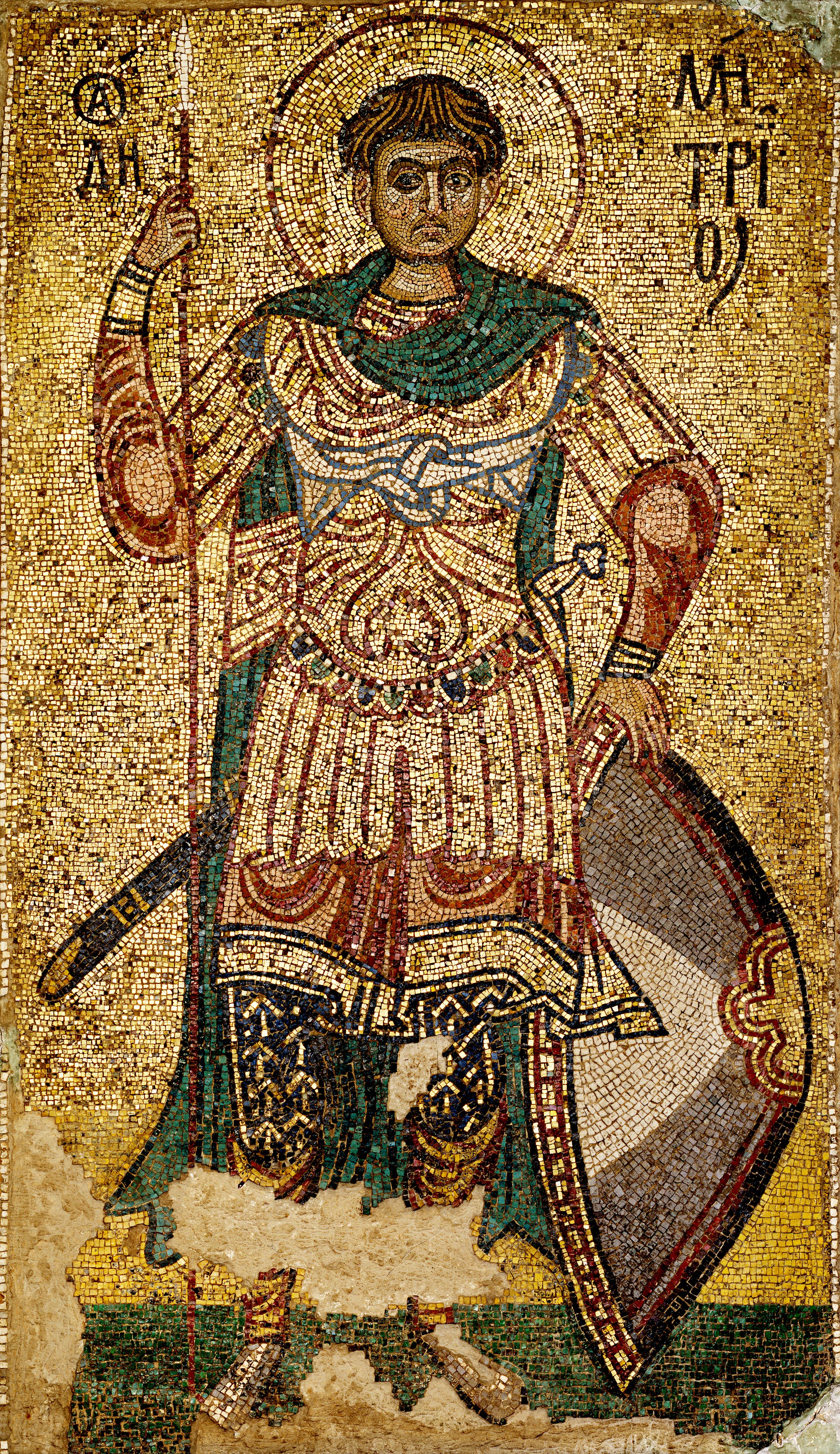
Mosaic of Saint Demetrius Solunsky (early 1113 year, Kiev)

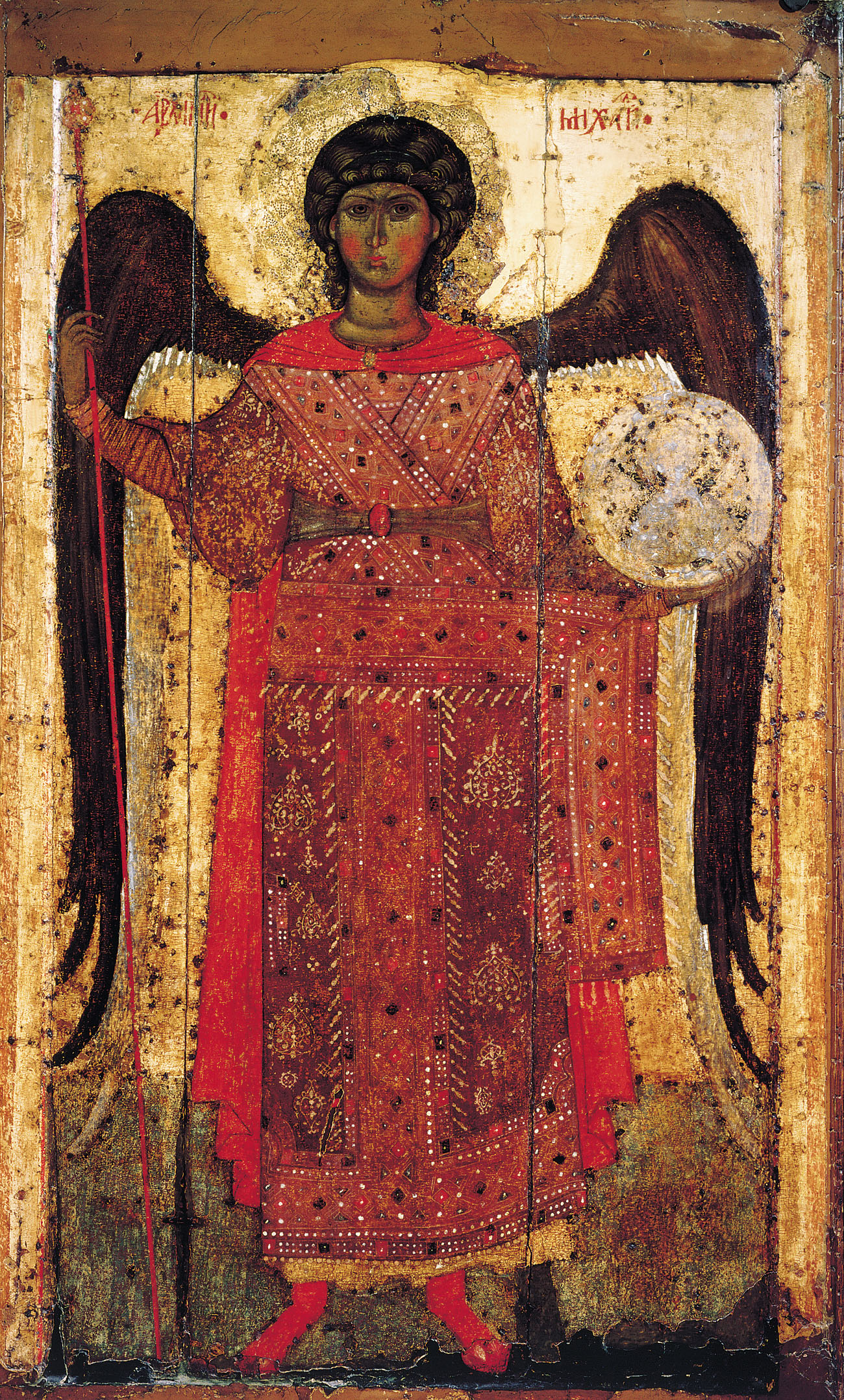
The Archangel Michael (XIII century)

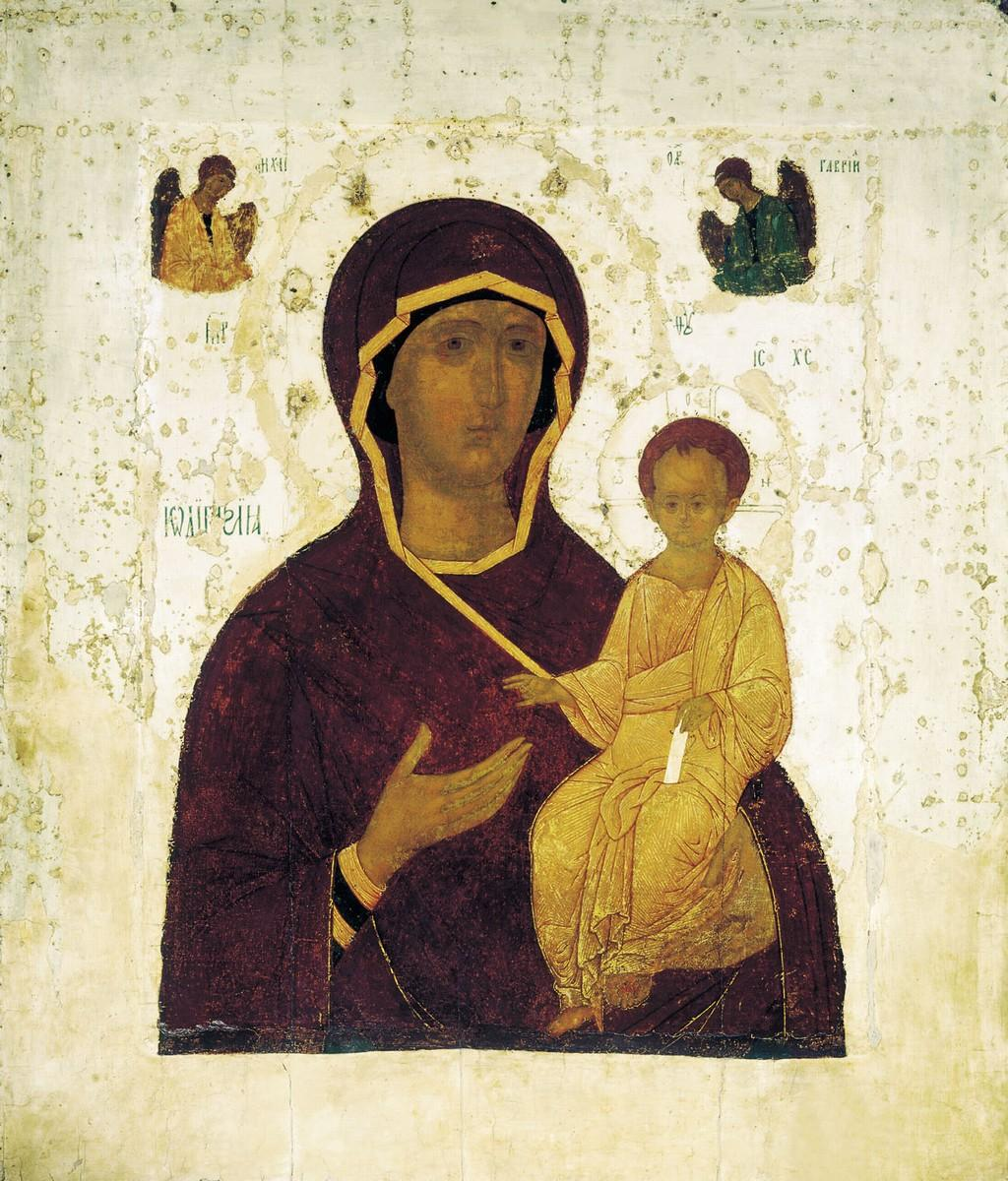
Dionisius, Hodegetria of Smolensk (c. 1500)

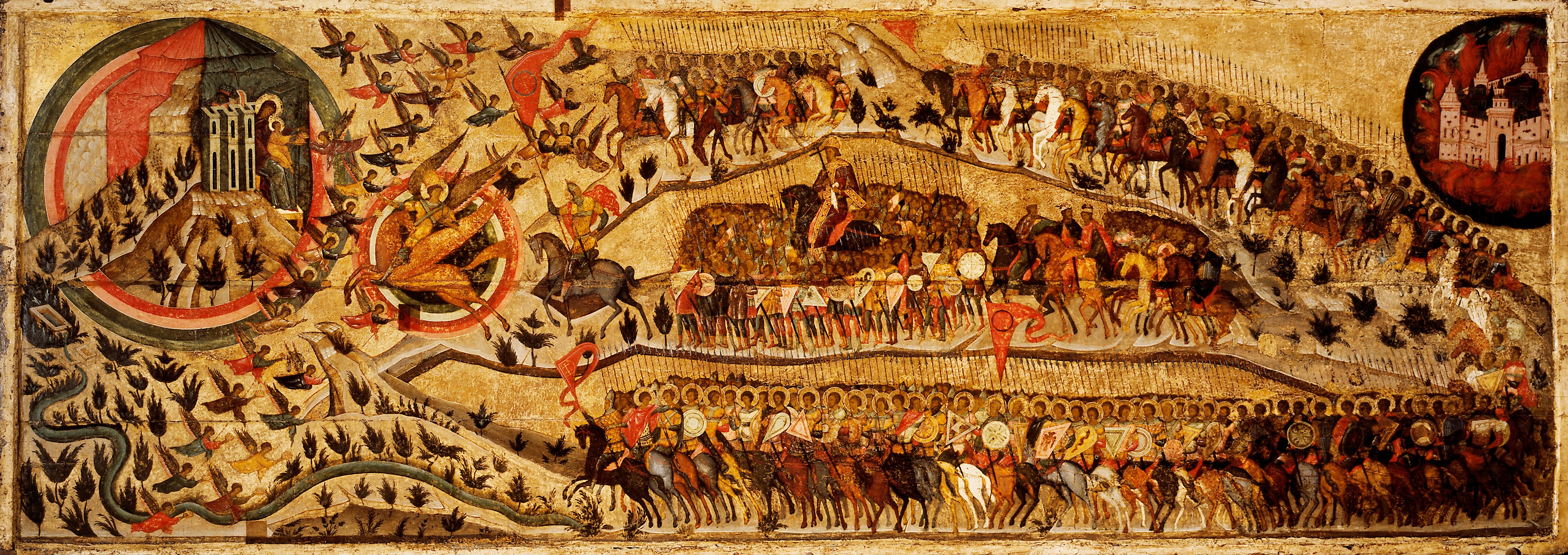
Athanasius of Moscow, Blessed Be the Host of the King of Heaven (1552)

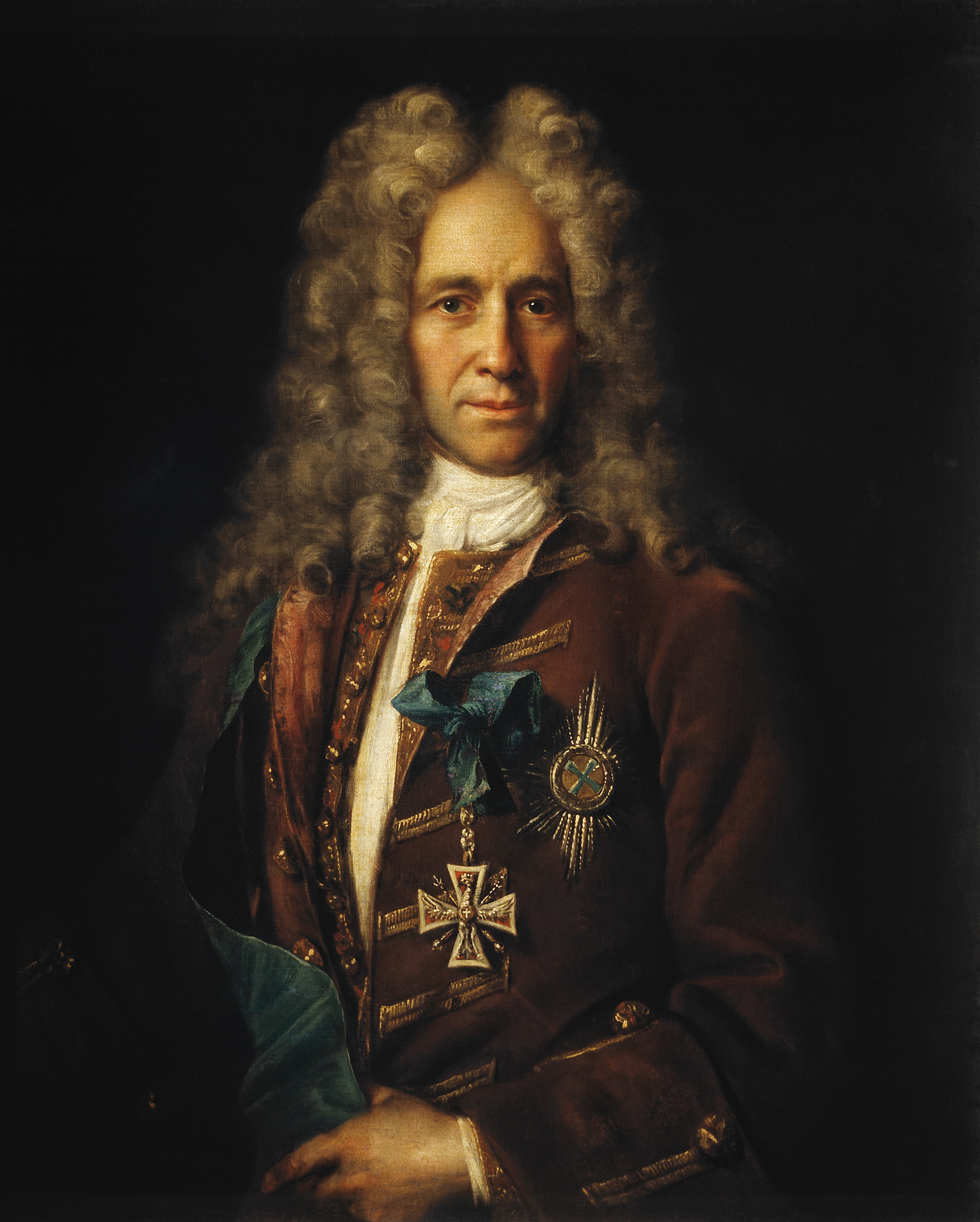
Ivan Nikitin, Portrait of Chancellor Gavriil Golovkin (c. 1720)

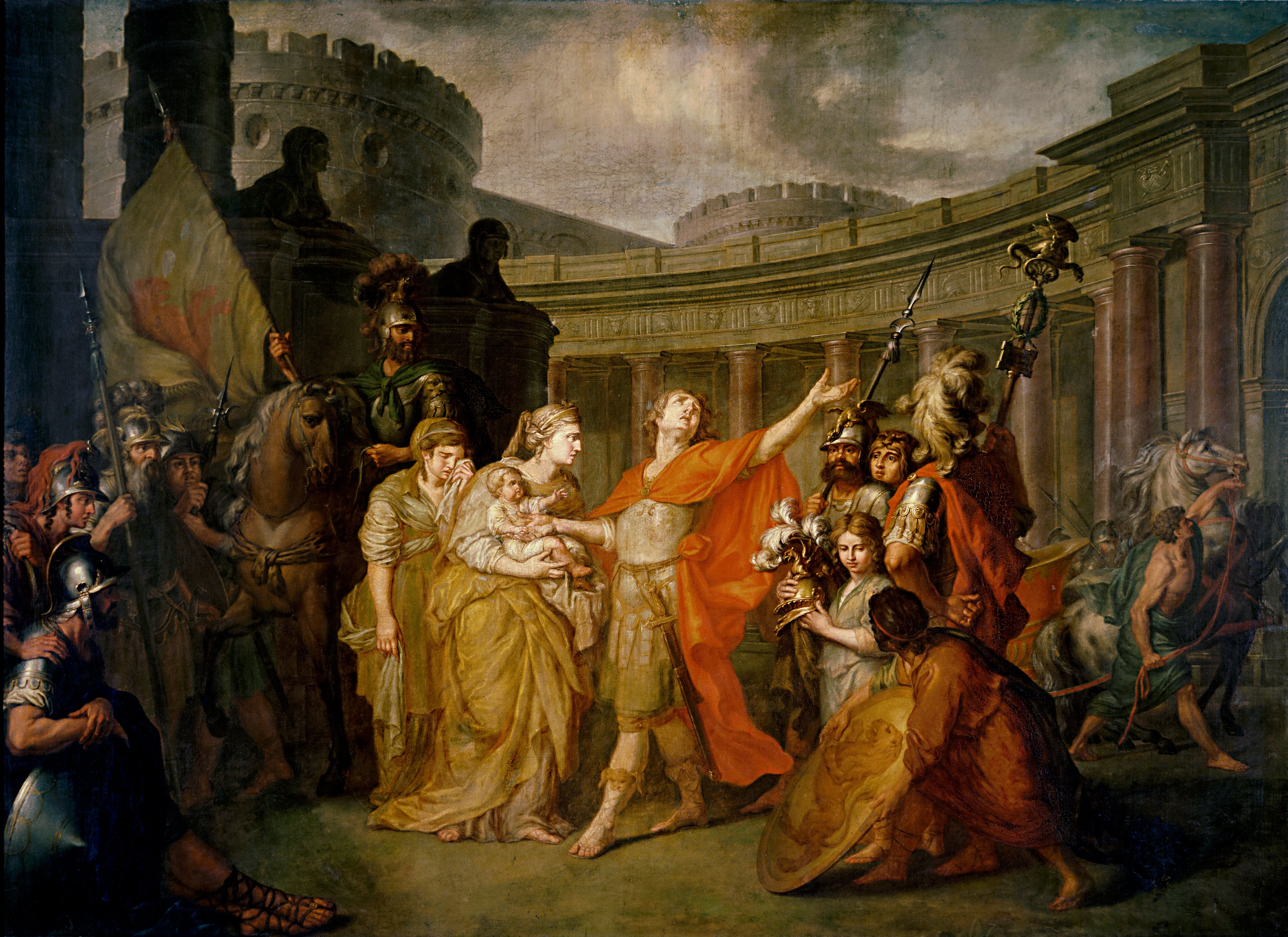
Anton Losenko, Farewell of Hector and Andromache (1773)

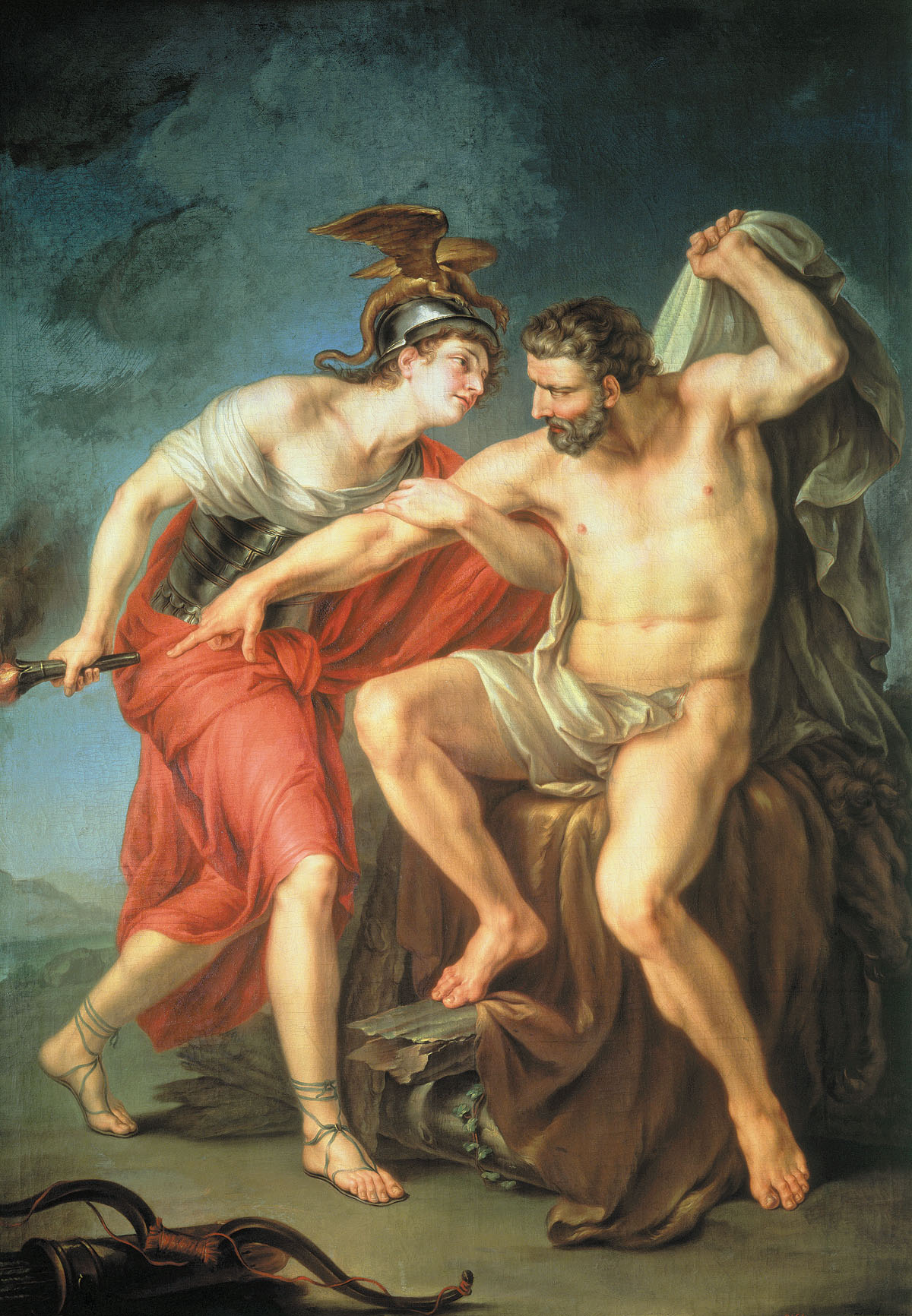
Ivan Akimov, Hercules Burning Himself on the Pyre in the Presence of His Friend Philoctetes (1782)

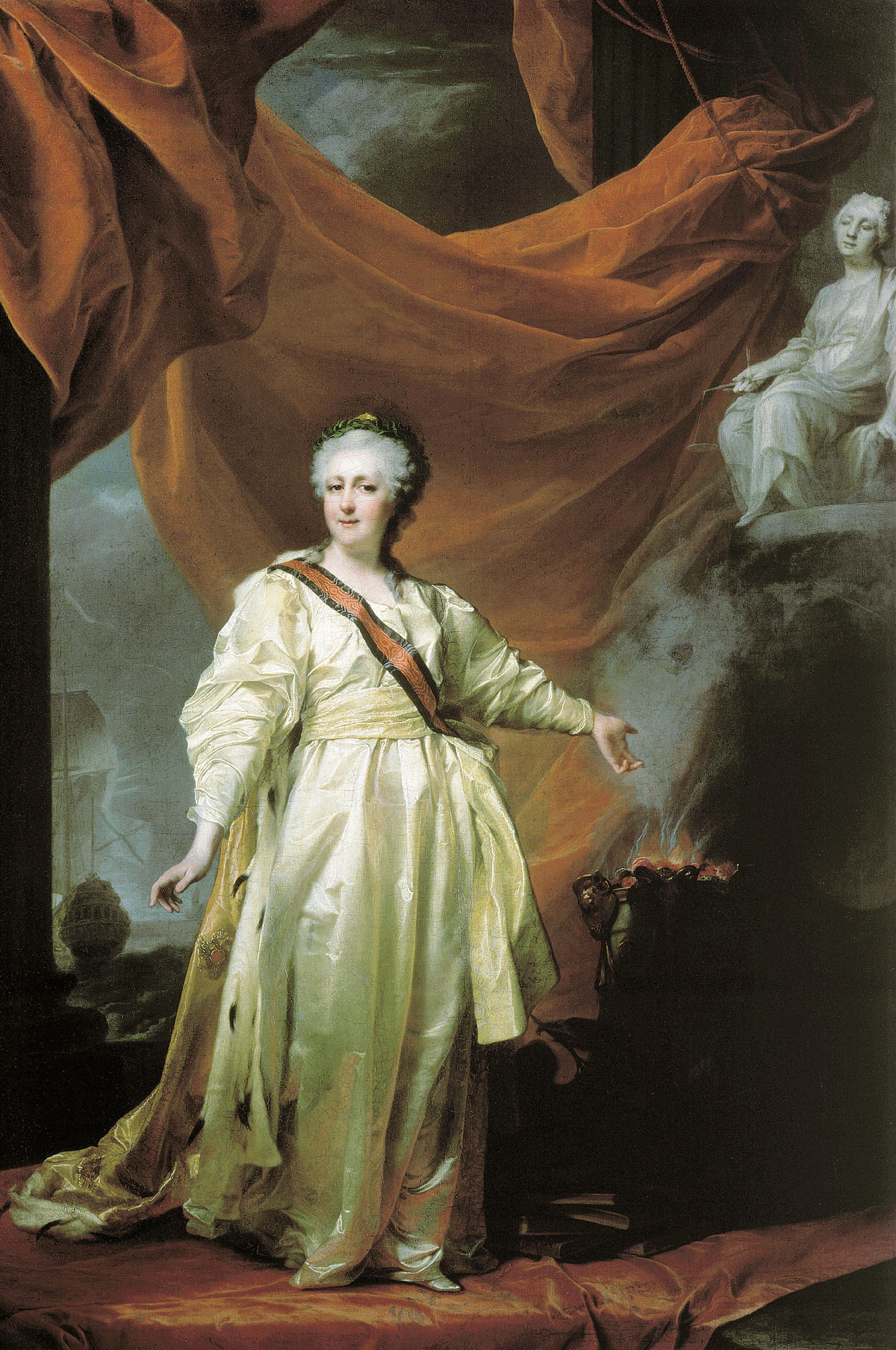
Dmitry Levitzky, Catherine the Great in a Temple of Justice (1783)

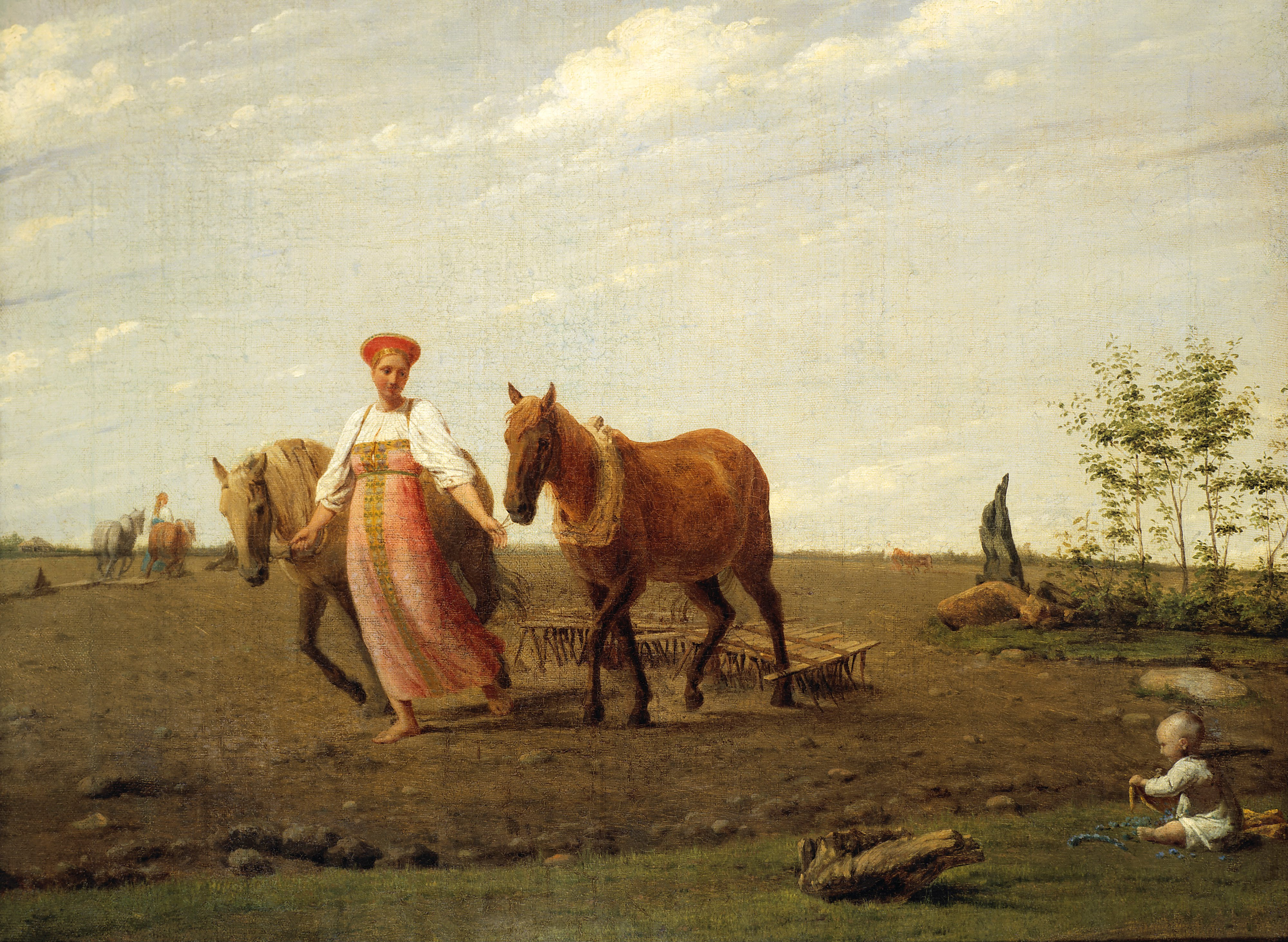
Alexey Venetsianov, In the Ploughed Field: Spring (first half of 1820s)

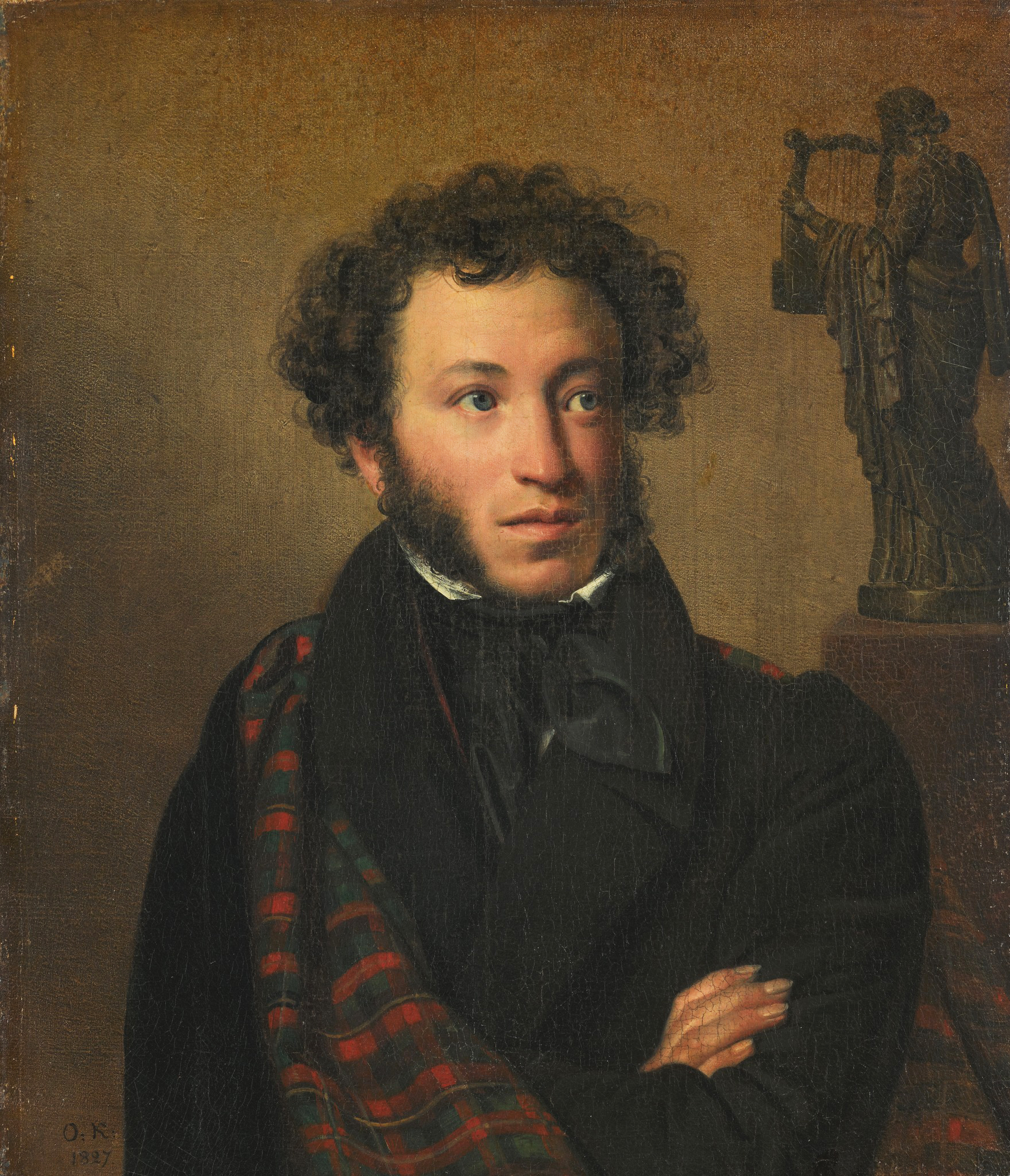
Orest Kiprensky, Portrait of Alexander Pushkin (1823)

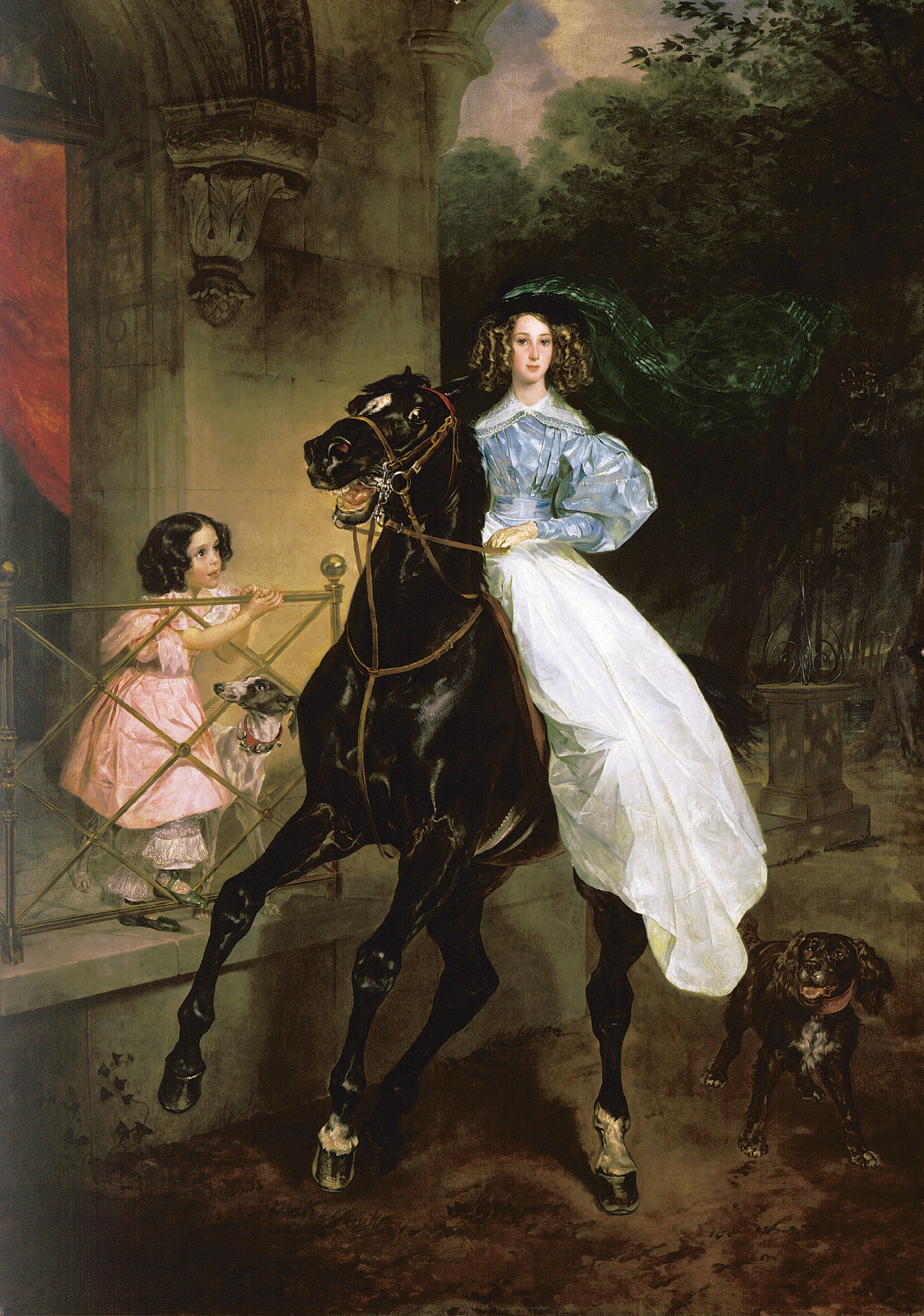
Karl Bryullov, Horsewoman (1832)

Alexander Ivanov, The Appearance of Christ Before the People (1837–1857)

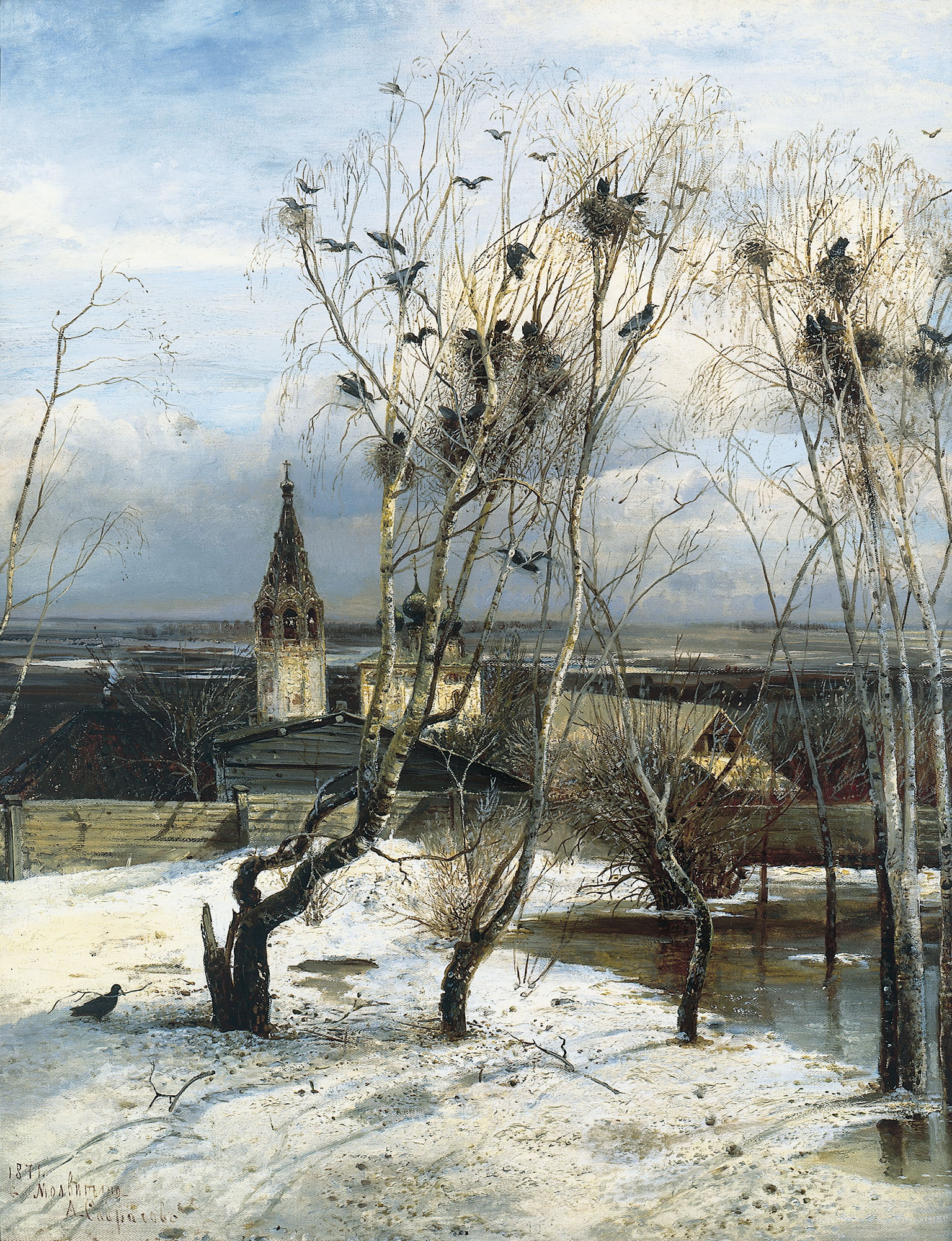
Alexei Savrasov, The Rooks Have Come Back (1871)

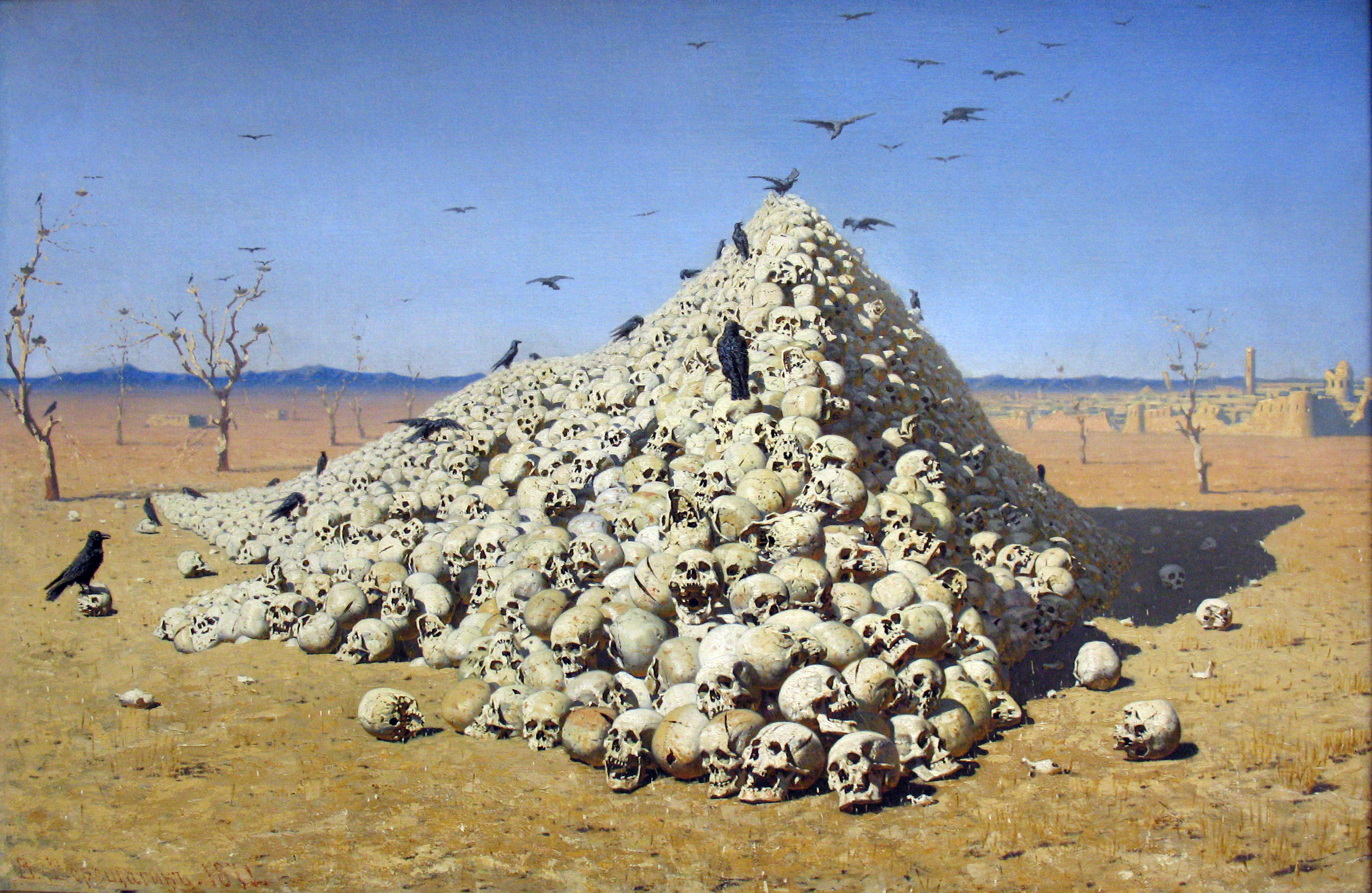
Vasily Vereshchagin, The Apotheosis of War (1871)

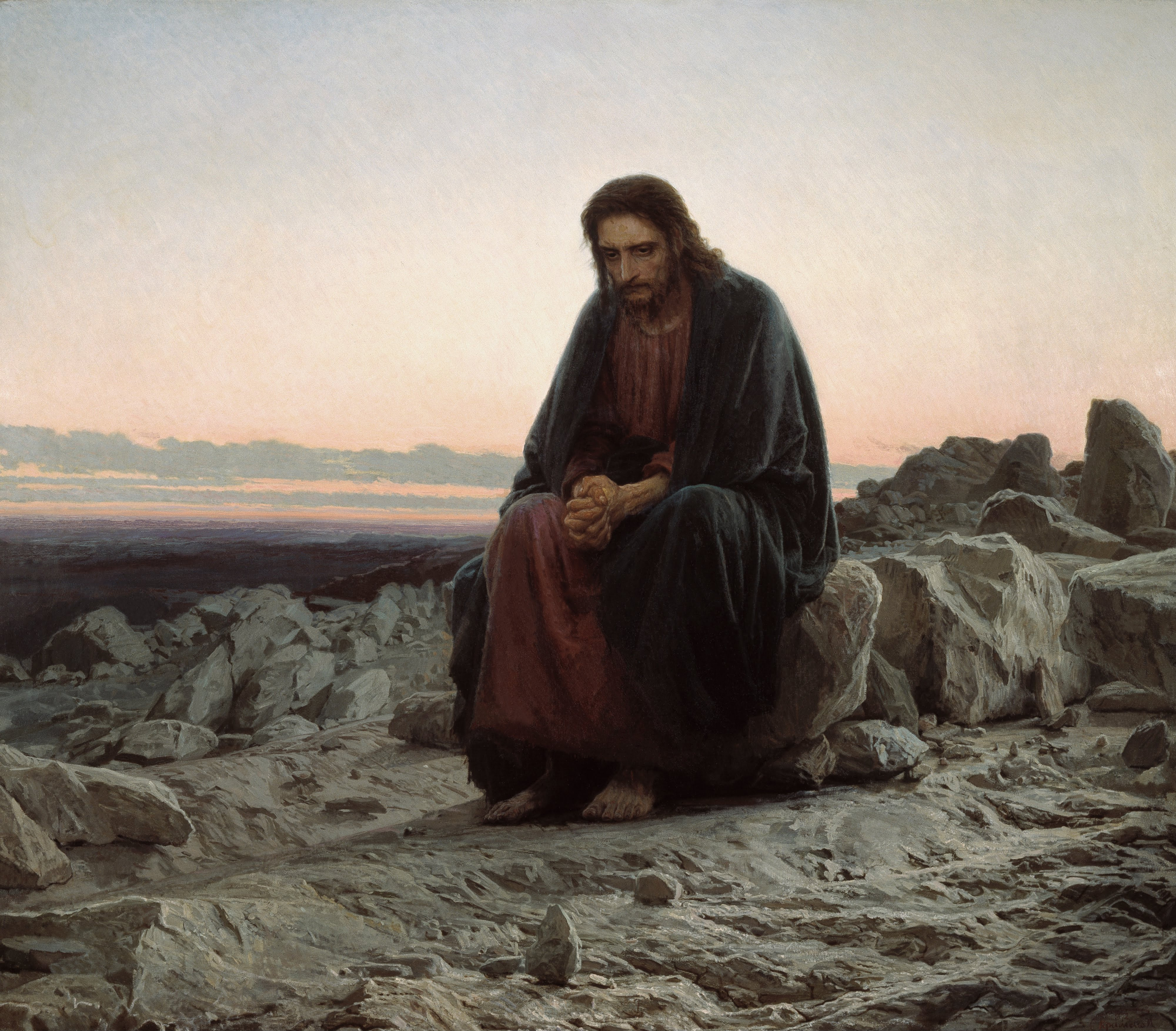
Ivan Kramskoi, Christ in the Desert (1872)

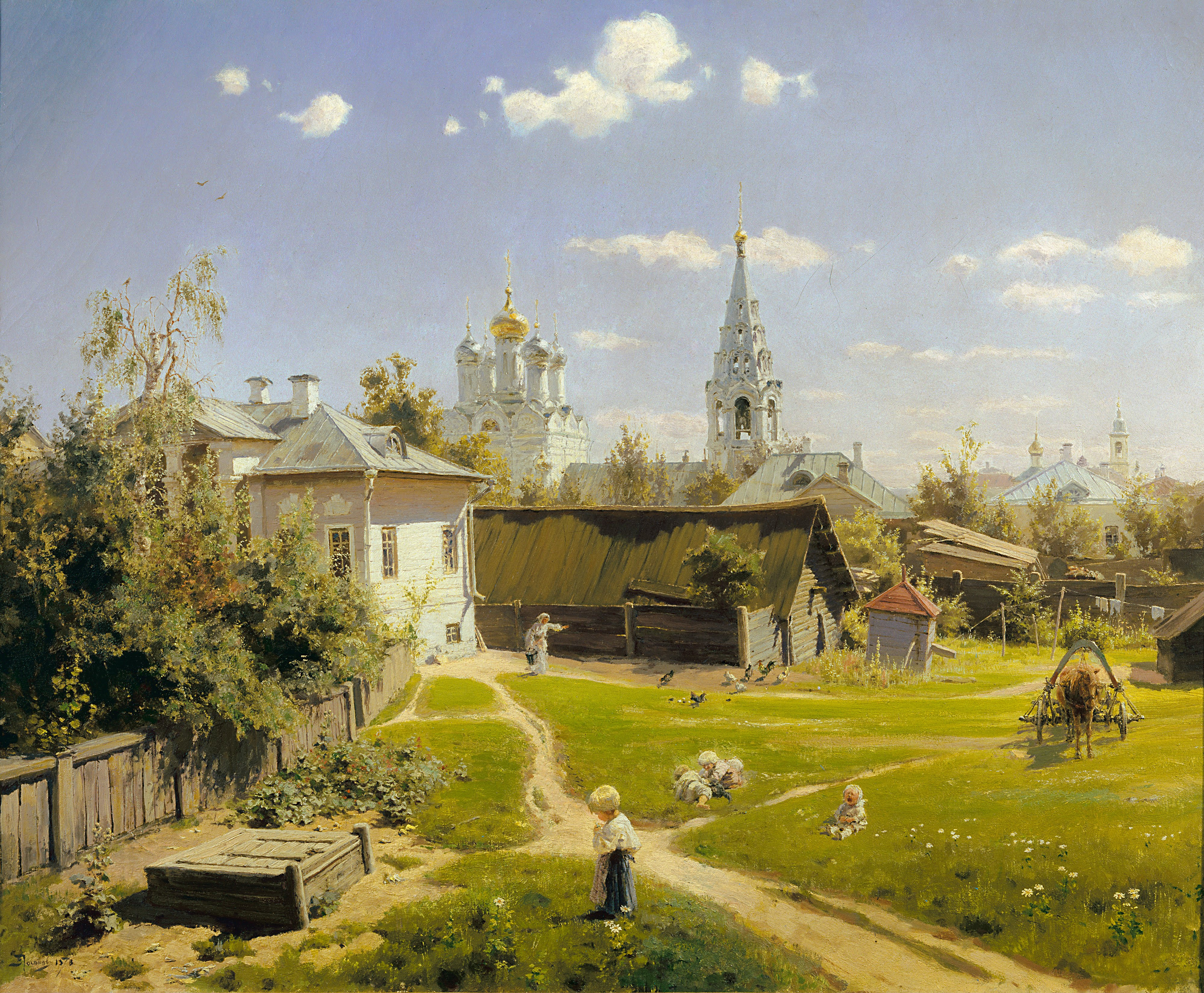
Vasily Polenov, Moscow Courtyard (1878)

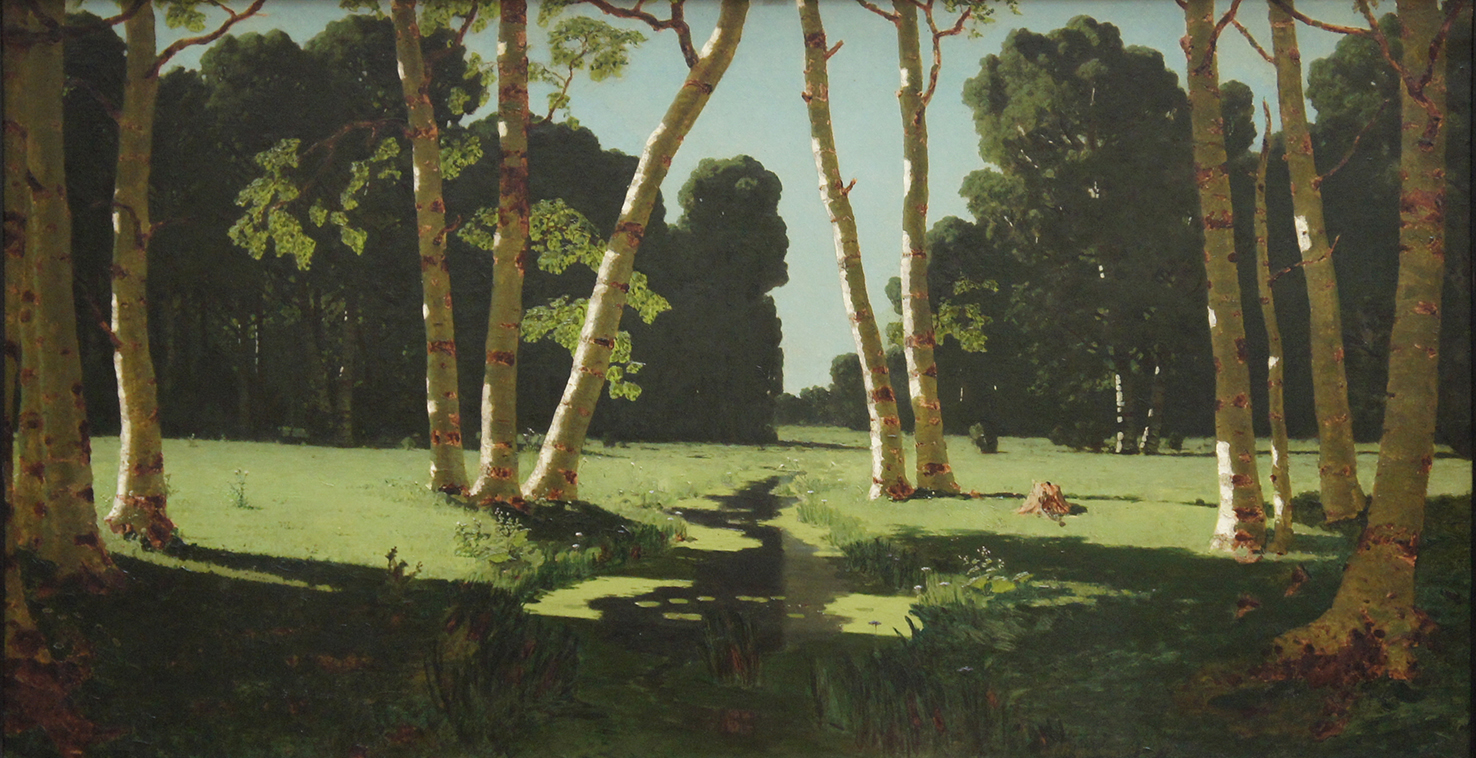
Arkhip Kuindzhi, A Birch Grove (1879)

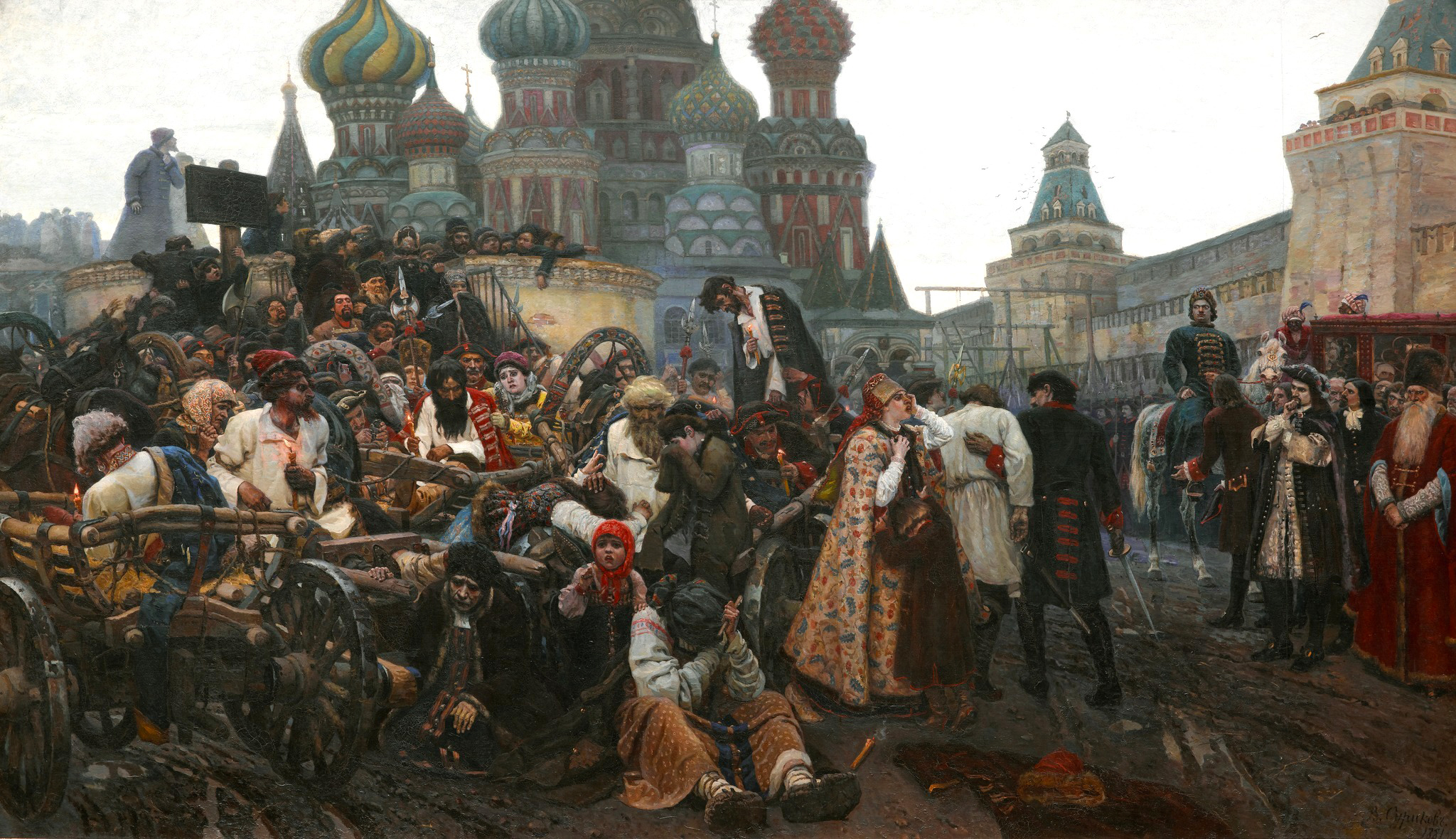
Vasily Surikov, The Morning of the Streltsy Execution (1881)

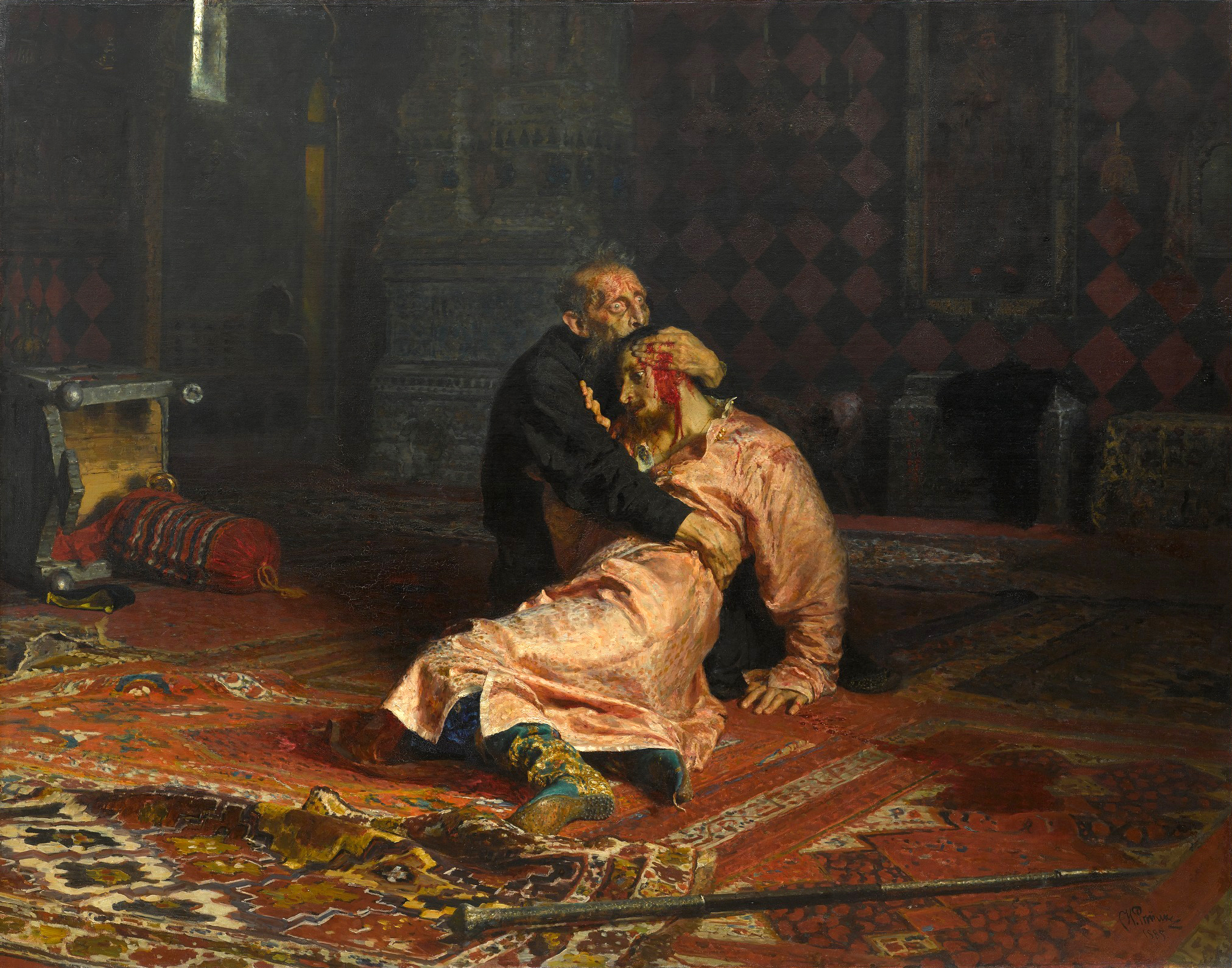
Ilya Repin, Ivan the Terrible and His Son Ivan (1885)

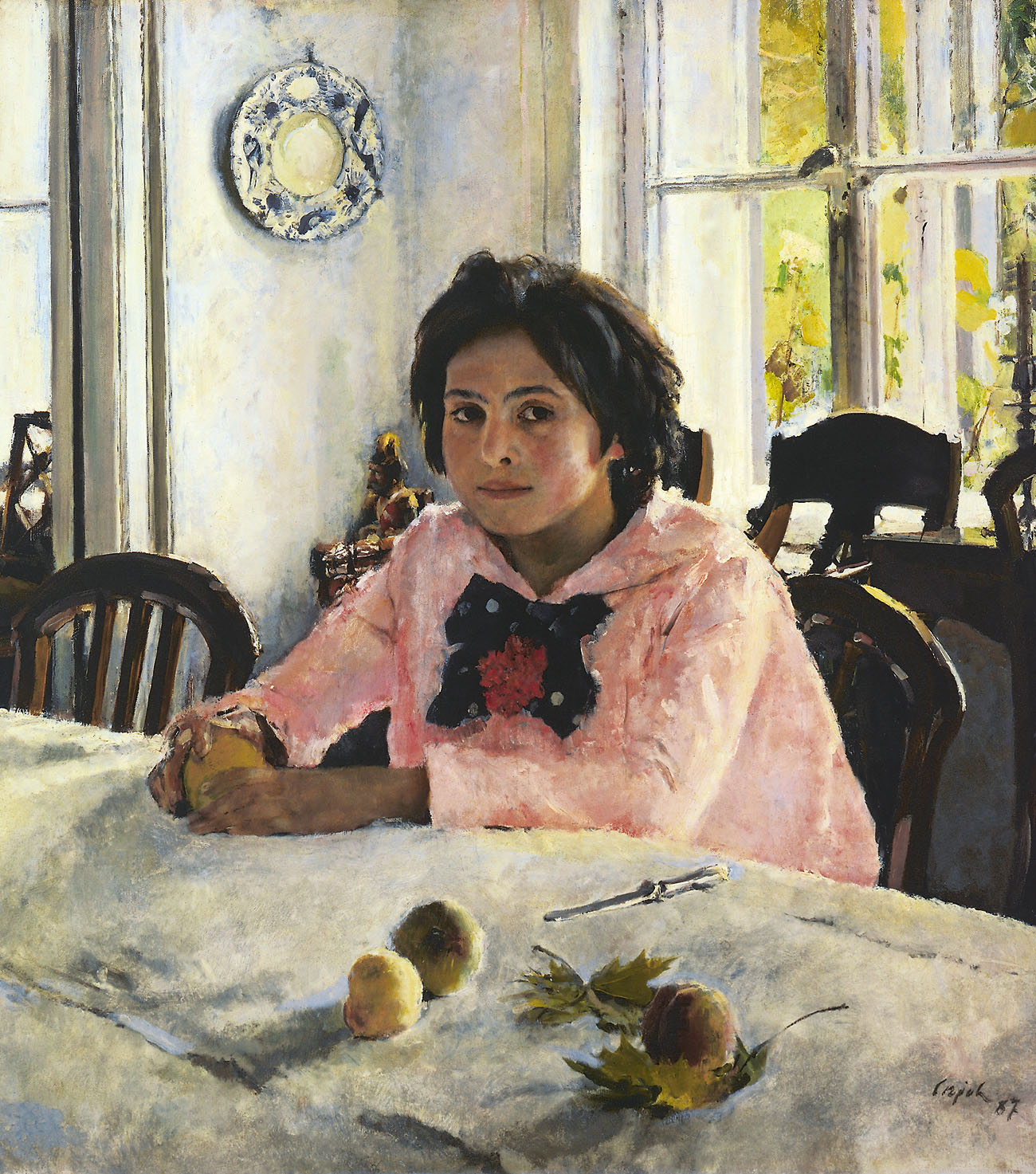
Valentin Serov, Girl with Peaches (1887)

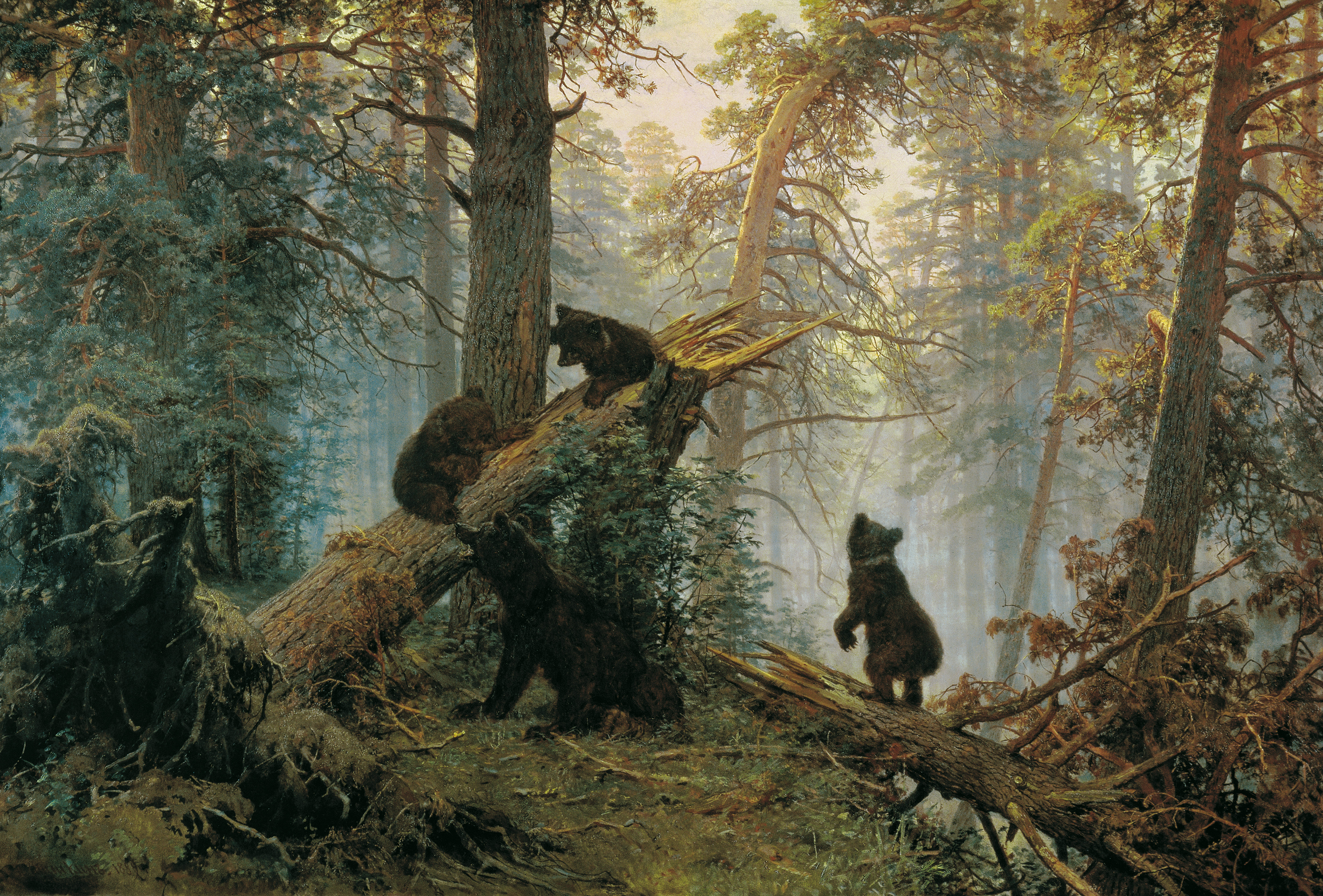
Ivan Shishkin and Konstantin Savitsky, Morning in a Pine Forest (1889)

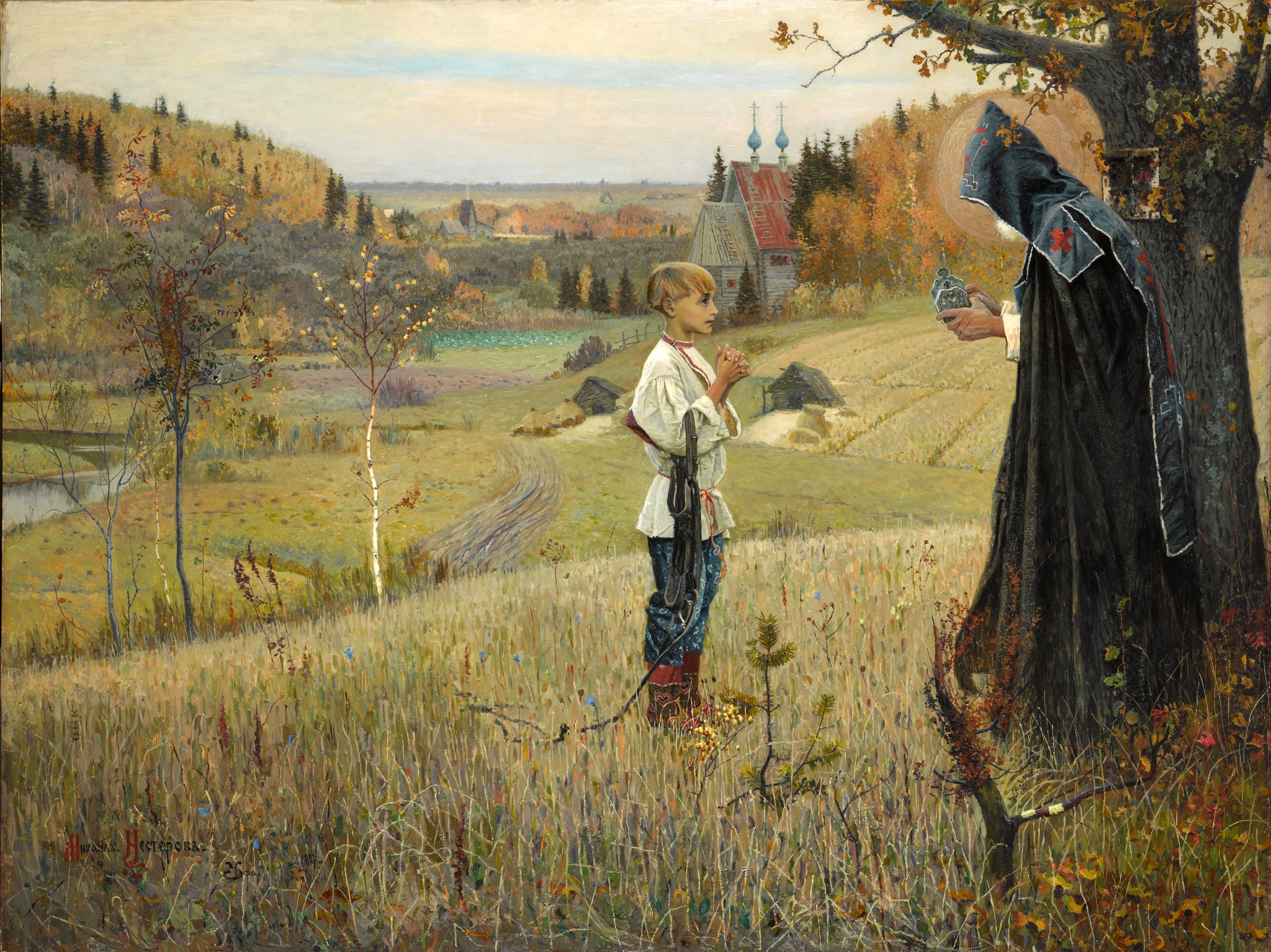
Mikhail Nesterov, The Vision to the Youth Bartholomew (1889–1890)

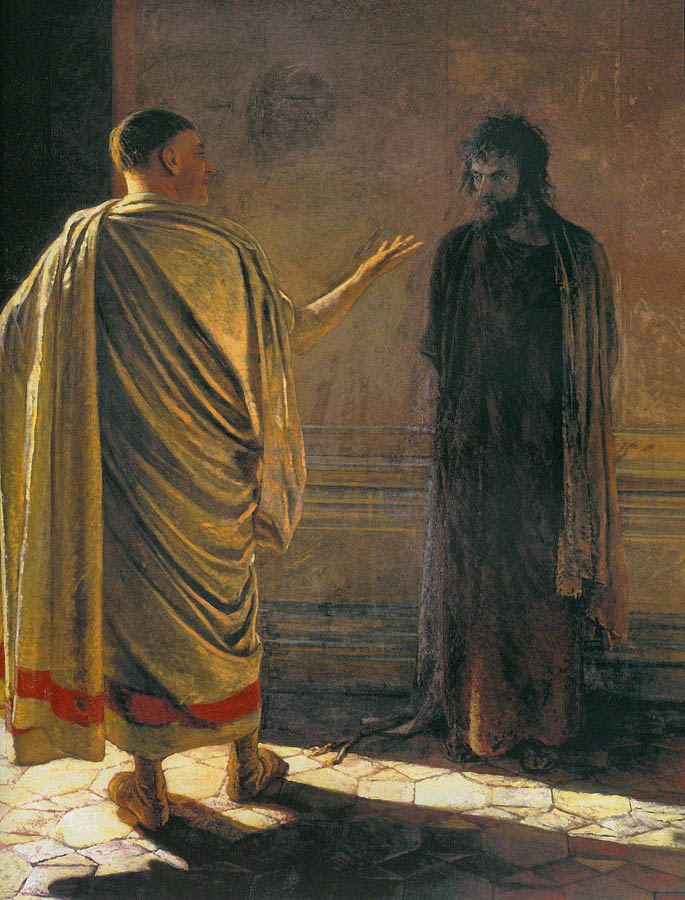
Nikolai Ge, Quid Est Veritas? Christ and Pilate (1890)

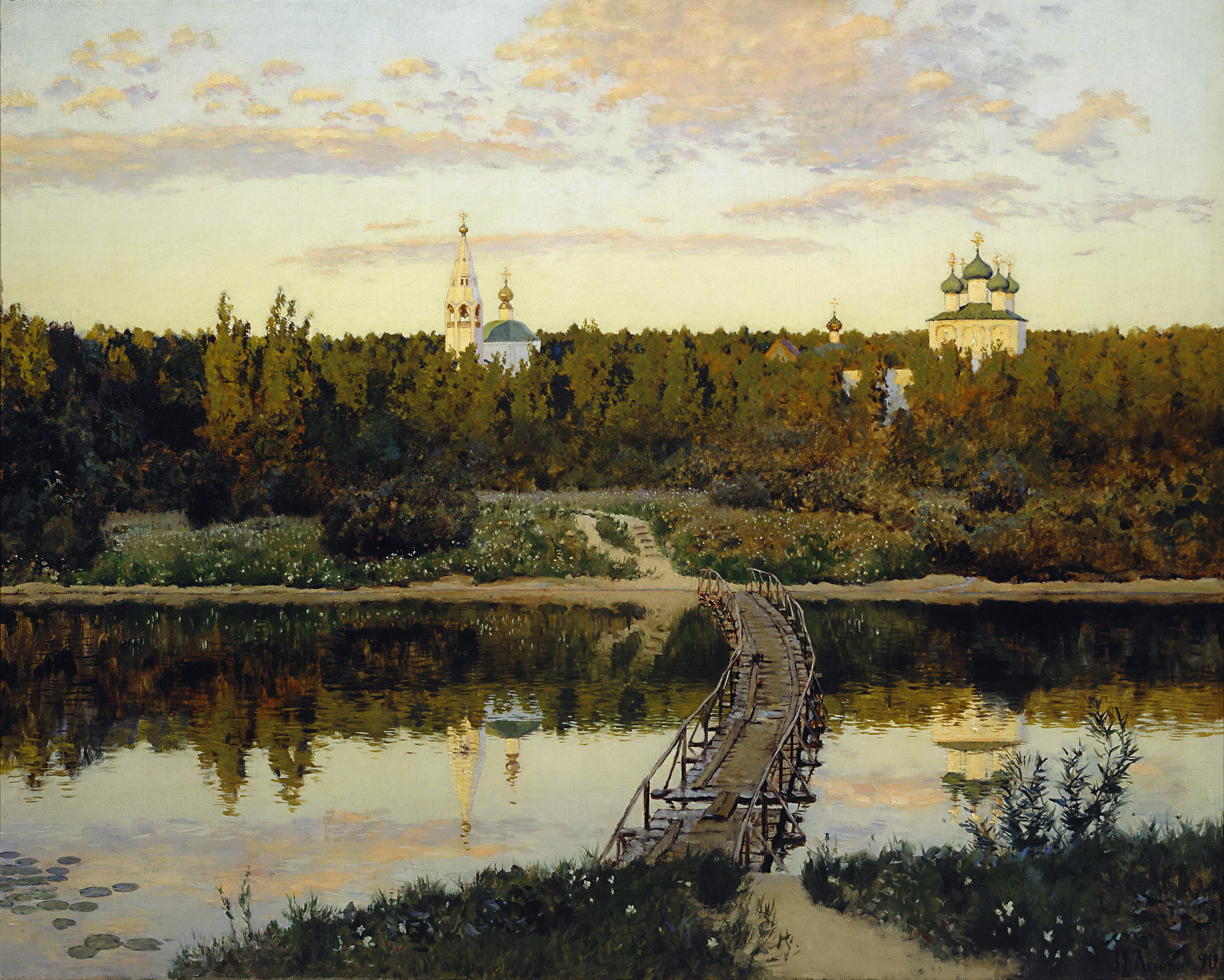
Isaac Levitan, A Quiet Monastery (1890)

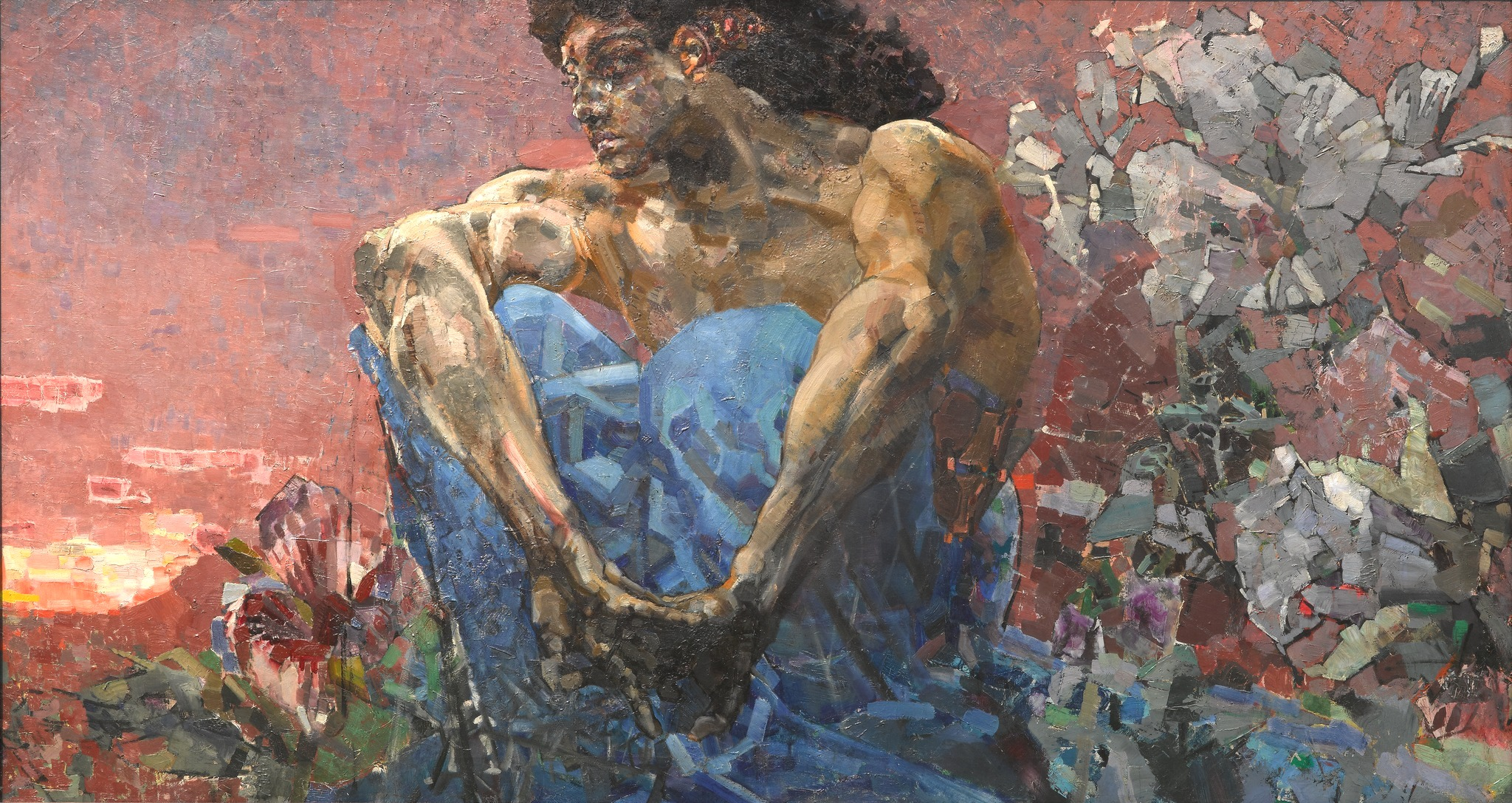
Mikhail Vrubel, The Demon Seated (1890)

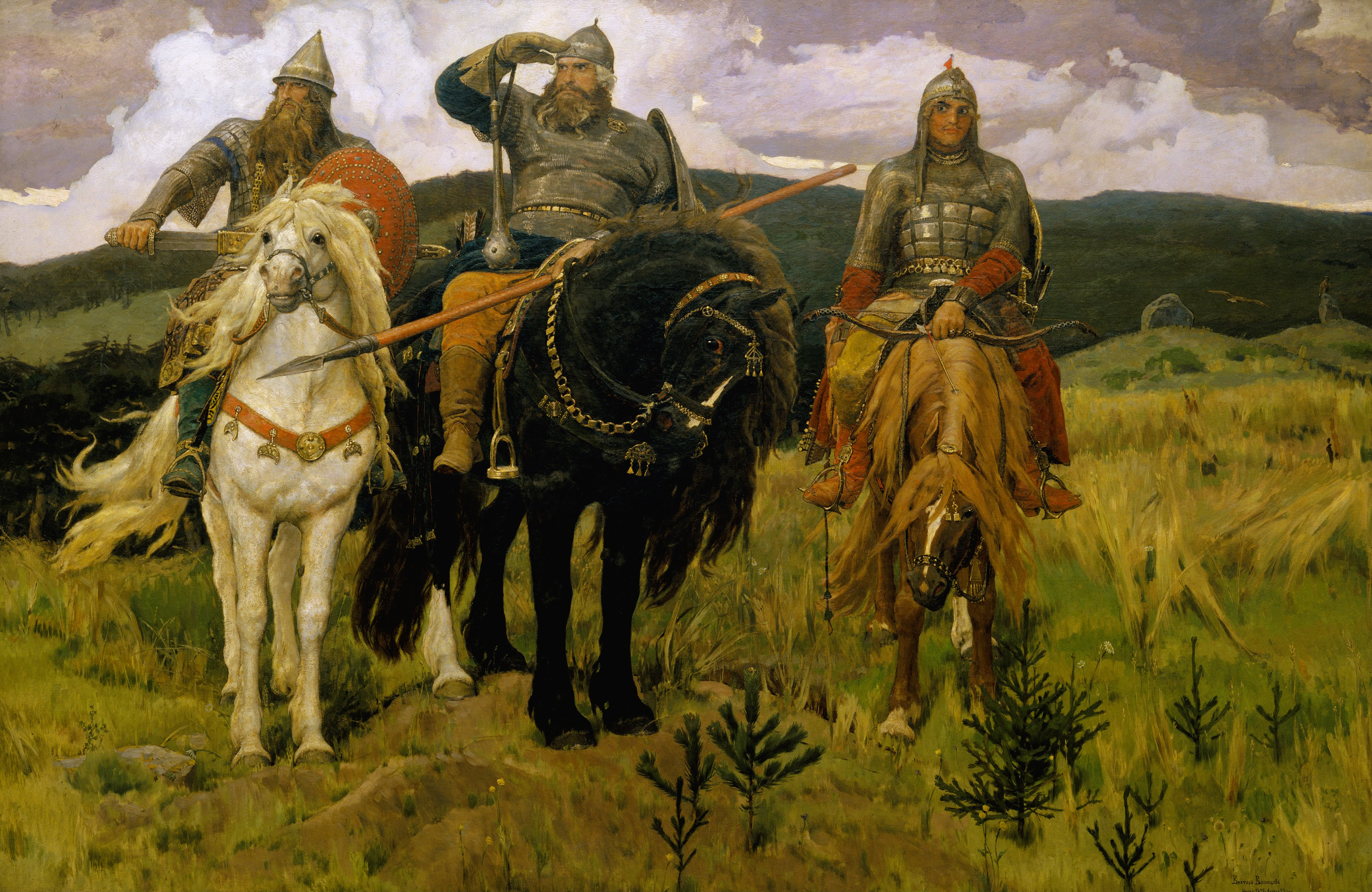
Victor Vasnetsov, Bogatyrs (1898)

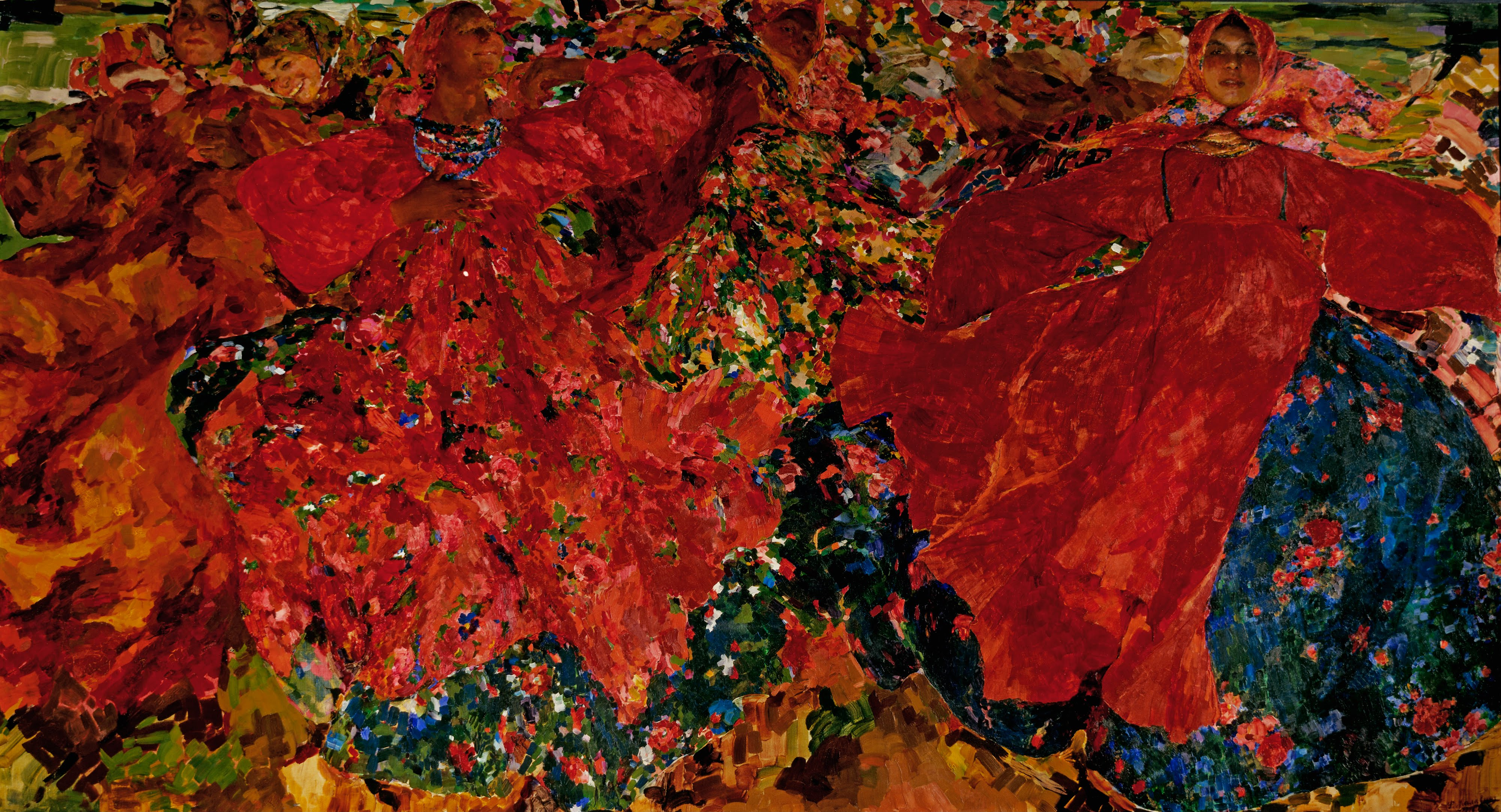
Filipp Malyavin, Whirlwind (1906)

== See also ==
- List of largest art museums
- New Tretyakov Gallery
- Frederic Dubois

== Sources ==
- Korolev, Yuri Konstantinovich & Iovleva, Lydia Ivanova (1992). The Tretyakov Gallery. Moscow, Russia: Izobrazitelnoye Iskusstvo Publishers. ISBN 9785852001771
