= Aleksandr Gerasimov (painter) =

Russian painter (1881–1963)

- Александр Герасимов
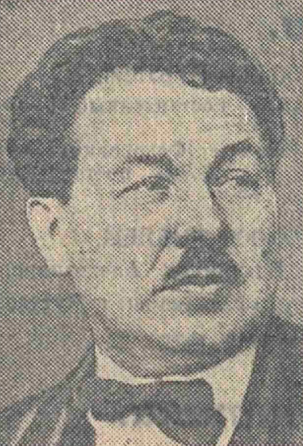
- Born: 12 August 1881; Kozlov (now Michurinsk) in Tambov, Russian Empire
- Died: 23 July 1963 (aged 81); Moscow, Russian SFSR, Soviet Union
- Movement: Socialist realism

Aleksandr Mikhailovich Gerasimov (Russian: Алекса́ндр Миха́йлович Гера́симов; 12 August [O.S. 31 July] 1881 – 23 July 1963) was a Russian painter during the Soviet era. He was a leading proponent of socialist realism in the visual arts, and painted Joseph Stalin and other Soviet leaders.

== Biography ==
Gerasimov was born on 12 August 1881 in Kozlov (now Michurinsk) in Tambov Governorate, Russian Empire. He studied at the Moscow School of Painting, Sculpture and Architecture from 1903 to 1915. There he championed traditional realistic representational art against the avant-garde.

He served in the army during World War I and the Russian Civil War. Subsequently, he returned to his hometown to become a stage designer, helping to present plays glorifying the Revolution and the Soviet government.

In 1925, Gerasimov returned to Moscow and set up a studio, combining techniques of academic realism with an Impressionistic light touch. He favored a style known as heroic realism, which featured images of revolutionary leaders such as Vladimir Lenin as larger-than-life heroes. As Stalin tightened his grip on the country, Gerasimov concentrated on official portraits, such as Stalin and Voroshilov in the Kremlin, for which he won a Stalin Prize in 1941. He produced a large number of heroic portraits of Kliment Voroshilov, to the point that Nikita Khrushchev would later accuse Voroshilov of having spent most of his time in Gerasimov's studio, to the detriment of his responsibilities as People's Commissar of Defense.

He was one of the first recipients of the honorary title "People's Artist of the USSR", established on July 26, 1943, along with artist Boris Ioganson and sculptors Sergey Merkurov and Vera Mukhina. In 1947, when the Academy of Arts of the Soviet Union was founded, he became one of its first full members, and from that same year until 1957, he served as the Academy's first president. On Gerasimov's initiative, the former estate of Ivan Morozov on Prechistenka became the Academy's residence (previously, the Museum of New Western Art was also located there, before its abolition).

Gerasimov's leadership of the Artists' Union of the USSR (replacing his nemesis and ironic namesake Sergey Vasilyevich Gerasimov) and the Soviet Academy of Arts was criticized as heavy-handed. He was at the forefront of the attacks against cosmopolitanism and formalism during the Zhdanovshchina.

Gerasimov became the first President of the Academy of Arts of the USSR when it was created in 1947 and remained in his position for 10 years until 1957, when he was replaced by Boris Ioganson

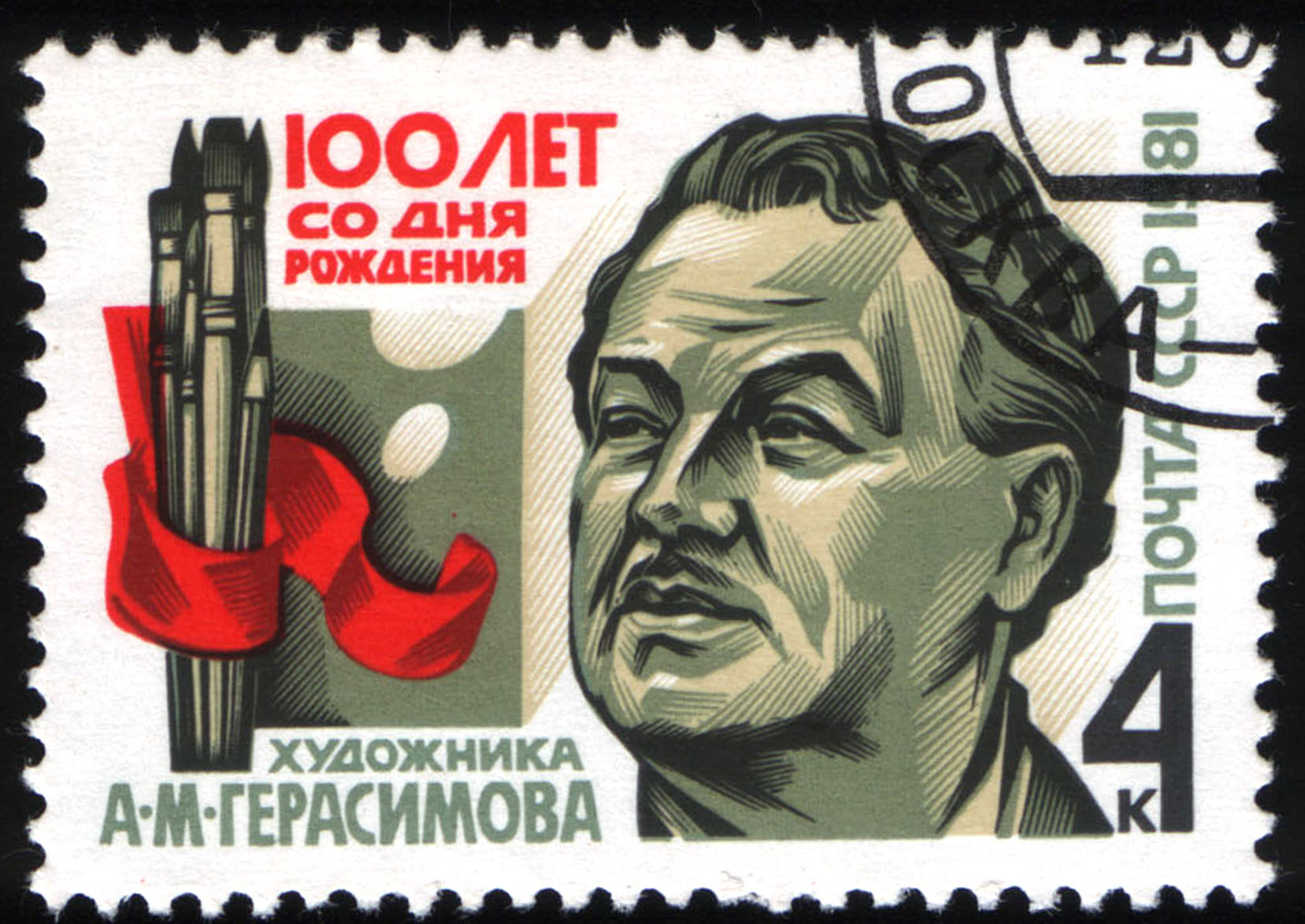
Soviet commemorative stamp of Aleksandr Gerasimov on occasion of his 100th birthday

Although his flattering portraits of Soviet leaders and his political activities against artists who would not toe his line have gained him a reputation as a political hack, Gerasimov remained a genuine artist. Even at the end of his career, he continued to follow a moody, almost Impressionistic treatment of landscapes, at odds with the conventional nature of his official portraiture.

== Selected paintings ==
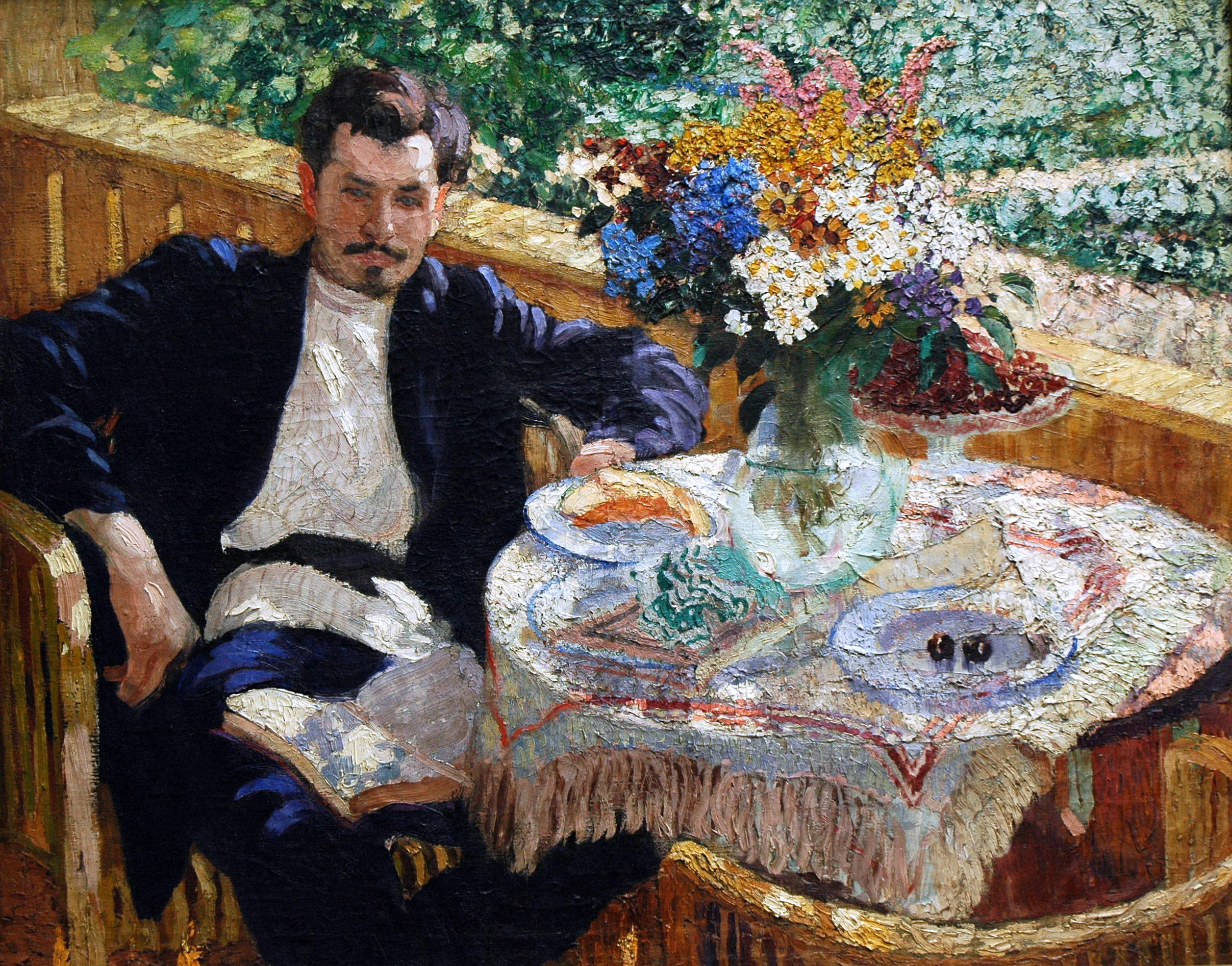
Viktor Lobanov, c. 1912–1913; Gerasimov Mansion Museum, Michurinsk

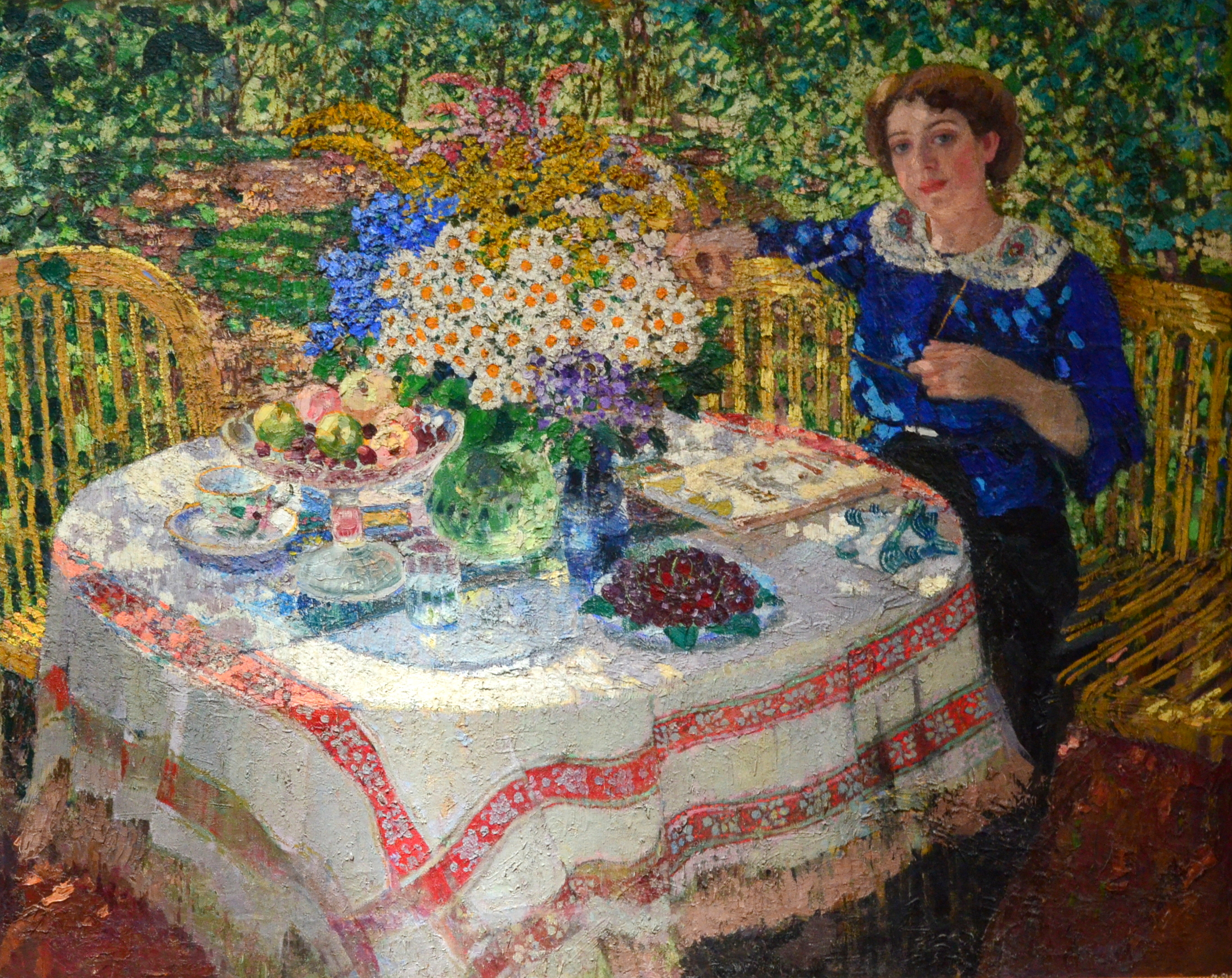
Nadezhda Gilyarovskaya, c. 1912–1913, pendant to the prior; Gerasimov Mansion Museum, Michurinsk

== Awards ==
- Stalin Prize first degree (1941)
- Stalin Prize first degree (1943)
- Stalin Prize first degree (1946)
- Stalin Prize second degree (1949)
- Order of Lenin
- Order of the Red Banner of Labour
- Medal "For Valiant Labour in the Great Patriotic War 1941–1945"
- Medal "In Commemoration of the 800th Anniversary of Moscow"
