= Stalin and Voroshilov in the Kremlin =

1938 painting by Aleksandr Gerasimov

- И. В. Сталин и К. Е. Ворошилов в Кремле (Russian)
- Artist: Aleksandr Gerasimov
- Year: 1938
- Medium: Oil on canvas
- Dimensions: 296 cm × 386 cm (117 in × 152 in)
- Location: Tretyakov Gallery, Moscow

Stalin and Voroshilov in the Kremlin (Russian: И. В. Сталин и К. Е. Ворошилов в Кремле) is a 1938 painting by Soviet painter Aleksandr Gerasimov. It depicts Soviet leaders Joseph Stalin and Kliment Voroshilov walking near the Moscow Kremlin. Since 1941 it is in the exposition of the Tretyakov Gallery in Moscow.

In the Stalinist era its replicas were very widespread, its copies being made for government institutions. Jan Plamper, a German professor studying Russian history, calls it an important sample of socialist realism and cult of personality in art.

== Literature ==
- Golomshtok, I. N. (1994). Totalitarian Art [Тоталитарное искусство]. Collins Harvill. ISBN 9780002721691.
- Plamper, Jan (2010). The Stalin Cult: A Study in the Alchemy of Power [Алхимия власти. Культ Сталина в изобразительном искусстве]. Yale University Press. ISBN 9780300169522.
