= Ekaterina Voroshilova =

Russian revolutionary

- Екатерина Ворошилова
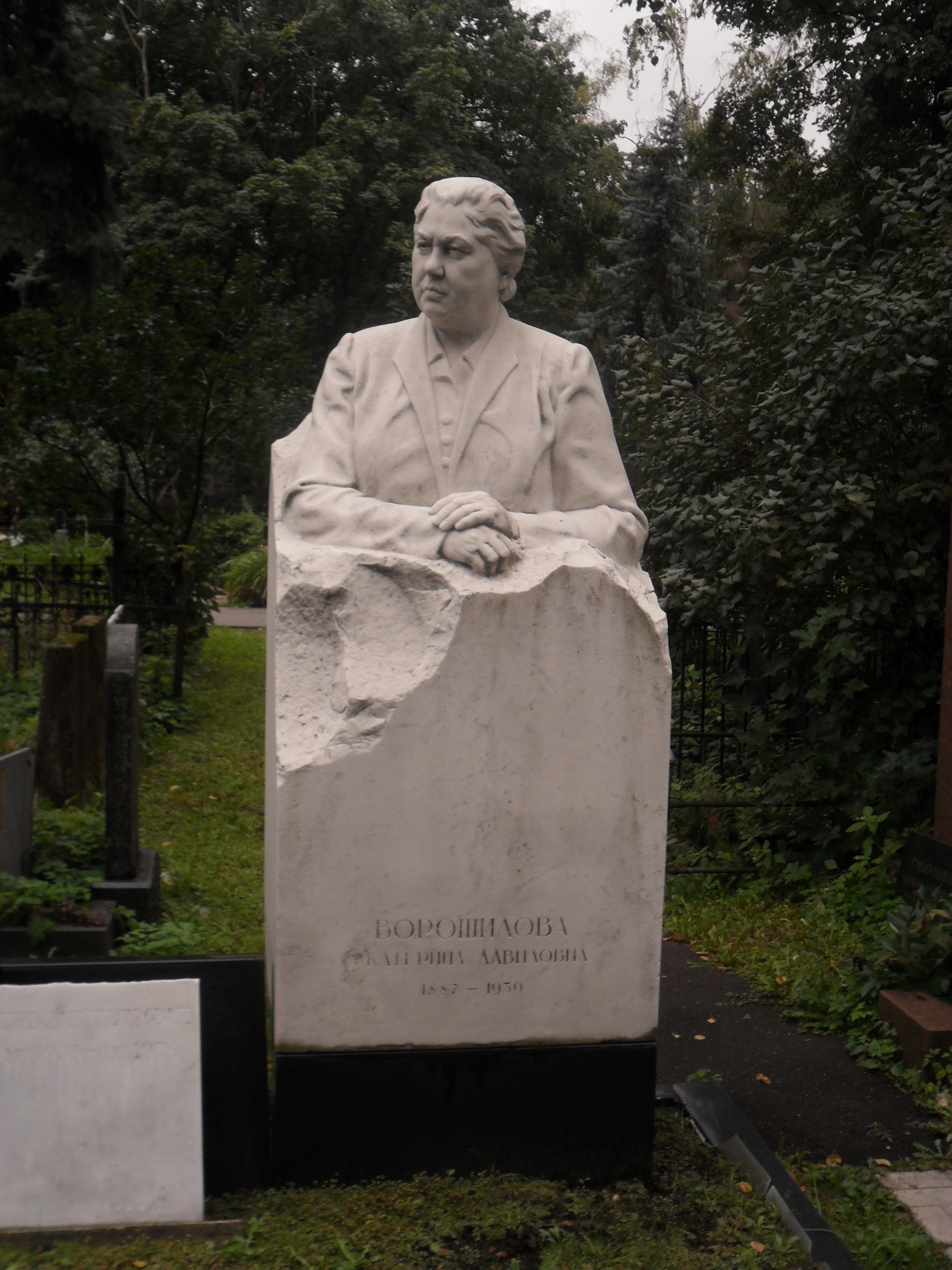
- Voroshilova's grave in Novodevichy Cemetery, Moscow
- Born: Golda Davidovna Gorbman; 1887; Mardarovka, Kherson Governorate, Russian Empire
- Died: April 1959 (aged 71–72); Moscow, Soviet Union
- Resting place: Novodevichy Cemetery
- Citizenship: Russian Empire
- Occupation: Revolutionary
- Political party: Communist Party of the Soviet Union
- Other political affiliations: Socialist Revolutionary Party
- Spouse: Kliment Yefremovich Voroshilov
- Father: David Leibovich Gorbman

Ekaterina Davidovna Voroshilova (Russian: Екатерина Давидовна Ворошилова; 1887–1959), born Gitlya Gorbman, later Golda Gorbman (Го́лда Горбман), was a spouse of Kliment Voroshilov, a Russian revolutionary and later Soviet party and state functionary.

== Biography ==
Golda Davidovna Gorbman was born in the village of Mardarovka near Odessa in 1887 to a Jewish family. Her Father, David Leibovich Gorbman, was a broker, he suffered from asthma and died in 1910.

In 1897, Golda Davidovna entered vocational school which she graduated from in 1902. She then worked as a dressmaker. After meeting Serafima Gopner she became interested in revolutionary ideas and in 1904, at the age of 17, she joined the Socialist Revolutionary Party. For her revolutionary activism, she was exiled to the Arkhangelsk province.

She made acquaintance with the exiled Kliment Voroshilov at the end of 1909 and ultimately fell in love. Having lived in her homeland for a month and a half after her release from exile, Golda returned to exile with her lover. In one of his manuscripts, Kliment Voroshilov wrote: “We met during my first exile in the Arkhangelsk province. Then they met in Ekaterinoslav and wanted to get married, but, according to church canons, Ekaterina Davidovna had to convert to Orthodoxy, and the matter stalled. When they sent me again, she came to me. The Gendarme supervising me demanded that she leave the village within 24 hours as a person who is formally an outsider.

Then Ekaterina Davidovna came up with such a trick. From some magazine we cut out a portrait of Tsar Nicholas. They hung it in the room. By the time of the expected arrival of the Gendarme, "witnesses" - local peasants - were gathered in the upper room. The gendarme arrived and began to swear: why, they say, Ekaterina Davidovna has not yet left the village? Here I'm like a bark: “Who allowed you to sit and swear in front of the portrait of the father-sovereign?”

The Gendarme, seeing the portrait, shook all over, turned white. "Don't ruin it," he wailed. - Let Ekaterina Davidovna live here as long as she wants. And I will arrange the wedding as it should be. So we got married."

Their marriage was allowed on the condition of a wedding in the church. Golda accepted Orthodox baptism and became Ekaterina Davidovna Voroshilova. The newlyweds were released from exile in September 1910. Ekaterina Voroshilova also changed her political views, becoming a Marxist. In 1917 she joined the RSDLP. She followed her husband during the Civil War, acting as an assistant and comrade-in-arms. As the wife of a commander, she took care of women, children, and the elderly.

Voroshilova was characterized by an article from the White Guard newspaper dated November 10, 1925.

It is often noted that Voroshilov’s rise was influenced, in part, by the role his wife played in his personal and intellectual development. Ekaterina Voroshilova, remembered as an elegant and charismatic woman, met her future husband while in exile and encouraged his growing interest in the works of Marx and Engels, Voroshilov later became known for his strong command of socialist theory and his remarkable ability to quote extensively Marxist texts from memory.

At the same time, Ekaterina’s active social presence in Moscow brought the couple into contact with a broad circle of cultural and political figures. These connections may have helped strengthen Voroshilov’s standing within influential circles during the formative years of his career, including the period leading to his appointment as commander of thef 1st Cavalry Army.

== Personal life ==
During the summer of 1918, she set up a women's cooperative, aiding orphaned children and helping them get adopted. Semyon Budyonny brought a young curly-haired four-year-old boy and the child won her heart due to Ekaterina not being able to conceive children. The Voroshilova's both agreed to adopt him and named him Petya.

== Death ==
In 1953, Voroshilova was diagnosed with cancer. She continued to work, hiding her illness from her husband for a long time. She died at the age of 73 in April 1959.
