= Voroshilov Sharpshooter =

Honorary Soviet military title and badge

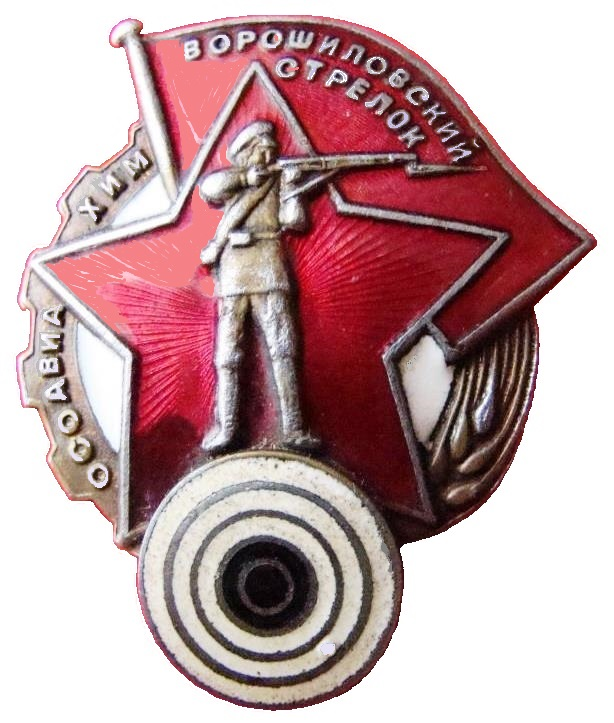
Voroshilov Sharpshooter badge

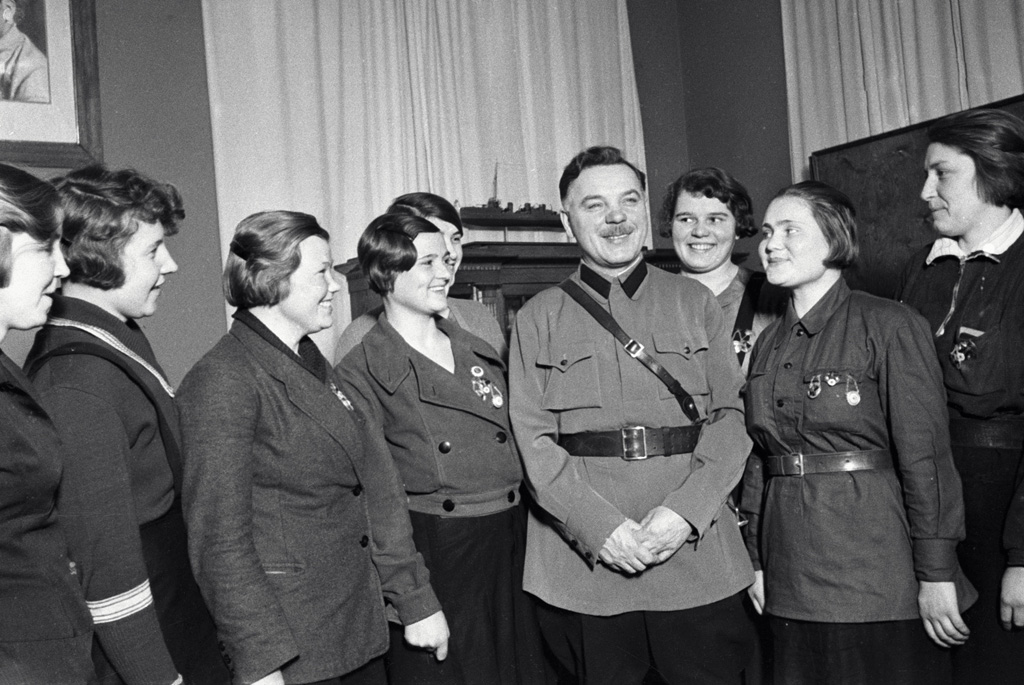
Voroshilov meeting female Komsomol members awarded with the badge

Voroshilov Sharpshooter or Voroshilov Marksman (Russian: Ворошиловский стрелок, Voroshilov Shooter) was an honorary title and a badge for marksmanship introduced in 1932 by OSOAVIAKhIM, Soviet Union. It was named after Kliment Voroshilov.

Issued by OSOAVIAKhIM, it was a civil decoration. A variant, with text "РККА" (RKKA) instead of ОСОАВИАХИМ, was also issued in the Red Army.
