= Kliment Voroshilov =

Soviet military officer and politician (1881–1969)

Marshal of the Soviet Union Kliment Voroshilov
- Климент Ворошилов
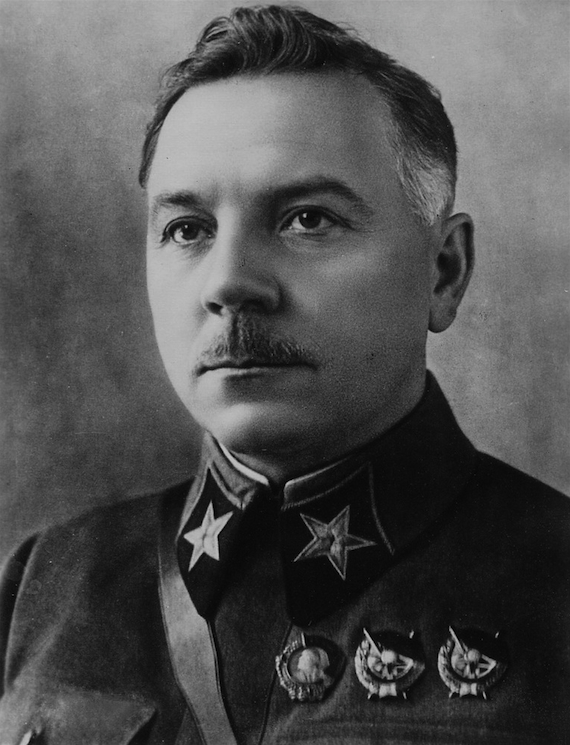
- Kliment Voroshilov c. 1937

Chairman of the Presidium of the Supreme Soviet of the Soviet Union
- In office 15 March 1953 – 7 May 1960
- Premier: Georgy Malenkov; Nikolai Bulganin; Nikita Khrushchev
- Preceded by: Nikolai Shvernik
- Succeeded by: Leonid Brezhnev

People's Commissar for Defense of the Soviet Union
- In office 6 November 1925 – 7 May 1940
- Premier: Alexei Rykov; Vyacheslav Molotov
- Preceded by: Mikhail Frunze
- Succeeded by: Semyon Timoshenko

Full member of the 14th, 15th, 16th, 17th, 18th, 19th, and 20th Presidiums
- In office 1 January 1926 – 16 July 1960

Personal details
- Born: Kliment Yefremovich Voroshilov; 4 February 1881 Verkhneye, Bakhmut uezd, Yekaterinoslav Governorate, Russian Empire
- Died: 2 December 1969 (aged 88) Moscow, Russian SFSR, Soviet Union
- Resting place: Kremlin Wall Necropolis, Moscow
- Party: RSDLP (Bolsheviks) (1903–1918); Russian Communist Party (Bolsheviks)/Communist Party of the Soviet Union (1918–1961, 1966–1969)
- Spouse: Ekaterina Davidovna
- Awards: Hero of the Soviet Union (twice); Hero of Socialist Labour; Order of Lenin (eight times); Order of the Red Banner (six times); Order of Suvorov

Military service
- Allegiance: Russian SFSR (1918–1922); Soviet Union (1922–1961)
- Branch/service: Red Army (1918–1946)
- Years of service: 1918–1946
- Rank: Marshal of the Soviet Union
- Commands: North Caucasus Military District; Moscow Military District; Leningrad Front
- Battles/wars: Russian Civil War; Battle of Tsaritsyn; Polish–Soviet War; Chinese Civil War; Sino-Soviet conflict; World War II; Winter War; Eastern Front; Operation Barbarossa; Siege of Leningrad

Kliment Yefremovich "Klim" Voroshilov (Russian: Климент Ефремович Ворошилов pronounced) (4 February 1881 – 2 December 1969), was a prominent Soviet military officer and politician during the Stalin era (1924–1953). He was one of the original five Marshals of the Soviet Union, the second highest military rank of the Soviet Union (junior to the Generalissimo of the Soviet Union, which was a post only held by Joseph Stalin), and served as Chairman of the Presidium of the Supreme Soviet, the official Soviet head of state, from 1953 to 1960.

Born to a Russian worker's family in Ukraine, Voroshilov took part in the Russian Revolution of 1917 as an early member of the Bolsheviks. He served with distinction at the Battle of Tsaritsyn, during which he became a close friend of Stalin. Voroshilov was elected to the Central Committee of the Communist Party in 1921, and in 1925 Stalin appointed him People's Commissar for Military and Navy Affairs (later People's Commissar for Defence). In 1926, he became a full member of the Politburo. In 1935, Voroshilov was named a Marshal of the Soviet Union.

At the outbreak of World War II, Voroshilov was held responsible for Soviet failures in Finland during the Winter War and was replaced as Defense Commissar by Semyon Timoshenko. Following the German invasion in June 1941, he was recalled and appointed to the State Defense Committee. Voroshilov failed to stop the German encirclement of Leningrad and was again relieved from his command in September 1941.

After the war, Voroshilov oversaw the establishment of a socialist regime in Hungary. Following Stalin's death in 1953, Voroshilov was appointed Chairman of the Presidium of the Supreme Soviet. His fortunes declined during the rise of Nikita Khrushchev and the Supreme Soviet turned against him. He peacefully resigned in 1960, although he came out of retirement in 1966 and re-joined the party. Voroshilov died in 1969 at the age of 88.

== Early life ==
Voroshilov was born in the settlement of Verkhnyeye, Bakhmut uyezd, Yekaterinoslav Governorate, Russian Empire (now part of Lysychansk city in Luhansk Oblast, Ukraine). His father, a former soldier, was employed at different times as a railway worker or miner, and went through periods of unemployment. According to the Soviet Major General Petro Grigorenko, Voroshilov himself alluded to the heritage of his birth-country (Ukraine) and to the previous family name of Voroshylo.

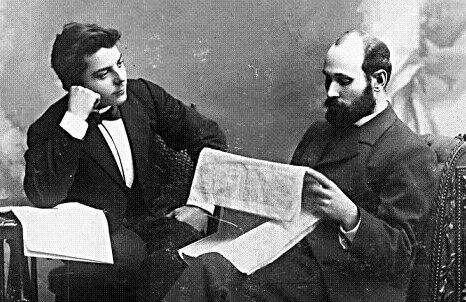
Voroshilov with his teacher Semyon Ryzhkov c. 1898–1901

In his published autobiography, Voroshilov described a childhood of extreme hardship, working from the age of six or seven, and receiving frequent beatings from wealthy peasants, which left him with a lifelong aversion to 'kulaks'. He grew up illiterate, until he was able to enroll in a newly opened school in a nearby village, at the age of 12, and received two years' schooling. During his school years, Voroshilov became a close friend and almost a member of the family of Semyon Ryzhkov.

In 1896, he started work in a factory near his home village, where he led a strike in 1899. In 1903, he enrolled in a German owned factory in Lugansk (which was renamed Voroshilov during the Stalin era). There, he joined the Bolsheviks, and acted as a strike leader during the 1905 revolution. In April 1906, he travelled to Stockholm for the Fourth Congress of the Russian Social Democratic Labour Party (RSDLP), using the provocative pseudonym 'Volodya Antimekov' or Anti-Menshevik. In Stockholm, he shared a room with the delegate from Georgia, Josif Dzhugashvili, later known as Stalin.

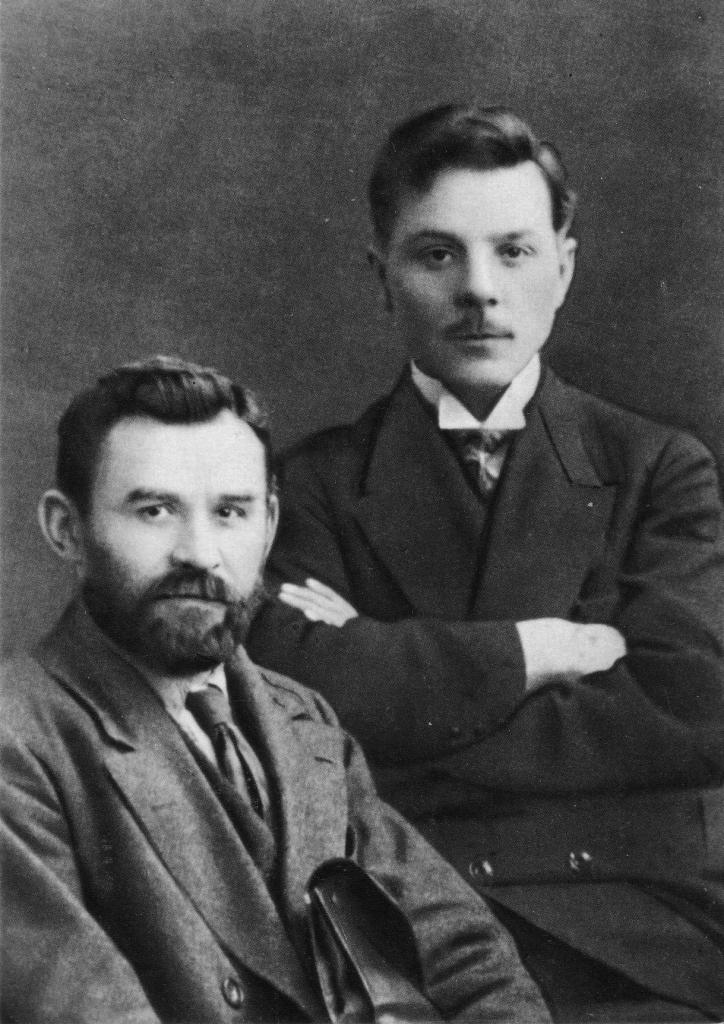
Voroshilov with Grigory Petrovsky in 1913

In spring 1907, he travelled to London for the Fifth RSDLP Congress. On his return, he was arrested and deported to Arkhangelsk, but in December he escaped and moved to Baku, where Stalin was also active. Arrested again in 1908, he was released from exile in 1912, and for a time worked in an ordnance factory in Tsaritsyn (Stalingrad/Volgograd).

== Russian Revolution and Civil War ==
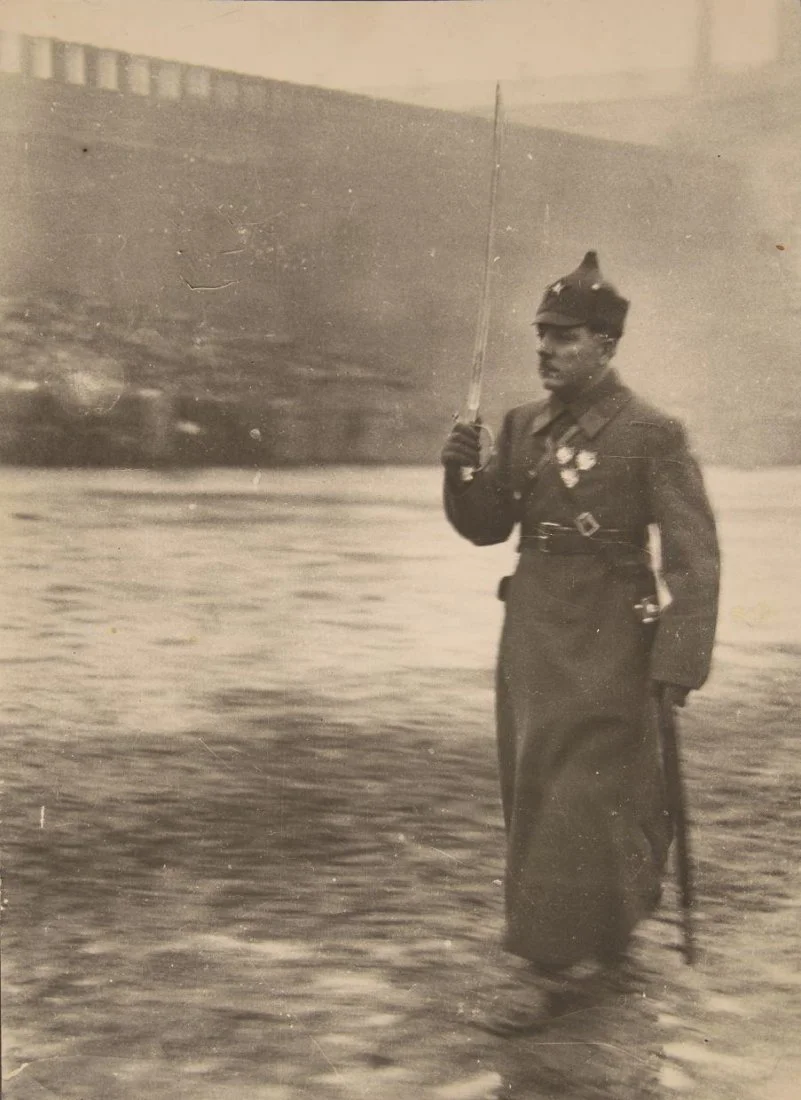
Voroshilov at a military parade on Red Square in 1920s

Voroshilov was in Petrograd (St Petersburg) during the February Revolution, but returned to Lugansk, where he was chairman of the town soviet, and was elected to the Constituent Assembly. His military career began early in 1918, when he was given command of the Fifth Ukrainian Army, which was made up of a few scattered units, who were driven out of Ukraine by the German army. After a long, hazardous retreat, his group reached Tsaritsyn, where Stalin was posted in summer 1918 as representative of the central party leadership, and where Voroshilov was given command of the Tenth Army. Stalin and Voroshilov led the Red Army's 1918 defense of Tsaritsyn. They also sponsored the creation of the first Red Cavalry unit, commanded by Semyon Budyonny, which was composed chiefly of peasants from southern Russia. In Tsaritsyn, Voroshilov clashed with Leon Trotsky, the People's Commissar for War, who considered him undisciplined and unfit to command an army, and in October 1918 threatened him with court-martial. Voroshilov was transferred to Ukraine, as commander of the Kharkiv military district, and later People's Commissar for War in the Ukraine soviet republic. He sided with the 'Military Opposition', who opposed the formation of a centralised army, preferring to rely on local mobile units, and objected to the recruitment into the Red Army of former officers from the Tsarist army. Later, during the Polish–Soviet War, Voroshilov was political commissar with Budyonny‘s First Cavalry.

== Interwar period ==
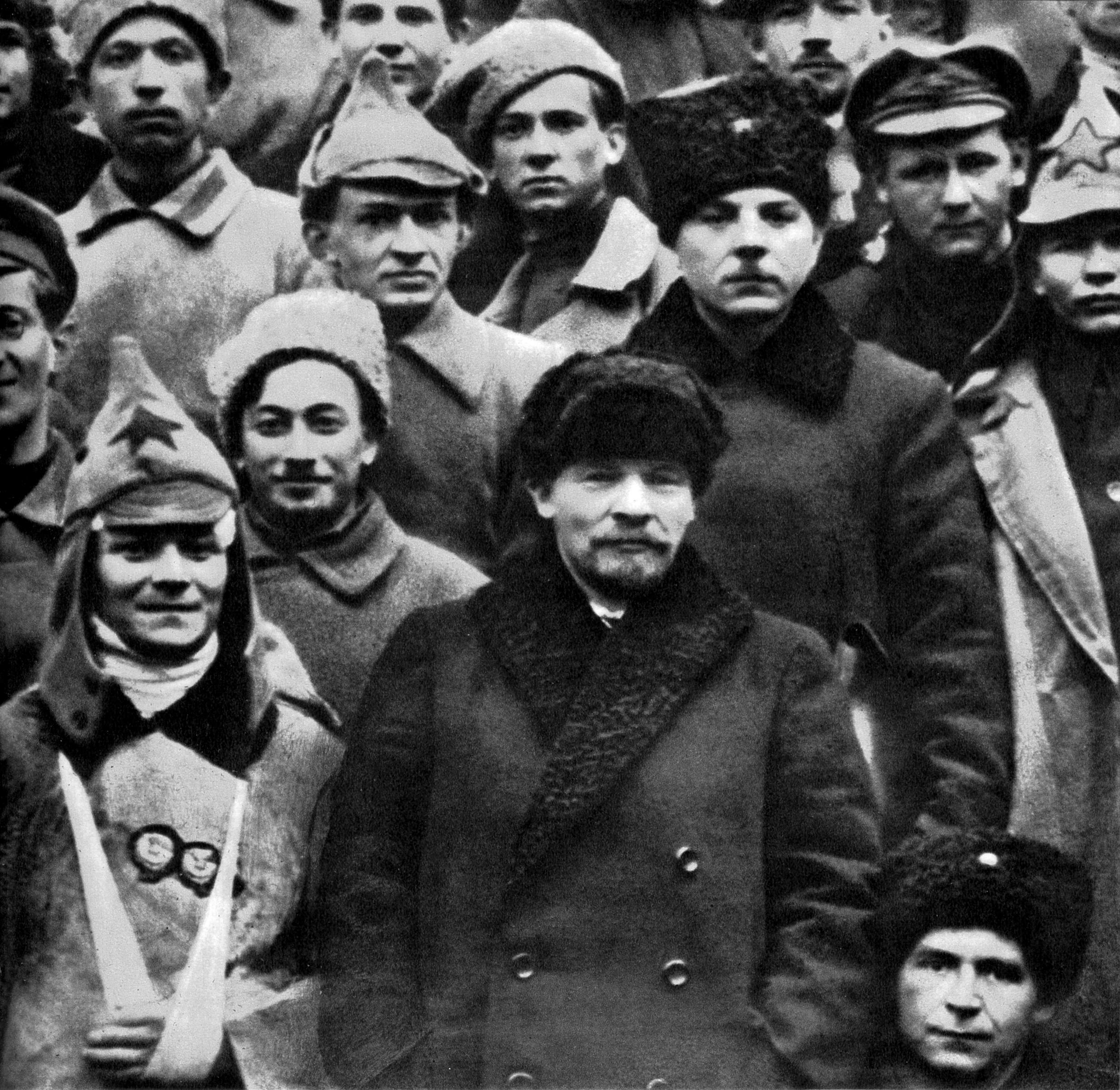
Voroshilov with Lenin among delegates of the 10th Congress of the Russian Communist Party in Moscow, 1921

Voroshilov served as a member of the Central Committee from his election in 1921 until 1961. In April 1921, he was appointed commander of the North Caucasus military district. In March 1924, he was promoted to the post of commander of the Moscow military district. In 1925, after the death of Mikhail Frunze, Voroshilov was appointed People's Commissar for Military and Navy Affairs and Chairman of the Revolutionary Military Council of the USSR, a post he held until 1934. Despite the high offices he held, Voroshilov appears not to have been part in the inner leadership. In November 1930, the chairman of the Russian government, Sergey Syrtsov, alleged that a "tiny group", which excluded Voroshilov but included nominally much less senior figures such as Pavel Postyshev, was making decisions "behind the back of the Politburo".

His main accomplishment in this period was to move key Soviet war industries east of the Urals, so that the Soviet Union could strategically retreat, while keeping its manufacturing capability intact. Frunze's political position adhered to that of the Troika (Grigory Zinoviev, Lev Kamenev, Stalin), but Stalin preferred to have a close, personal ally in charge (as opposed to Frunze, a "Zinovievite"). Frunze was urged by a group of Stalin's hand-picked doctors to have surgery to treat an old stomach ulcer, despite previous doctors' recommendations to avoid surgery and Frunze's own unwillingness. He died on the operating table of a massive overdose of chloroform, an anaesthetic. Voroshilov became a full member of the newly formed Politburo in 1926, remaining a member until 1960.

Voroshilov was appointed People's Commissar (Minister) for Defence in 1934 and a Marshal of the Soviet Union in 1935.

== The Great Purge ==
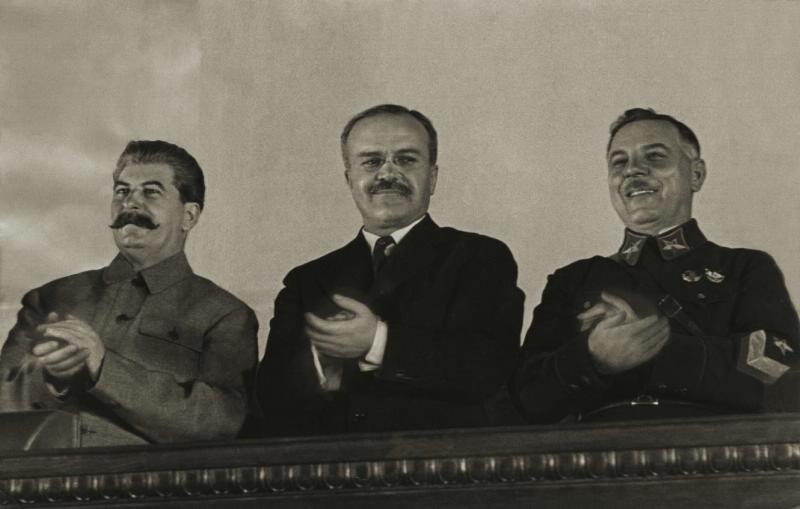
Voroshilov with Joseph Stalin and Vyacheslav Molotov in 1937 during the Great Purge

During the first of the Moscow trials, in August 1936, Voroshilov was one of four Politburo members who signed the order that appeals for clemency were to be denied and that the defendants were to be executed without delay. He was also of the main speakers at the March 1937 plenum of the Central Committee, which ended with the arrests of Nikolai Bukharin and Alexei Rykov, whom Voroshilov denounced as "renegades". In the early stages, he seemed to have believed that the purge would not affect the armed forces, and was seemingly unprepared for the arrest of Marshal Tukhachevsky and others in April and May. Voroshilov did not personally share the paranoia towards upper-class elements of the officer corps. He openly declared that the saboteurs in the Red Army were few in number and tried to save the lives of officers like Lukin, who would serve with distinction during the Second World War, and Sokolov-Strakhov, and he was sometimes successful. But on 30 May, he telephoned the commander of the Ukraine military district, Iona Yakir, ordering him to take a train to Moscow for a meeting of the Military Revolutionary Council, knowing that he would be arrested on the way. When the Council met on 1 June 1937, Voroshilov vacated the chair to deliver a report in which he said, apologetically: "I could not believe we would reveal so many and such scoundrels in the ranks of the highest command of our glorious, our valiant Workers' and Peasants' Army."

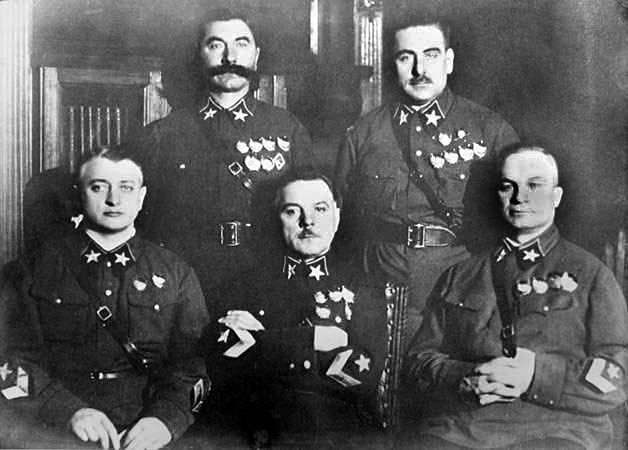
The first five Marshals of the Soviet Union, November 1935. Clockwise from top left: Budyonny, Blyukher, Yegorov, Voroshilov and Tukhachevsky. Only Voroshilov and Budyonny would survive Stalin's Great Purge.

After that, he played a central role in Stalin's Great Purge of the 1930s, denouncing many of his own military colleagues and subordinates when asked to do so by Stalin. He wrote personal letters to exiled former Soviet officers and diplomats such as commissar Mikhail Ostrovsky, asking them to return voluntarily to the Soviet Union and falsely reassuring them that they would not face retribution from authorities. Voroshilov personally signed 185 documented execution lists, fourth among the Soviet leadership after Molotov, Stalin and Kaganovich. He had no problem denouncing officers he disliked such as Tukhachevsky.

Despite taking part in the purging of many "mechanisers" (supporters of wide usage of tanks rather than cavalry) from the Red Army, Voroshilov became convinced that reliance on cavalry should be decreased while more modern arms should receive higher priority. Marshal Budyonny tried to recruit him to his cause of protecting the status of cavalry in the Red Army but Voroshilov openly declared his intention to do the opposite. He praised the army's combined arms warfare capabilities as well as the high quality and ability to take initiative of the officers during the 1936 summer manoeuvers. However he also pointed out issues in the Red Army as a whole in his full report. Among the issues he pointed out were insufficient communication, ineffective staffs, insufficient cooperation between arms, and the rudimentary nature of the command structure in tank units and other modern arms.

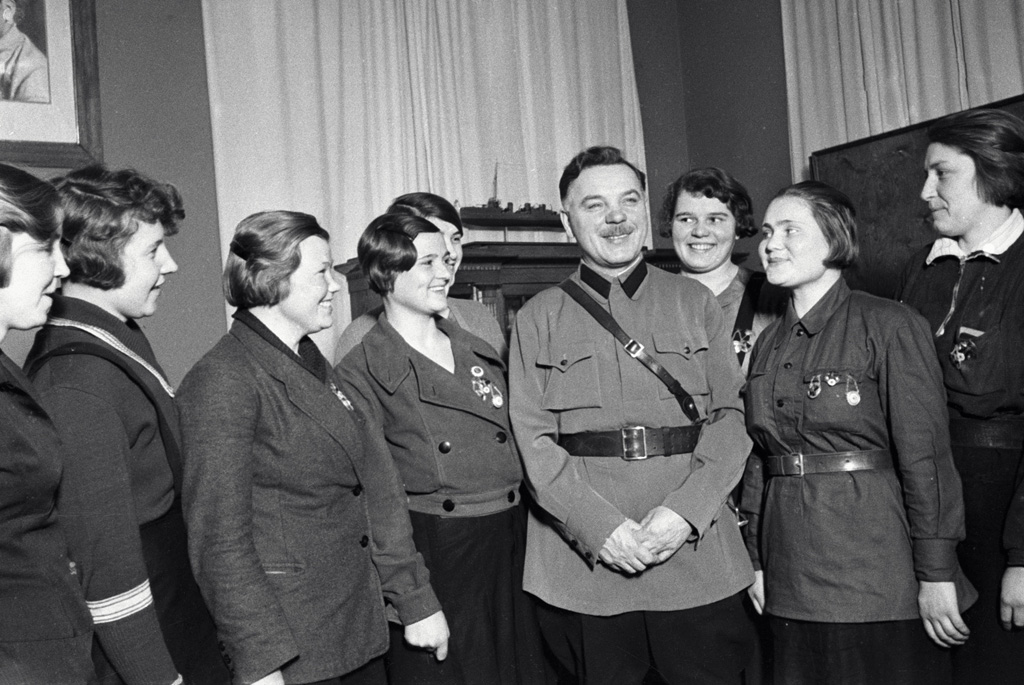
Voroshilov meeting female Komsomol members awarded with the "Voroshilov Sharpshooter" badge, 1935

When the Great Purge ended, some reforms were undertaken by the high command to reconcile Red Army doctrine (for example deep operations doctrine) with the real state of the Red Army. The politically appointed commanders of the post-purge Red Army saw that the army, especially after the purge, was not suitable to carry out deep operations style warfare. Commanders such as Voroshilov and Kulik were among the instigators of these reforms which positively impacted the Red Army. These commanders themselves turned out not to be able to carry out such operations in practice. Likewise, Voroshilov and Kulik turned out to be unable to institute the necessary reforms. One of the reforms that was implemented was a reorganization of Red Army field units, which accidentally moved Red Army organization to a far less advanced state than it had been in 1936. This reorganization was conceived by Kulik but put into practice by Voroshilov.

When territorial units were abolished Voroshilov noted that among the reasons for disbanding them was inability to train conscripts in the use of modern technology. He had openly proclaimed that the system was inadequate in an era in which imperialist powers (such as Germany) were expanding the capabilities of their armies. The territorial units had been very unpopular, not only with Voroshilov, but with the Red Army leadership a whole. They were hopelessly ineffective: territorial conscript Alexey Grigorovich Maslov noted that he never fired a shot during his training, while it was noted that these units only underwent real training in the one month a year when experienced veterans returned.

== World War II ==
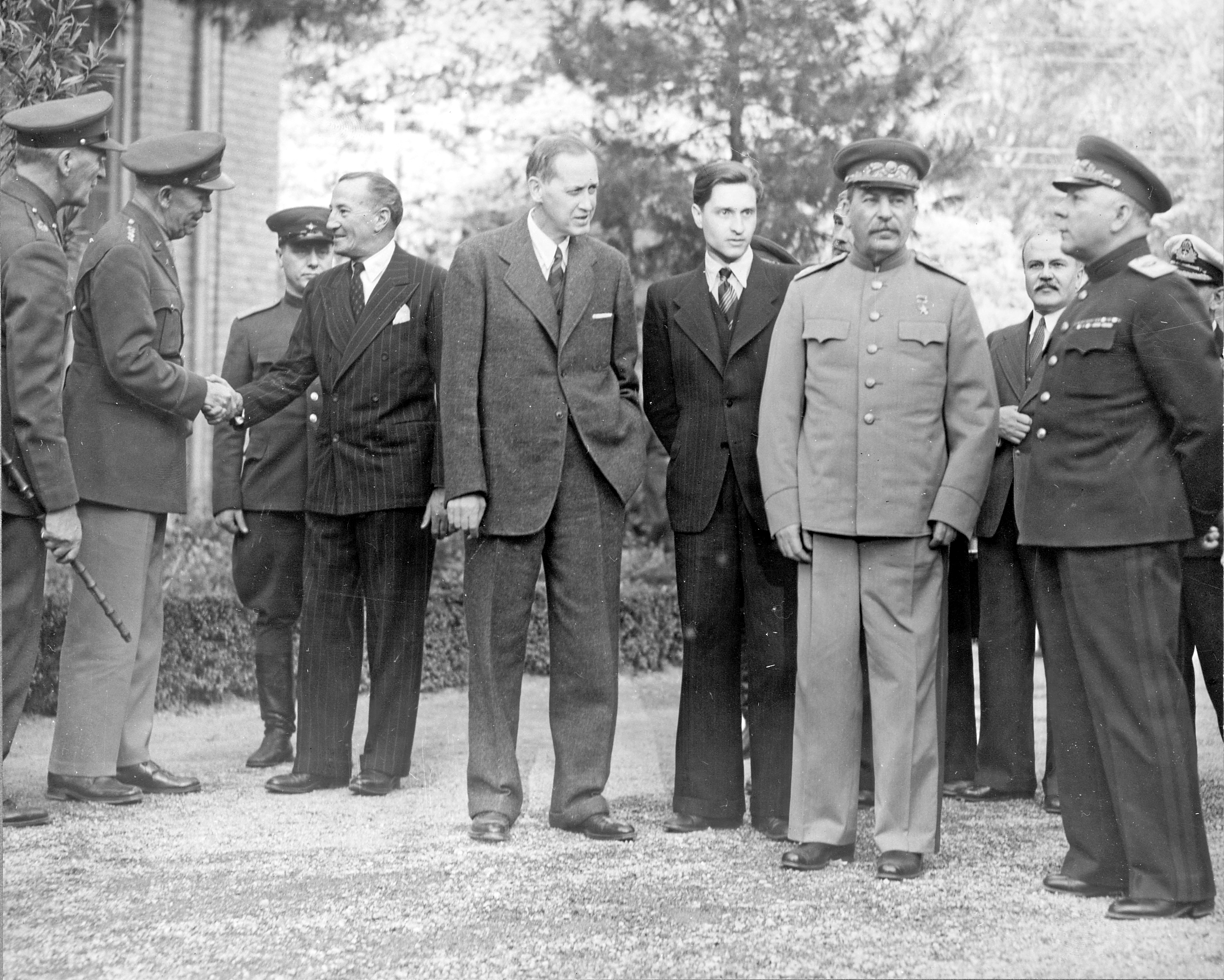
Voroshilov with Joseph Stalin, Vyacheslav Molotov, Harry Hopkins and George Marshall at the Tehran Conference in Iran, December 1943

Voroshilov commanded Soviet troops during the Winter War from November 1939 to January 1940 but, due to poor Soviet planning and Voroshilov's incompetence as a general, the Red Army suffered about 320,000 casualties compared to 70,000 Finnish casualties. When the leadership gathered at Stalin's dacha at Kuntsevo, Stalin shouted at Voroshilov for the losses; Voroshilov replied in kind, blaming the failure on Stalin for eliminating the Red Army's best generals in his purges. Voroshilov followed this retort by smashing a platter of food on the table. Nikita Khrushchev said it was the only time he ever witnessed such an outburst. Voroshilov was nonetheless made the scapegoat for the initial failures in Finland. He was later replaced as Defense Commissar by Semyon Timoshenko. Voroshilov was then made Deputy Premier responsible for cultural matters. Voroshilov initially argued that thousands of Polish army officers captured in September 1939 should be released, but he later signed the order for their execution in the Katyn massacre of 1940.

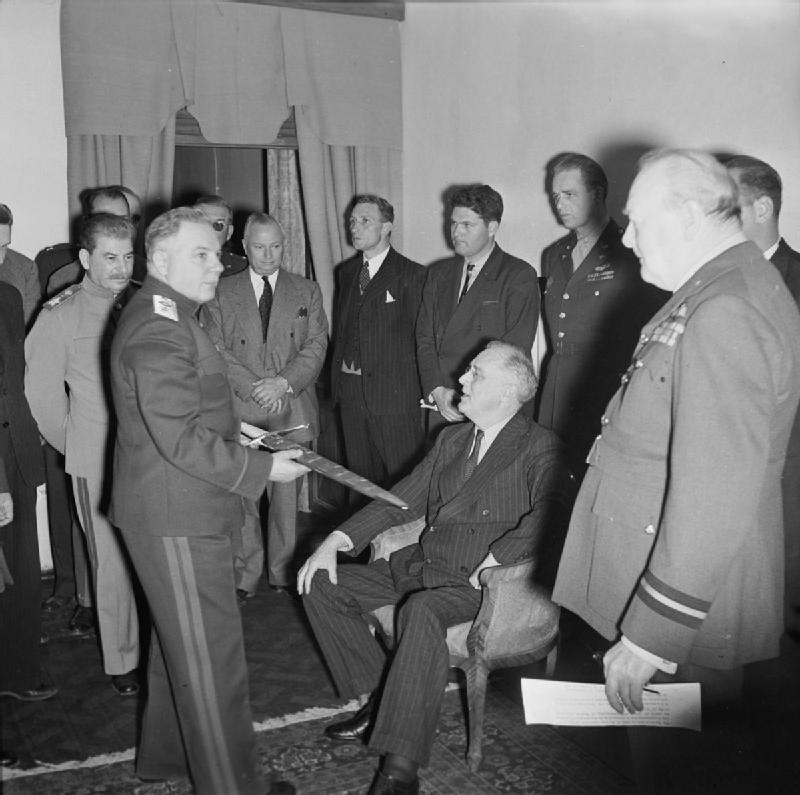
Voroshilov shows the Sword of Stalingrad to US President Franklin D. Roosevelt while the British Prime Minister Winston Churchill and Stalin look on. Moments before this photograph was taken, Voroshilov dropped the sword.

Between 1941 and 1944, Voroshilov was a member of the State Defense Committee.

After the German invasion of the Soviet Union in June 1941, Voroshilov became commander of the short-lived Northwestern Direction (July to August 1941), controlling several fronts. In September 1941 he commanded the Leningrad Front. Working alongside military commander Andrei Zhdanov as German advances threatened to cut off Leningrad, he displayed considerable personal bravery in defiance of heavy shelling at Ivanovskoye; at one point he rallied retreating troops and personally led a counter-attack against German tanks armed only with a pistol. However, the style of counterattack he launched had long since been abandoned by strategists and drew mostly contempt from his military colleagues; he failed to prevent the Germans from surrounding Leningrad and he was dismissed from his post and replaced by Georgy Zhukov on 8 September 1941. Stalin had a political need for popular wartime leaders, however, and Voroshilov remained as an important figurehead.

== Post war ==
=== Hungary ===
Between 1945 and 1947, Voroshilov supervised the establishment of the socialist republic in postwar Hungary. He attributed the poor showing of the Hungarian Communist Party in the October 1945 Budapest municipal elections to the number of minorities in leadership positions, arguing that it was "detrimental to the party that its leaders are not of Hungarian origin".

=== 1952–1953 Soviet leadership ===
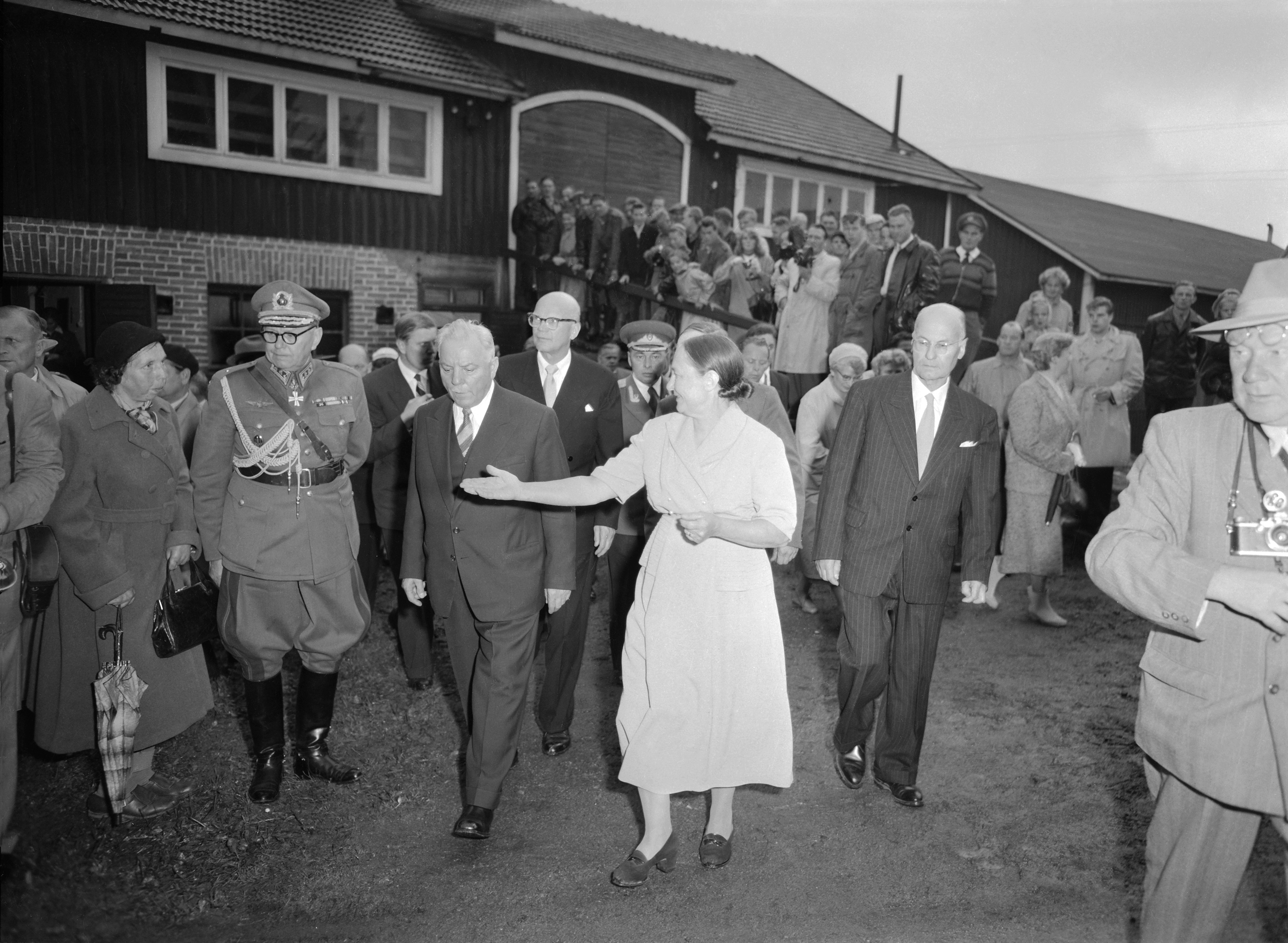
Voroshilov with Urho Kekkonen visiting a farm in Finland

In 1952, Voroshilov was appointed a member of the Presidium of the Communist Party of the Soviet Union.

Stalin's death on 5 March 1953 prompted major changes in the Soviet leadership. On 15 March 1953, Voroshilov was approved as Chairman of the Presidium of the Supreme Soviet (i.e., the head of state) with Nikita Khrushchev as First Secretary of the Communist Party and Georgy Malenkov as Premier of the Soviet Union. Voroshilov, Malenkov, and Khrushchev brought about the 26 June 1953 arrest of Lavrenty Beria after Stalin's death.

One of Voroshilov's responsibilities as chairman of the Presidium was to oversee the appeal review of Soviet death row inmates. Analysis by Jeffrey S. Hardy and Yana Skorobogatov describe his role thus:

"Chairman Voroshilov presided over the meetings and clearly had the most influential voice, but split votes were not uncommon and Voroshilov was sometimes outvoted... Throughout his tenure as Presidium chair, he behaved like someone who believed that one should follow established procedure and not act too quickly in matters of life and death."

Hardy and Skorobogatov indicate that Voroshilov frequently exerted his influence on the committee toward leniency, especially in the case of those who expressed repentance in their appeal documents and those convicted of crimes of passion or under the influence of alcohol; he judged those convicted of political crimes or acts with financial motives more harshly. During his tenure, many individuals sentenced to death had their punishments commuted to prison terms of varying lengths. The authors of the study observe that his successor, Brezhnev, took a noticeably harder line in appeals cases.

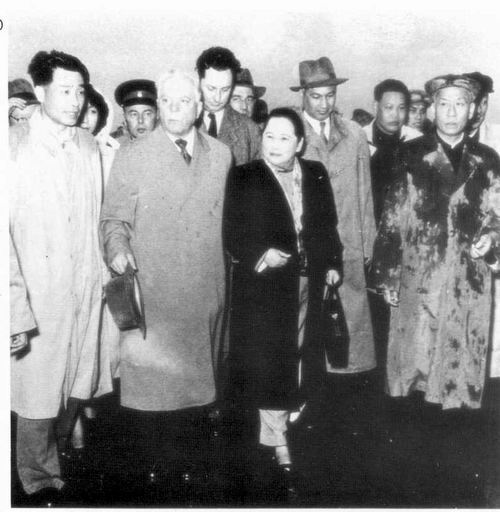
Voroshilov with Soong Ching-ling and Liu Shaoqi in Beijing, China, 1957

However, the contrast between Voroshilov's relatively magnanimous attitude toward pardon cases in the 1950s with his well-documented participation in the deadly purges of the 1930s (as described above) was noted even at the time by Khrushchev, who asked him, "So when were you acting according to your conscience, then or now?"

=== Fall from grace ===
After Khrushchev removed most of Stalin's closest associates, such as Molotov and Malenkov, from the party, Voroshilov's career began to fade. On 7 May 1960, the Supreme Soviet of the Soviet Union granted Voroshilov's request for retirement and elected Leonid Brezhnev chairman of the Presidium of the Supreme Council (the head of state). The Central Committee also relieved him of duties as a member of the Party Presidium (as the Politburo had been called since 1952) on 16 July 1960. In October 1961, his political defeat was complete at the 22nd party congress when he was excluded from election to the Central Committee.

Following Khrushchev's fall from power, Soviet leader Brezhnev brought Voroshilov out of retirement into a figurehead political post. Voroshilov was again re-elected to the Central Committee in 1966. Voroshilov was awarded a second medal of Hero of the Soviet Union 1968.

== Death ==
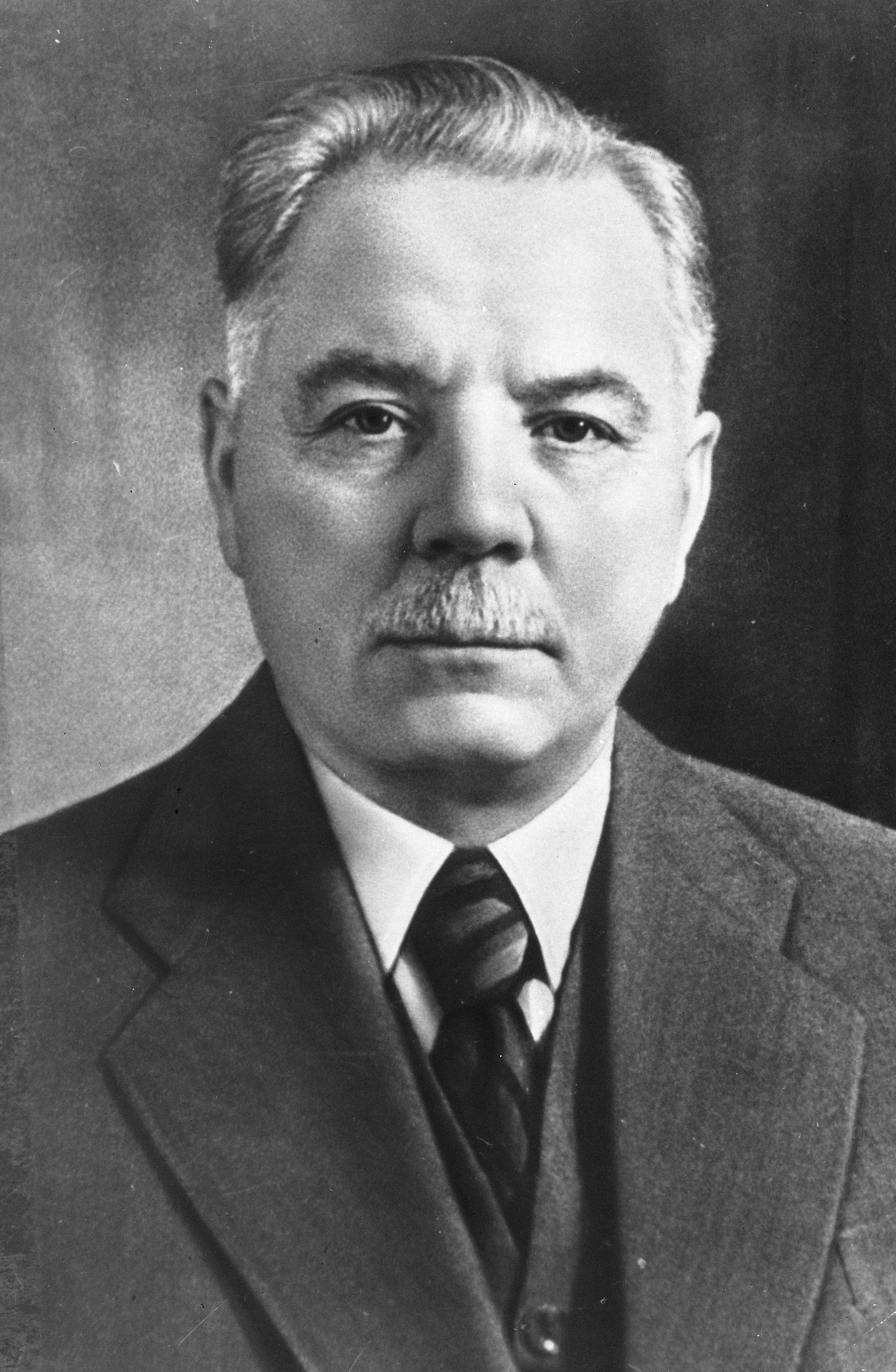
Voroshilov c. 1961

During a winter night in 1969, Voroshilov started to feel unwell. His family proposed to call an ambulance immediately, but he adamantly refused. In the morning he put on his military uniform, and after calling a car, he went to the hospital himself, fully decorated. Voroshilov died on 2 December, at the age of 88, and was buried in the Kremlin Wall Necropolis, in one of the twelve individual tombs located between the Lenin Mausoleum and the Kremlin Wall.

== Personal life ==
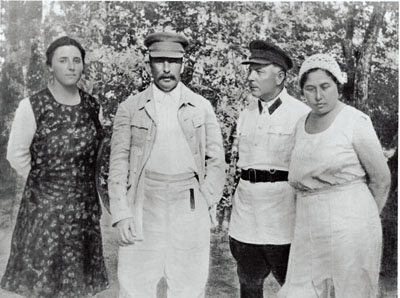
Voroshilov and his wife Ekaterina with Stalin and his wife Nadezhda at a picnic in the late 1920s

Voroshilov was married to Ekaterina Voroshilova, born Golda Gorbman, a Ukrainian Jew from Mardarovka. She changed her name when she converted to Orthodox Christianity in order to be allowed to marry Voroshilov. They met while both were exiled in Arkhangelsk, where Ekaterina was sent in 1906. While both serving on the Tsaritsyn Front in 1918, where Ekaterina was helping orphans, they adopted a four-year-old orphan boy who they named Petya. They also adopted the children of Mikhail Frunze following his death in 1925. During Stalin's rule, they lived in the Kremlin at the Horse Guards.

His personality as it was described by Molotov in 1974: "Voroshilov was nice, but only in certain times. He always stood for the political line of the party, because he was from a working class, a common man, very good orator. He was clean, yes. And he was personally devoted to Stalin. But his devotion was not very strong. However in this period he advocated Stalin very actively, supported him in everything, though not entirely sure in everything. It also affected their relationship. This is a very complex issue. This must be taken into account to understand why Stalin treated him critically and not invited him at all our conversations. At least at private ones. But he came by himself. Stalin frowned. Under Khrushchev, Voroshilov behaved badly."

== Honours and awards ==
=== Soviet Union ===
External videos
- One of many Soviet songs dedicated to Voroshilov

The Kliment Voroshilov (KV) series of tanks, used in World War II, was named after him. Two towns were also named after him: Voroshilovsk in Donbas (now Alchevsk) Voroshilovgrad in Ukraine (now changed back to the historical Luhansk) and Voroshilov in the Soviet Far East (now renamed Ussuriysk after the Ussuri river), as well as the General Staff Academy in Moscow. Stavropol was called Voroshilovsk from 1935 to 1943.

- Hero of the Soviet Union, two times (No. 10840 – 3 February 1956 (in conjunction with his 75th birthday), No. 47 – 22 February 1968 (in conjunction with the 50th anniversary of the Armed Forces of the USSR))
- Hero of Socialist Labour (No. 10268 – 7 May 1960)
- Order of Lenin, eight times (No. 880 – 23 February 1935, No. 3582 – 22 February 1938, No. 14851 – 3 February 1941, No. 26411 – 21 February 1945, No. 128065 – 3 February 1951, No. 313410 – 3 February 1956, No. 331807 – 3 February 1961, No. 340967 – 22 February 1968)
- Order of the Red Banner, six times (No. 47 – 26 June 1919, No. 629 – 2 April 1921, No. 27 – 3–2 December 1925, No. 5 – 4–22 February 1930, No. 1 – 5–3 November 1944, No. 1–24 June 1948)
- Order of Suvorov, 1st class (No. 125 – 22 February 1944)
- Order of the Red Banner of the Uzbek Soviet Socialist Republic (17 February 1930)
- Order of the Red Banner of the Tajik SSR (No. 148 – 14 January 1933)
- Order of the Red Banner ZSFSR (25 February 1933)
- Jubilee Medal "XX Years of the Workers' and Peasants' Red Army" (22 February 1938)
- Medal "For the Victory over Germany in the Great Patriotic War 1941–1945" (1945)
- Medal "For the Defence of Leningrad"
- Medal "For the Defence of Moscow"
- Medal "For the Defence of the Caucasus"
- Medal "In Commemoration of the 800th Anniversary of Moscow" (21 September 1947)
- Jubilee Medal "30 Years of the Soviet Army and Navy" (22 February 1948)
- Jubilee Medal "40 Years of the Armed Forces of the USSR" (17 February 1958)
- Jubilee Medal "50 Years of the Armed Forces of the USSR"
- Jubilee Medal "Twenty Years of Victory in the Great Patriotic War 1941–1945" (1965)
- Honorary Revolutionary Weapon (1920, 1968)

=== Foreign awards ===
==== Mongolia ====
- Hero of the Mongolian People's Republic (29 May 1957)
- Order of Sukhbaatar, twice
- Order of the Red Banner
- Order of the Polar Star

==== Finland ====
- Grand Cross of the Order of the White Rose of Finland (1955)

==== Turkey ====
- Honorary citizen of İzmir, November 1933; in İzmir a street was also named after him. In 1951, it was renamed "Plevne Bulvarı".

== See also ==
- Outline of the Russian Revolution and Civil War
- Bibliography of the Russian Revolution and Civil War
- Bibliography of Stalinism and the Soviet Union
- Index of Old Bolsheviks
- Index of articles related to the Russian Revolution and Civil War
- Stalin's Peasants: Resistance and Survival in the Russian Village after Collectivization
- Everyday Stalinism: Ordinary Life in Extraordinary Times: Soviet Russia in the 1930s
- Stalin: Waiting for Hitler, 1929–1941
- Voroshilov Sharpshooter
- "Stalin and Voroshilov in the Kremlin," a famous Soviet painting
- Soviet cruiser Voroshilov

Political offices
| Preceded by Nikolay Shvernik | Chairman of the Presidium of the Supreme Soviet of the Soviet Union; 1953–1960 | Succeeded by Leonid Brezhnev |
| Preceded by Mikhail Frunze | People's Commissar of Defense; 1925–1940 | Succeeded by Semyon Timoshenko |
