= List of rural localities in Tula Oblast =

Map of Russia with Tula Oblast highlighted

This is a list of rural localities in Tula Oblast. Tula Oblast (Russian: Ту́льская о́бласть, Tulskaya oblast) is a top-level political division of European Russia (namely an oblast). Its present borders were set on 26 September 1937. The city of Tula is its administrative center. The oblast has an area of 25,700 square kilometers (9,900 sq mi) and, as of 2010, had a population of 1,553,925. Since 2 February 2016, the current governor of the oblast has been Alexey Dyumin.

== Locations ==
- Arkhangelskoye
- Chermoshnya
- Iskan
- Kazakovka
- Kobylinka
- Krapivna
- Leninsky
- Lipovo
- Lukino
- Lukovitsy
- Olen
- Sonino
- Taydakovo
- Telezhyonka
- Temyan
- Toropovo
- Velmino

== See also ==
- Lists of rural localities in Russia
