= Zaoksky =

Zaoksky (masculine), Zaokskaya (feminine), or Zaokskoye (neuter) may refer to:

- Zaoksky District, a district of Tula Oblast, Russia
- Zaoksky (urban-type settlement), an urban locality (a work settlement) in Zaoksky District of Tula Oblast, Russia
- Zaokskoye, a rural locality (a selo) in Ryazan Oblast, Russia

== See also ==
- Zaoksky Adventist University (Zaokskaya dukhovnaya akademiya), a private Christian university in Tula Oblast, Russia
