= Kazakovka =

Kazakovka may refer to:

- Kazakovka, Nizhny Novgorod Oblast, a village (selo) in Nizhny Novgorod Oblast, Russia
- Kazakovka, Tula Oblast, a village in Tula Oblast, Russia
- Kazakovka, name of several other rural localities in Russia
