= Taydakovo =

Taydakovo may refer to:

- Taydakovo, Samara Oblast, a village (selo) in Samara Oblast, Russia
- Taydakovo, Tula Oblast, a village in Tula Oblast, Russia
- Taydakovo, Ryazan Oblast, human settlement in Shilovsky District, Ryazan Oblast, Russia
