= Lukino =

Lukino may refer to:

- Lukino, Tula Oblast, a village in Tula Oblast, Russia
- Lukino, name of several other rural localities in Russia
