= Christ and the Woman Taken in Adultery (Polenov) =

1888 painting by Vasily Polenov

Christ and the Woman Taken in Adultery (He That Is Without Sin?)
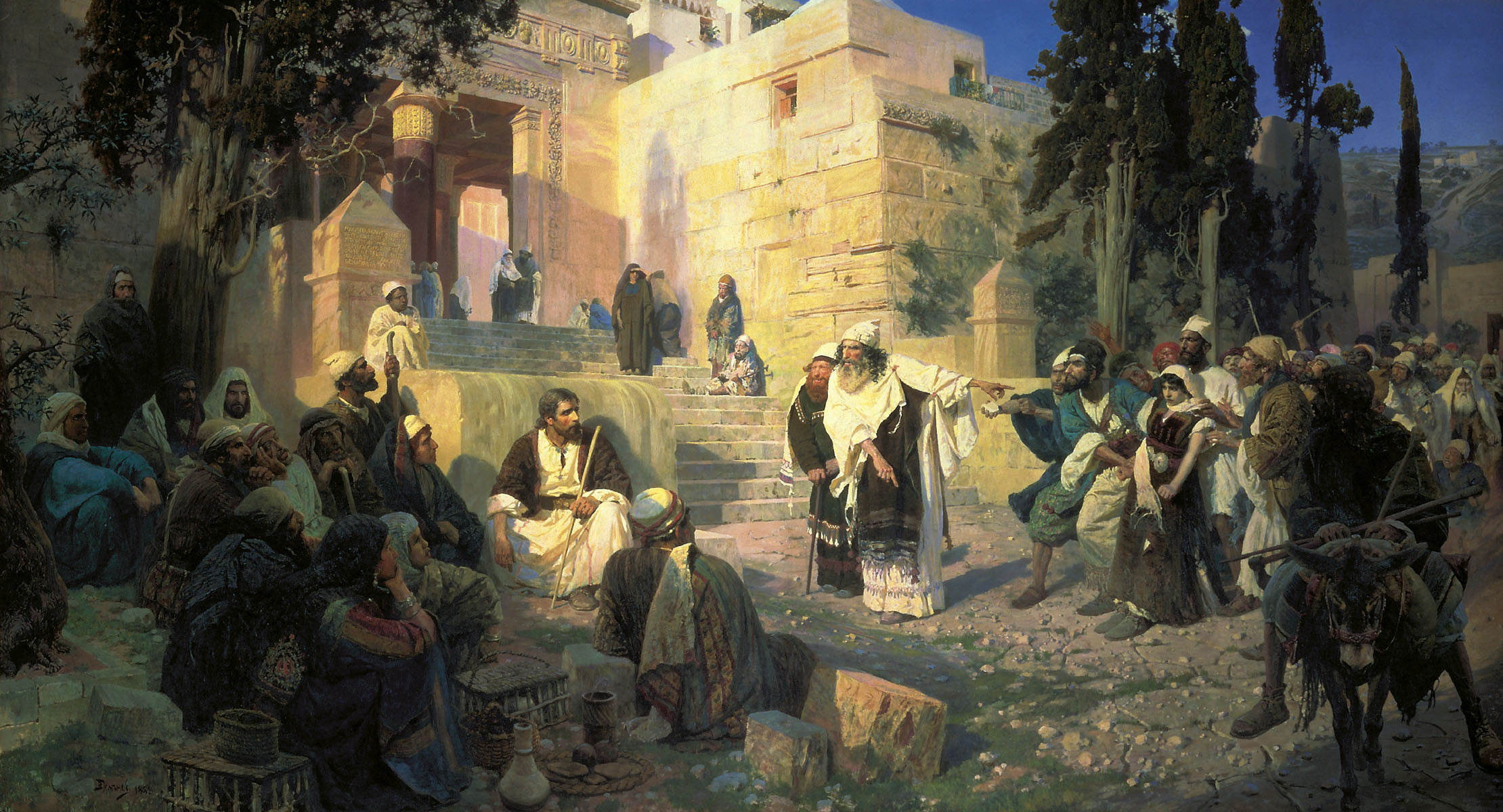
- Artist: Vasily Polenov
- Year: 1888
- Medium: Oil on canvas
- Dimensions: 325 cm × 611 cm (128 in × 241 in)
- Location: State Russian Museum, Saint Petersburg

Christ and the Woman Taken in Adultery (He That Is Without Sin?) (Russian: «Христо́с и гре́шница» («Кто без греха́?»)) is a large oil painting by the Russian artist Vasily Polenov (1844–1927), dated 1888. The painting is now in the State Russian Museum in Saint Petersburg (Inventory Zh-4204). Measuring 325 × 611 cm, it depicts the story of Christ and the woman taken in adultery, described in the Gospel of John.

The painting was conceived by the artist in the late 1860s, with the first sketches appearing in the early 1870s. Some fifteen years passed before the final version of the canvas was completed. While working on the painting, Polenov travelled to the Middle East (1881–1882) and Italy (1883–1884).

The canvas was presented at the 15th Exhibition of the Society for Travelling Art Exhibitions (Peredvizhniki), which opened in Saint Petersburg on 25 February 1887. At the exhibition, the painting was purchased by Tsar Alexander III. The painting was then kept in the Winter Palace, and when the Russian Museum was founded, it became part of its collection in 1897.

On the one hand, the painting is seen as an attempt at a realistic interpretation of the image of Christ and the Gospel story. On the other hand, art historians have also identified the influence of late academicism on the painting, noting that among the attempts to revive large-format academic historical painting, "Polenov's painting is the most significant and serious".

== History ==
=== Conception and work on the painting ===
The concept for the future canvas, entitled Christ and the Woman Taken in Adultery, was first conceived in 1868, influenced by Alexander Andreyevich Ivanov's painting The Appearance of Christ Before the People. Polenov set himself the task of creating "Christ not only coming, but already in the world, making his way among the people". The book The Life of Jesus by the French philosopher and writer Ernest Renan, which emphasised the human nature of Christ, had a significant influence on the interpretation of the subject. By the time work on the painting began, Russian painting had already produced such famous canvases on Gospel themes as the Last Supper by Nikolai Ge and Christ in the Desert by Ivan Kramskoi.

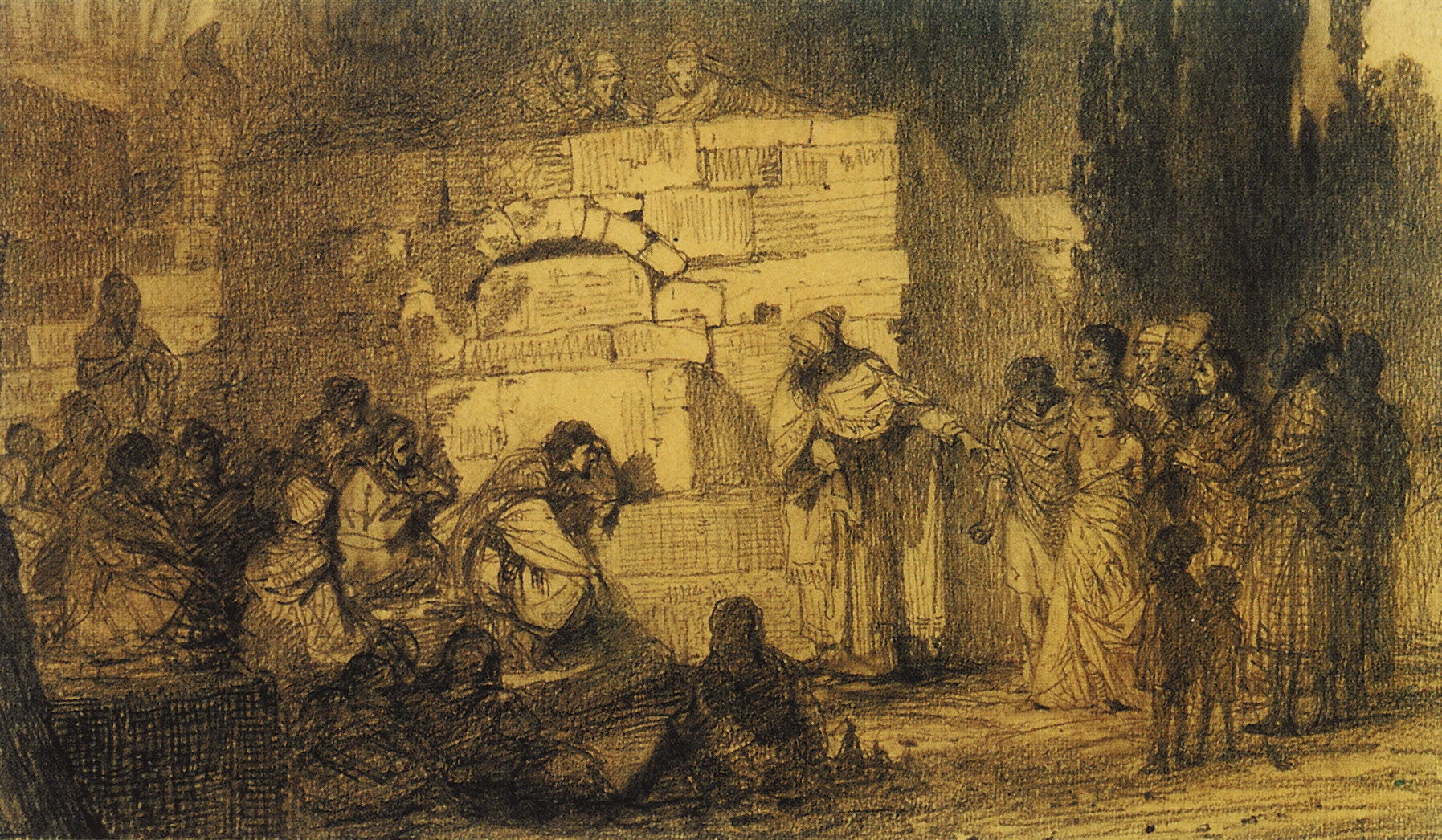
Christ and the Woman Taken in Adultery (sketch, 1873, paper, pencil, State Russian Museum)

The initial sketches and studies for the painting were created in the 1870s. Of these, two are particularly noteworthy – the 1873 sketch, which aligns with the original concept of the painting, and the 1876 sketch, which is closer to the final composition of the canvas. After that, work on the painting came to a standstill, but in 1881, when the artist's sister Vera Dmitrievna Polenova (the twin of Vasily Polenov) was dying, she made her brother promise to resume work on the painting and also asked that the canvas be large. By then, Polenov had become quite successful in the genre of landscape painting, but, fulfilling the promise to his sister, he returned to historical painting.

In 1881–1882, Polenov undertook a journey to the Middle East, which was largely associated with the work on Christ and the Woman Taken in Adultery. He travelled to Constantinople, Alexandria, Cairo, and Aswan, visited Palestine and Syria, and also stopped by Greece. Polenov's travelling companions were the linguist and archaeologist Semyon Abamelek-Lazarev and the art historian Adrian Prakhov. The trip provided Polenov with a substantial corpus of observations pertaining to the nature and architecture of Palestine, as well as the appearance and customs of its population. The artist subsequently employed these techniques to achieve greater realism in his depictions of the Gospel narrative. However, the outcomes of the journey did not significantly advance Polenov's progress towards the realization of his intended painting of Christ and the Woman Taken in Adultery, as he devoted minimal time to making sketches and studies during the expedition.

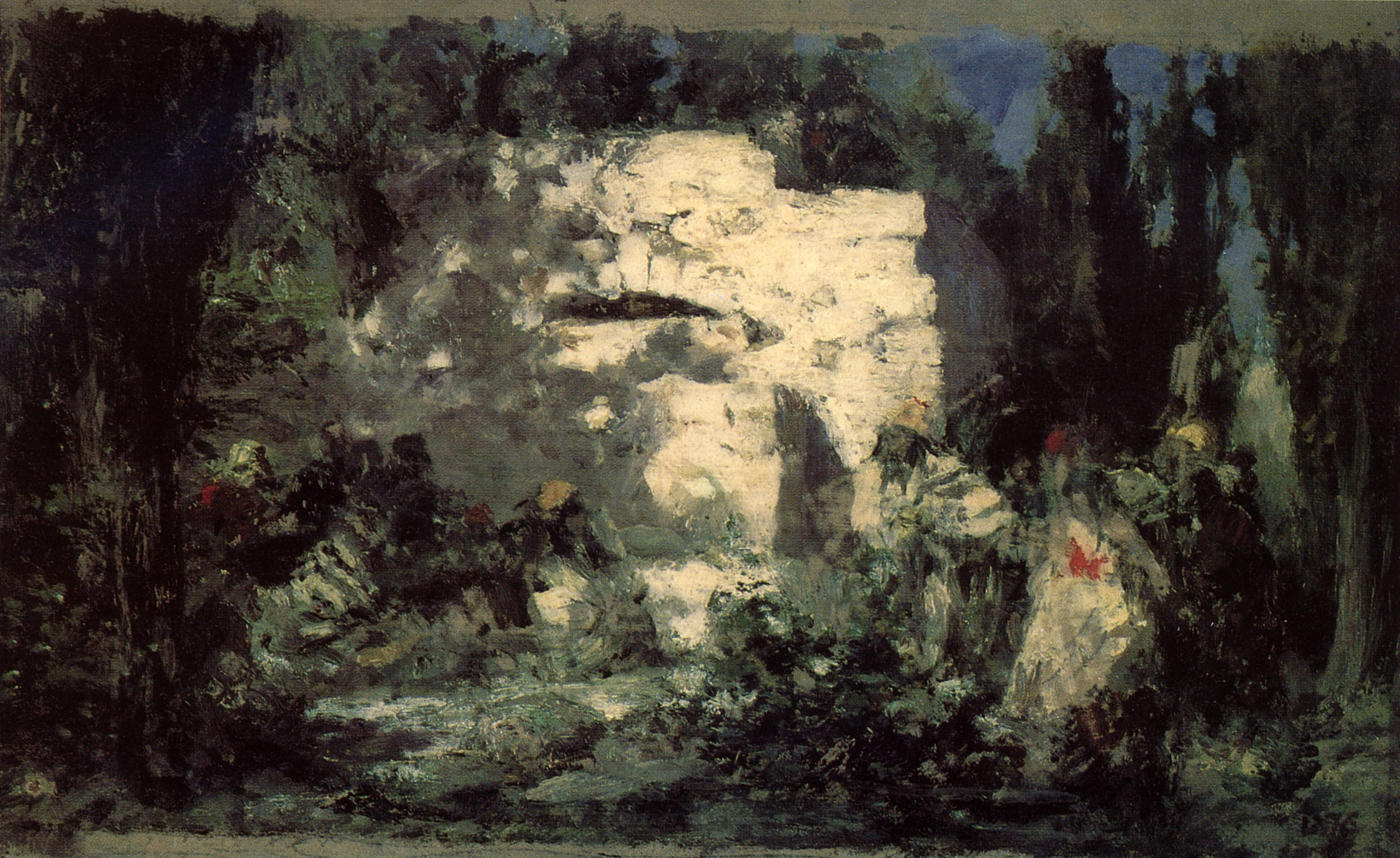
Christ and the Woman Taken in Adultery (sketch, 1876, State Tretyakov Gallery)

In the spring of 1883, already a teacher at the Moscow School of Painting, Sculpture and Architecture, Polenov finally began work on a large painting. However, it became evident that the material collected during his trip to the Middle East was insufficient for the task at hand. While he had landscape sketches and architectural sketches, he lacked sufficient images of people. To address this deficiency, Polenov took a year's leave from his academic position and, accompanied by his wife, Natalia Vasilyevna, departed for Rome at the end of October 1883. Their itinerary included visits to Vienna, Venice, and Florence. Consequently, in the 1883–1884 period, Polenov continued his work on the painting in Rome. He proceeded to refine the sketches and also produced images of Italian Jews. In a letter to his sister Elena Dmitrievna, Natalia Vasilievna described the Roman period of Polenov's activity: "He works very much, but whether he is successful or not is again terribly difficult to say; it seems to me that he looks for too much and too little in his work, and it is terribly tiring." She reported that Polenov drew one or two sketches from nature every day, and said that she "would be calmer at heart if the sketches were half as many and more in content". In April 1884, Polenov was visited in Rome by the businessman and patron Savva Mamontov, with whom the artist was well acquainted from the Abramtsevsky Circle. According to Natalia Vasilyevna, "Savva treated his work very kindly and examined his sketches sincerely and not empty-handedly", which "gave Vasily new zeal".

In May 1884, the Polenovs returned to Russia from Italy. In the summer of 1885, the artist worked at the Menshovo estate near Podolsk, where he created a full-length sketch for Christ and the Woman Taken in Adultery, executed in charcoal on canvas. The final version of the painting was completed by Polenov in 1886–1887 in Savva Mamontov's study within his residence on Sadovaya-Spasskaya Street in Moscow. In addition to his immediate family and Savva Mamontov, Polenov consulted with the artists Konstantin Korovin and Viktor Vasnetsov, as well as the physiologist Pyotr Spiro, during the painting process.

=== 15th Travelling Exhibition ===
It was anticipated that the painting Christ and the Woman Taken in Adultery would be exhibited at the 15th exhibition of the Society for Travelling Art Exhibitions (Peredvizhniki), which commenced in Saint Petersburg on 25 February 1887. Polenov departed for Saint Petersburg in advance, in mid-February, and his canvas arrived a few days after the artist. Upon its installation in the exhibition hall, it was discovered that another large-format painting on a historical subject, Boyarina Morozova by Vasily Surikov, would be exhibited at the exhibition.

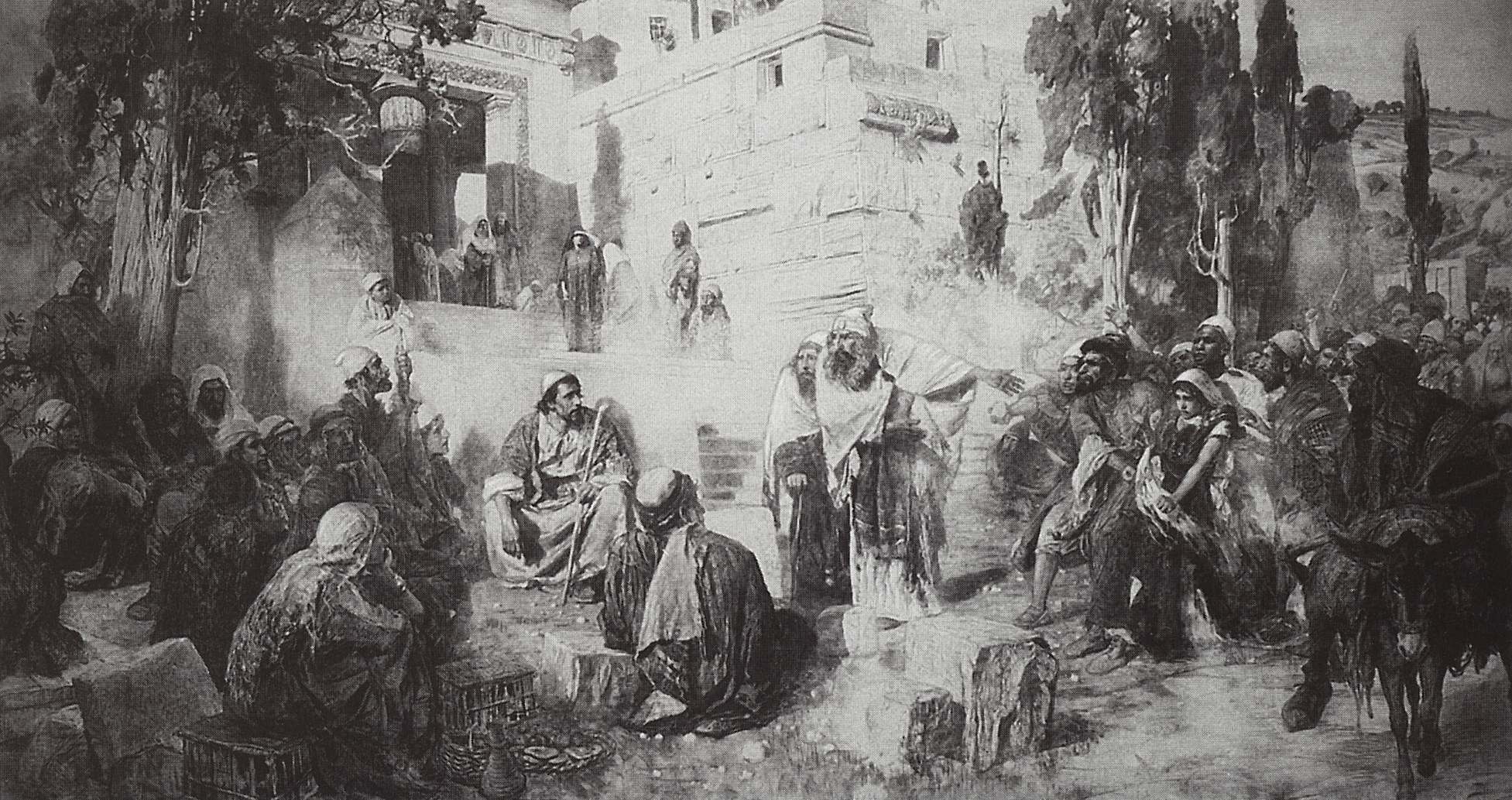
Christ and the Woman Taken in Adultery (sketch, 1885, canvas, charcoal, Polenovo)

A few days before the exhibition opened, the paintings were examined by the censor Nikitin. Apparently, this was Nikolai Vasilyevich Nikitin, an Active State Councillor, who served as the chief inspector of printers, lithographers and similar establishments in Saint Petersburg. In any case, Nikitin was reluctant to grant permission for Polenov's painting to be included in the exhibition and reported the matter to the Saint Petersburg town governor Pyotr Gresser. The latter dispatched an official with special orders, who permitted the painting to remain until the inspection of the paintings by members of the royal family, including the president of the Academy of Arts, Grand Duke Vladimir Alexandrovich, and Tsar Alexander III himself.

Shortly afterwards, Vladimir Alexandrovich visited the exhibition. He conducted a meticulous examination of the painting by Polenov (the artist himself was not present at the exhibition at that moment), expressed concern about the inadequate lighting, and concluded that "for educated people the painting is interesting for its historical character, but for the crowd it is very dangerous and can provoke all sorts of talk". Nevertheless, the painting remained on display until the Tsar's visit to the exhibition.

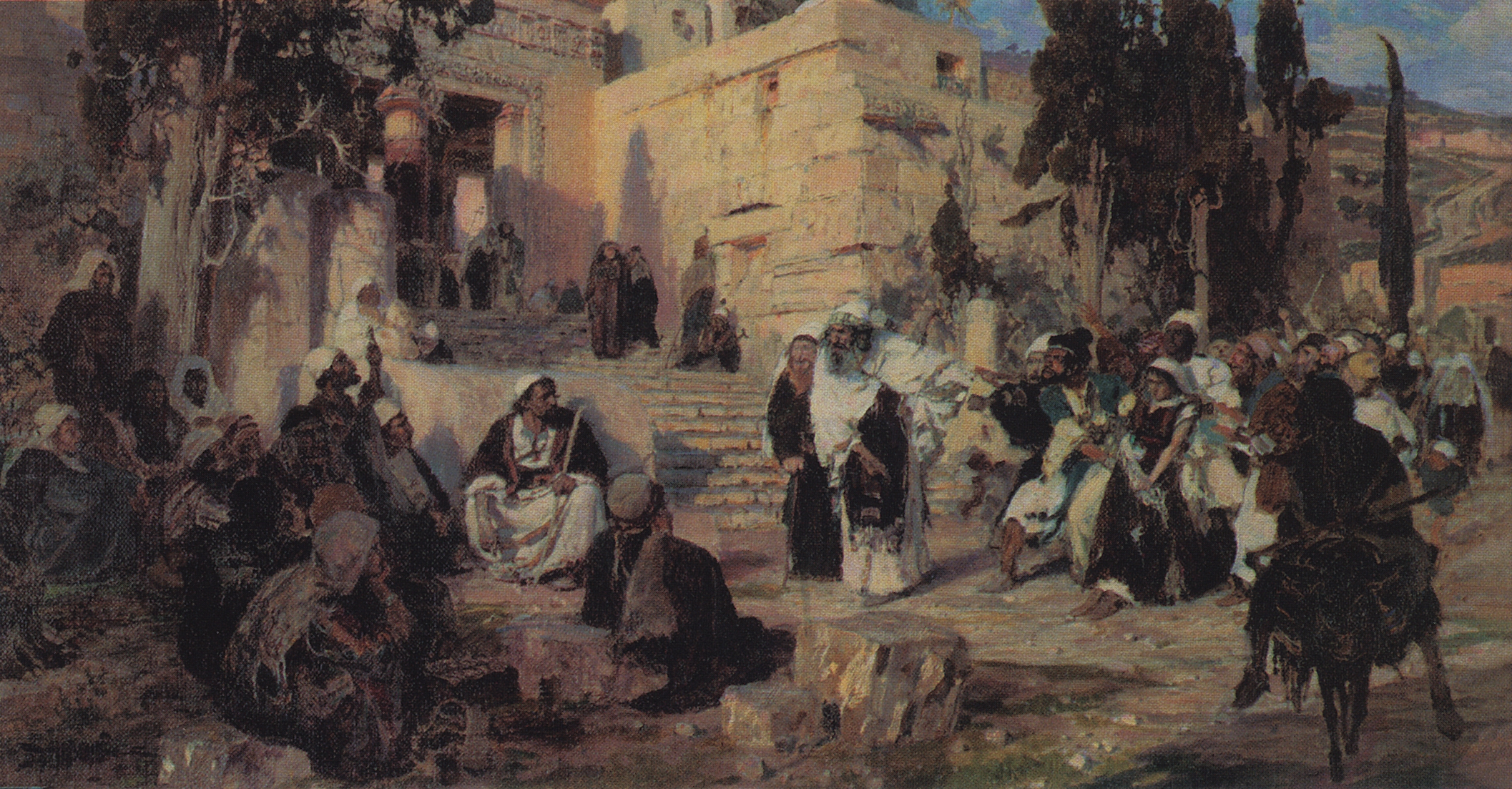
Christ and the Woman Taken in Adultery (sketch, 1885, State Tretyakov Gallery)

On the morning of the day when Alexander III was expected to arrive, the exhibition was inspected by Konstantin Pobedonostsev, the Ober-Procurator of the Most Holy Synod, who was accompanied by the town governor Pyotr Gresser. Ignoring the other paintings, the pair proceeded directly to Christ and the Woman Taken in Adultery. Describing the painting as serious and interesting, Pobedonostsev nevertheless forbade the printing of the exhibition catalogue. At two o'clock in the afternoon, Vladimir Alexandrovich arrived at the exhibition. Alexander III and his wife Maria Feodorovna arrived twenty minutes later, accompanied by the Grand Dukes George Alexandrovich and Konstantin Konstantinovich. Alexander III expressed his appreciation for the exhibition and proceeded to purchase several paintings. He eventually arrived at Polenov's canvas and spent a considerable amount of time examining it, talking with the artist. In particular, he praised the expression on Christ's face, saying that from a distance "it seemed a little old, but up close it is really wonderful".

Afterwards, Alexander III continued to inspect the exhibition and Polenov remained with his painting. Vladimir Alexandrovich approached him shortly thereafter and inquired as to whether the painting was available for purchase. Polenov responded in the affirmative. Vladimir Alexandrovich then informed the artist that the Tsar wished to purchase the canvas. Indeed, some time later, Alexander III revisited the hall where the painting was exhibited and, having once again ascertained that the painting had not been purchased by anyone, announced that he was retaining it for himself. Upon the announcement that the painting had been acquired by the Tsar, the prevailing sentiment shifted. There was no longer any question of excluding it from the exhibition; moreover, it was relocated to a more adequately illuminated area. Naturally, the exhibition catalogue was printed, in which the painting was duly included.

Prior to the exhibition, Pavel Tretyakov proposed to Polenov that he sell the painting to him for 20,000 roubles, with the understanding that the Tsar would not purchase it. However, if Alexander III wished to purchase the painting, the price could be increased to 24,000 roubles. Alexander III ultimately paid 30,000 roubles for the painting, which was higher than Tretyakov's proposed price. Nevertheless, this was not the sole factor influencing the sale. The fact that the painting was purchased by the Tsar effectively legalized it, thereby enabling it to be exhibited at the exhibition and later in a museum. Had it been prohibited by the censors – a possibility that might have arisen had Tretyakov retained ownership – it would have been impossible to exhibit it in his gallery.

=== After creation ===
Following the exhibition in Saint Petersburg, Christ and the Woman Taken in Adultery was also exhibited in Moscow, with the consent of Alexander III. Prior to the Moscow exhibition, Polenov finalized some details and changed the date of the painting's creation to 1888.

Many years after the painting's creation, in July 1925, in a letter to Vsevolod Voinov, Polenov wrote: "The painting was titled by me 'Who among you is without sin'. That was its meaning. But the censor did not allow these words to be included in the catalogue, but allowed 'Christ and the woman caught in adultery', because that was the name of other paintings, and then in the museum it was called 'The Prodigal Woman', which was completely contrary to the Gospel story, which clearly says that it is a woman who has sinned. Later, my painting could have been called 'Who among you is without sin', because that is the main idea of the painting."

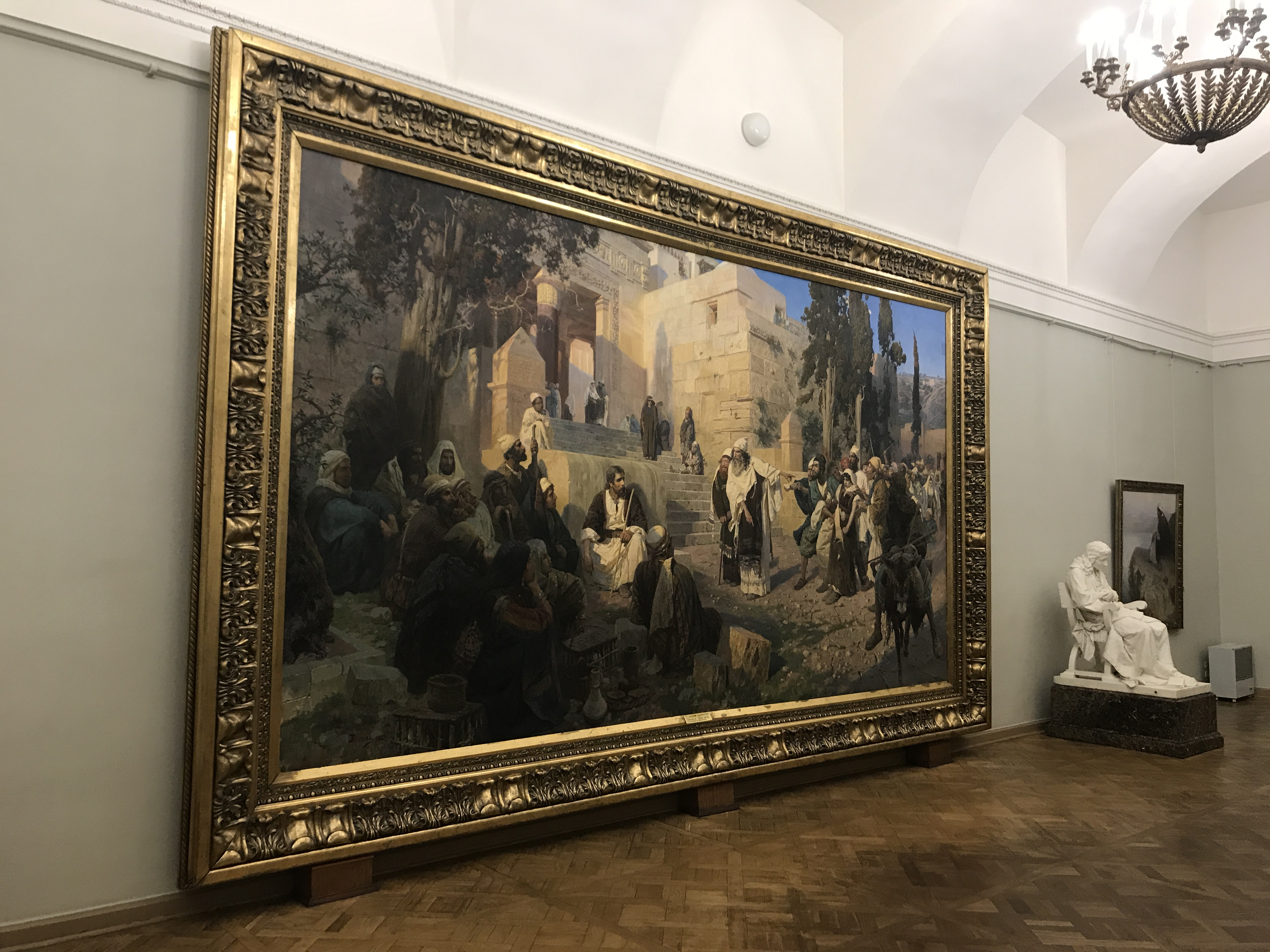
The painting on display in the Mikhailovsky Palace, the main building of the State Russian Museum

The proceeds from the sale of the painting were used to purchase a plot of land on the upper Oka River. This land was subsequently developed into a large house, which was designed by Polenov himself. This house is now the State Memorial Historical-Art and Natural Museum-Reserve of V. D. Polenov. The painting itself was originally located in the Winter Palace, but following the establishment of the Russian Museum in 1897, it was transferred to its collection.

During the Second World War, a number of paintings from the collections of the State Russian Museum were relocated to Molotov (Perm). For paintings of a considerable size, such as Christ and the Woman Taken in Adultery, wooden shafts of up to 10 metres in length were constructed, on which the paintings were wound. The restoration artists were meticulous in their approach, ensuring that the paint layer was not wrinkled, as this could potentially cause damage. The large paintings, including Christ and the Woman Taken in Adultery, were returned to the Russian Museum in April 1946. The full-size sketch for the painting, which was located at the Polenovo estate, was evacuated to Tula in 1941, along with the remainder of the museum's collection. It was returned in 1942.

The painting is currently on display at the State Russian Museum in Hall 32 of the Mikhailovsky Palace, alongside other works by Polenov.

== Description ==
The subject of the painting the story of Christ and the woman taken in adultery described in the Gospel of John. (The other three Gospels do not contain this story.) The Pharisees and Sadducees brought to Christ a woman found guilty of adultery. According to the laws of Moses, she was to be stoned, which was contrary to the preaching of humanity that Christ professed. As a result, Christ was faced with the dilemma of either breaking the laws of Moses or acting contrary to his own preaching. This episode is described in the eighth chapter of the Gospel of John:

Then each of them went home,^{8:1} while Jesus went to the Mount of Olives.^{2} Early in the morning he came again to the temple. All the people came to him and he sat down and began to teach them.^{3} The scribes and the Pharisees brought a woman who had been caught in adultery; and making her stand before all of them,^{4} they said to him, "Teacher, this woman was caught in the very act of committing adultery.^{5} Now in the law Moses commanded us to stone such women. Now what do you say?"^{6} They said this to test him, so that they might have some charge to bring against him. Jesus bent down and wrote with his finger on the ground. ^{7} When they kept on questioning him, he straightened up and said to them, "Let anyone among you who is without sin be the first to throw a stone at her."^{8} And once again he bent down and wrote on the ground.^{9} When they heard it, they went away, one by one, beginning with the elders; and Jesus was left alone with the woman standing before him.^{10} Jesus straightened up and said to her, "Woman, where are they? Has no one condemned you?"^{11} She said, "No one, sir." And Jesus said, "Neither do I condemn you. Go your way, and from now on do not sin again."

— John 7:53–8:11, NRSV

The scene is set in Herod's side chapel of the Second Temple in Jerusalem, with its wide staircase descending in steps. On the left, the slanting rays of the setting sun illuminate the stone walls of the Temple. On the steps we can see the figures of people walking and beggars sitting on the ledges in indifferent poses. On the one hand, Polenov deliberately selected the location of the scene to be the outer courtyard of the Jerusalem Temple for reasons of historical accuracy. This was because the inner courtyard, also known as the "Court of Israel", was forbidden to pagans and foreigners on pain of death, so the motley crowd could only lead the sinner to one of the outer courtyards adjoining the temple walls. Conversely, by situating the action outside the temple, Polenov got the opportunity to portray the surrounding landscape. He used sketches and impressions from his trip to the Middle East, believing that "if [nature] has changed, it has changed very little ... the sky, the mountains, the lake, the rocks, the paths, the stones, the trees, the flowers, it has all remained about the same." At the same time, the artist has acknowledged that he deviated from the "photographic accuracy" of the landscape in one detail. In the upper right-hand corner of the painting, the slope of the Mount of Olives is depicted, which could not be seen from the south-eastern corner of the portico of the Jerusalem temple. In fact, this mountain is located just behind the viewer. The deliberate introduction of this inaccuracy could be justified by the symbolic significance and importance of the Mount of Olives in the context of that period of Jesus's life.

The left half of the painting depicts a scene of tranquility, with Christ seated amidst his disciples and other listeners. It is evident that he was engaged in discourse with them, which was abruptly interrupted by the appearance of a group of people with the sinful woman. This crowd is shown on the right side of the canvas, balancing Christ's entourage in a compositional sense. The painting depicts the culmination of the Gospel narrative: a challenging question of what to do with the adulteress has just been posed; the crowd is momentarily still, awaiting Christ's response; his disciples are similarly awaiting his reaction. According to the art historian Tamara Yurova, "the canvas is filled with the image of very lively and specific people, but they are all captured in a brief moment and therefore seem suddenly frozen in their reaction to what is happening, in their expression", and the characters depicted by Polenov "are more different from each other in their outward appearance than in their inner feelings".

In the composition of the painting, the most expressive image is that of Christ, who represents "a higher stage of human consciousness, the triumph of reason and humanity". His white chiton, which shades the pallor of his sad and tired face, is well associated with the inner nature of Christ. In general, the image created by Polenov evokes a sense of fatigue and immersion in melancholy contemplation. One can discern a certain softness, a noble posture, a "freedom of gesture and pose", as well as a complex mental life, which collectively distinguish Christ from his disciples, who appear more constrained in their thoughts, feelings, and movements. The artist sought to emphasise the human nature of Christ, attempting to portray his appearance in a manner similar to that of the ordinary people around him. In the words of the writer Vladimir Korolenko, Christ is "a man – indeed, a man – strong, muscular, with a strong tan of a travelling oriental preacher".

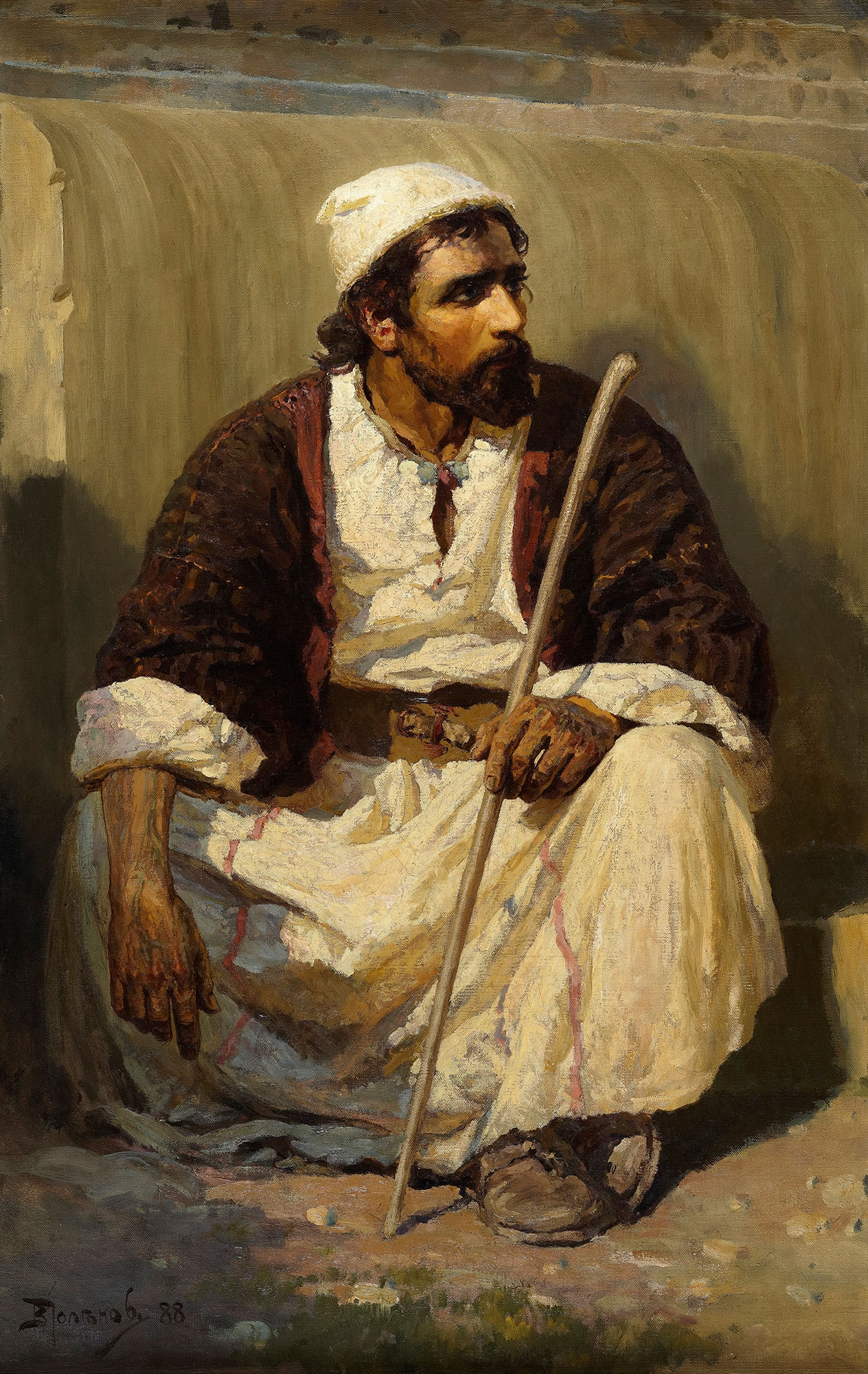
Christ (study, 1880s, Yekaterinburg Museum of Fine Arts)

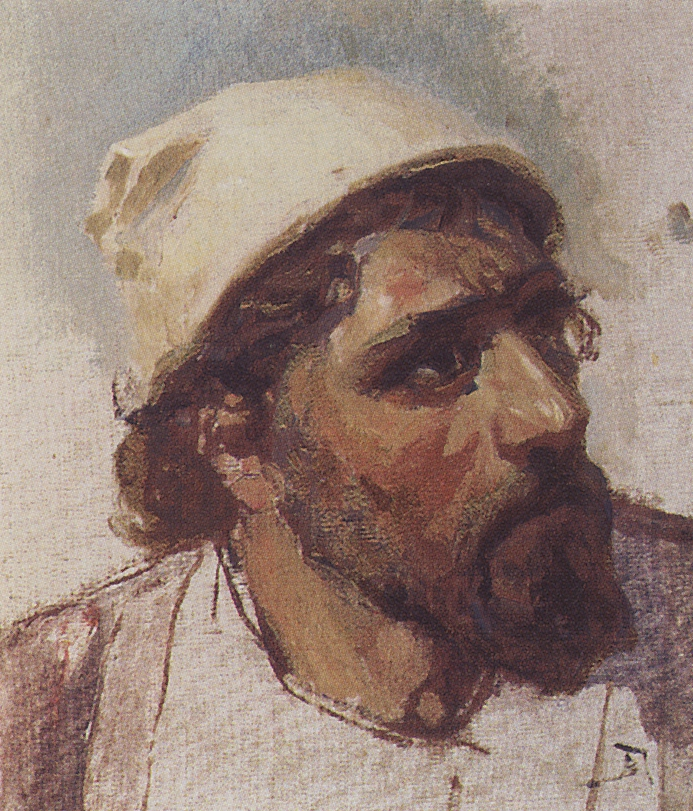
Head of Christ (study, c. 1887, Krasnodar Regional Art Museum)

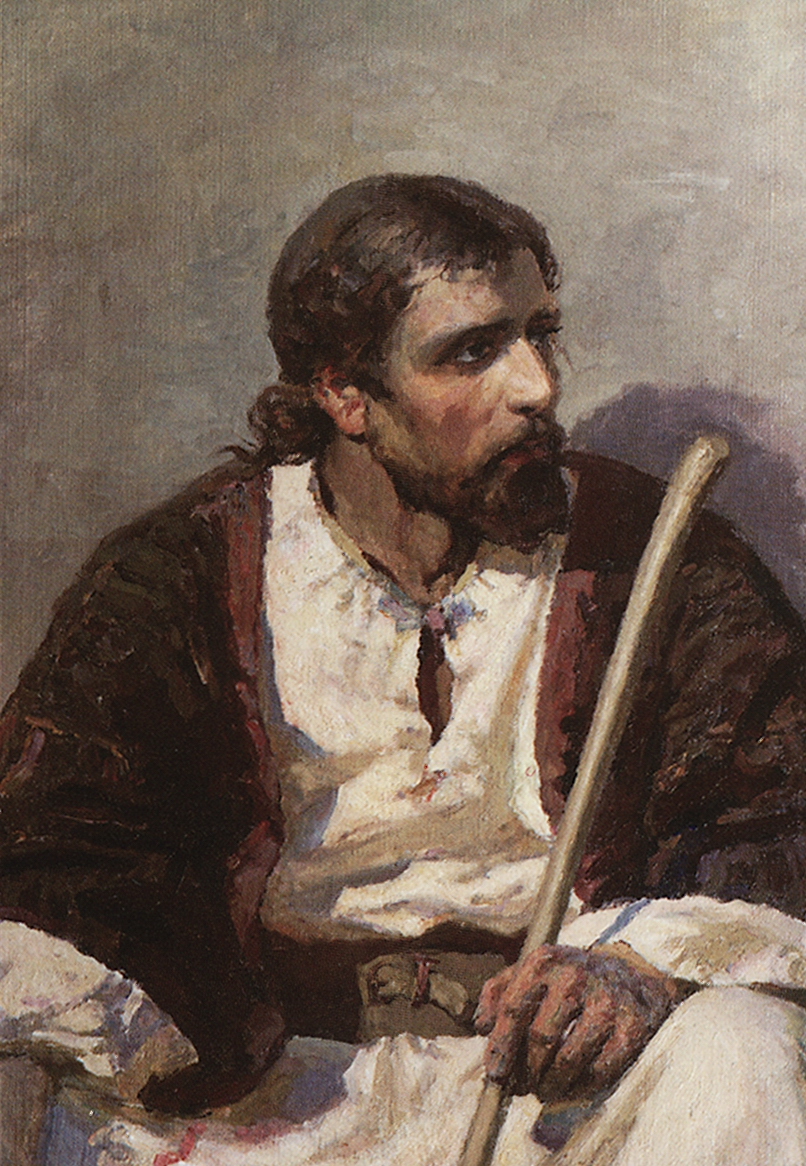
Christ (study, 1887, Polenovo)

In the majority of the sketches and studies created for the painting, Christ is depicted wearing a white cap. This was also the case in the early versions of the main canvas, but a few days before the first public showing of the painting, Polenov removed the cap, persuaded by his mother, Maria Alekseevna. Some critics perceived the non-canonicity of the image of Christ in the absence of long hair. In particular, shortly before the Travellers' exhibition, Pavel Tretyakov wrote to Polenov: "I remarked something to you, and I can still remark it afterwards, as you yourself know very well. It's a pity that Christ has short hair – this is something you do not seem to agree with." According to the writer and critic Mikhail Chekhov, Polenov painted the face of Christ from the artist Isaac Levitan.

Seated next to Christ are his disciples, including Peter, John, James, and Judas. The figures of the Pharisee and Sadducee are positioned at the forefront of the crowd, in which the sinner is situated. The Pharisee is depicted as the most assertive, and he appears to be the individual who poses the question to Christ. To his left, the red-haired, well-fed Sadducee is depicted with a snide smile. Despite their enmity, in this episode they are united against Christ.

According to Polenov, and with the assistance of his wife Natalia Vasilievna, the art critic Alexander Sobolev produced a detailed description of the painting, which was subsequently published in Russkiye Vedomosti in 1887 and in a separate brochure. According to this description, the boy seated on the ledge of the temple stairs is Mark, one of the future evangelists. To the right of Christ is John, and to the left is James, with Peter leaning on his staff behind him. In the same row as Peter are Andrew, Philip and James, son of Alphaeus, and in the second row are Judas, Cleopas and Matthew. The man with his face half-covered, standing by the cypress tree behind Christ's disciples, is Nicodemus the Pharisee, one of Christ's secret disciples. In the foreground, by the wicker baskets, is Mary, the mother of Mark, with her maid Rhoda beside her. The elderly man leaving the temple with the younger man is the Pharisee Gamaliel, a learned rabbi who would, following the execution of Jesus, intercede in the Sanhedrin on behalf of his disciples-apostles. The woman depicted on the steps of the temple is the widow from the Gospels, whom Jesus described as "more beautiful than marvellous slabs of marble". The man on the right side of the painting is Simon of Cyrene, who is to carry the cross for Christ's crucifixion to Golgotha in the future.

== Studies, sketches and reproductions ==
During his many years of work on the subject associated with the canvas Christ and the Woman Taken in Adultery, Polenov produced more than 150 drawings, studies, sketches and versions of the painting.

The Polenovo Estate Museum houses one of Polenov's earliest sketches of the subject, created in 1873. Additionally, the museum's collection includes a sketch from 1884 (oil, 23 × 45 cm), which was transferred from France in the 1980s, and a full-length sketch from 1885, executed in charcoal on canvas (307 × 585 cm).

The State Tretyakov Gallery houses an oil sketch for Christ and the Woman Taken in Adultery (1876, wood, oil, 22.2 × 34.7 cm, inv. 10581), which was acquired from Nikolay Krymov in 1930. Additionally, there is a later sketch from 1885 (canvas, oil, 26 × 48 cm, inv. 11142), which was previously owned by Ilya Ostroukhov and transferred in 1929 from the Ostroukhov Museum. Another sketch, dated 1884, belongs to the Kharkiv Art Museum.

The State Russian Museum houses 27 studies for the painting. Four additional studies are held by the Tretyakov Gallery. Several studies are part of the collection of the Polenovo Museum. At least two studies for this painting were in the collection of the Rumyantsev Museum. After the museum's dissolution in 1924, one study (Christ, 1880s, oil on canvas, 114 × 75 cm) was transferred to the Yekaterinburg Museum of Fine Arts, and another (Head of an Old Man, 1883, oil on canvas, 27 × 22 cm) was transferred to the Omsk Regional Museum of Fine Arts named after M. A. Vrubel. The sketches for the painting are also held in a number of other museums and private collections.

A number of reduced author's reproductions of the painting with the same name exist. One of these, undated, is held in a private collection in Moscow. The other, dated 1888 and created with the help of Sergei Korovin, is in the V. P. Sukachev Irkutsk Regional Art Museum (canvas, oil, 150 × 266 cm).

The catalogue of the State Russian Museum notes the existence of another author's reproduction, dated 1907, which was exhibited at the Russian Art Exhibition in the United States in 1924. It is likely that this is the same painting which was sold in November 2011 at Bonhams' Russian auction in London for £4,073,250, or approximately $5,381,742 (oil on canvas, 118 × 239 cm), under the title He That Is Without Sin Among You. Although the painting sold at the auction is dated 1908, it was written about as having participated in the 1924 exhibition in New York City, where it was acquired by Charles Richard Crane. Prior to the auction, in October 2011, the artist's reproduction was exhibited at the Tretyakov Gallery as part of a preview of the lots.

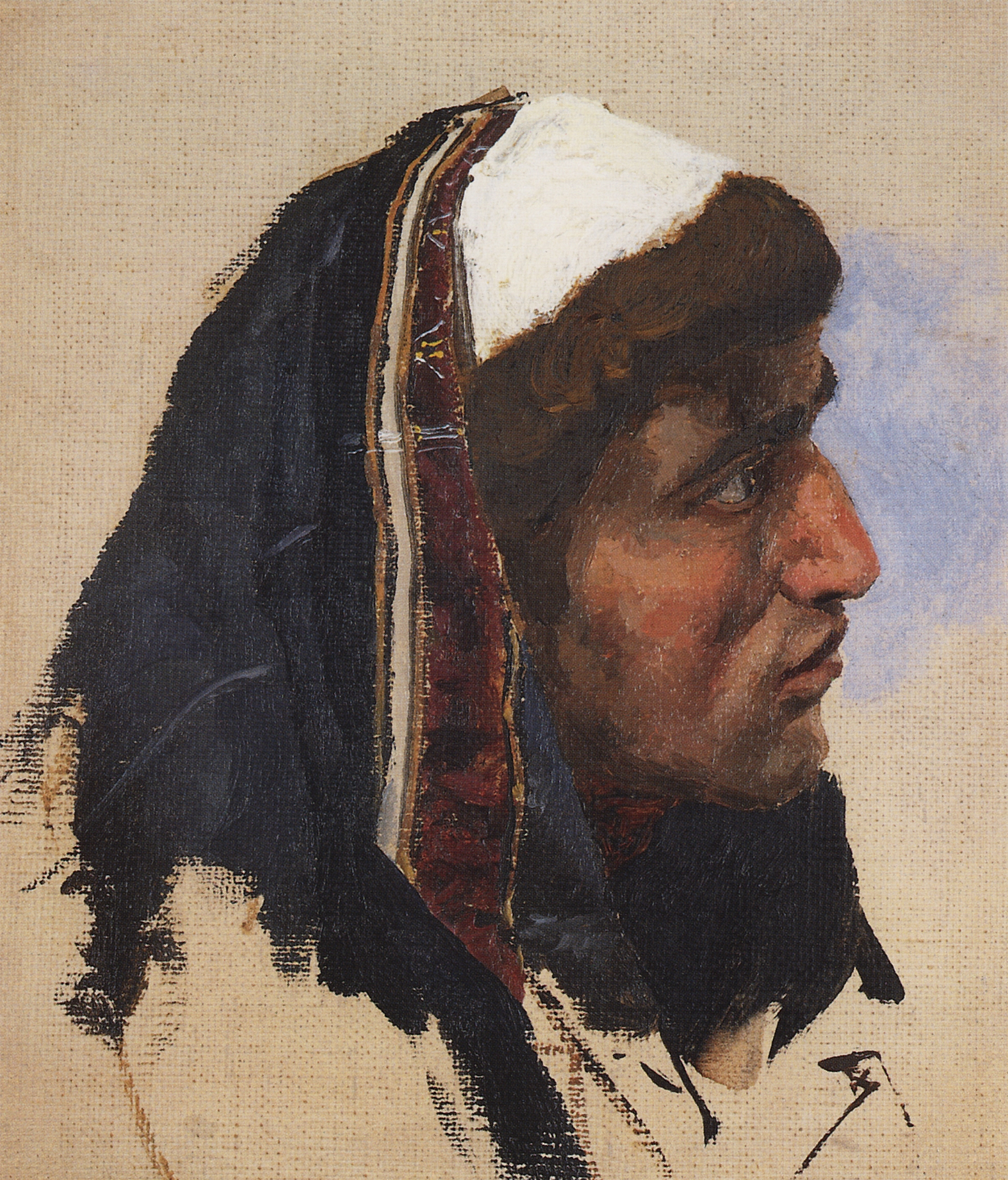
Head of a Young Man in a Blue Coverlet (study, 1880s, State Russian Museum)

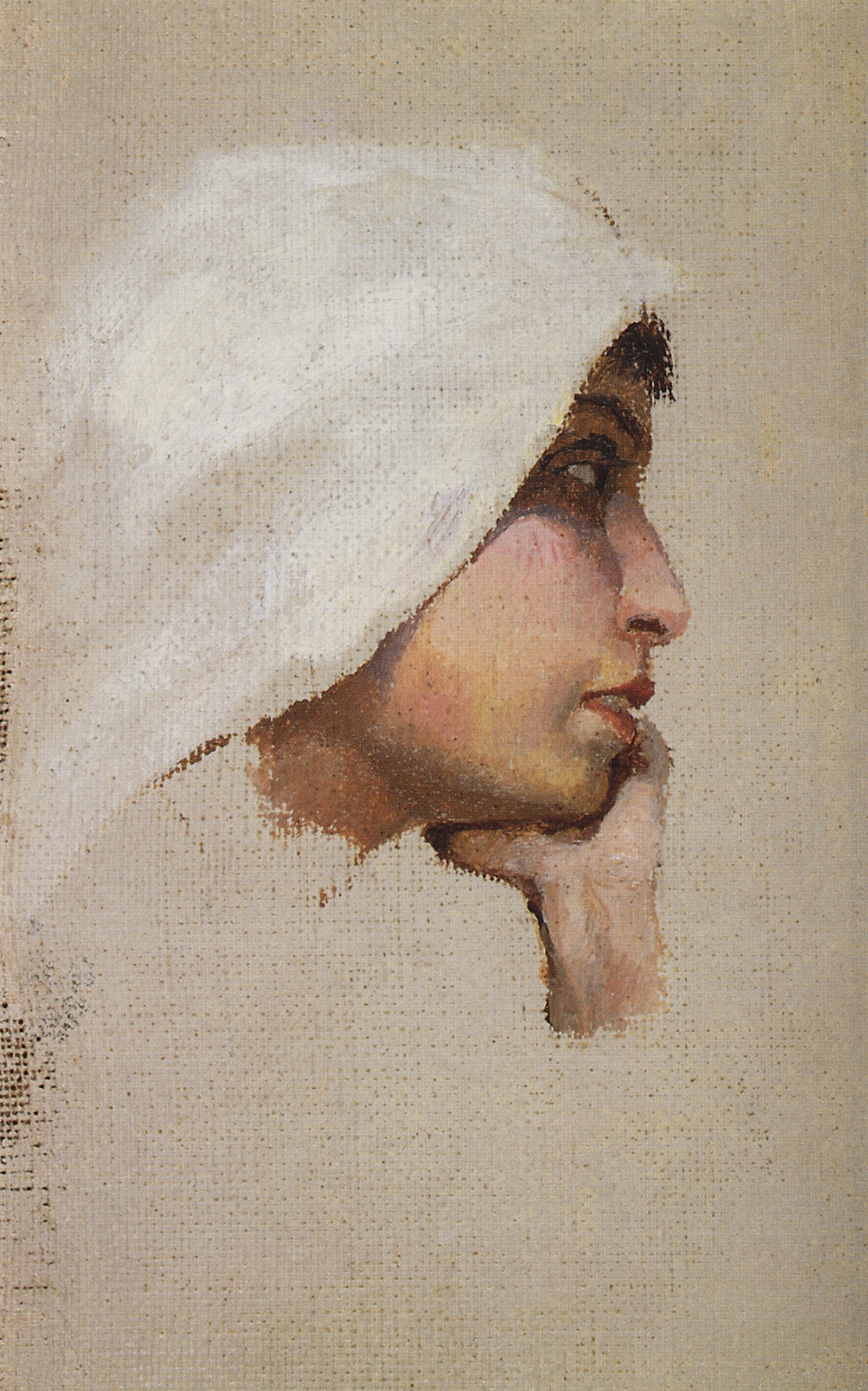
Head of a Young Woman in a White Coverlet (study, 1880s, State Russian Museum)

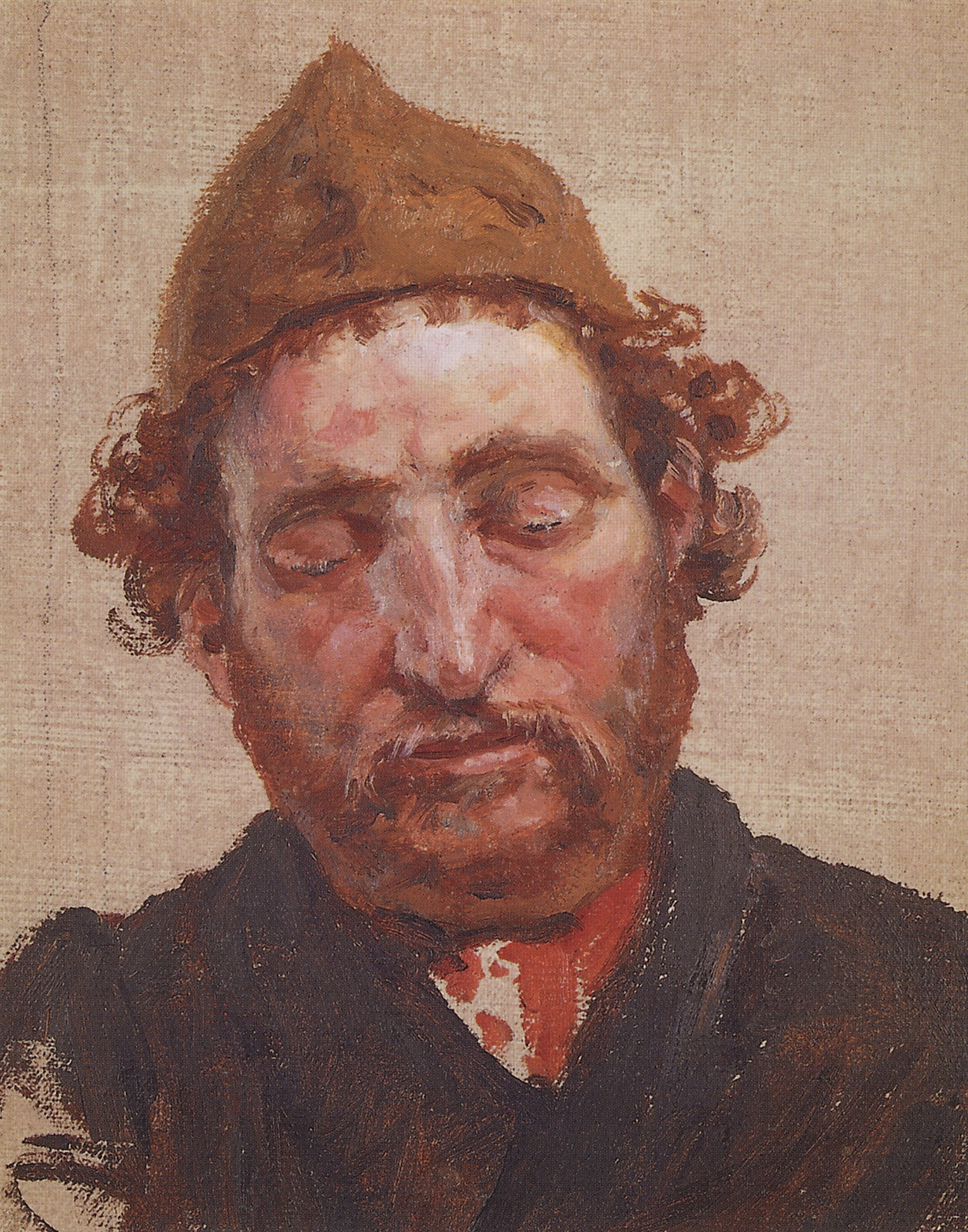
Head of a Red-haired Man in a Yellow Yarmulke (study, 1880s, State Russian Museum)

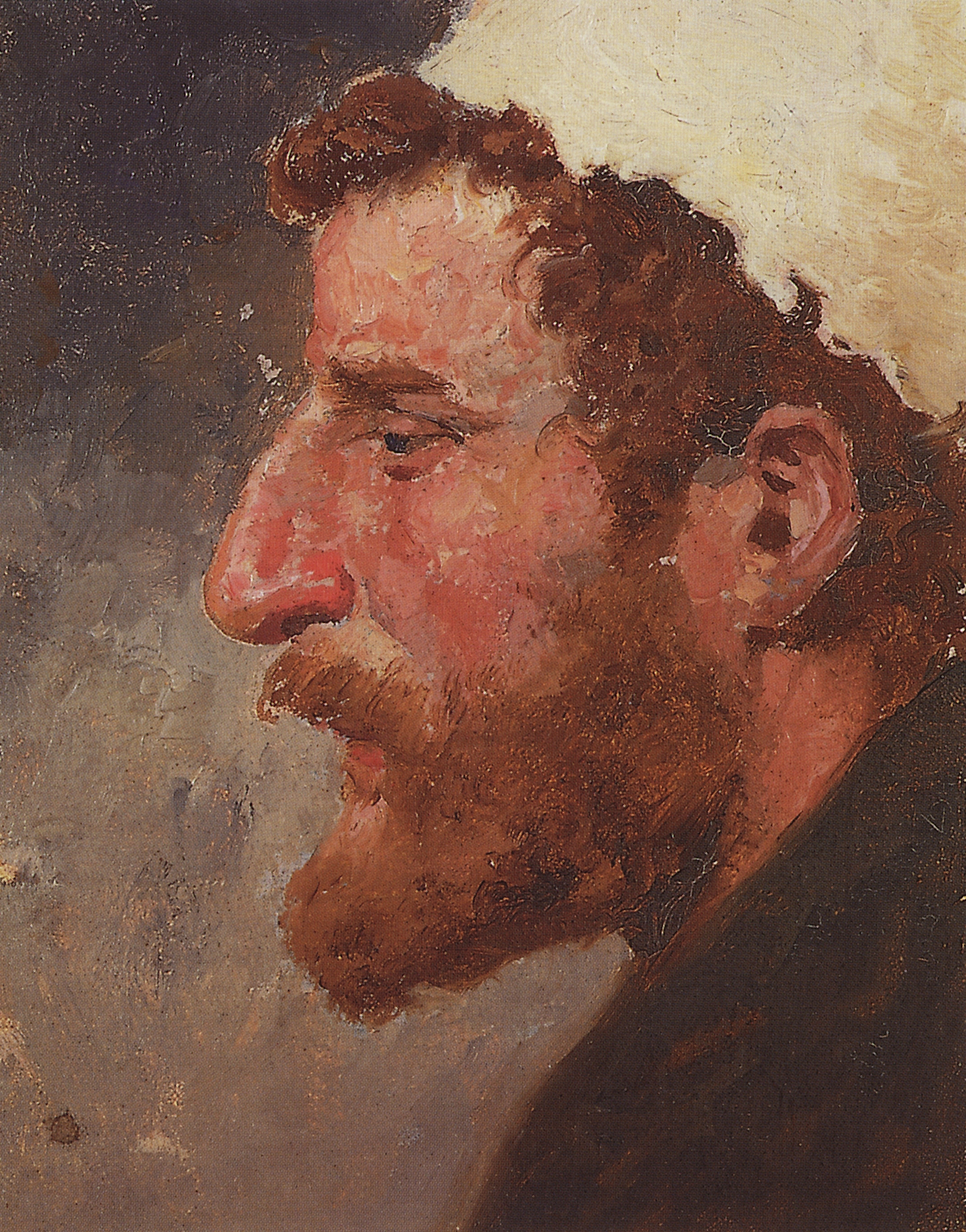
Head of a Red-haired Man in Profile (study, 1880s, State Russian Museum)

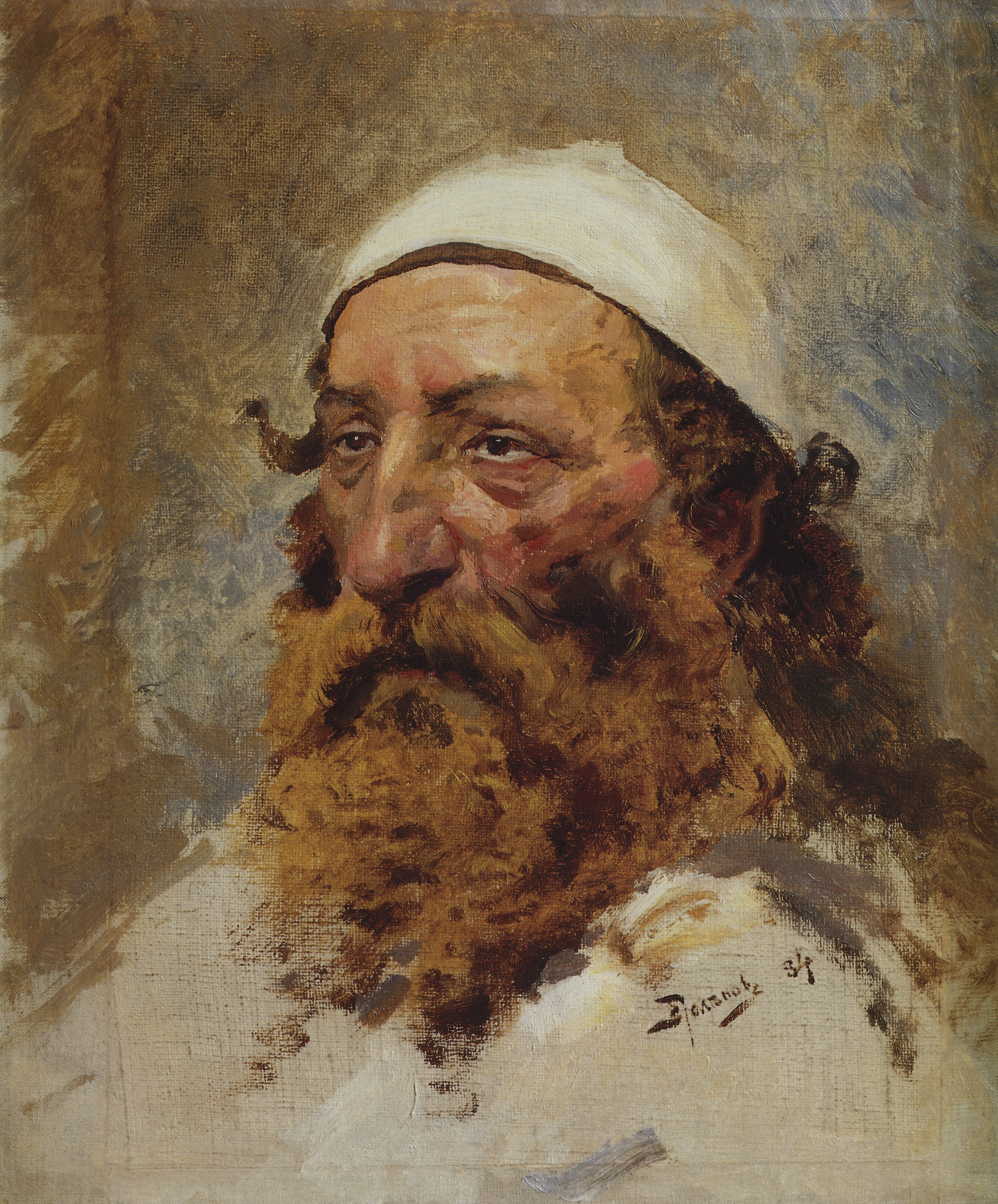
Head of a Jew (study, 1884, State Russian Museum)

== Reviews and criticism ==
In his article The Exhibition of the Peredvizhniki, published on 1 March 1887, in the Novosty I Birzhevaya Gazeta, the art critic Vladimir Stasov devoted only a few sentences to Christ and the Woman Taken in Adultery. He noted that a detailed account of this significant work would require a separate article; however, he never wrote it. Stasov noted that in working on this painting Polenov "approached his task very carefully, travelled to Palestine, studied on the spot the architecture, the local types of people and nature, the light effects"; all of this produced "very interesting and powerful results". Stasov went on to write: "I will say in passing that part of Herod's temple, still extant, elegant pillars with ornamented capitals in the corner of the temple, the steps leading down from the temple, where the famous Gospel scene takes place, everything is colourful and elegant, illuminated by the bright Palestinian sun. In general, Polenov remained a graceful, elegant painter, as we have known him for a long time, since the beginning of his career in 1871. But to this he also added great skill and picturesqueness in the transfer of landscape". The writer and critic Vsevolod Garshin in his Notes on Art Exhibitions, published in March 1887 in the Saint Petersburg magazine Severny Vestnik, praised Polenov's painting, in which, in his words, "there is not a single [instance of] what they call drapery, it is all a real dress, clothes; and the artist, who has closely studied the East, has managed to dress his heroes in such a way that they really wear clothes, live in them, rather than put them on for scaffolding or posing in front of a painter".

In his article Two Paintings, published in 1887 in Russkie Vedomosti, the writer and publicist Vladimir Korolenko provides a detailed analysis of the depiction of Christ in Polenov's painting. He wrote that "at first glance at a painting it is as if you do not notice its main figure", but this is only a superficial impression caused by a sudden feeling of inconsistency with established ideas. "The more you gaze at this remarkable figure, with its physical strength instead of its ascetic half-airiness, with its carelessly dropped hand on its knee, with all that unnoticed fatigue of a weary but strong man, and above all with that remarkable expression of face, the more the initial feeling is replaced by wonder, respect, love." According to Korolenko, he saw in the image of Christ "a remarkable success of artistic realism".

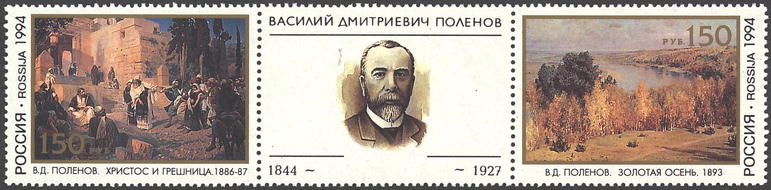
Christ and the Woman Taken in Adultery on a se-tenant (Russian Post, 1994)

The artist Yeghishe Tadevosyan described Polenov's Christ and the Woman Taken in Adultery as "a bright, cheerful, hot-sunny work", and called it "a daring challenge to religious prudes".

The art historian Aleksei Fedorov-Davydov posited that, having rejected the tenets of official religion and ecclesiasticism, Polenov in his work had offered a realistic interpretation of both Christ and the entirety of the Gospel narrative. Nevertheless, he noted that "the depiction of a religious subject as a scene of alive real life becomes, so to speak, an end in itself". According to Fedorov-Davydov, such abstractness and lack of content were "akin to the formal understanding of the subject in academism". The realism in Polenov's painting is primarily evident in the form, or the means of depiction, rather than in the content, and that is why "he could get along with the traditions of academic historical painting". Nevertheless, in comparison with the painting Christ and the Sinner by the academic painter Henryk Siemiradzki, Fedorov-Davydov asserted that Polenov's work was "more serious, noble, substantial and artistic". In his opinion, "Polenov's painting is the most significant and serious" among the attempts to revive large-format academic historical painting.

== Bibliography ==
- Бахревский, В.А. (1989). Виктор Васнецов. Жизнь замечательных людей. Moscow: Молодая гвардия. ISBN 5-235-00367-5.
- Гаршин, В.М. (1938). "Заметки о художественных выставках". Сочинения. Leningrad: Художественная литература. pp. 362–375.
- Климов, П.Ю. (2001). "Император Александр III и русская религиозная живопись". Русские Государи — Покровители Православия: Материалы VIII Российской Научной Конференции, Посвящённой Памяти Святителя Макария (compendium). Moscow: Терра: 436–453.
- Копшицер, М.И. (2010). Поленов. Жизнь замечательных людей. Moscow: Молодая гвардия. ISBN 978-5-235-03383-2.
- Короленко, В.Г. (1955). "Две картины". Собрание сочинений в 10 томах. Vol. 8. Moscow: ГИХЛ. pp. 293–305.
- Королёва, С. (2010). Василий Дмитриевич Поленов. Великие художники. Vol. 31. Moscow: Директмедиа Паблишинг и Комсомольская правда.
- Левитан, И.И. (1956). Письма, документы, воспоминания. А.А. Фёдоров-Давыдов. Moscow: Искусство.
- Леонов, А.И. (1971). Русское искусство: очерки о жизни и творчестве художников. Vol. 2. Moscow: Искусство.
- Лосева, А.С. (2012). "Впечатления В. Д. Поленова о Египте в контексте воспоминаний русских паломников и путешественников второй половины XlX века" (PDF). Искусствознание (3–4): 300–321.
- Пастон, Э.В. (1991). Василий Дмитриевич Поленов. Русские живописцы XIX века. Saint Petersburg: Художник РСФСР. ISBN 5-7370-0227-6.
- Пастон, Э.В. (2000). Поленов. Moscow: Белый город. ISBN 5-7793-0225-1.
- Петинова, Е.Ф. (2001). Русские художники XVIII — начала XX века. Saint Petersburg: Аврора. ISBN 978-5-7300-0714-7.
- Поленов, Ф.Д. (1988). "В. Поленов. Христос и грешница". Юный Художник (11): 13–17.
- Рогинская, Ф.С. (1989). Товарищество передвижных художественных выставок. Moscow: Искусство.
- Соболев, А.К. (1887). Евангельская эпоха в картине В. Д. Поленова "Христос и грешница": Опыт художественной критики и пояснение картины. Moscow: Типография А. И. Мамонтова и К°.
- Стасов, В.В. (1952). Избранные сочинения: живопись, скульптура, музыка. Vol. 3. Moscow: Искусство.
- Фёдоров-Давыдов, А.А. (1986). Русский пейзаж XVIII — начала XX века. Moscow: Советский художник.
- Юрова, Т.В. (1972). Василий Дмитриевич Поленов. Moscow: Искусство.
- Государственная Третьяковская галерея – каталог собрания [State Tretyakov Gallery: Catalogue of the Collection] (in Russian). Vol. 4: Живопись второй половины XIX века, книга 2, Н–Я. Я.В. Брук, Л.И. Иовлева. Moscow: Красная площадь. 2006. ISBN 5-900743-22-5.
- Государственный Русский музей. Живопись, XVIII — начало XX века (каталог) [State Russian Museum: Painting, 18th – Early 20th Centuries (Catalogue)] (in Russian). Leningrad: Аврора and Искусство. 1980.
