= Toropovo =

Toropovo may refer to:

- Toropovo, Nizhny Novgorod Oblast, a village in Nizhny Novgorod Oblast, Russia
- Toropovo, Tula Oblast, a village in Tula Oblast, Russia
- Toropovo, name of several other rural localities in Russia
