= Chermoshnya =

Chermoshnya may refer to:

- Chermoshnya, Kaluga Oblast, a village in Kaluga Oblast, Russia
- Chermoshnya, Tula Oblast, a village in Tula Oblast, Russia
