= Natalia Polenova =

Russian museum director (b. 1975)

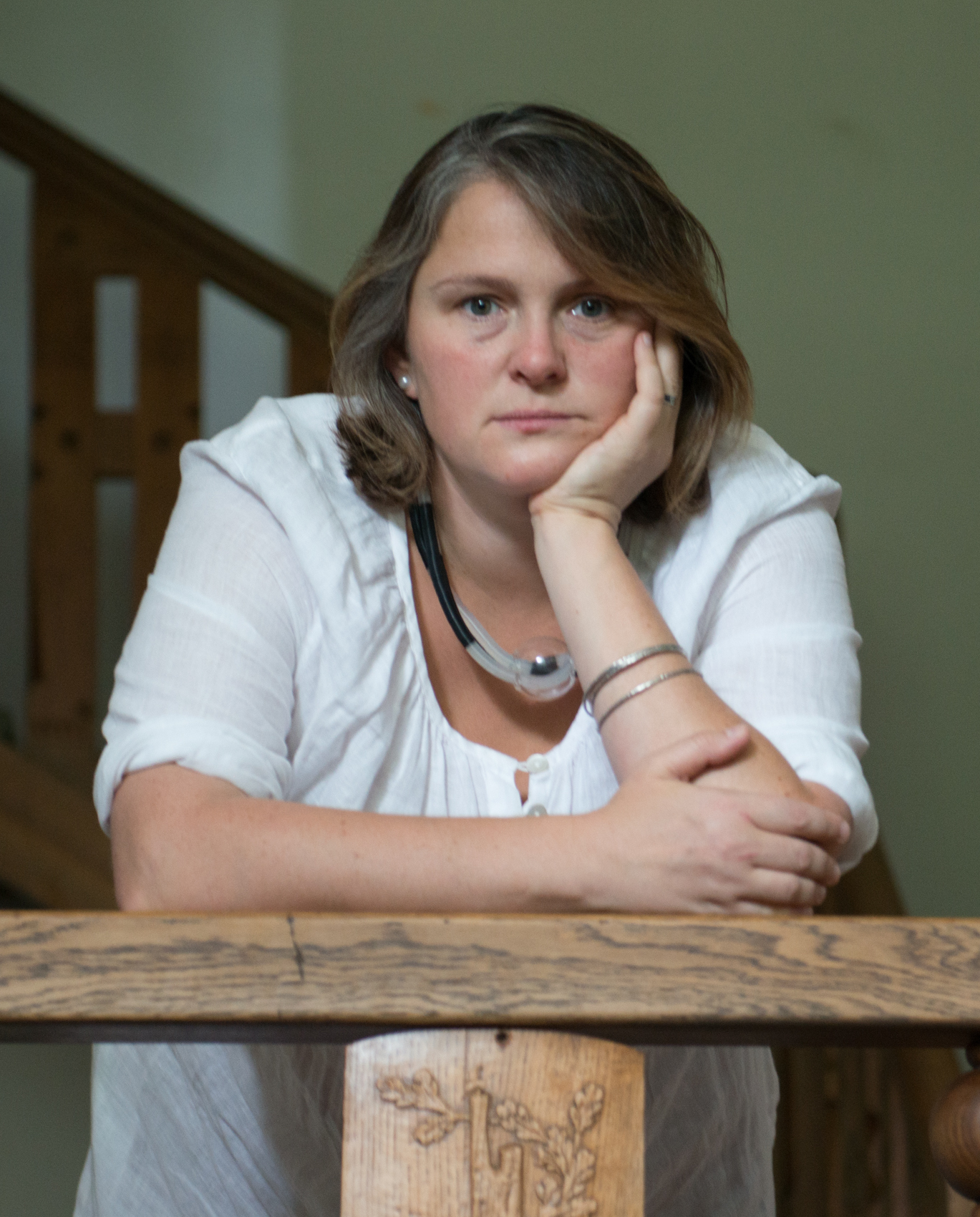

Natalia Fyodorovna Polenova (Russian: Наталья Фёдоровна Поленова; born July 12, 1975, Moscow) is a Russian museum expert and the director of the State Memorial of History, Art and Natural Museum Reserve — Vasily Dmitrievich Polenov since 2011. She is an expert on Russian painting from the late 19th and early 20th centuries, a specialist of French culture and a member of the International Council of Museums (ICOM Russia). In 2018, she was awarded the title of Honoured Functionary of Culture of the Russian Federation in Tula.

== Family ==
Natalia Polenova is the great grand-daughter of the Russian realist artist Vasily Polenov, member of the Itinerants (Peredvizhniki movement), and the great grand-niece of Elena Polenova, watercolorist and illustrator. Following in her parents' footsteps, Fiodor Polenov and Natalya Gramolina, and in that of her grandparents before them, Natalya Polenova takes over the management of the museum POLENOVO (usual name of the State Memorial of History, Art and Natural Museum Reserve Vasily Dmitrievitch Polenov) in 2011. She thus carries on the legacy of the founder artist and of the family traditions. She is married to the Russian poet Yuri Kublanovsky, who lived as a political exile for numerous years in France and who was awarded with the literary prize Soljenitsyne in 2003. She is mother of two children.

== Studies ==
Polenova studied at the Faculty of Sociology at the Lomonosov Moscow State University. She graduated in 1998 with a specialization in Public Relations. In addition to this, she took a course at the Gelos Auction House, an association specializing in antiquities, entitled "'Certification, identification and restoration" (1999). Subsequently she studied with the auction house Christie's on "European Art Market and History of the French Art" (Paris, 2006-2007), earned a Master in Museology at the École du Louvre (Paris, 2007-2010). Between 2010 and 2014, while working on her thesis, she continued her academic expertise at INSEAD with the "Team Management" course.

Besides Russian, her mother tongue, Natalya Polenova perfectly masters French.

== Professional activities ==
Since 2000, she works as consultant and art critic, as well as writes articles for Russian press and art magazines, including the newspaper The Art Newspaper Russia and also Музей (Museum), Интерьер+дизайн (Interior+design), Антиквариат (Antiques), etc.

In 2010, in the context of the crossed year France-Russia, she takes part in the organisation of French-Russian programs, including the project "Russian artists and French publishing houses - end of the 19th, beginning of the 20th century art the Salon Livre Paris. She works on the catalog of the eponym exhibition held at the Bibliothèque Sainte-Geneviève in Paris. She also takes part in the organisation of the festival Étonnants Voyageurs in Saint-Malo.

Since her official appointment as the director of the museum-house Polenovo after her mother in 2011, Natalya Polenova shows a vivid interest in perpetuating family traditions, while seeking to establish international partnerships in order to transmit Vasily Polenov's legacy beyond Russian borders.

She is committed to the protection and preservation of the collections and of the domain's atmosphere, and has stimulated research and creation activities.

Natalya Polenova called herself a “curator and a cultural promoter”, always trying to match “innovation and tradition, modernity and the pre-revolutionary culture”. Her main goal is to transform the House Museum into “a powerful cultural and educational center, catching up with European institutions”.

== Career ==
As the director of the Polenova Museum, Natalya Polenova develops its international activity, while also leaning on the Association Vassily Polenov PRÉSENTATION DE L’ASSOCIATION, created in Paris in 2007.

In 2012, under the direction of Polenova, the program of international creative residences in Polenovo was launched under the name A-I-R (standing for Artists In Residence), which welcomes every year painters, poets, writers or philosophers, with the aim to support them in their creative work.

In 2013, the museum signed a cooperation agreement with the George Watts Gallery (Guildford, UK). From this partnership born out the first monographic exhibition of Elena Polenova in a foreign country.

In 2014, in the context of the crossed year Great Britain/Russia, Natalya Polenova organises a series of conferences on the movement "Arts and Craft at the end of the XIXth century", notably at the department of Art History of Cambridge University and at the Courtauld Institute of Art.

In 2015, she involves herself in the creation of the international network of the house-museums The Artist's Studio Museum Network, and actively contributes to its expansion by encouraging several Russian museums to take part in. The same year, a partnership was settled with the mayor's office of the town of Veules-les-Roses (Normandy, France) resulting in the opening in July 2015 of a Square named after Vasily Polenov in this town.

Another important event was the unveiling, on 6 October 2018, in Paris, at Montmartre, 31 rue Véron, of a commemorative plaque to honour Russian painters of the itinerant movement, Vasily Polenov and Ilya Repin.

Since 2016, on the 21st of every year, she organises the "Fête de la Musique" (Feast of Music) in Polenovo.

She also initiates the tradition of international artistic festivals taking place on the domain. The first edition, in 2016, was dedicated to the Francophonie, in the context of the Cross Russian-French Cultural Year. In 2017, many artists are reunited around the topic of the Holy Land and in 2018, on that of Italy. In 2019, the festival is dedicated to the topic of music in the works of Vasily Polenov, in order to commemorate the 175th artist's birthday.

In 2018 and 2019, Natalya Polenova organises exhibitions on the history of the Polenovo domain during the stalinist era, with the historian Gabriel Superfin. Realised on the domain, these exhibitions are entitled 37/101. A new edition is planned for autumn 2020.

Natalya Polenova produced the following documentaries:

- Le cercle évangélique de Vassily Polenov (Russia, Israel, United States, directed by Elena Yakovich, 2015, 44 minutes long).
- Polenov (concept of the movie by Alexander Chatalov, director Sergeï Garkavy, 2020, 1: 28 long)

After the premieres on the Russian TV channel Culture, several projections are organised in the United-States, in Great-Britain, in Israel, in France, in Germany.

In 2019, in the context of the celebrations of Vasily Polenov's 175th birthday, the museum lends 80 artworks for a great retrospective exhibition "Polenov", curated at the Tretiakov Gallery in Moscow from 17 October 2019 to 16 February 2020.

From the beginning of the quarantine caused by the Covid-19 pandemic, Natalya Polenova launches the project polenovostream, an online channel offering short videos on curious objects preserved in the museum.

== Publications support ==
Natalya Polenova directed the publication or contributed to the publication of the following works:

- Venise : Paradis retrouvé, 11 Russian poets brought together in a book illustrated by Ekaterina Margolis 2011 (an artistic and poetic collection, in Russian and Italian, as part of the Crossed Year Russia / Italy, edited by the Association Vasily Polenov, 2011)
- Tolstoï, Leo. Histoires pour enfants, with drawings by Natalia Parain-Chelpanova (published in the context of the Crossed year Russia/France, Iasnaïa Poliana, 2012)
- Chevalier de la beauté by Tatiana Mojenok-Ninin (Association Vassily Polenov in collaboration with the French publishing house Point de vues [archive], ISBN 978-2-915548-87-7, 2013) - is the first monograph about Vasily Polenov in French.
- Why The Bear Has No Tail And Other Russian Folk Tales (Editions «Fontanka [archive]», ISBN 978-1-906257-14-9, 2014)
- A Russian Fairy Tale. The Art And Craft Of Elena Polenova, catalogue of the exhibition of the same name that took place at the Watts Gallery, edited by Natalia Murray (in English, Editions Watts Gallery, ISBN 978-0-9548230-4-7, 2014)
- Vassily Polenov et la France, catalogue of the exhibition of the same name that took place at the Polenovo museum (in Russian and in French, 2016)
- Maison pour un ambulant, catalogue of works created by the artist Benjamin Bozonnet and the writer Olivier Bleys in 2013, during their residency in Polenovo, part of which was exhibited at the Parisian Gallery Montparnos (EEditions Méroé, ISBN 979-10-95715-04-7, 2017)
- Vassily Polenov sur la Terre Sainte, catalogue of the exhibition of the same name that took place at the Polenovo museum (in Russian, 2017)
- 37/101. 1ère Partie. Prologue, catalogue of the exhibition of the same name that took place at the Polenovo museum (in Russian, ISBN 978-5-903877-24-9, 2017)
- Crépuscule d’impressioniste, collection of poetry by Yuri Koublanovski (translated into French by Christine Zeytounian, Editions Le Castor Astral), ISBN 979-10-278-0149-7, 2018)
- Les impressions italiennes des Polenov, catalogue of the exhibition of the same name that took place at the Polenovo museum (in Russian and in Italian, ISBN 978-5-903877-26-3, 2018)
- 37/101. Deuxième partie. Le phare de la vie, catalogue of the exhibition of the same name that took place at the Polenovo museum (ISBN 978-5-903877-30-0, 2019)
- The Story of Synko-Filipko and Other Russian Folk Tales (Editions «Fontanka [archive]», ISBN 978-1-906257-26-2, 2019).

Natalya Polenova wrote essays on the cultural life of her country and of foreign countries, as well as publishes interviews of illustrious people from the art world:

- (ru) Philippe Durey : «Le Louvre comme École d'art.» Natalya Polenova. Musée, n ° 1, 2011
- (ru) Fréderic Mitterrand : « Le but de l'art n'est pas du tout la compétition ». Natalya Polenova et Alexander Chatalov. Kommersant, 16 juillet 2012.
- (ru) Michelle Collardel : « Je regarde l'avenir avec prudence et optimisme ». Natalya Polenova. Musée, n ° 8, 2012.
- (ru) Perdita Hunt : « Notre coopération est pertinente et fructueuse. » Natalya Polenova. Musée, 2013.
- (ru) Cicéro Antonio Fonseca de Almeida : « Musée et société : dans l'unité indissoluble ». Natalya Polenova. Musée, n ° 1, 2015.
- (ru) François Taillade : « Comprendre l'art contemporain passe par la communication. » Natalya Polenova et Alexander Chatalov. Artguide, 20 janvier 2016
- (ru) «Art Basel à Hong Kong : salon de l’énergie ». Natalya Polenova. The Art Newspaper Russia, 3 avril 2019
- (ru) Alex Lachmann : " Je vis comme ça maintenant : si je veux – je vends, et si je veux – je ne vends pas ". Natalya Polenova. The Art Newspaper Russia, № 76, septembre 2019

== Awards ==
- Bronze medal for the "rayonnement Culturel de la Renaissance Française" (Cultural influence of French Renaissance) (2016).
- Winner of the Pitschulin Prize of the Russian magazine "Mir Muzya" "for the best museum initiative" (2017).
- Honorary title of Distinguished Worker of Culture of the Russian Federation (2018).
