= Zaoksky (urban-type settlement) =

Zaoksky Заокский
- Urban-type settlement
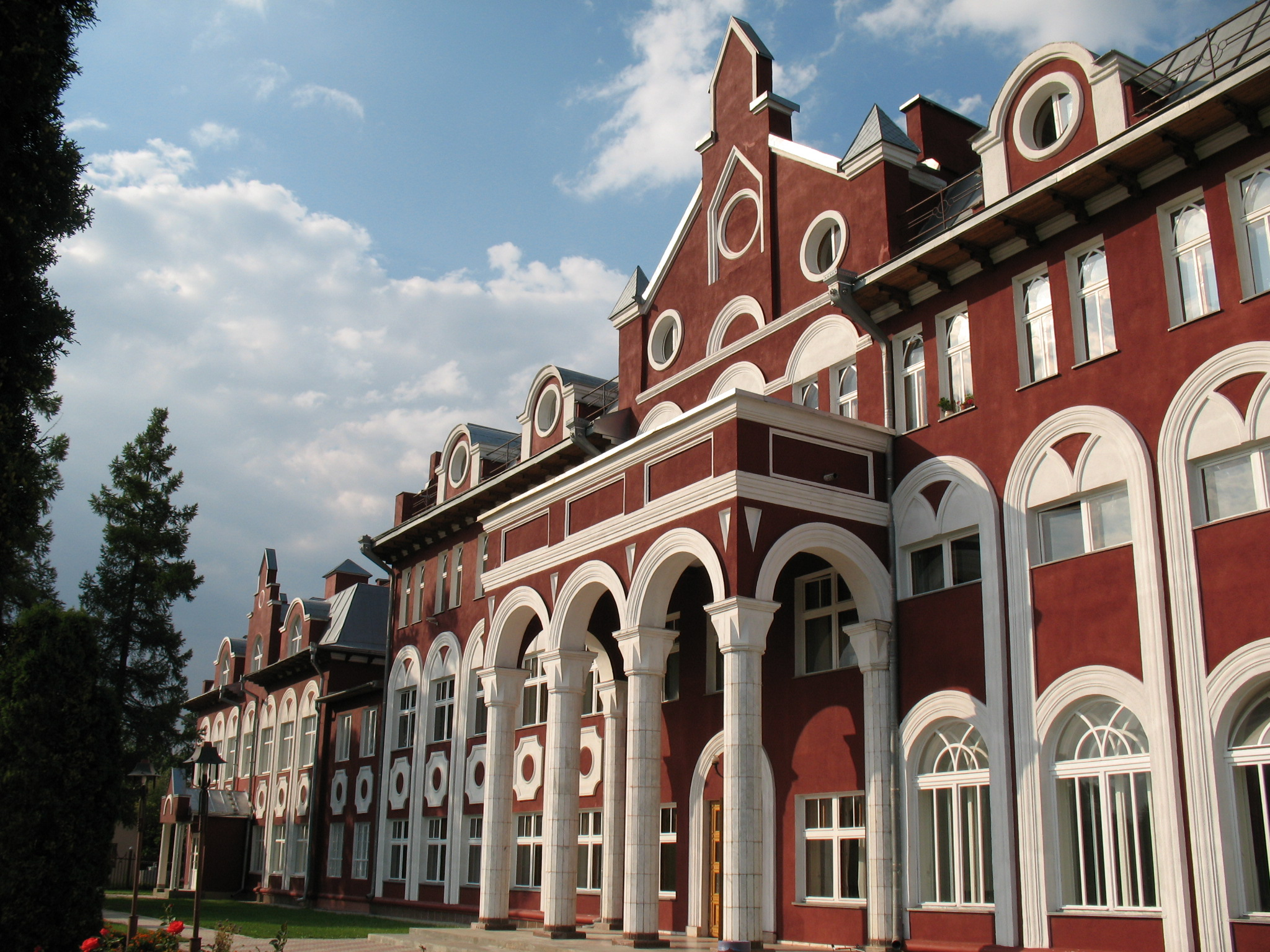
- Interactive map of Zaoksky
- Location of Zaoksky Zaoksky (Tula Oblast)
- Coordinates: 54.7330°N 37.3997°E
- Country: Russia
- Federal subject: Tula Oblast
- Administrative district: Zaoksky District
- Founded: 1935

Population (2010 Census)
  - Total: 7,117
  - Estimate (2021): 6,464 (−9.2%)
- Time zone: UTC+3 (MSK)
- Postal code: 301000
- OKTMO ID: 70622151051

Zaoksky (Russian: Зао́кский) is an urban locality (an urban-type settlement) in Zaoksky District of Tula Oblast, Russia. Population: 7,117 (2010 census); 6,668 (2002 census); 6,516 (1989 Soviet census).

Zaoksky Adventist University is located here.

Polenovo, the Museum Estate of famous painter Vasily Polenov, is located near Zaoksky.
