= Askan, Russia =

Rural locality in Zaoksky District, Tula Oblast, Russia

Coordinates: 54°47′34″N 37°17′36″E

Iskan (Russian: Искань) is a village in Zaoksky District of Tula Oblast, Russia.

- Latitude: 54 ° 47'60″ North Latitude
- Longitude: 37 ° 17'60″ East Longitude
- Height above sea level: 180 m
