= Sonino, Tula Oblast =

Village in Zaoksky District, Tula Oblast

Coordinates: 54°37′24″N 37°23′17″E

Sonino (Russian: Сонино) is a village in Zaoksky District of Tula Oblast, Russia.
