= Kobylinka, Tula Oblast =

Rural locality in Bogoroditsky District, Tula Oblast, Russia

Coordinates: 53°47′29″N 38°01′09″E

Kobylinka (Russian: Кобылинка) is a rural locality (a village) in Bogoroditsky District of Tula Oblast, Russia.
