= Olen, Russia =

Rural locality in Kiryevsky District, Russia

Coordinates: 53°53′N 38°01′E

Olen (Russian: Оле́нь) is a rural locality (a village) in Kireyevsky District of Tula Oblast, Russia, located 219 meters (719 ft) above sea level.
