= Zaoksky Adventist University =

Private Christian university in Tula Oblast, Russia

- Zaokskaya Dukhovnaya Akademiya
- Type: Private
- Established: 2003
- Affiliations: Andrews University, Loma Linda University
- President: Yury N. Drumi
- Location: Zaoksky, Russia; 54.7286911°N 37.4191689°E
- Website: zau.ru or zau.ru/en (English)
- Location within Tula Oblast Location within Russia

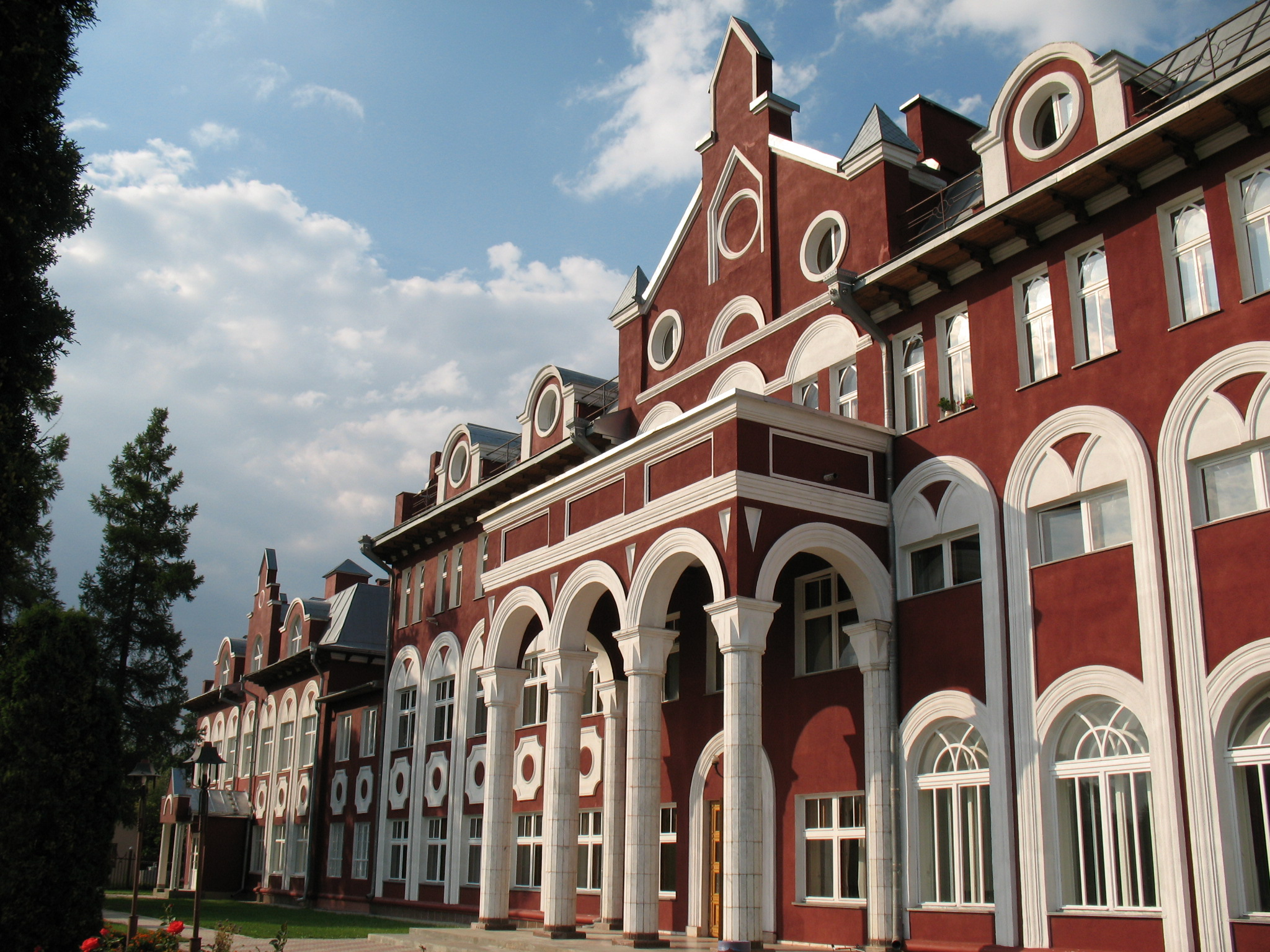

Zaoksky Adventist University is a private coeducational Christian university located in Tula Oblast of Russia, and is operated by the Seventh-day Adventist Church. It is a part of the Seventh-day Adventist education system, the world's second largest Christian school system.

Zaoksky Adventist University houses five educational institutions: Zaoksky Theological Seminary, Zaoksky Christian Institute of Arts and Sciences, Zaoksky Christian Professional College, Zaoksky Seventh-day Adventist School (K-11) and The Mittlaider-Agro Study Center.

== History ==
In January 1987, after numerous petitions and letters of request to Soviet authorities, the Seventh-day Adventist Church was given permission to open a three-year correspondence course for the training of ministers. The first class of 16 students began study in September of that year in the church building in the city of Tula. In January 1987, the church also received a plot of land of approximately two acres in the urban-type settlement of Zaoksky. The land housed an old school building which had been partly destroyed by fire. The local villagers used the gutted building which had three remaining walls as a garbage dump. In December 1988 when Zaoksky opened as the first Protestant seminary in Russian history.

A Bachelor of Arts degree in Religion was the first course of study offered which prepared young men for ministry in the vast territory of the Euro-Asia Division. A School of Agriculture directed by Jacob Mittleider was also established which offered a certificate program. In 1990 the Committee of Religious Affairs of the Soviet Union gave Zaoksky official registration as a full-time institution of higher education.

In subsequent years, the seminary added additional courses. In the last quinquennium the following degree programs have been added: M.A. in Music, 2000; B.A. in Economics, 2003; B.A. Degrees in Social Work, in Secondary English Education, and in Accounting, 2004; A.S. Degrees in Office Management and in Jurisprudence, 2004; M.A. in Public Health through Loma Linda University, 2005.

Among the most significant changes for Zaoksky is recognition from the Ministry of Education of the Russian Federation. In 2003 the Ministry granted the License of the Right of Educational Activities which is the first of a two part accreditation process. To satisfy the federal government, three separate educational institutions were created: Zaoksky Theological Seminary, Zaoksky Christian Institute of Arts and Sciences, and Zaoksky Christian Professional College. Graduates of government accredited degree programs receive government diplomas in addition to their denominational diplomas which will enable them to find jobs in a wider market place.

In 2003 the Board of Trustees organized Zaoksky Adventist University as a unified church institution. Today Zaoksky Adventist University houses five educational institutions: Zaoksky Theological Seminary, Zaoksky Christian Institute of Arts and Sciences, Zaoksky Christian Professional College, Zaoksky Seventh-day Adventist School (K-11) and The Mittlaider-Agro Study Center. The university also provides pastoral education in extension schools in seven locations throughout the Euro-Asia Division offering a degree to pastors in the field.

== Academic divisions ==
The university is composed of the following divisions:

- Music Department
- School of Economics
- Theological Department

== Accreditation ==
Zaoksky Adventist University is accredited by the Adventist Accrediting Association, is licensed by the Ministry of Education and Science of the Russian Federation and the Department of Education of the Tula Region, and is affiliated with Andrews University and Loma Linda University.

== See also ==
- List of Seventh-day Adventist colleges and universities
- Seventh-day Adventist education
