= Polenovo =

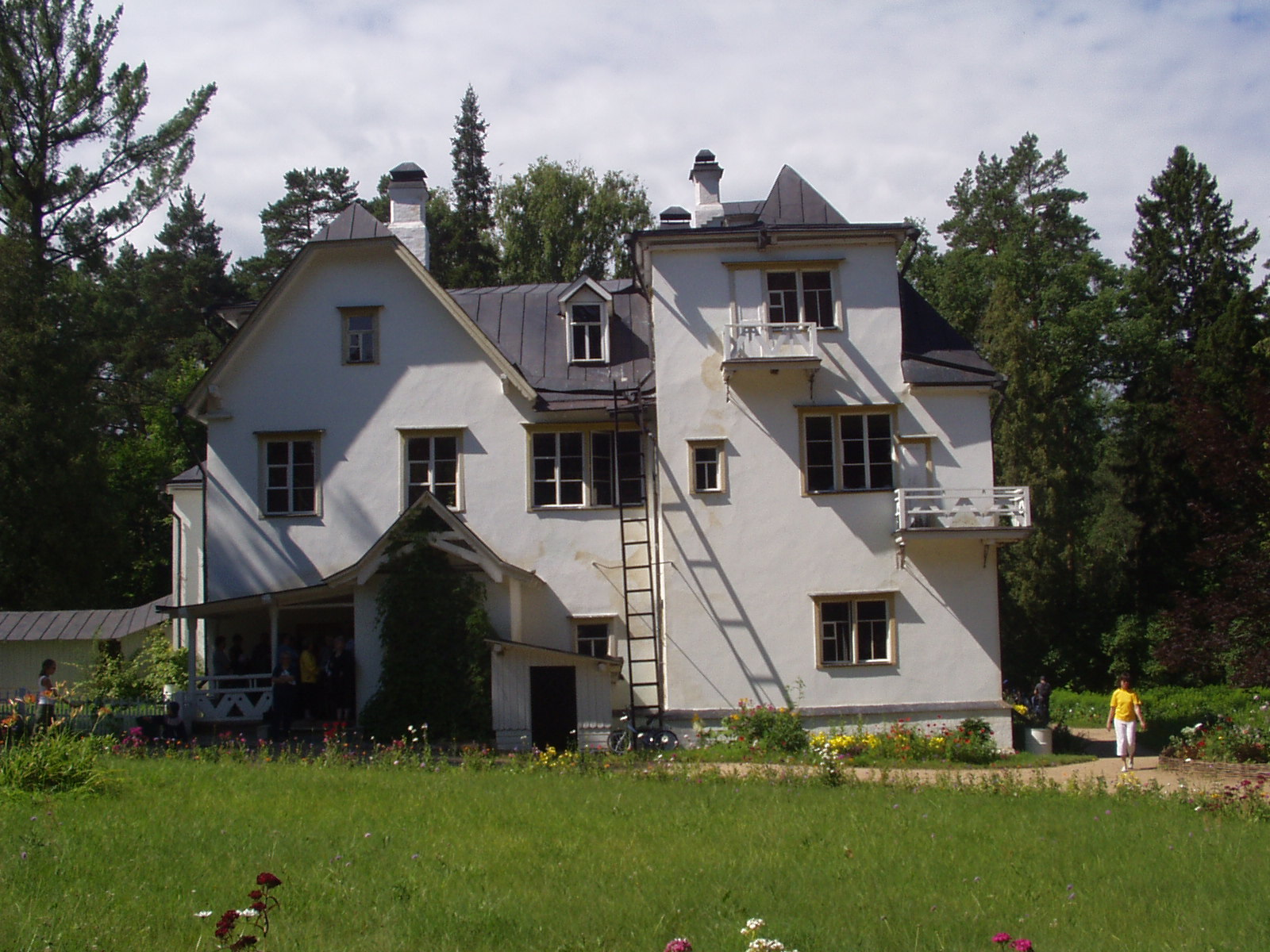
The white three storied house

Polenovo is the Museum Estate of Vasily Polenov. It is situated at the high right bank of the Oka river in Zaoksky District of the Tula Region, Russia. The estate (called Borok at that time) was acquired by Polenov in 1891. The white three-storied house was designed by Polenov himself. It was built in 1892.

After the death of Polenov in 1927 his relatives transferred all his collections and property to the state. The House Museum was established in 1939. It was renamed into Museum Estate of V.D. Polenov in 1950s. In 1983 the Estate was turned into State Memorial History, Art and Natural Museum Reserve.

Vasily Polenov's great-granddaughter Natalia Polenova has been director of the museum since 2011.

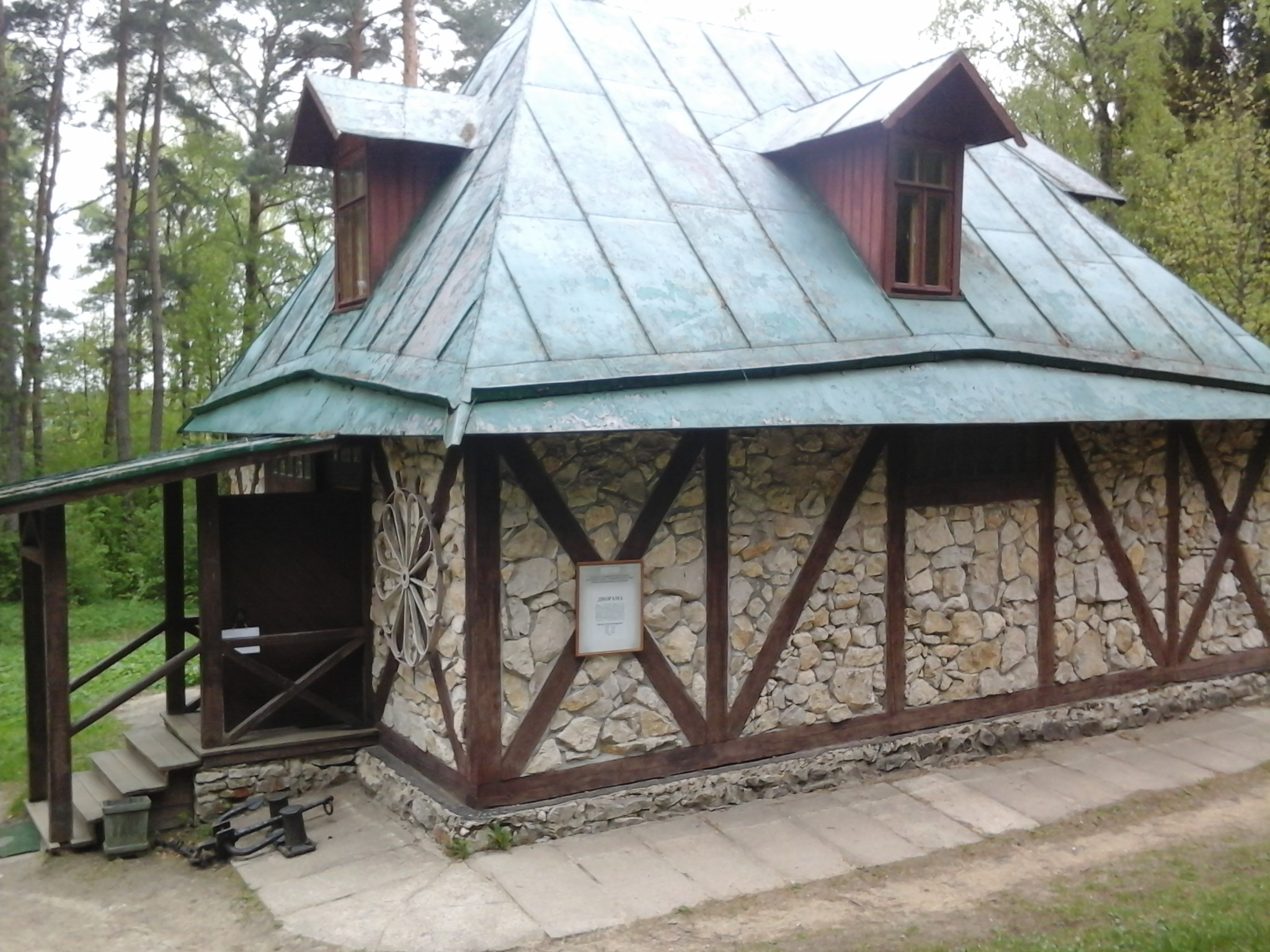
Diorama
