= Temyan =

Village in Tula Oblast, Russia

Coordinates: 54°44′N 37°21′E

Temyan Темьянь
- Village
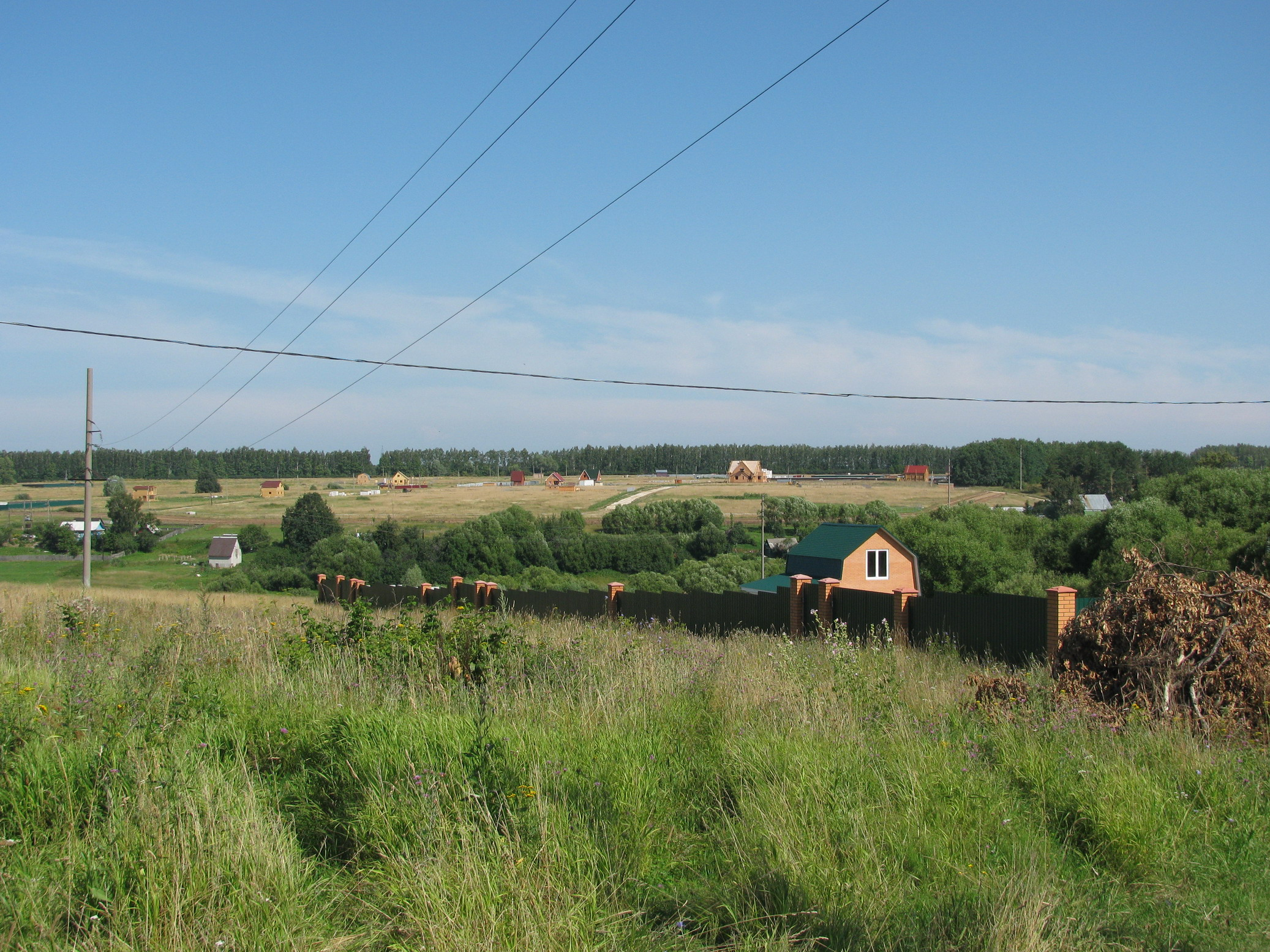
- Time zone: UTC+3

Temyan (Russian: Темьянь) is a rural locality (a village) in Zaoksky District of Tula Oblast, Russia.

== Geography ==
Temyan is located 2 km (1.24 mi) away from the administrative center of the Zaoksky District, Zaoksky. The other closest settlements are: Tem'yanskii, Skripovo, and Vydumki. The closest railway station is Tarusskaya.

== Infrastructure ==
The village is supplied with gas.

=== Street network ===
- Alexandrovskaya st.
- Klenovaya st.
- Krymskaya st.
- Lugovaya st.
- Maryinka st.
- Novaya st.
- Pavlovskaya st.
- Stroiteley st.
- Tsentralnaya st.
- Tsvetochnaya st.
- Yaroslavskaya st.
- Zapovednaya st.
