= Telezhyonka =

Rural locality in Yasnogorsky District, Tula Oblast, Russia

Coordinates: 54°30′39″N 37°36′58″E

Telezhyonka (Russian: Тележёнка) is a village in Yasnogorsky District of Tula Oblast, Russia.

- Latitude: 54 ° 31'00″ North Latitude
- Longitude: 37 ° 37'00″ East Longitude
- Height above sea level: 251 m
