= Lukovitsy =

Rural locality in Leninsky District, Tula Oblast, Russia

Coordinates: 54°21′N 37°18′E

Lukovitsy (Russian: Луковицы) is a village in Leninsky District of Tula Oblast, Russia. In the 18th century it was part of the Alexinsky district. The village church of the Nativity of the Blessed Virgin Mary was built.
