= Lukino, Tula Oblast =

Village in Tula Oblast, Russia

Lukino, Tula, Oblast
- Village
- Interactive map of Lukino, Tula, Oblast
- Coordinates: 53°48′41″N 37°23′34″E

Lukino (Russian: Лукино) is a village in Shchyokinsky District of Tula Oblast, Russia.
