= Chermoshnya, Tula Oblast =

Village in Tula Oblast, Russia

Coordinates: 53°45′32″N 37°31′20″E

Chermoshnya (Russian: Чермошня) is a village in Shchyokinsky District of Tula Oblast, Russia.

- Latitude: 53° 46' 00" North Latitude
- Longitude: 37° 31' 00" East Longitude
- Height above sea level: 246 m

== History ==
Since 1832, it belonged to the parents of Fyodor Dostoevsky, where the writer spent his childhood. The village is also mentioned a few times in his novel The Brothers Karamazov.
