= Toropovo, Tula Oblast =

Rural locality in Yasnogorsky District, Tula Oblast, Russia

Coordinates: 54°30′27″N 37°52′29″E

Toropovo (Russian: Торопово) is a village in Yasnogorsky District of Tula Oblast, Russia.

- Latitude: 54 ° 31'00″ North Latitude
- Longitude: 37 ° 52'60″ East Longitude
- Height above sea level: 252 m
