= Kazakovka, Tula Oblast =

Village in Moscow Oblast, Russia

Coordinates: 53°34′49″N 38°22′40″E

Kazakovka (Russian: Казаковка) is a village in Kurkinsky District of Tula Oblast, Russia.

- Latitude: 53 ° 34'60" North Latitude
- Longitude: 38 ° 22'60" East Longitude
- Height above sea level: 198 m
