= Taydakovo, Tula Oblast =

Rural locality in Yasnogorsky District, Tula Oblast, Russia

Coordinates: 54.682°N 37.404°E

Taydakovo (Russian: Тайдаково) is a village in Yasnogorsky District of Tula Oblast, Russia.

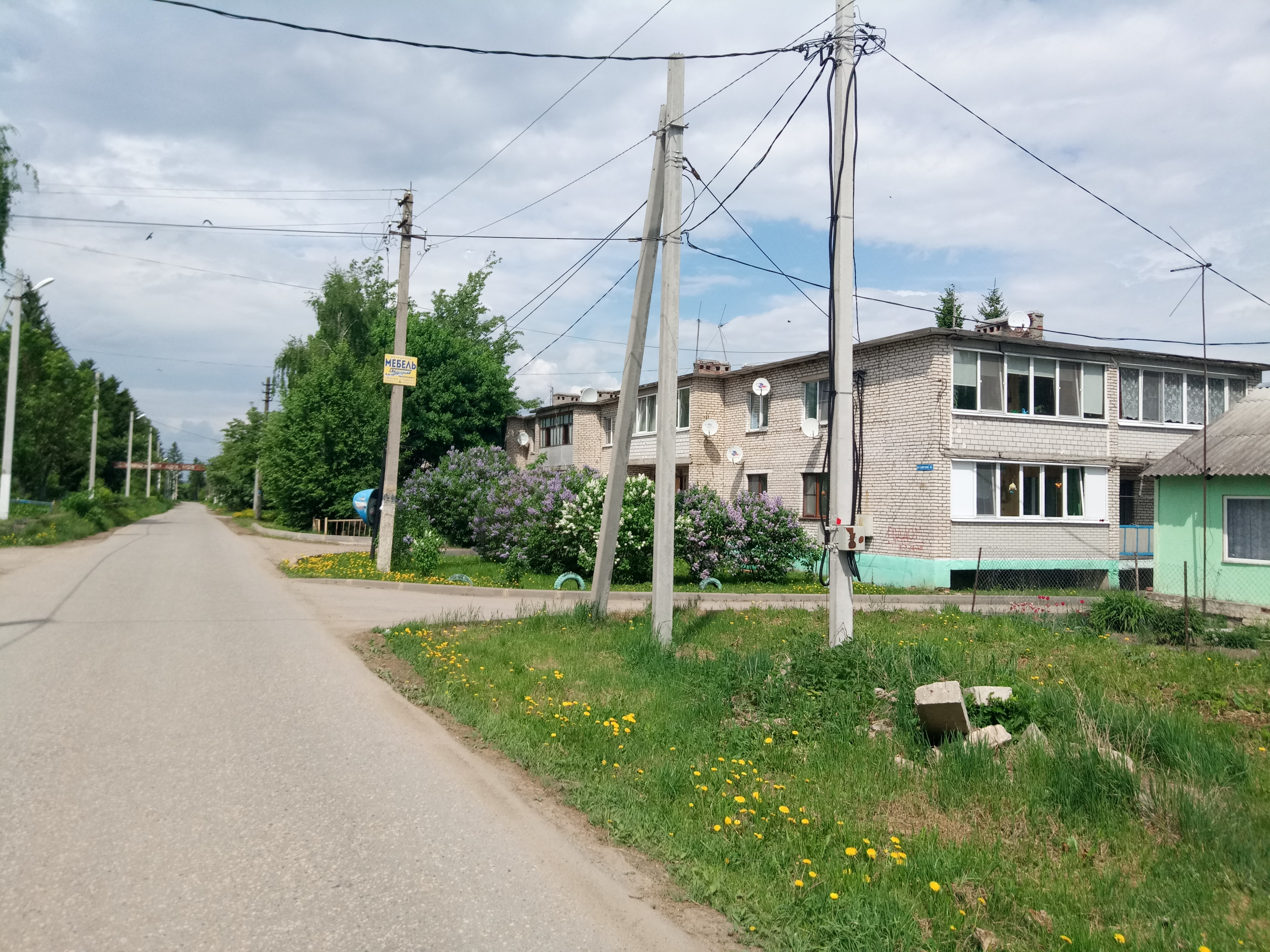
Taydakovo

== Gallery ==
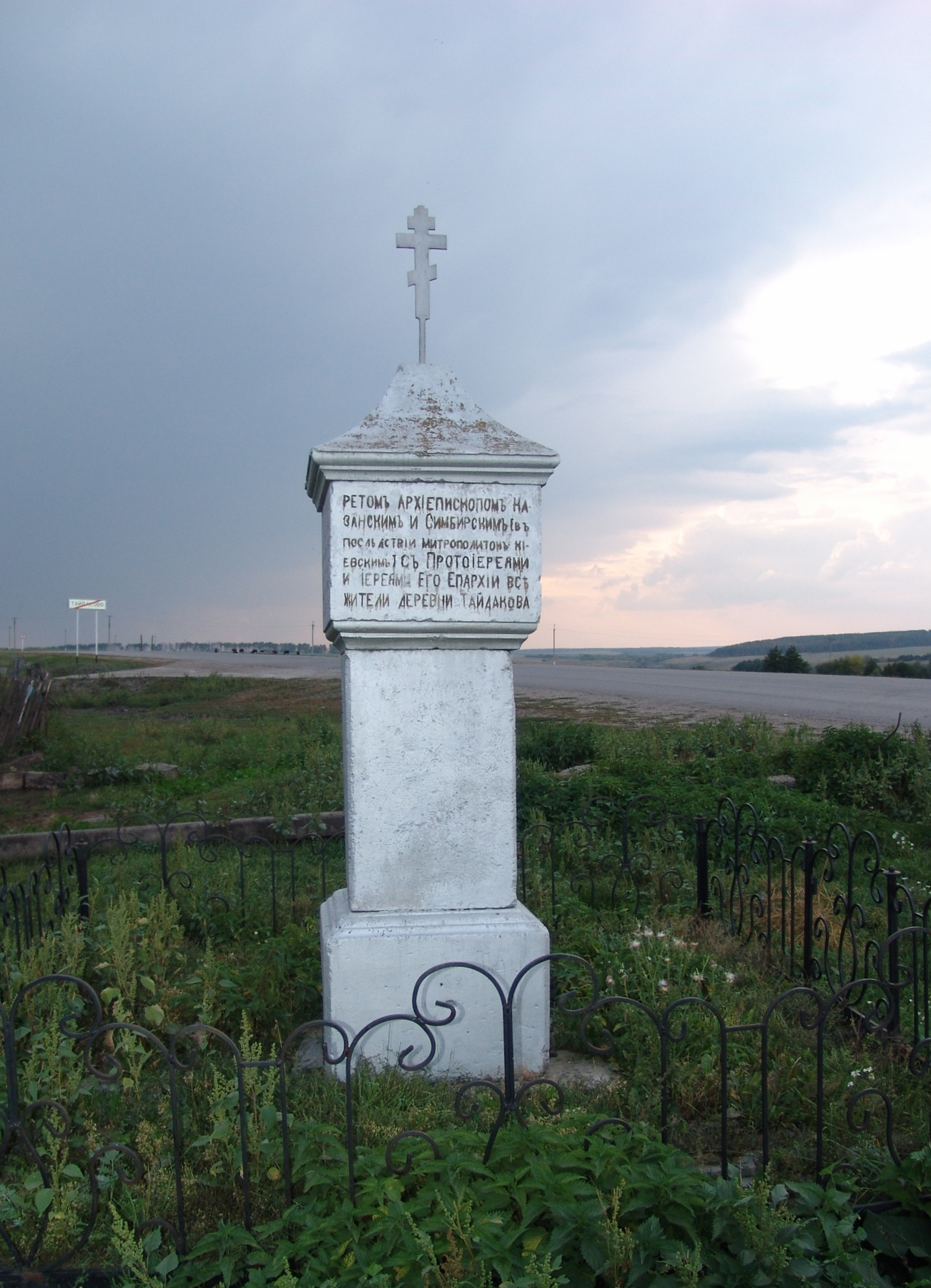
Baptism Monument of the inhabitants of Taydakovo on August 30, 1829

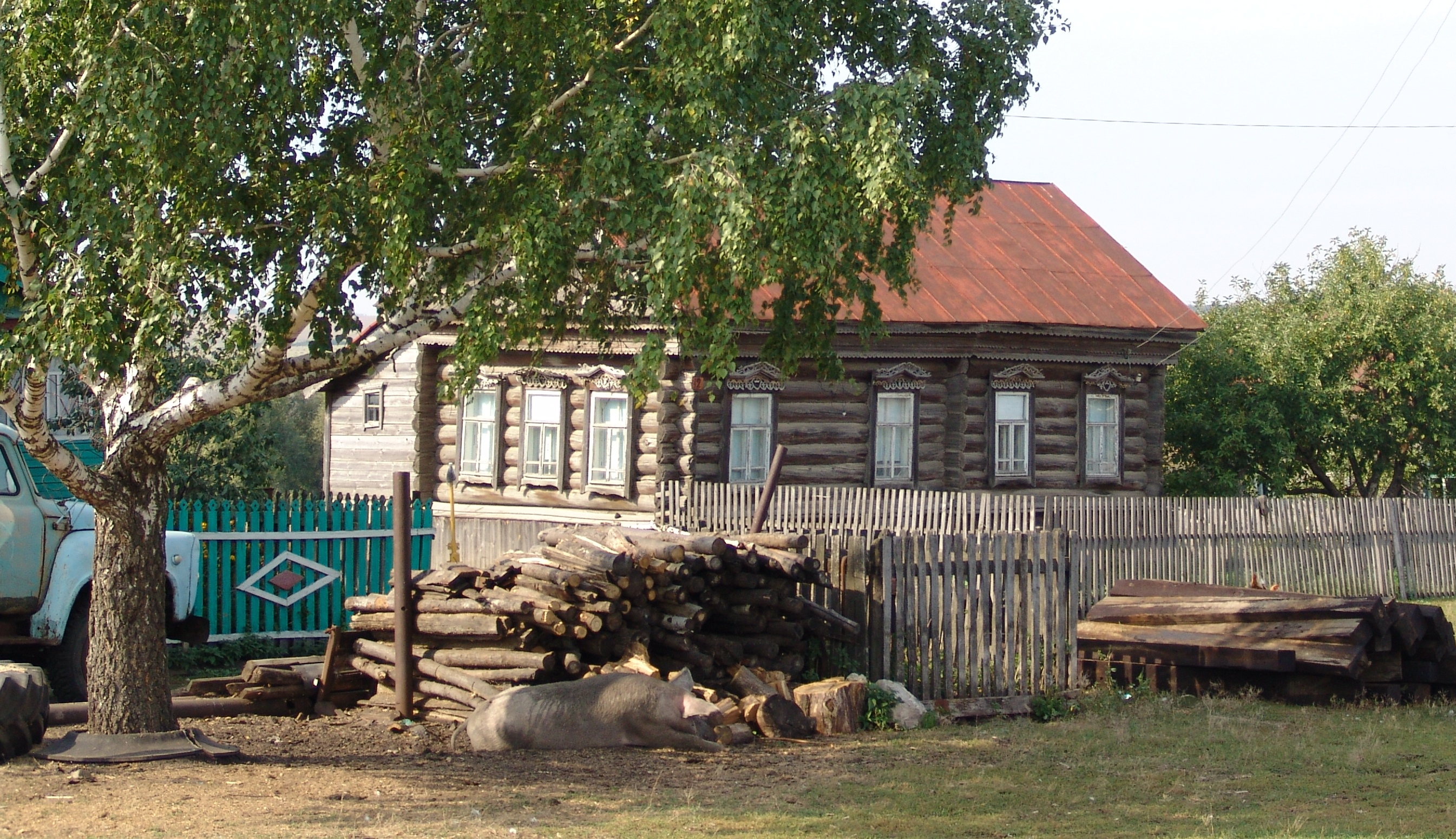
The rural landscape of Taydakovo

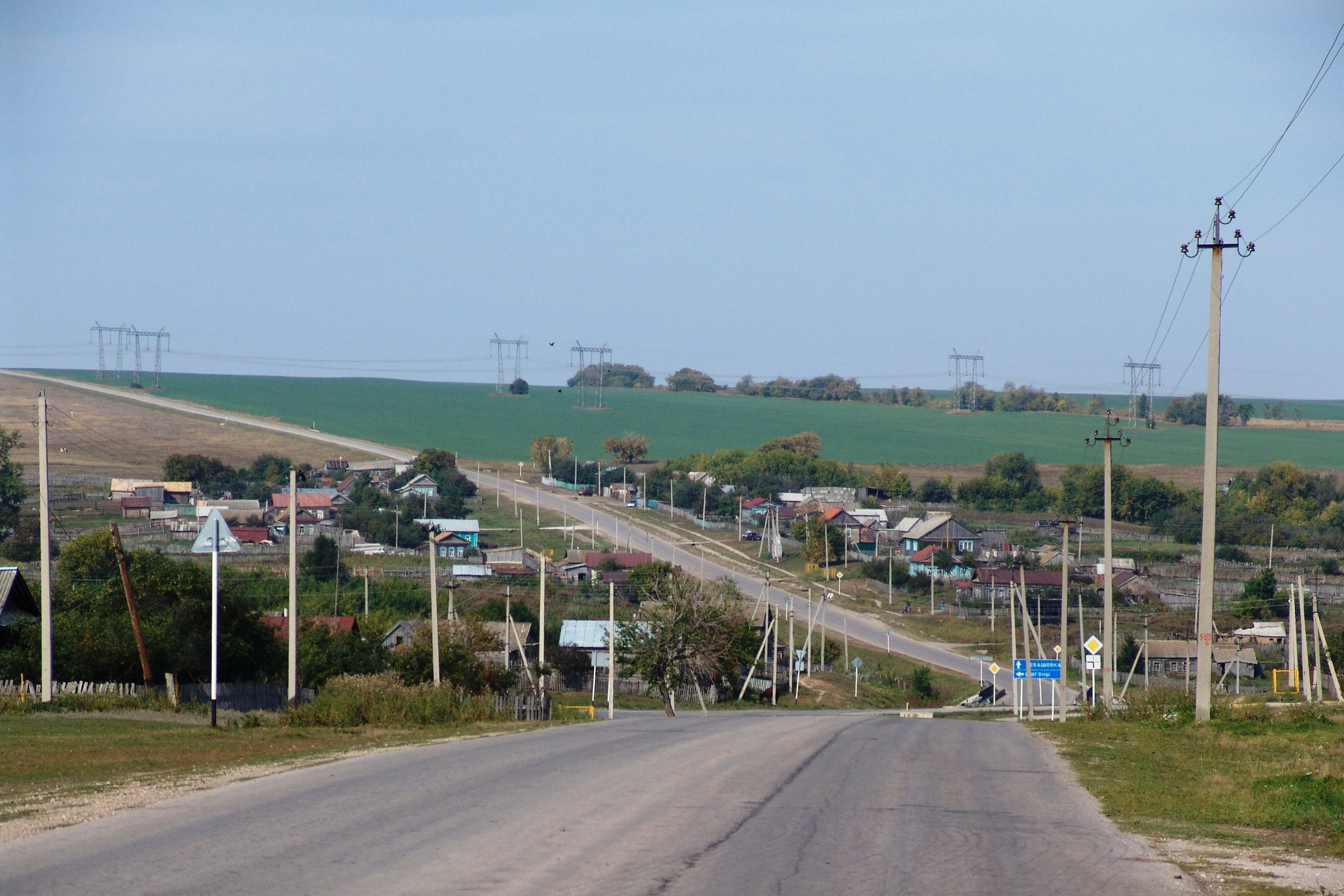
The Road to Taydakovo
