= Zaoksky District =

Zaoksky District Заокский район (Russian)
- District
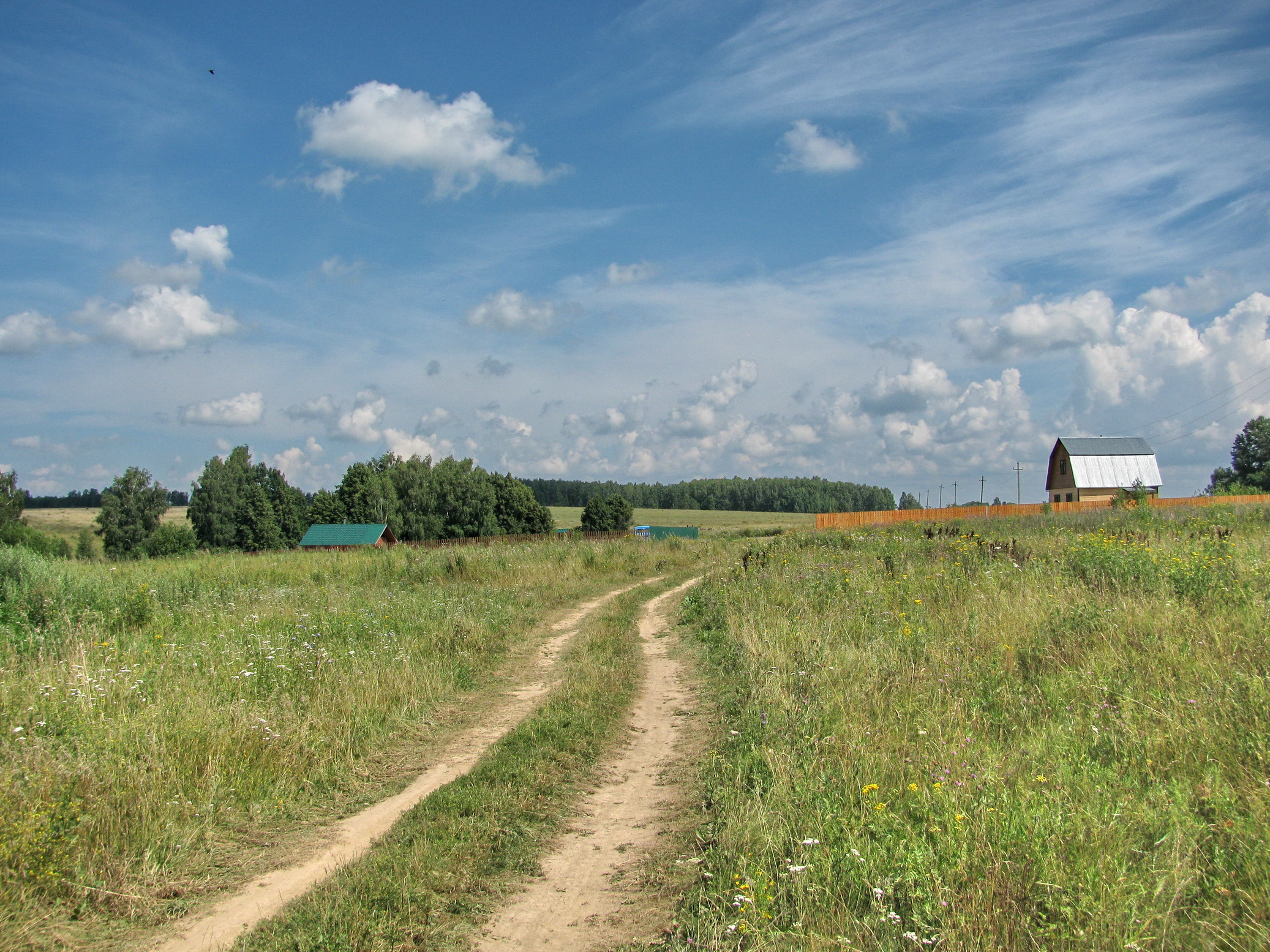
- Naspischi Road, Zaoksky District

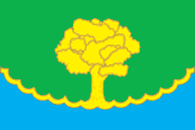
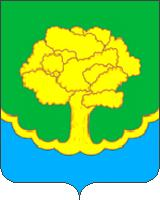
- Flag Coat of arms
- Location of Zaoksky District in Tula Oblast
- Coordinates: 54°44′06″N 37°24′02″E
- Country: Russia
- Federal subject: Tula Oblast
- Established: 1924
- Administrative center: Zaoksky

Area
  - Total: 918.4 km^{2} (354.6 sq mi)

Population (2010 Census)
  - Total: 22,368
  - Density: 24.36/km^{2} (63.08/sq mi)
  - Urban: 31.8%
  - Rural: 68.2%

Administrative structure
  - Administrative divisions: 1 Urban-type settlements, 12 Rural okrugs
  - Inhabited localities: 1 urban-type settlements, 152 rural localities

Municipal structure
  - Municipally incorporated as: Zaoksky Municipal District
  - Municipal divisions: 1 urban settlements, 4 rural settlements
- Time zone: UTC+3 (MSK)
- OKTMO ID: 70622000

Zaoksky District (Russian: Зао́кский райо́н) is an administrative district (raion), one of the twenty-three in Tula Oblast, Russia. As a municipal division, it is incorporated as Zaoksky Municipal District. It is located in the north of the oblast. The area of the district is 918.4 square kilometers (354.6 sq mi). Its administrative center is the urban locality (a work settlement) of Zaoksky. Population: 22,368 (2010 Census); 19,406 (2002 census); 20,429 (1989 Soviet census). The population of the administrative center accounts for 31.8% of the district's total population.

== See also ==
- Temyan
