= 1806 in Russia =

Events from the year 1806 in Russia

== Incumbents ==
- Monarch – Alexander I

== Events ==
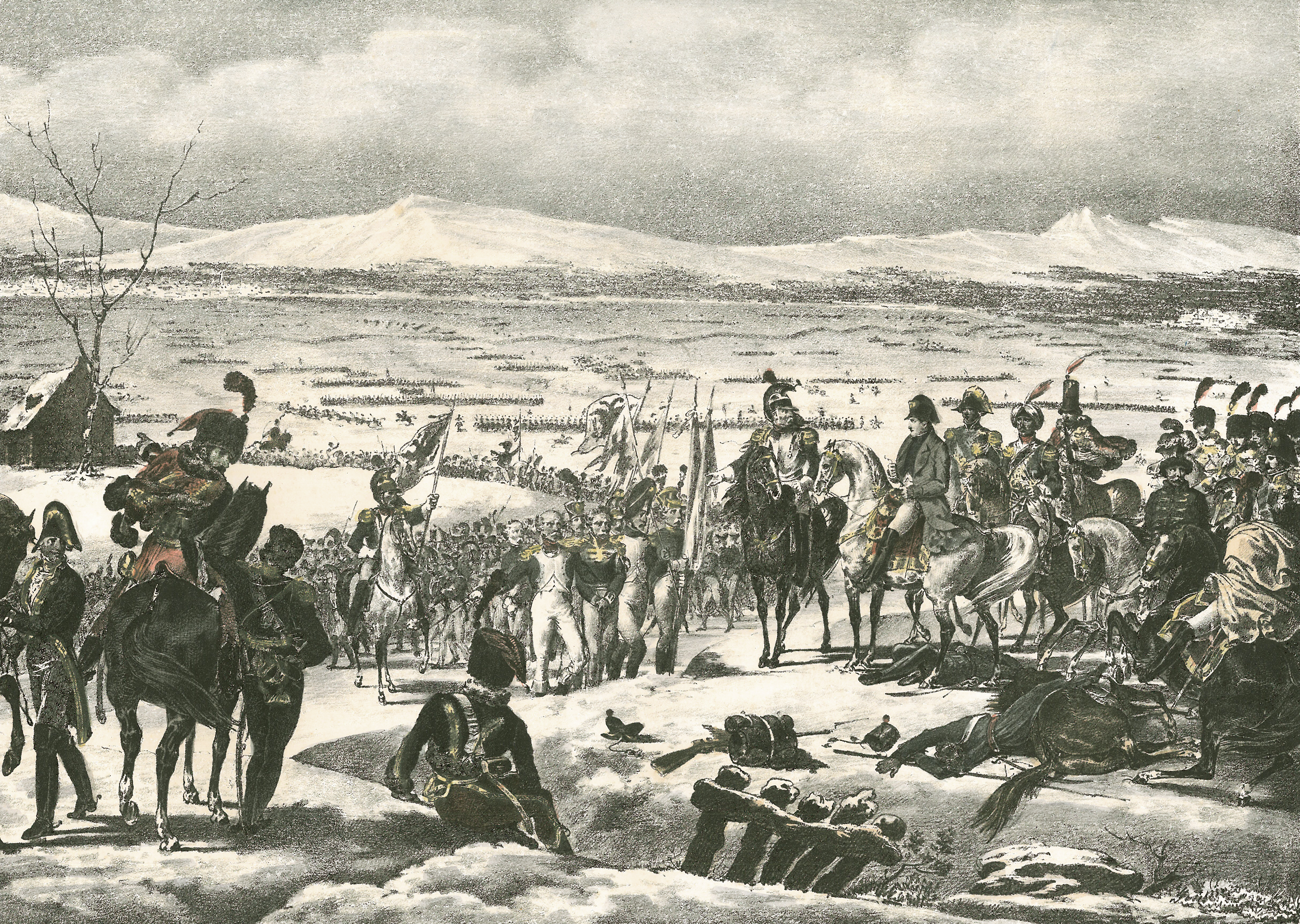
Battle of Pułtusk, 1806

- War of the Third Coalition ends
- Russo-Persian War (1804–1813)
  - February 20: Death of Russian commander Pavel Tsitsianov
  - October 6: Capture of Baku
- War of the Fourth Coalition begins
  - December 23: Battle of Czarnowo
  - December 26: Battle of Pułtusk
  - December 26: Battle of Golymin
- Russo-Turkish War (1806–1812) begins in December
- August 1806: First Russian circumnavigation of the earth completed
- Alexander I Palace (Taganrog) built
- St Petersburg College for the Deaf founded
- Saint-Petersburg Elizabethan Institute founded.

== Births ==
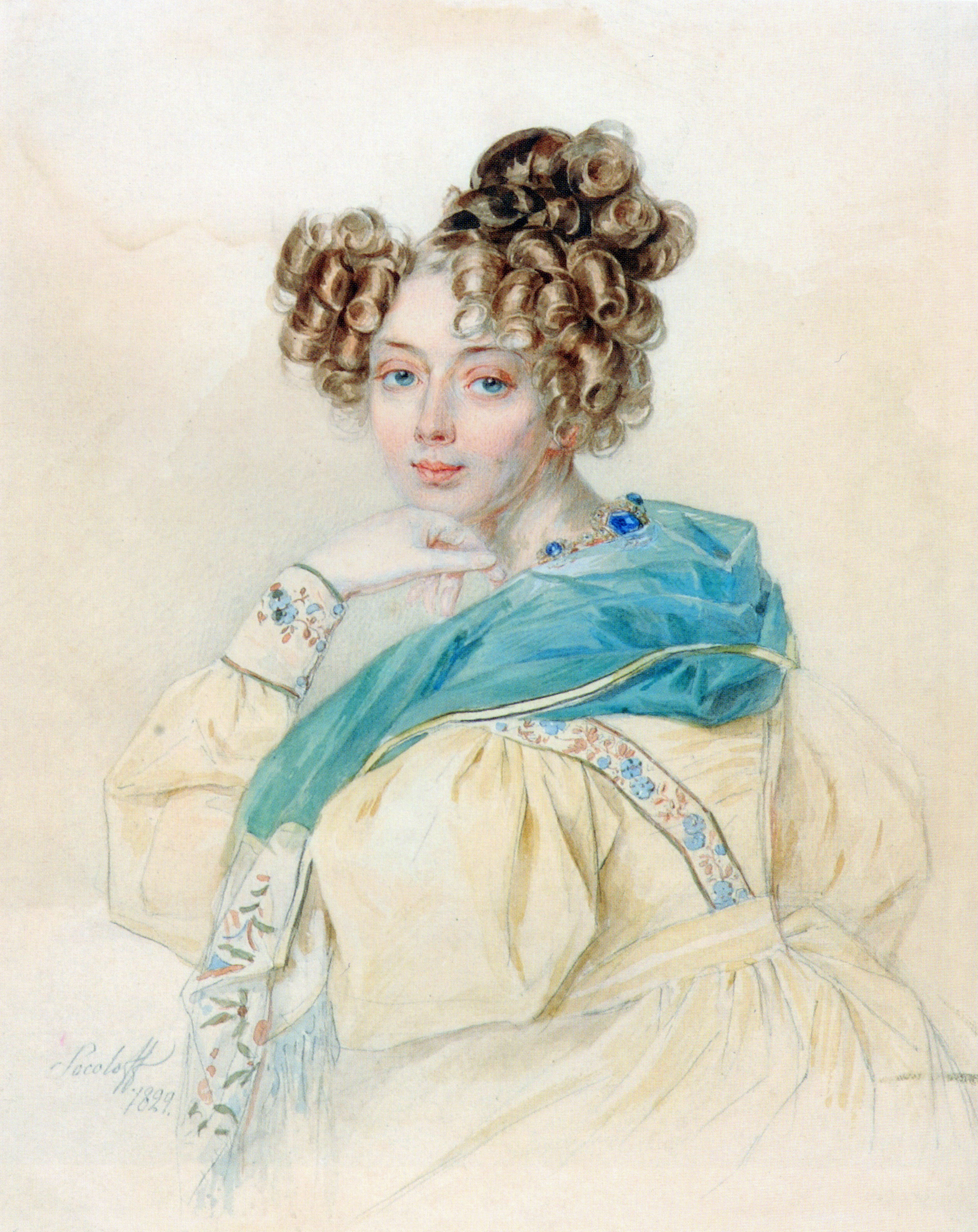
Olga Alexandrovna Orlova (1829)

- Levko Borovykovsky, Ukrainian poet, translator, and folklorist (d. 1889)
- Alecu Donici, Moldavian poet and translator (b. 1865)
- Grand Duchess Elizabeth Alexandrovna of Russia, child of Alexander I (d. 1808)
- Georg Albert Fuss, astronomer (d. 1854)
- Josef Gusikov, Belarusian-Jewish klezmer musician (d. 1837)
- Lionel Kieseritzky, Baltic German chess master and theoretician (d. 1853)
- Ivan Kireyevsky, literary critic and philosopher (d. 1856)
- Vladimir Alexeyevich Kornilov, vice admiral (d. 1854)
- Alexander Koshelev, writer, journalist, and public official (d. 1883)
- Ismayil bek Kutkashensky, Armenian major general in the Russian army and writer (d. 1861)
- Alexander Andreyevich Ivanov, painter (d. 1858)
- Ferdinand Minding, German-born mathematician (d. 1885)
- Pylyp Morachevskyi, Ukrainian poet and bible translator (d. 1879)
- Olga Alexandrovna Orlova, state lady of the court and numismatist (d. 1880)
- Osip Petrov, operatic bass-baritone (d. 1878)
- Dmitriy Vasilevich Polenov, archaeologist (d. 1878)
- Isaac Judah Loeb Rabinowitz, Lithuanian Jewish rabbi and scholar (d. 1851)
- Prince Alexey Saltykov, diplomat, artist, traveller (d. 1859)
- Stepan Shevyryov, literary historian and poet (d. 1864)
- Oleksa Storozhenko, writer, anthropologist, and playwright (d. 1874)
- Count Ivan Matveyevich Tolstoy, diplomat, senator, court official, minister of postal services (d. 1867)
- Alexander von Ungern-Sternberg, Baltic German novelist, poet, and painter (d. 1869)
- Yusuf bek Kurinski, last khan of Kura Khanate, major general (d. 1878)

== Deaths ==
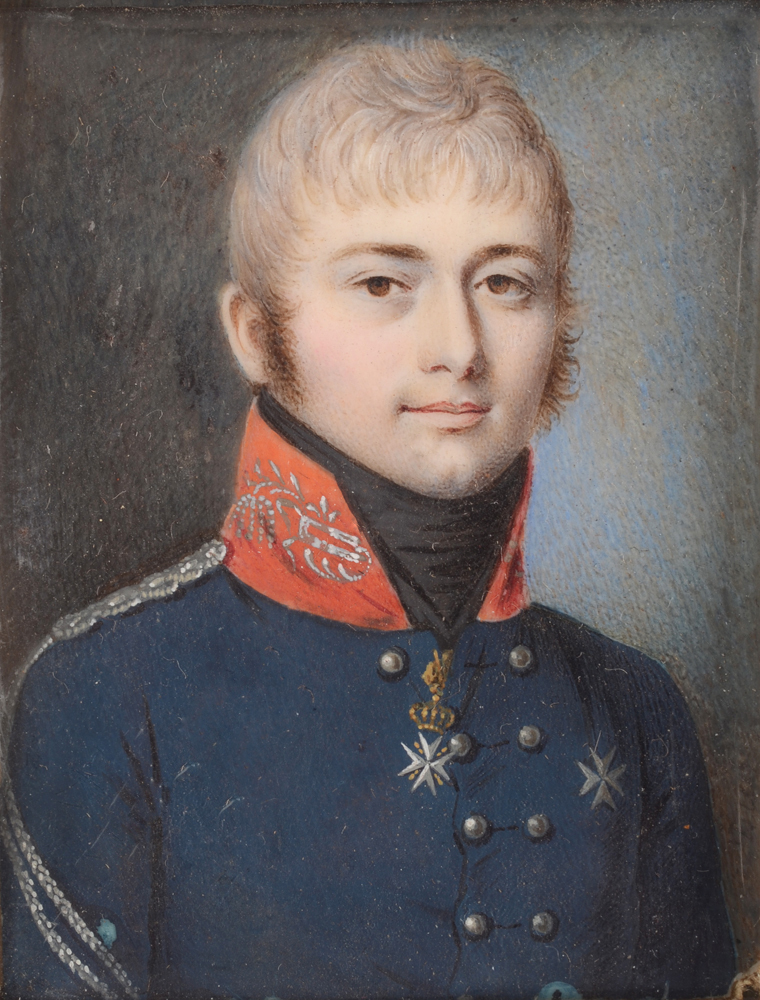
Peter Dolgorukov, circa 1800

- Peter Petrovich Dolgorukov, nobleman and general (b. 1777)
- Adam Laxman, military officer led 1791 expedition to Japan (b. 1766)
- Elena von Rehbinder, industrialist (b. 1744)
- Pavel Tsitsianov, Georgian noble, Russian army general (b. 1754)
- Count Sergey Yaguzhinsky, court official, officer, factory owner (b. 1731)
