= Elena von Rehbinder =

Helena "Elena" Wilhelmine von Rehbinder (née von Stackelberg; 1744–1806), was a Russian baroness and industrialist.

Elena von Rehbinder was born Helena Wilhelmine von Stackelberg, daughter of Fabian Adam von Stackelberg och Charlotte Helena von Liphart. She married in 1763 to baron General Reinhold Johan (Ivan Michailovich) von Rehbinder (1733–1792), governor of Nizhny Novgorod and Belorussia, with whom she had nine children.

She was the owner of 799 serfs and of the Voiskovitsa estate near Gatchina, on which she founded two distilleries operated by her serfs. In 1795, she produced 52.375 litres alcohol, of which 49.200 was sold to the state, making a good profit. In contemporary Russia, it became fashionable for noblewomen to manage distilleries on their estates by the help of serfs, manufacturing alcohol they sold to the Imperial state. In contrast to Western Europe, where married women where under the legal guardianship of their husbands, the Russian law of 1753 acknowledged married women the right to own and manage property in their own name independent from their husbands. In the late 18th-century, nobles founding factories was not unusual in Russia, where the merchant class was still small, and some noblewomen became successful industrialists: of fourteen women industrialists in 18th-century Russia, all but four (Marfa Kokina, Domna Yuferova, Barbara Cholle and Nadezha Shergina) were noblewomen.
