= Vasily Polenov =

Russian artist

- Василий Поленов
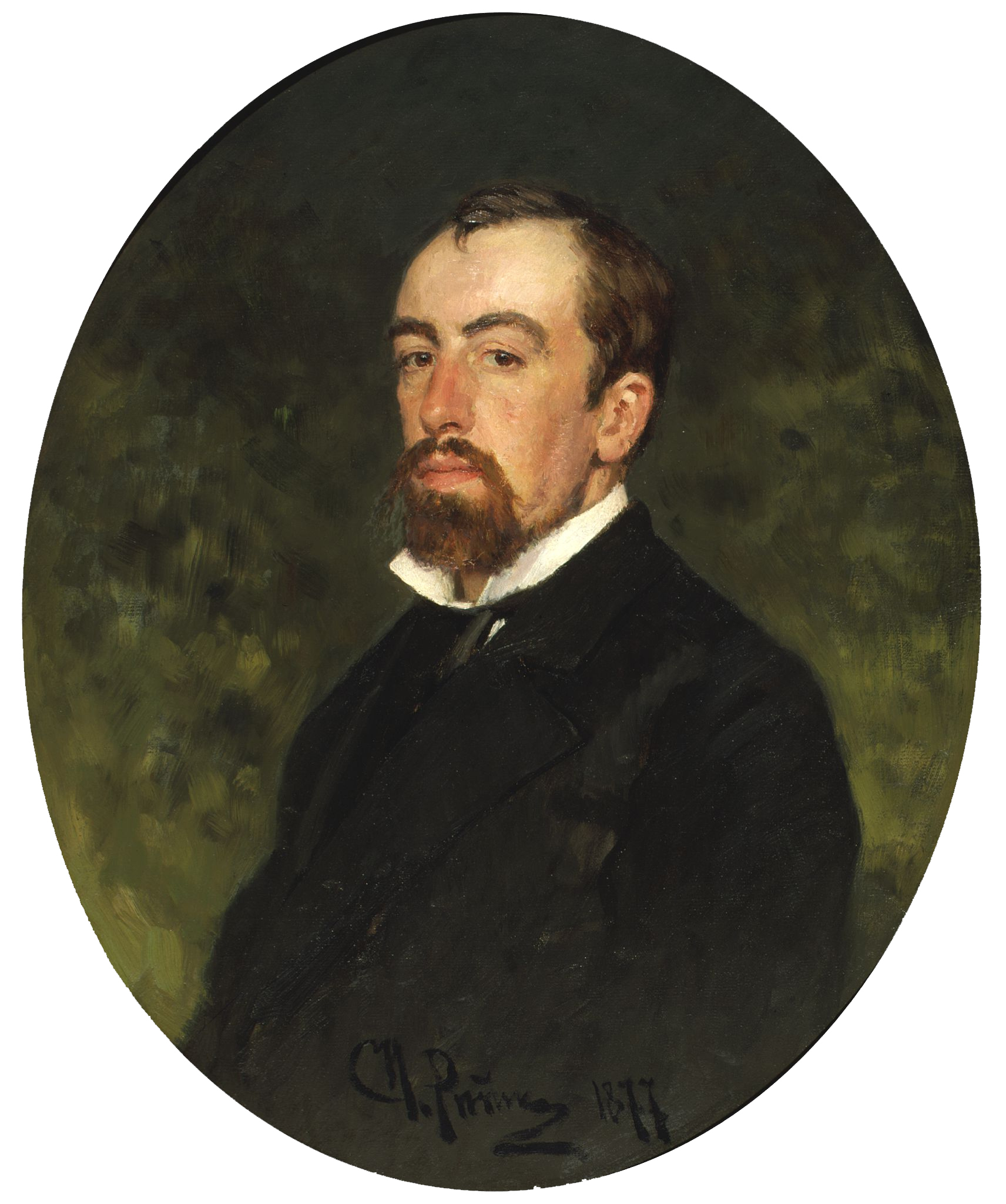
- Portrait by Ilya Repin, 1877
- Born: Vasily Dmitrievich Polenov; June 1, 1844; St. Petersburg, Russia
- Died: July 18, 1927 (aged 83); Polenovo, Russia
- Education: Member Academy of Arts (1876); Professor by rank (1892); Full Member Academy of Arts (1893)
- Alma mater: Imperial Academy of Arts (1870)
- Occupation: Artist
- Movement: Peredvizhniki
- Awards: Big Gold Medal of the Imperial Academy of Arts (1871)

Vasily Dmitrievich Polenov (Russian: Василий Дмитриевич Поленов; 1 June 1844 – 18 July 1927) was a Russian landscape painter associated with the Peredvizhniki movement of realist artists. His contemporaries would call him the "Knight of Beauty" as he embodied both European and Russian traditions of painting. His vision of life was summarized as following: "Art should promote happiness and joy".

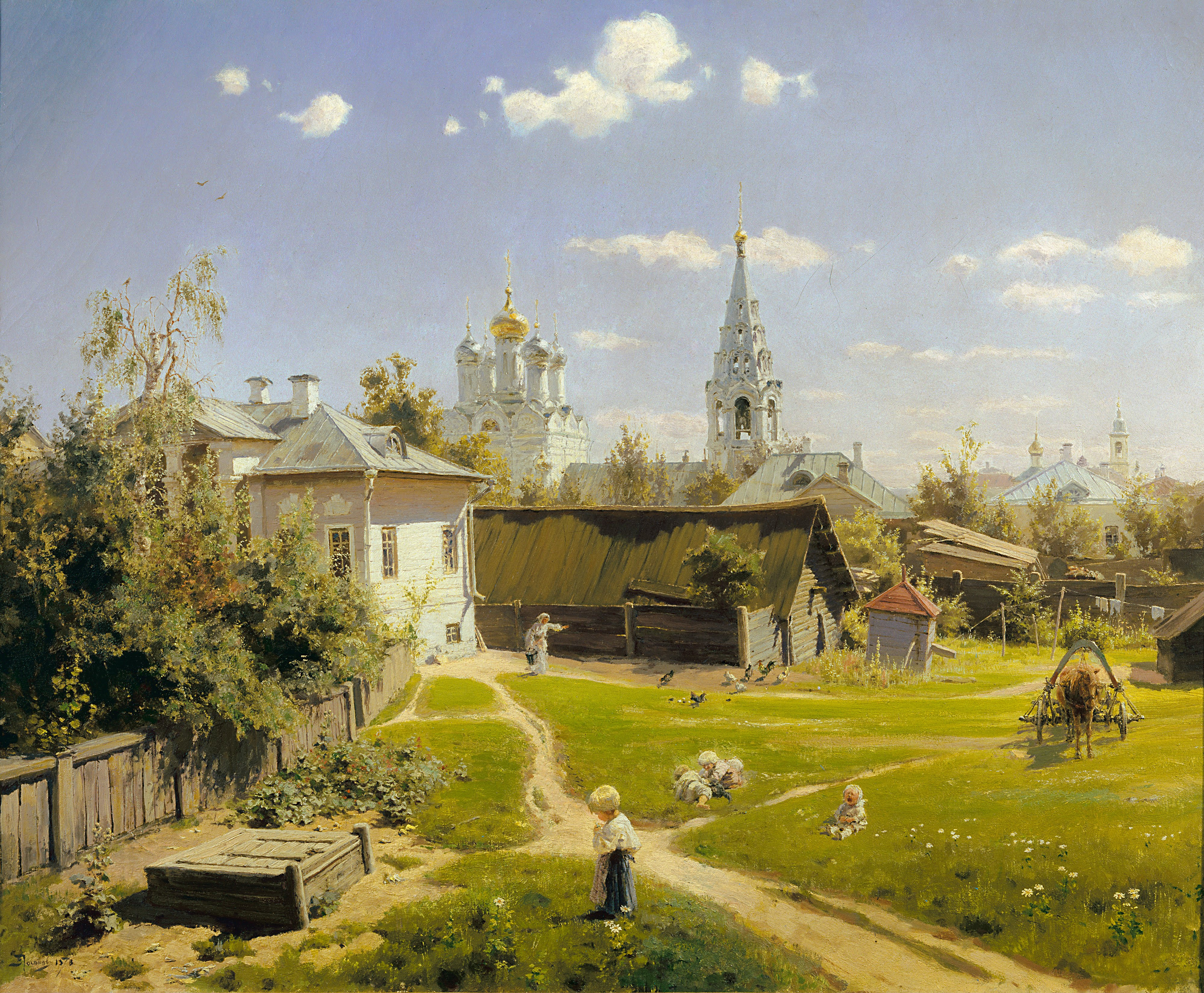
Polenov's celebrated painting of a traditional Russian courtyard (1878), Tretyakov Gallery

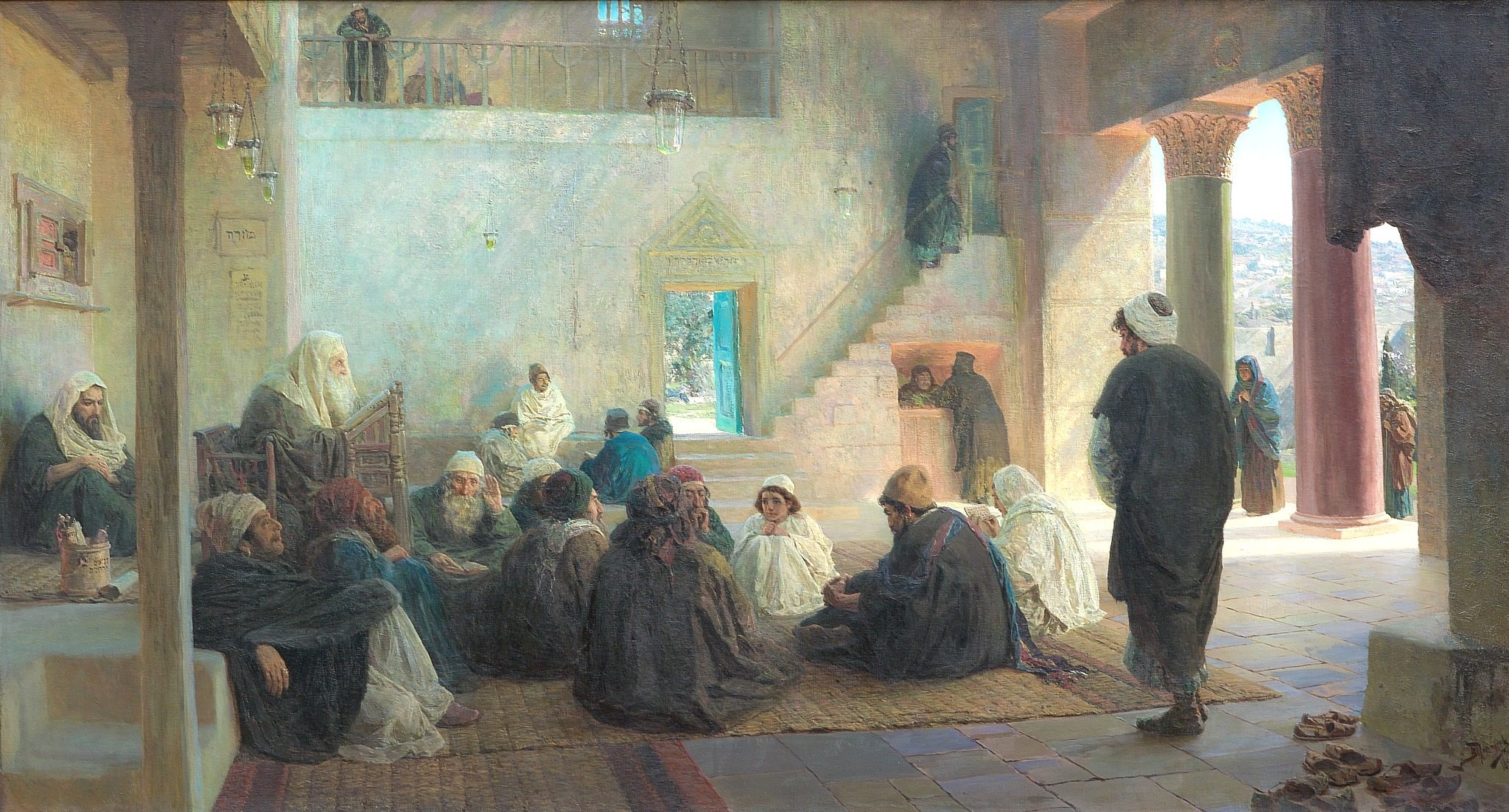
Christ among the Doctors (1896), Tretyakov Gallery

== Early life and family heritage ==
As a native of St. Petersburg, Polenov grew up in a wealthy, intellectual and artistic family. During his teenage years, in the 1860s, Russia was energized by great minds promoting the virtues of democracy, progress, education, and they would stand against oppression.

The painter's father, Dmitriy Vasilevich Polenov (1806–1872), was a well known archaeologist and bibliographer. As a representative of the Academy of Sciences and then as the secretary of the Russian embassy of Athens, he spent 3 years in Greece. There he would meet important personalities at the time linked to the world of Art and Science: the painter Karl Briullov, the architect Roman Kuzmin (some years after, he would help design and build the Polenov family house at Imotchensy). At his return to Russia, according to the advice he received during his life abroad, Dmitri Polenov started to do archaeological digs in ancient Russian sites. For many years he devoted his knowledge and work to the Secretary of the Russian Archeological Society. In 1860, he travelled with his sons. This long horseback journey led them to Novgorod, Rostov, Yaroslav, Suzdal, Vladimir, Tver. Vasily Polenov was encouraged by his father to draw sketches of any interesting ancient subject he would witness. His mother, Maria Alekseevna (1816–1895), was a painter and a portraitist; she received her lessons from the academician Moldavski, a partner of Karl Briullov. She also wrote a book in 1852 about the life of a family spending the summertime in a dacha. Summer in Tsarkoye Selo was then re-edited with illustrations made by Vassili Polenov and his younger sister, Elena, also an artist. From both parents and grandparents Vasily and his siblings would receive general knowledge about physics, history, geography and also the biographies of famous painters and musicians, and this tradition was stated in his mother's book in order to reach other children.

His maternal grandmother was also very important during the painter's childhood. Vera Voeikova (1792–1873) received an excellent education as a young girl thanks to a woman that raised her after her parents’ death. She knew French and Russian literature. As a "mamie", she managed to teach the importance of developing artistic abilities and she also told stories about the war of 1812. Her fiancé, the Colonel Alexeï Voeikov, had had important military missions. Today, at the Museum-House of Polenovo, one can see a glass cup with the Napoleonic coat of arms. Alexeï retrieved it from a chest containing French army official dinner service.

Another important ancestor of Vasily Polenov was his great grandfather, Alekseï Polenov (1738–1816). As a famous scholar, he was the first Russian jurist with a multidisciplinary education, including economics, history, and philosophy.. He participated in an essay competition organized by the Free Economic Society in 1766 on the following subject: "What is more useful to the State: that peasants should own land or own only property?". His text was then entitled "On the abolition of the serfdom of Russian peasants", which became effective 100 years after.

== Studies and European years ==
Vasily Polenov simultaneously enrolled to the Imperial Academy of Arts and to the Law University in Saint Petersbourg (1863–1871). Polenov studied under Pavel Chistyakov and was a classmate and close friend of Rafail Levitsky, a fellow Peredvizhniki artist and photographer. Their letters, which are now stored in the Polenov's House museum, are an interesting account of the many art exhibitions, movements and artists of their time.

As bachelors, Polenov and Levitsky lived and worked together in "Devich'e Pole" (the name of the street "Maiden's Field"), in an attic of the Olsufevsky House (the home of Rafail Levitsky's future wife Anna Vasilevna Olsufevskaya). This house is illustrated by Polenov in his painting Grandmother's Garden (1878).

As one of the best students of the Imperial Academy of Fine Arts, he received the Great Medal for his painting The Resurrection of the daughter of Jairus (1871, Museum of the Academy of Fine Arts, St. Petersburg). This work was his first approach to a biblical theme for which the young artist had a deep interest. The price he received for this painting allowed him, along with other laureates, to become a pensioner (scholarship's owner) abroad and live in Europe at the expenses of the Russian State. At the end of the summer of 1872, Vasily Polenov crossed Germany and Switzerland before settling in Venice and then Rome the following year. His Italian stay did not stimulate him much, he lacked from inspiration and worked very little. Nevertheless, there, two major encounters happened and shaped his lifetime work. In "the Eternal City", he felt in love with the young Maroussia Obolenskaya who died the same year of measles. However, Rome, has also been the scene of a fruitful and exciting meeting with Savva Mamontov (1841–1918), a rich entrepreneur, art lover and philanthrope. Together, in Italy, they were already planning to create a circle of multidisciplinary artists. The Mamontov's estate in Abramtsevo seemed to be the ideal place to set up some artists' studios and a theater.

It is also in Italy that his passion and admiration for the painter Paul Veronese (1528–1588), a great colourist of the Venetian golden age, was confirmed. Vasily Polenov wrote about him: "He has something attractive, which makes anyone fall in love with his art; we feel the taste of life in the people he paints". He also acquired one of his sketches, The Struggle of Jacob with the Angel, which he will keep later in the library of the house-museum.

The second major chapter of his stay in Europe is in France, in Paris and Normandy. It is in Montmartre at 72 rue Blanche and at 13 rue Véron that he established his studio in the autumn of 1973. In Paris, he attended Alexei Bogolyubov’s events (1824–1896), an official painter of the Russian Navy and also in charge of the orientation of the young residents of the Imperial Academy in France. He played a vital role in the careers of young artists because he would find them clients and present them to the restricted circles of the Parisian artistic world. Every Tuesday, the preceptor organized ceramics and etching workshops while bringing together painters, writers and singers. The creation of painted ceramics was also a good mean of acquiring additional incomes for the scholars, as these objects were highly prized in the French capital. These Russian meetings were mainly frequented by the painters Ilya Repine, Vasily Polenov, Konstantin Savitski, Alexander Beggrov, Nikolai Dmitriev-Orenburgsky, Pentaleon Schyndler, Alexei Harlamov and Mikhail Dolivo-Dobrovolski.

During these years, the painter tried all kinds of painting in order to find his true talent. He painted historical scenes (The Arrest of the Huguenot, thanks to which he will obtain the title of Academician), daily life scenes, portraits and many Normandy’s landscapes. When he returned from his trip, he made a decisive statement for his career: "There, I tried all kinds of painting [...], and I came to the conclusion that I have mostly talent for landscapes and scenes of everyday life, which I will exploit in the future."

In the summer of 1874, Ilya Repine and Vasily Polenov followed the advice of their preceptor Bogoliubov and went to Normandy in quest for spontaneous impressions. There, they would mainly work outdoors, according to the influence of the Barbizon School. They spent several months in the company of other Russian artists in Veules-les-Roses, a setting combining cliffs by the sea and countryside. He completed his European work by returning to Paris, devoting himself to historical subjects after this momentous period of his career dedicated to Norman landscapes. In the late 1870s, Polenov concentrated on painting following the realist tradition of Aleksey Savrasov and Fyodor Vasilyev. He attempted to impart the silent poetry of Russian nature, related to daily human life and his paintings generally reflect his sensitivity and delicacy, combining harmony and appeasement but also nostalgia.

Vasily Polenov's European residential school ended prematurely because he took part in the Russo-Turkish War (1877–1878) as a war artist.

== The Wanderers’ movement and the Abramtsevo Circle ==
During the 1880s, his work was spotted by Vladimir Stassov, a supporter of the traveling exhibition society (the Wanderers), which he joined then. This artistic movement was born from the desire to break with the themes imposed by the Academy to better represent contemporary concerns. In addition, the members promote the accessibility of art among the people by organizing traveling exhibitions (not limited to the artistic centers of Moscow and St. Petersburg). Through their eminently realistic painting, they seek to denounce the living conditions of the Russian population and to promote greater literacy. His works won the admiration of Pavel Mikhailovich Tretyakov, who acquired many of them for his gallery. He was one of the first Russian artists who achieved a plein air freshness of color combined with artistic finish of composition (Moscow Courtyard, 1878; Grandmother's Garden, 1878; Overgrown Pond, 1879). The principles developed by Polenov had a great impact on the further development of Russian (and especially Soviet) landscape painting.

He also began to attend retreats of the Abramtsevo circle. The name comes from the village where the property of Savva Mamontov is. Savva and Vasily had met a decade before in Italy and were now ready to create together surrounded by artists from all disciplines. The very essence of this place was to give freedom of creation, renouncing to academic aesthetic canons. Savva Mamontov would animate his workshops based on traditional art and Russian folklore.

There, all art practices were combined: painting, architecture, music but also decorative and popular arts such as wood crafting and ceramics. In addition to Polenov, the main artists that took part of the circle were Repin, Viktor Vasnetsov, Constantin Korovin, Mikhail Vrubel, Elena Polenova (Polenov's younger sister, a brilliant watercolourist and ceramist), Mikhail Nesterov, Maria Iakountchikova (future sister-in-law of the artist) ...

Abramtsevo even received the nickname of "Russian Barbizon". The Neo Russian style was born within this estate, premise of the national Art Nouveau. Polenov painted among others in Abramtsevo, The Birch Alley in the Park, In the Boat (1880), La Voria (1881) and The Upper Pond in Abramtsevo (1882). He also worked in stage design. Most notably, he decorated Savva Mamontov's mansion in Abramtsevo and his Russian Private Opera. Later, in 1910–1918, Polenov was involved in a folk theatre project.There he met his future wife, Natalia (1858–1931), Maria Iakountchikova's sister.

In 1881, Polenov undertook a trip to the Middle East and Egypt to work on the biblical theme. He hopes to find details of daily life and landscapes that will inspire him to represent the life of the Christ. He painted many studies about scenes of the life of Christ but the most famous is Christ and the sinner, his lifetime masterpiece. This painting is considered as the work of his life for both his artistic career as for the realization of his dearest wishes. He first made a real-sized preparatory study in the mansion of Savva Mamontov in Moscow before directly painting the final work that will be part of the fifteenth itinerant exhibition of the winter of 1887. Alexander III will buy it, making the painter financially at ease after this sale.

From 1883 to 1895, Polenov coached many young artists at the Moscow School of Painting, Sculpture and Architecture. His most talented students are Abram Arkhipov, Isaac Levitan, Konstantin Korovin and Alexander Golovine. The artist was very important to the teaching of the technique, being very demanding on the quality of colors and canvases. In 1893 he became a member of the Academy of Fine Arts in St. Petersburg. Polenov was elected a member of the St.Petersburg Academy of arts in 1893.

== The Artist’s studio museum, the House of the Oka ==
In the late 1880s, Polenov dreamed of a house-museum in the countryside in order to spread the benefits of a rich cultural life. He wanted to create his own place of creation and education but also a place where he could expose the archaeological and artistic collections gathered by his family along the decades. In 1889, he made a trip to the area of Taroussa, 130 km south of Moscow, with his friend and disciple Constantin Korovine. Struck by the beauty of the place, he decided that he will make his dream true there, on the banks of the river Oka. Thanks to the purchase by Tsar Alexander III of his painting Christ and the sinner (1884) for the amount, huge at the time, of 30 000 rubles, he bought a sandy hill overlooking the river, not far from the small village of Bekhovo.

The house, built based on the model his childhood's house in Imotchentsy, was completed in 1892. It is a large three-storey wooden building. He realized himself the plans the design of it and the general style approaches Art Nouveau, which he himself called "Scandinavian", mixing Romanesque and Gothic architecture but also Western medieval style. From the outside, the house remains very original by multiplying volumes and facades, varying the roofs’ shapes and sizes. The ground floor is occupied by common rooms (library, dining room, games room). On the upper floors are the living rooms, Polenov's workshop and his wife's office. Large windows are arranged to admire the view of the Oka and Taroussa at the time. Since then, the trees planted by the artist, his children and local peasants, are closing a little bit the view but offers a dense forest. Pines mainly grew up on this sandy land. Little by little, he also built annexes: a cart shed, stables, a house for the workers, "the admiralty", intended to be the house for the boats (today the room is dedicated to the diorama), a small isba for children, and finally Polenov's final workshop, "the abbey" a large brick building to be his last studio (it was also used for theatrical performances).

Paying tribute to the family's humanist tradition, the Polenov improved the living conditions of the surroundings ’populations. Struck by the pitiful state of schools and the difficult living conditions of the teachers, with his wife they built two schools and organized cultural trips to Moscow for the instructors. To meet the needs of the peasants, they also build a church of which Polenov is the architect. Children from surrounding villages are regularly invited to theatrical performances at the estate, "Old Borok". In 1918, after the Revolution, the house-museum became the first national museum and was renamed Polenovo after the death of the artist, in 1927. Polenov's great-granddaughter Natalia Polenova has been a director of Polenovo since 2011.

== Paintings ==
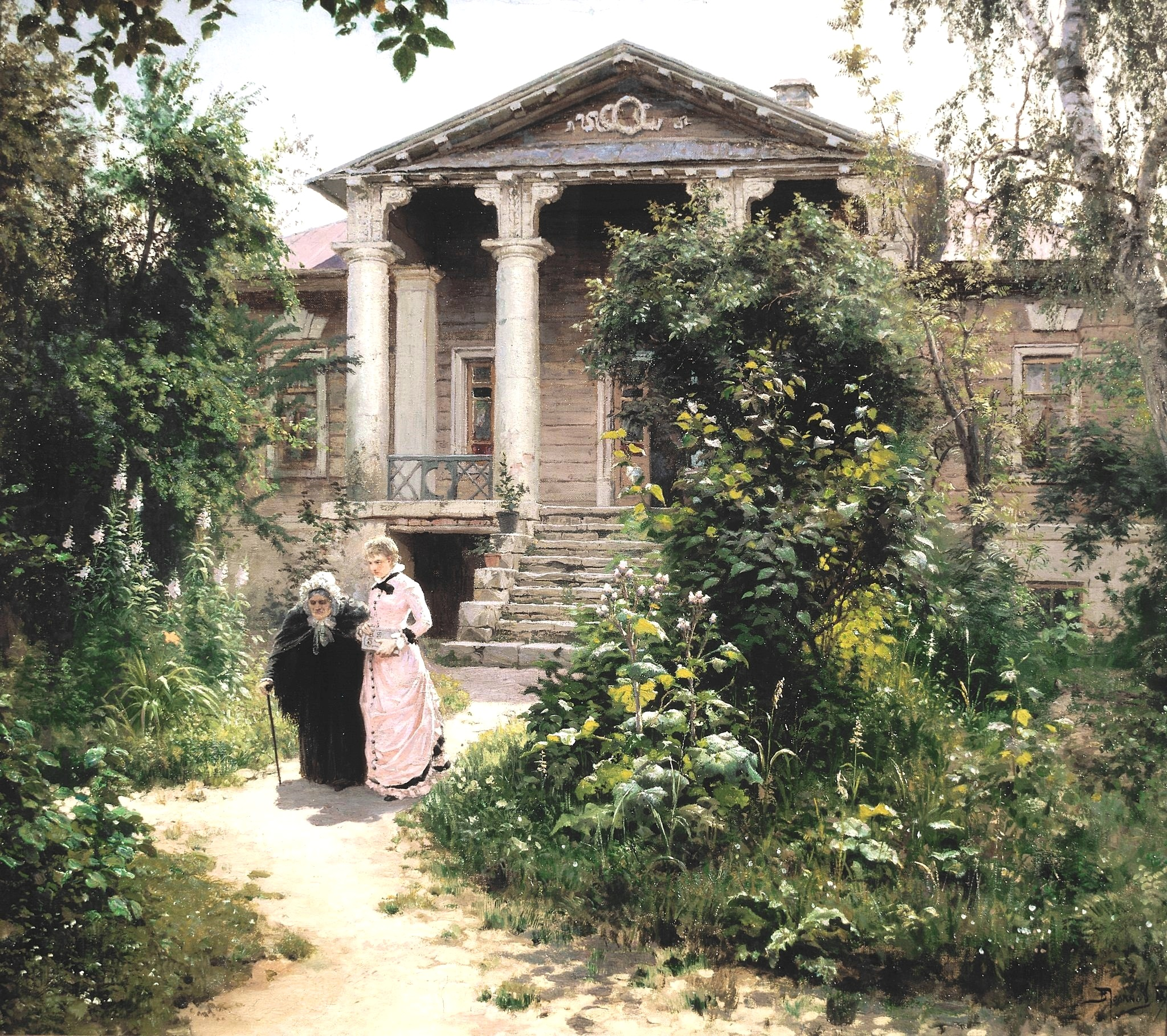
Grandmother's Garden (1878), Tretyakov Gallery

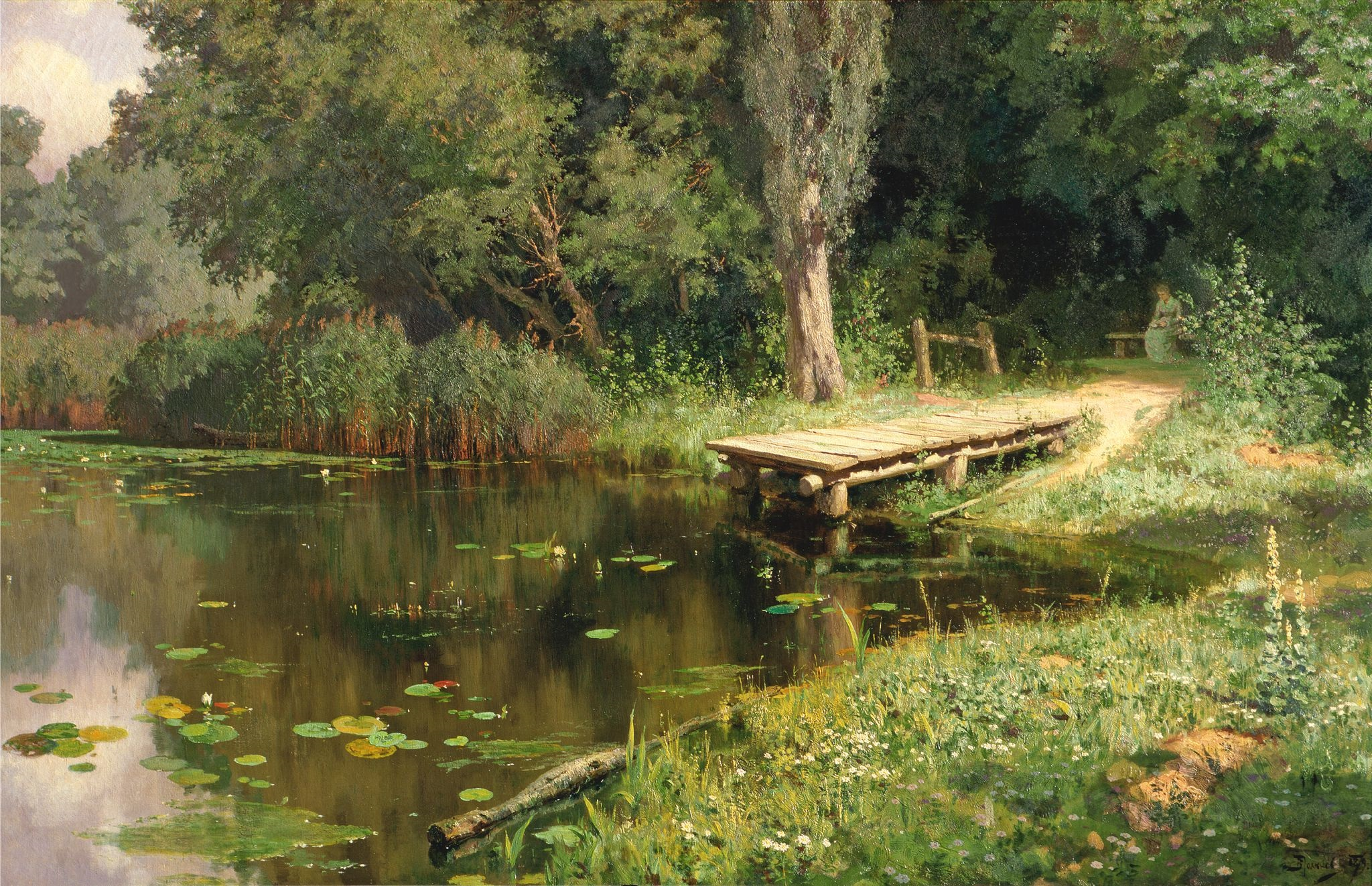
Overgrown Pond (1879), Tretyakov Gallery

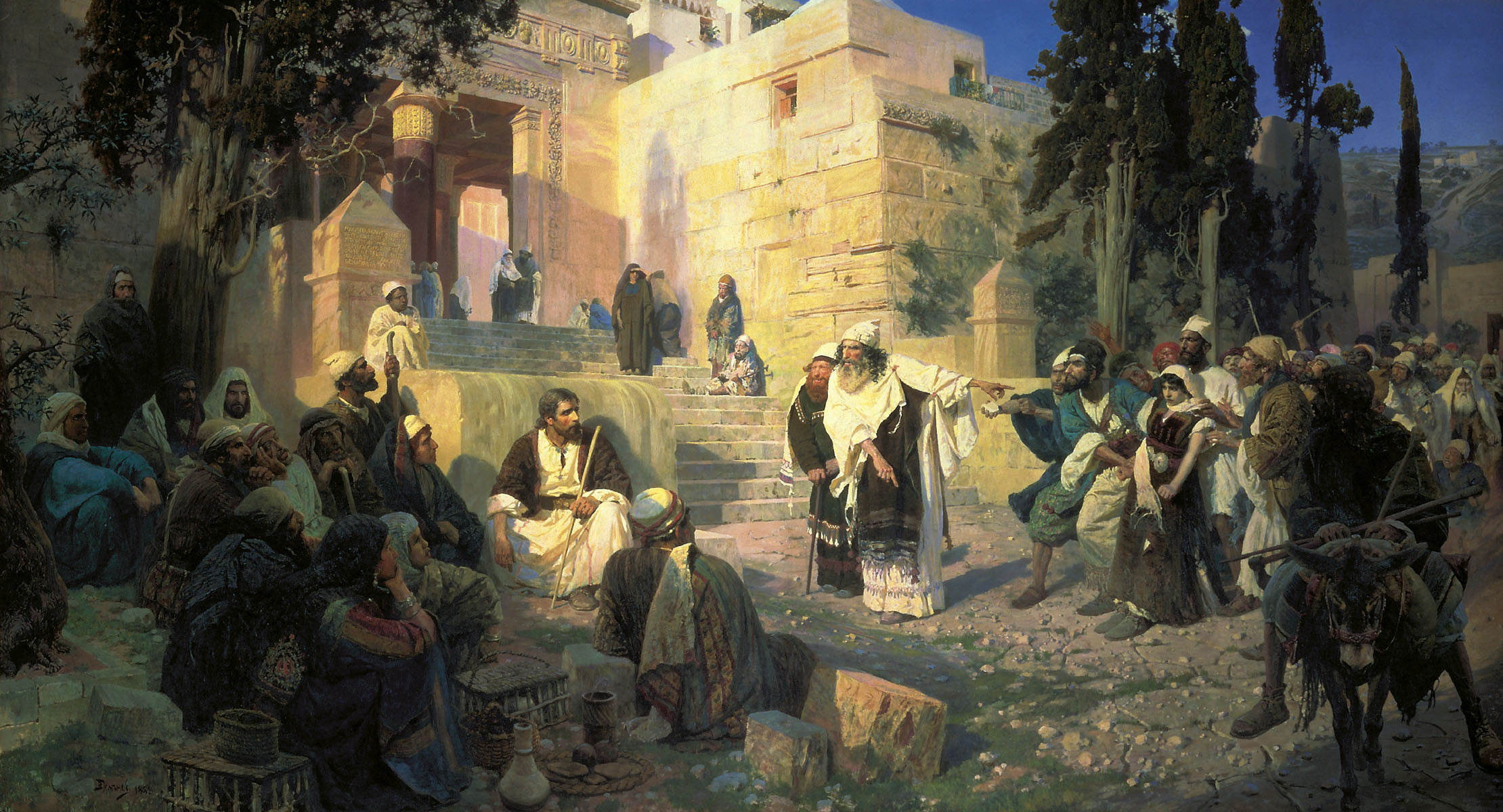
Christ and the woman taken in adultery (He that is without sin?), 1888, Russian Museum

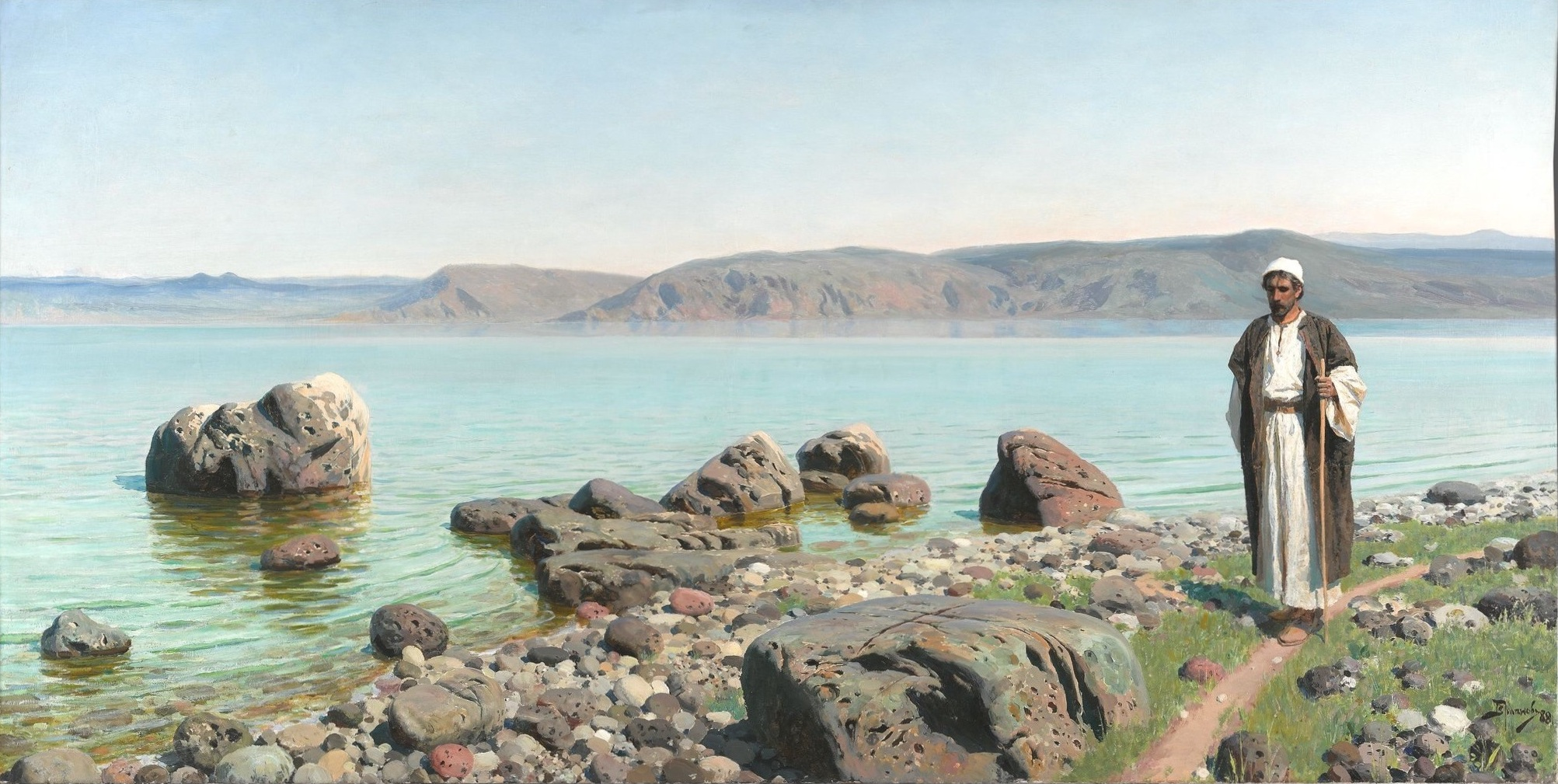
On Lake Tiberias (1888), Tretyakov Gallery

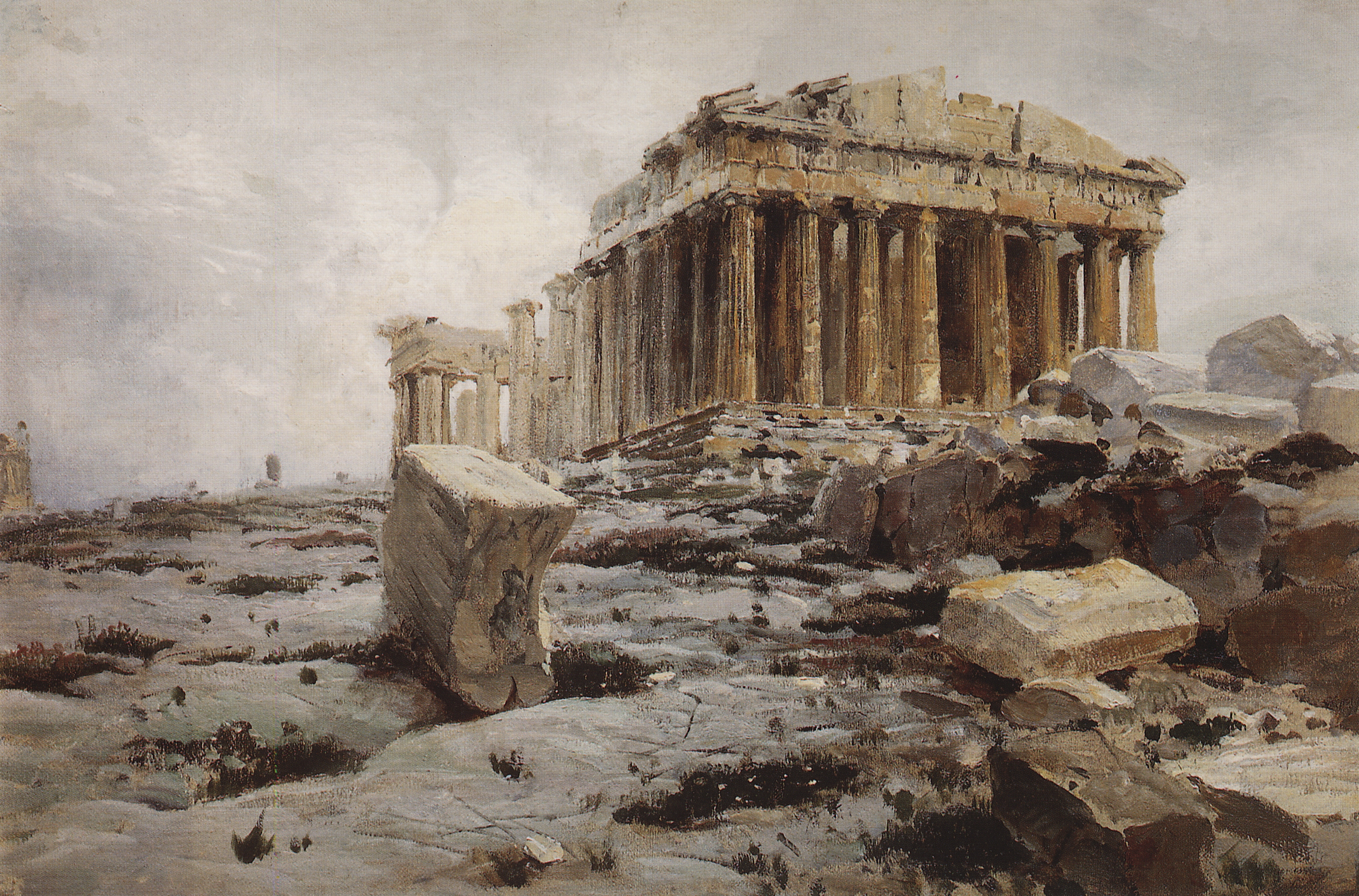
Parthenon (1881–1882), Tretyakov Gallery

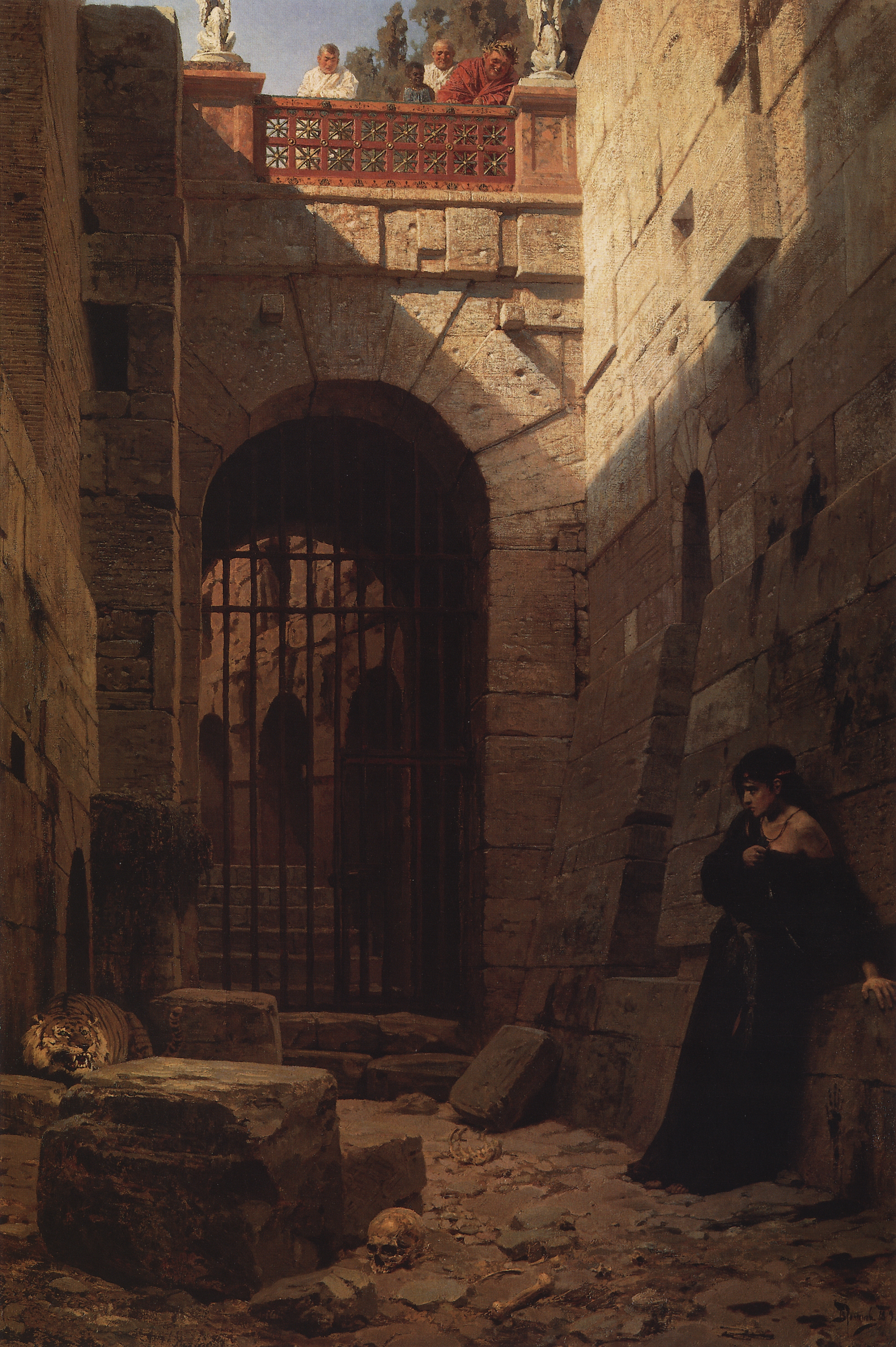
Caesar's joy (1879), Tretyakov Gallery

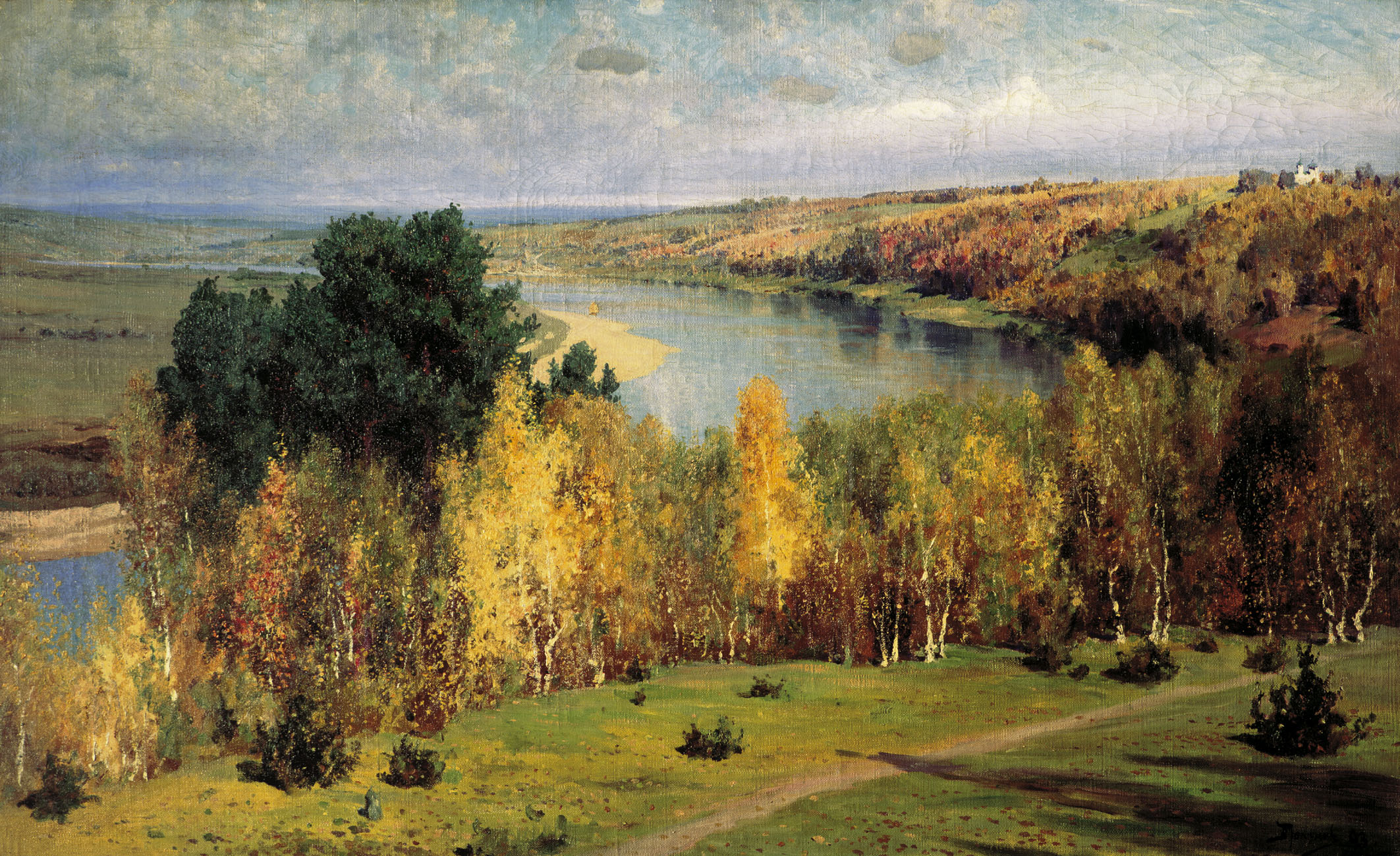
Golden Autumn (1893), Polenovo

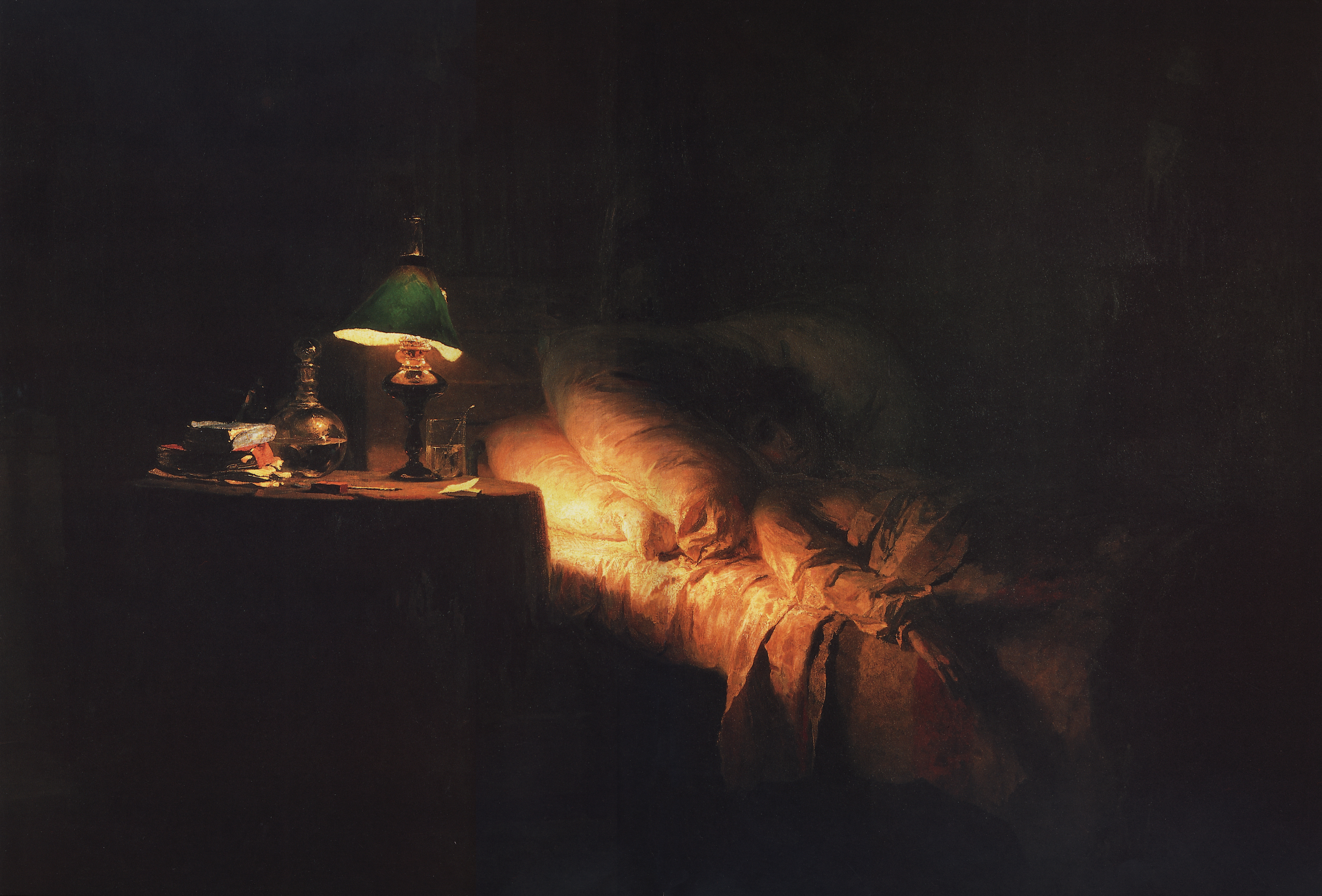
Sick Girl (1886), Tretyakov Gallery

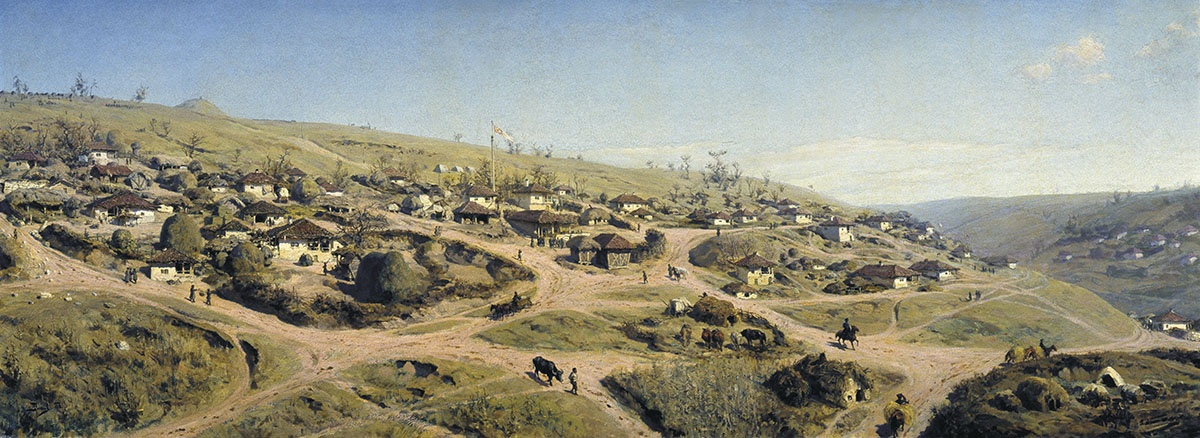
Brestovets (1878), Tretyakov Gallery

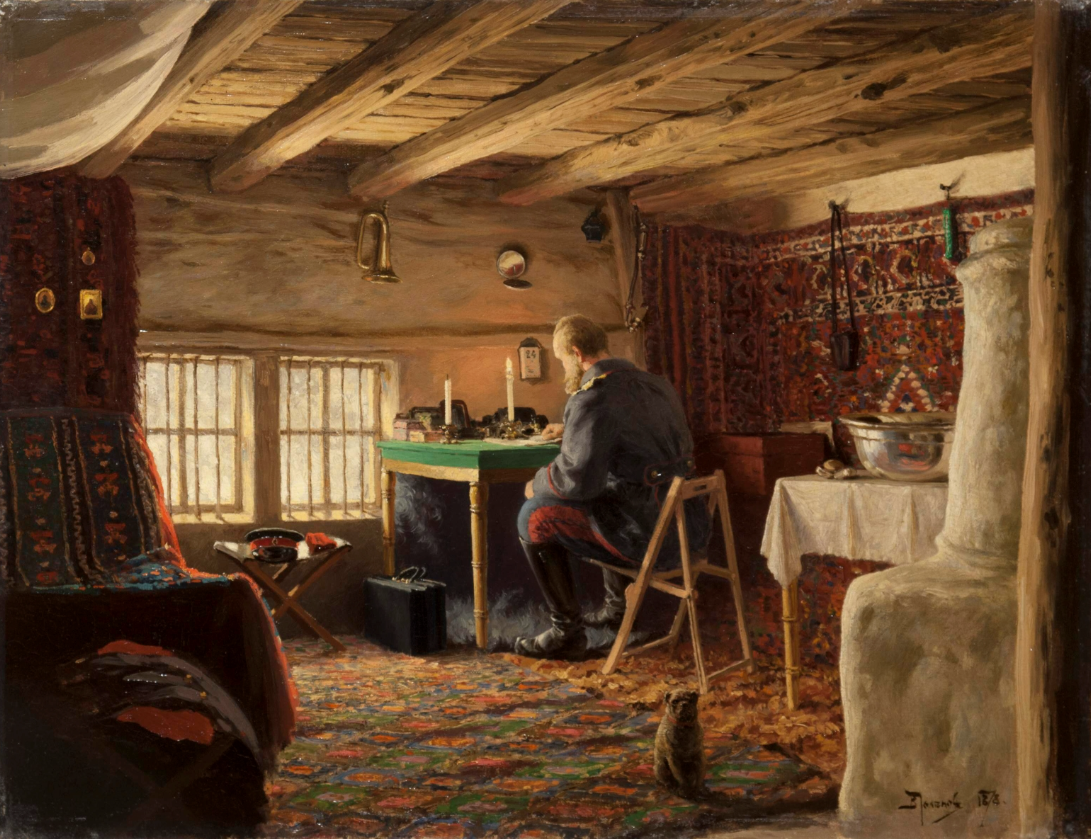
Room of Grand Duke Alexander Alexandrovich, Commander of the Rusçuk Detachment in Brestovets (1878), Russian Museum

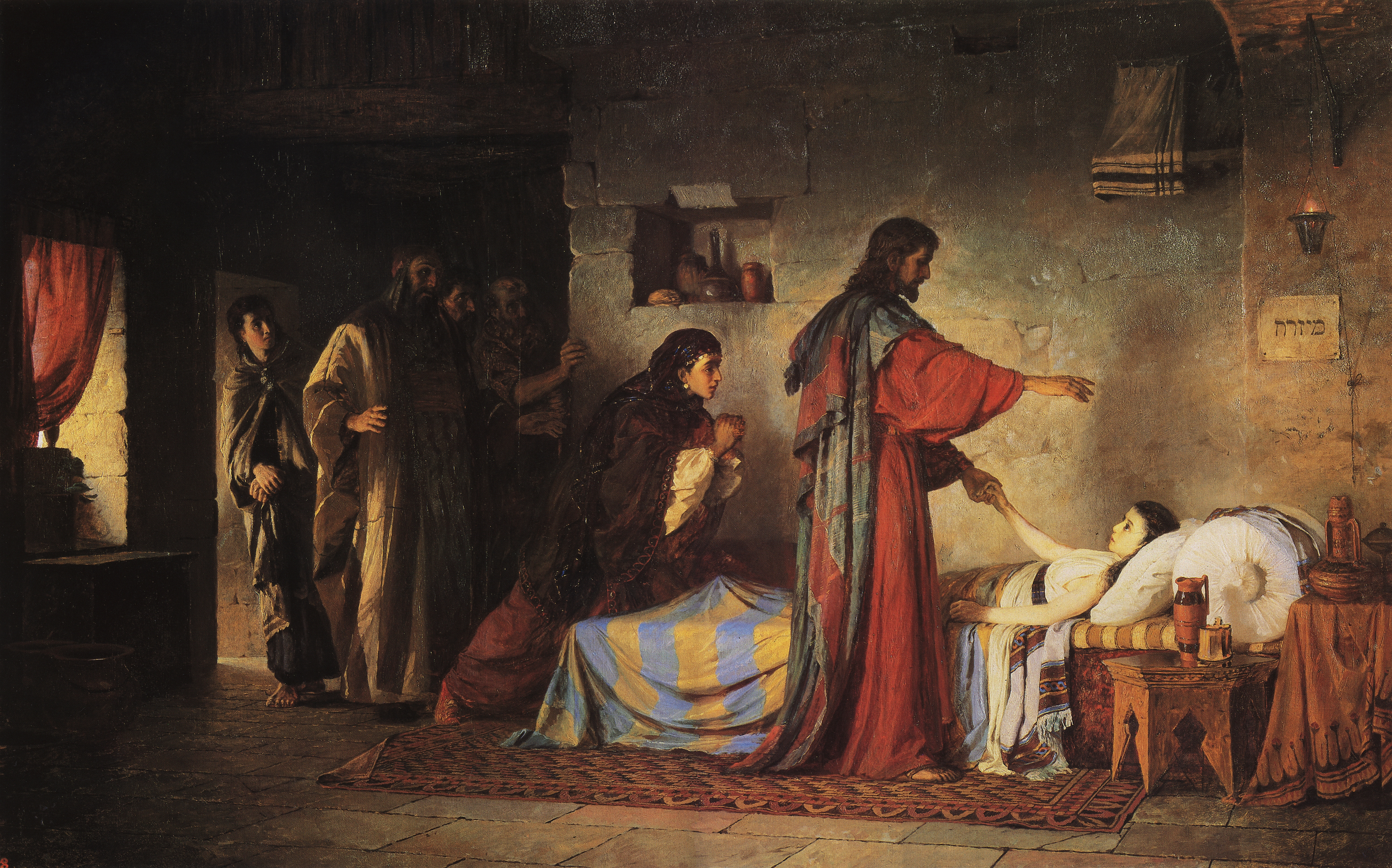
Raising of Jairus' daughter (1871), Scientific-research Museum of the Russian Academy of Arts

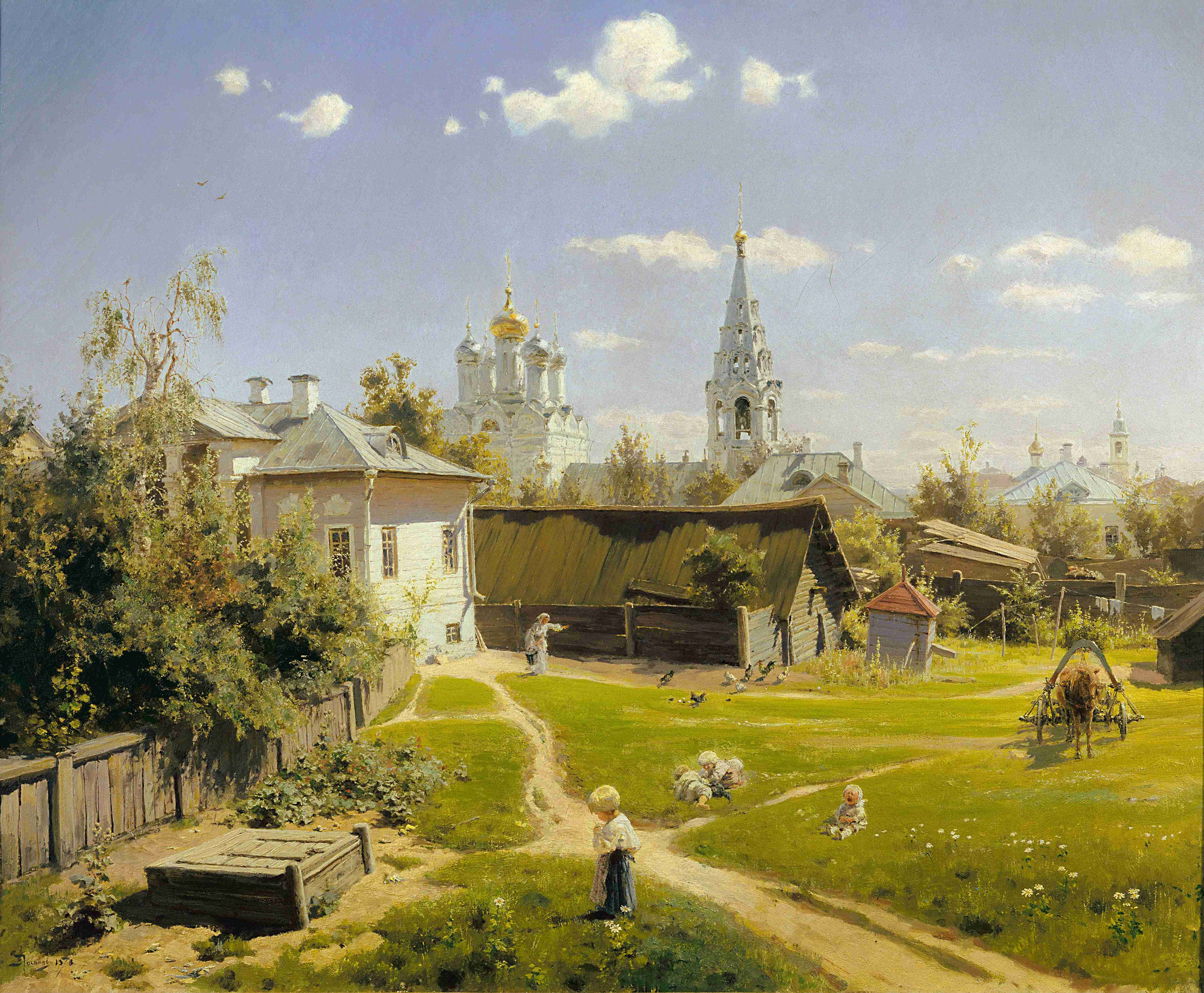
Moscow Courtyard (1878)

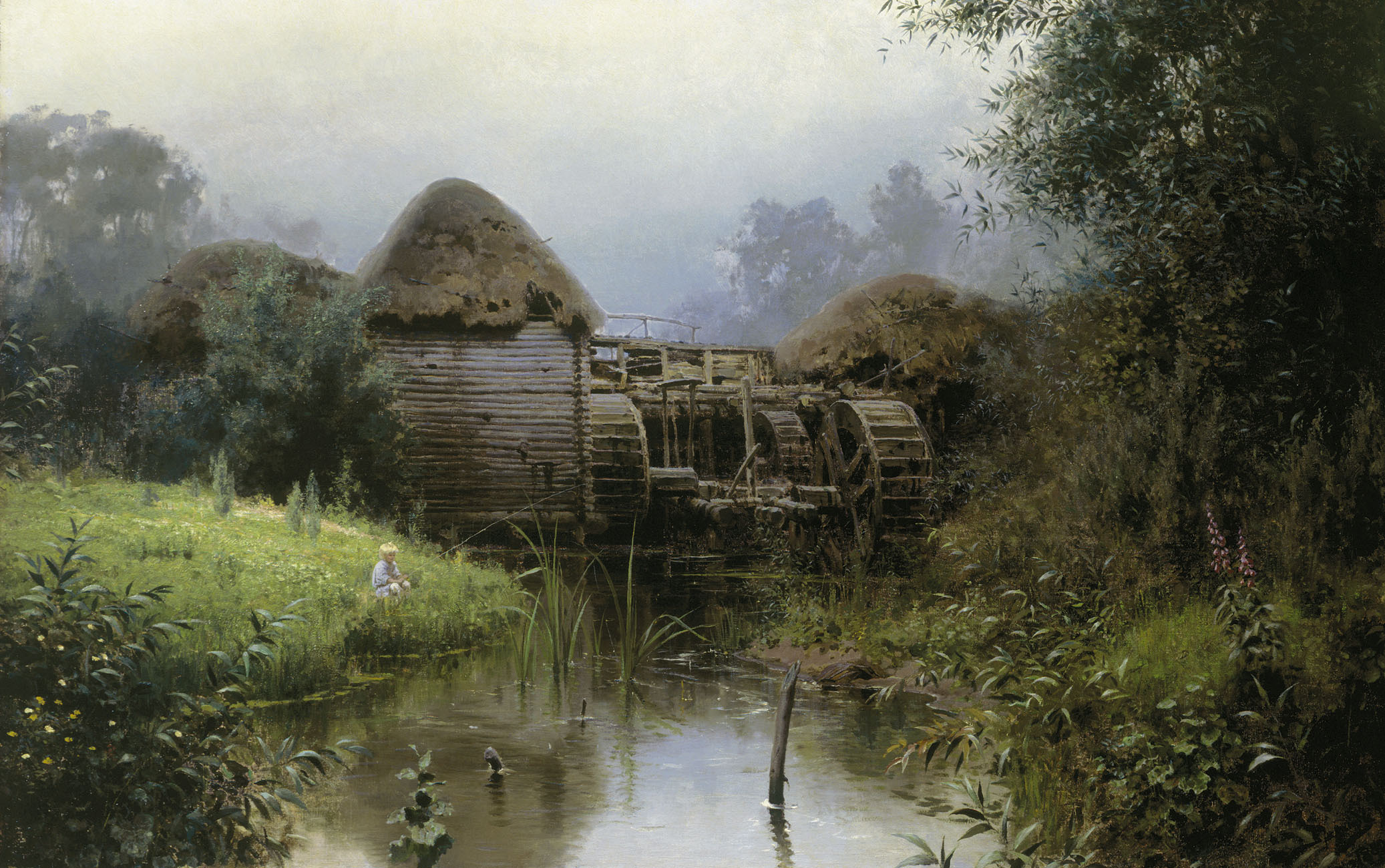
Old mill (1880)

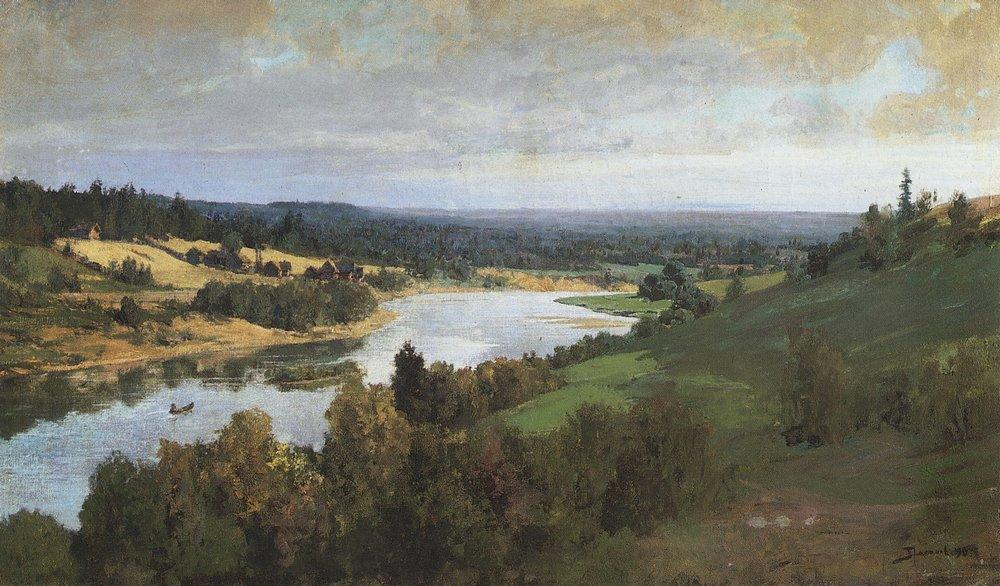
Oyat river (1885)

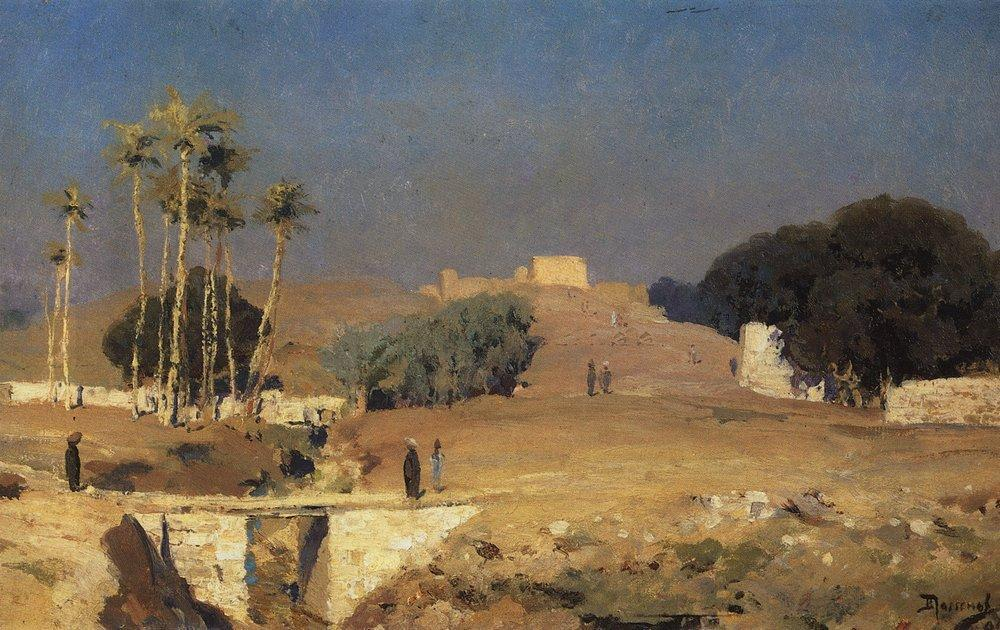
Over the old Cairo (1882)

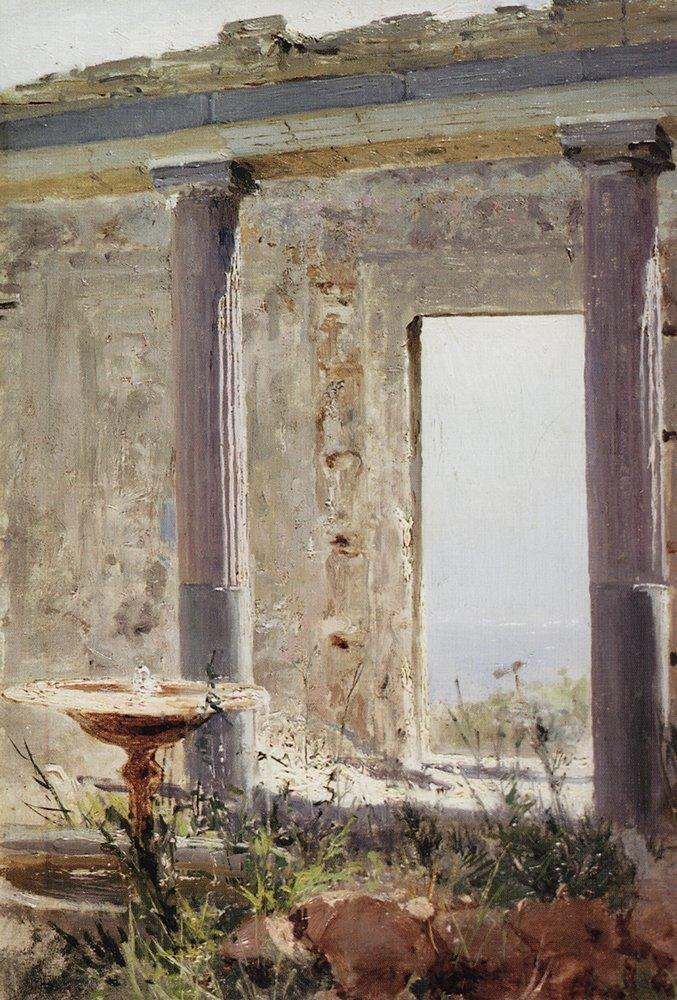
The ruins of the palace in Palestine (1882)

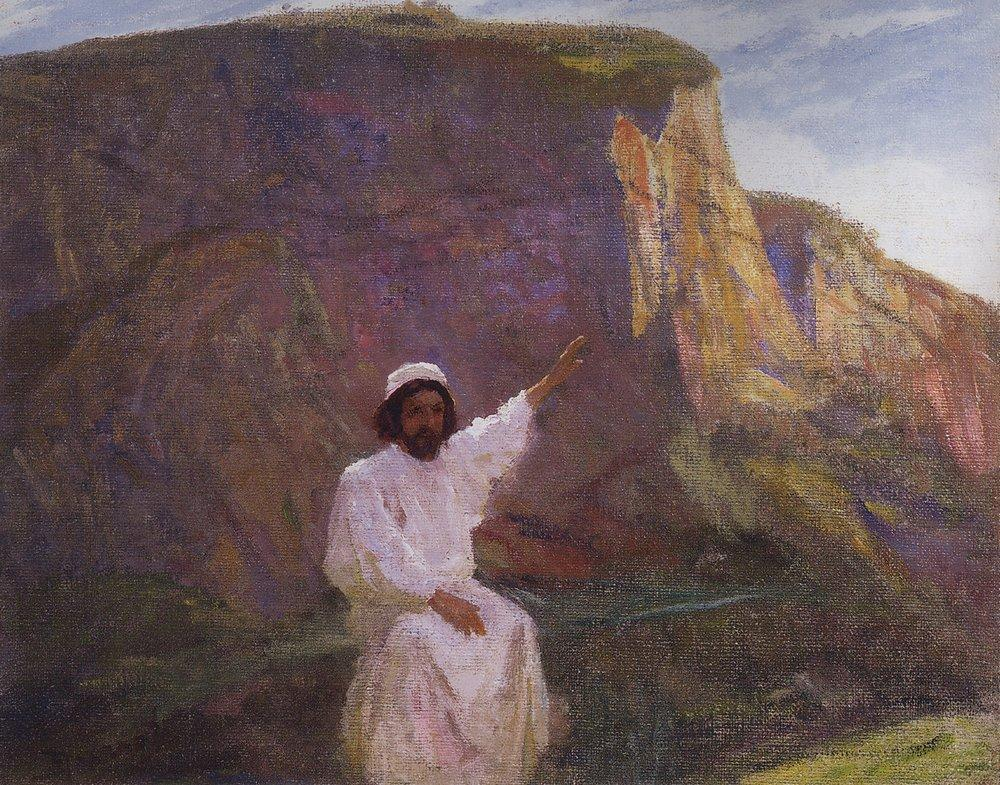
Palestine. Sermon on the Mount (c. 1900)

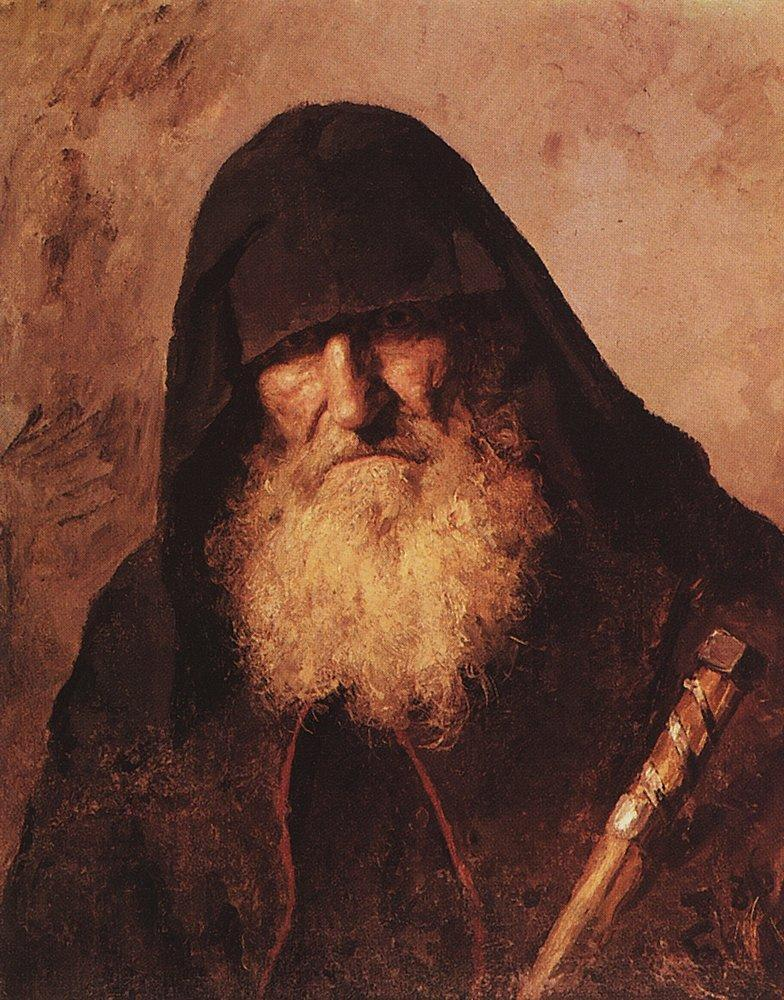
Palestine monk (1886)

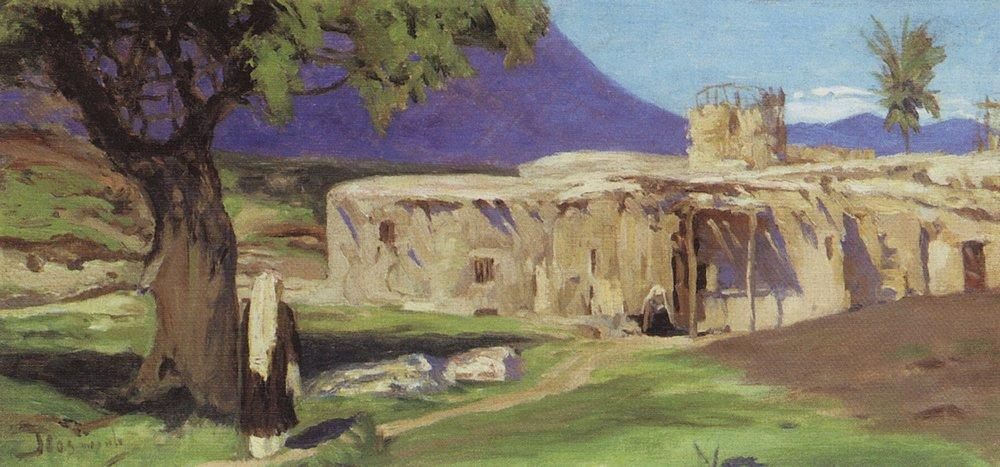
Palestine study (?)

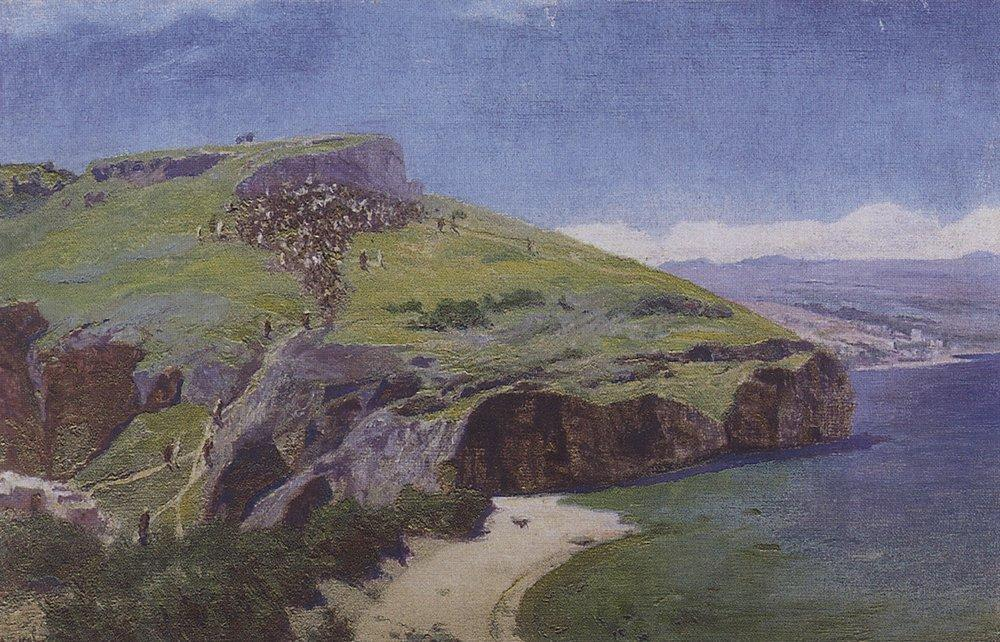
Palestine landscape (c. 1885)

== See also ==
- Asteroid 4940 Polenov, named after Vasily Polenov
- List of Orientalist artists
- Orientalism
