= Aleksey Zhilin =

Russian composer

Aleksey Dmitriyevich Zhilin
- Алексей Дмитриевич Жилин
- Born: 1766?
- Died: before 1848
- Citizenship: Russian
- Occupation: Composer

Aleksey Dmitriyevich Zhilin (c. 1766, Kursk Province – 1848, Moscow) was a Russian composer and multi instrumentalist. Blind from the age of 6 months old, he was the Kapellmeister and orchestra director at the Institute for Blind Workers in St Petersburg from 1808 to 1818. Thereafter he resided in Kursk and Moscow. His published compositions include six polonaises, six marches, and several quadrilles, waltzes, écossaises, songs, and works for piano. However, not many are preserved and very little has survived to the present. There is also no visual record of what he looked like, as no paintings were ever produced during his lifetime.

== Biography ==
Aleksey Zhilin was born in the Kursk Province in 1766 to a well-off family of Russian nobility. However, around six months, he began experiencing rapid hearing loss and soon became completely deaf. Despite this setback, he attached himself to music quite early and proved himself to be adept at playing instruments, learning the cello, violin, and piano all without a teacher. He also is said to have had a wonderful memory which helped him to not only learn quickly and master technical maneuvers as well.

He was married twice, and had one child with his second wife. This is noted by Tolstoy in his work Prisoner of the Caucasus.

In 1820, he retired after 10 years of teaching to Volodimirov (Volodimirovka), Kursk in the Verkhneploskovsky Selsoviet of Pristensky District.

In the early 1830s, he was reported to have left Kursk, never to return. He then settled in Odessa, Ukraine where, in 1831, he gave several concerts of his own music.

Following his performance career in Odessa, he moved again. This time to Moscow and in 1837 gave his final, public performance at the House of Unions. He then spent the remainder of his life organizing private musical affairs for Russian gentry.

Aleksey Zhilin died around 1848 and is regarded as one of the unknown masters of vocal and instrumental compositionalism. He is also a contributor to the development of the Russian romance genre.

== Publishing ==
Much of his music is no longer available in any print form or manuscript form. But during his career, he had two known publications produced which included many of his works. During his lifetime, many of his works were published in musical magazines which were bought on subscription throughout Western Russia.

In 1810, a publication was produced which was dedicated to Zhilin's vocal works.

In 1814, another publication, entitled Erato after the Greek muse of poetry and passion, was produced which compiled more of Zhilin's vocal works. It was produced by the composer himself.

== Career ==
Known to be a contemporary of the Austrian composer Johann Nepomuk Hummel, Zhilin was primarily involved in piano music, writing everything from challenging concert pieces to hearty, salon works.

Aleksey was lauded for his highly developed, piano musicianship and both his compositional and recital concerts throughout Western Russia were well attended during his lifetime. He was most applauded for his fantasies, of which whose thematic deamour were usually contemplative and melancholic. Despite his lack of contemporary attention, during his lifetime he was considered to be one of the most excellent performers of 18th century Russia.

It is noted that Alexander Pushkin was a tremendous fan and advocate of Zhilin's musical aptitude and compositions. This affiliation helped his music get performed in concert halls and salons across Russia.

His popularity was also enhanced as well due to one his most famous romances, "Baby, wearing a film asked" being featured in Platon Grigorievich Obodovsky's five-act, melodrama "Belisarius," a work that had amassed incredibly prestige and became a canon piece of repertoire at The Bolshoi Theater for a time.

In 1808, Zhilin was invited to teach at St. Petersburg Institute for Blind Workers and once there, developed a fully-functioning orchestra, along with training composers and musicians as well. While there, he had written his work "Hymn of the Blind," a work that has not survived to the present.

During the "Patriotic War" of 1812, or Bonaparte's Invasion of Russia, Zhilin often gave speeches and had donated all the royalties of his piano collections to those injured in the war.

In 1815, he began giving concerts in St. Petersburg with a preset collection of self-written compositions, following this with performances in Moscow.

In 1816, Zhilin became the head of the Music department at the St Petersburg College for the Deaf. He worked there for ten years before retiring.

== Compositions ==
=== Romances ===
- Мамотка, гилем нося, просил [Baby, wearing a gilm asked]
- Как на дубчике два голубчика [Like Two Doves on a Stick]

=== Instrumental ===
- Гимн слепых [Hymn of the Blind]

=== Collections ===
- 1810: [collection of his songs were published, what the name was or what publisher is not known]
- 1814: Erato, Collection of Romances, published by Zhilin himself

=== Fantasy ===
- Невское гулянье [Nevsky's Walk]

== Recordings ==
1. Like Two Doves on a Stick, Melodiya (Dmitry Blagoi, 2016)

== See also ==
- List of Russian composers
- Music of Russia
- Russian romance
