= Yelena Polenova =

Russian artist (1850–1898)

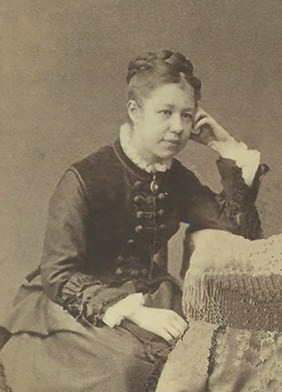
- Yelena Polenova (1874)
- Born: November 15, 1850; Saint Petersburg, Russia
- Died: November 7, 1898 (aged 47); Moscow, Russia
- Known for: Painting, Illustration
- Movement: Art Nouveau

Yelena Dmitrievna Polenova (Russian: Елена Дмитриевна Поленова; 15 November 1850 – 7 November 1898) was a Russian painter and graphic artist in the Art Nouveau style. She was one of the first illustrators of children's books in the Russian Empire. Her brother was the landscape painter Vasily Polenov.

== Biography ==
She was born in Saint Petersburg. Most of her family members were involved in artistic or scientific pursuits. Her father, Dmitriy Vasilevich Polenov, was a historian and diplomat who served as a Privy Councilor. She was raised on the family estates in Olonets Governorate and Tambov Governorate. Her mother, Maria, a writer of children's stories and an amateur artist, provided her first drawing lessons. Beginning in 1859, she and her siblings all received lessons from Pavel Chistyakov.

At that time, women were not admitted to the Imperial Academy of Arts so, at age fourteen, she enrolled at the drawing school operated by the Imperial Society for the Encouragement of the Arts, where she studied with Ivan Kramskoi. From 1869 to 1870, she visited France and took private lessons from Charles Joshua Chaplin.

From 1870 to 1877, she worked in Chistyakov's studios, then took classes in watercolors and ceramics at the Imperial Society, through 1880, with a break when she and her sister were volunteers in a hospital during the Russo-Turkish War. She fell in love with a doctor there, but her family was opposed to marriage. Although she conceded to their wishes, it left her deeply unhappy.

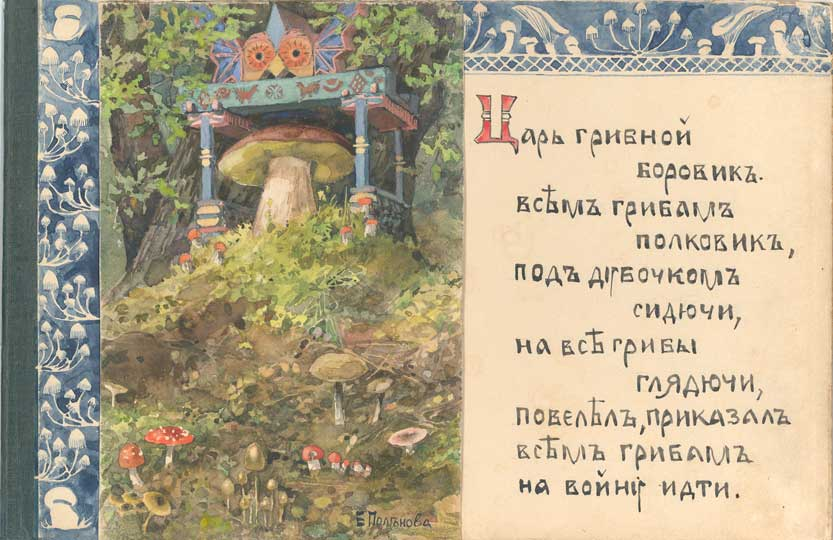
Illustration from "War of the Mushrooms"

She did so well at ceramics that the Society gave her a stipend to study in Paris; something which few women artists received. There, she worked with Théodore Deck and Evdokim Egorov (1832–1891) and had her first exposure to Art Nouveau. Upon returning to Saint Petersburg, she taught porcelain painting and created pieces of Victorian majolica.

=== Abramtsevo Colony ===
After 1882, family circumstances required her to live in Moscow, where she worked as an art teacher and became a member of the "Abramtsevo Colony", a group of artists, musicians and theatrical people who gathered at an estate in Abramtsevo belonging to the Mamontov family. While there, she became interested in folklore and tried her hand at designing costumes. She and her friend Elizabeta Mamontov also worked to create a folk museum, travelling as far as Yaroslavl to make sketches and collect folk tales, and taught classes in traditional crafts to the local peasant families. Together with Viktor Hartmann, Viktor Vasnetsov and others, she helped make Abramtsevo the center of the Arts and Crafts movement in Russia.

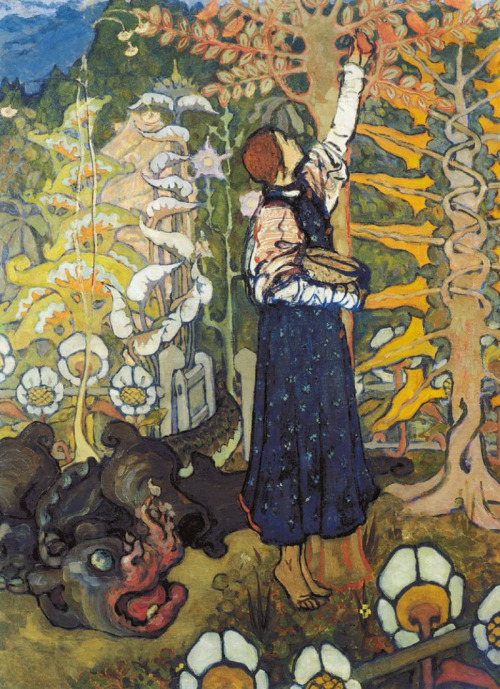
The Beast; one of her most familiar images

In 1886, she made her first illustrations for twenty folk tales collected by Alexander Afanasyev. Although "War of the Mushrooms" (1889) were the only ones published during her lifetime, her work influenced other illustrators such as Ivan Bilibin and Sergey Malyutin. Polenova exhibited her work at the Palace of Fine Arts at the 1893 World's Columbian Exposition in Chicago, Illinois.

After 1893, she spent less time at Abramtsevo and concentrated on designing embroideries, wallpaper, ceramics and other craft pieces. Always a lover of music, she claimed to have "color hearing"; that listening to music made her see ornamental designs.

In April 1896, while riding in a cab on Tsvetnoy Boulevard, her carriage's wheels got caught in the tram rails and overturned. She was seriously injured when her head hit the pavement. Complications from this accident would result in her death over two years later.

In her memory, her brothers established an award of 300 Rubles, to be presented to promising young artists so they could study abroad. Among those who received the award were Konstantin Bogaevsky and Yeghishe Tadevosyan.
