= Isaac Judah Loeb Rabinowitz =

Lithuanian rabbi and scholar

Rabbi Isaac Judah Loeb Rabinowitz (1806 – June 17, 1851) was a 19th-century Lithuanian rabbi and scholar, known for his position at the Vilna rabbinate.

R. Isaac Judah Loeb was born in Kreva, where his father, R. Shemariah Rabinowitz headed a Yeshiva, which had among its students; R. Samuel Strashun, R. Gershon Amsterdam and R. Tzvi Hirsch Katzenellenbogen. In his youth, he studied under the former students of the Vilna Gaon, and later became the Rosh Yeshiva of the Vilna Gaon Beth Midrash. Over the course of his life, he had many responsa addressed to him, and came to be regarded as a leading rabbinic authority of his age. He compiled twenty of the responsa addressed to him in manuscript form, which was published posthumously under the title "Darkei Teshuva". Alongside this, he had also written "Shivli ha-Leket", which was his novellae on the works of R. Asher ben Jehiel. Rabinowitz married Ethel (1810–1888), the daughter of R. Judel ha-Levi of Vilna, with whom he had six children;

- Rose Rabinowitz (1833–1916), wife of R. Samuel Michal Katzenellenbogen (1833–1872).
- Frume Rebekah Rabinowitz (1835–1912), wife of R. Israel Isser Issarlein (1827–1889).
- Jenta Zlate Rabinowitz (1839–1891), wife of R. Abraham Zevi Hirsch Katzenellenbogen (1835–1907).
- Shaina Edel Rabinowitz (1842–1900), wife of R. Elijah Solomon Horowitz-Winogradow (1842–1878).
- Judith Julia Rabinowitz (1847–1925), wife of R. Sundel Shaprio-Rabinowitz (1846–1941).
- R. Shemariah Rabinowitz Robbins (1847–1916), husband of Frume Esther Salinger (1848-1906).
