= Domna Yuferova =

Domna Yuferova (died after 1797), was a Russian industrialist.

She was married to the rich second-guild merchant Nikofor Yurefov (1748–1790) in Sofia in St Petersburg Province. In 1790, she inherited a successful luxury silk manufactory, which had been founded just three years prior and which she managed with success. In 1797, it was reported that the factory's eight weaving machines produced 728 metres of brocade and 1065 metres of fleur to a value of 15000 roubles. Domna Yuferova managed the factory as well as the contacts with the authorities personally. Her career was an unusual; out of fourteen women industrialists in 18th-century Russia, she is one of only four commoners.
