= Marfa Kokina =

Marfa Kokina (died after 1800), was a Russian industrialist.

She managed a tannery in Pinega in the Arkhangelsk Province with her son Akim, having inherited it from her spouse Grigorii. In 1800, it produced 978 pieces of leather to a value of 2090 roubles. She was reportedly an active businessperson, supervising her factory personally. Her career was an unusual: out of fourteen women industrialists in 18th-century Northern Russia, only four where commoners, and out of four female commoners owning factories, she was the only one to have belonged to the meshchanstvo class (lower middle class), the other being female merchants.
