= Saint-Petersburg Elizabethan Institute =

Girls' school in Saint Petersburg, Russia

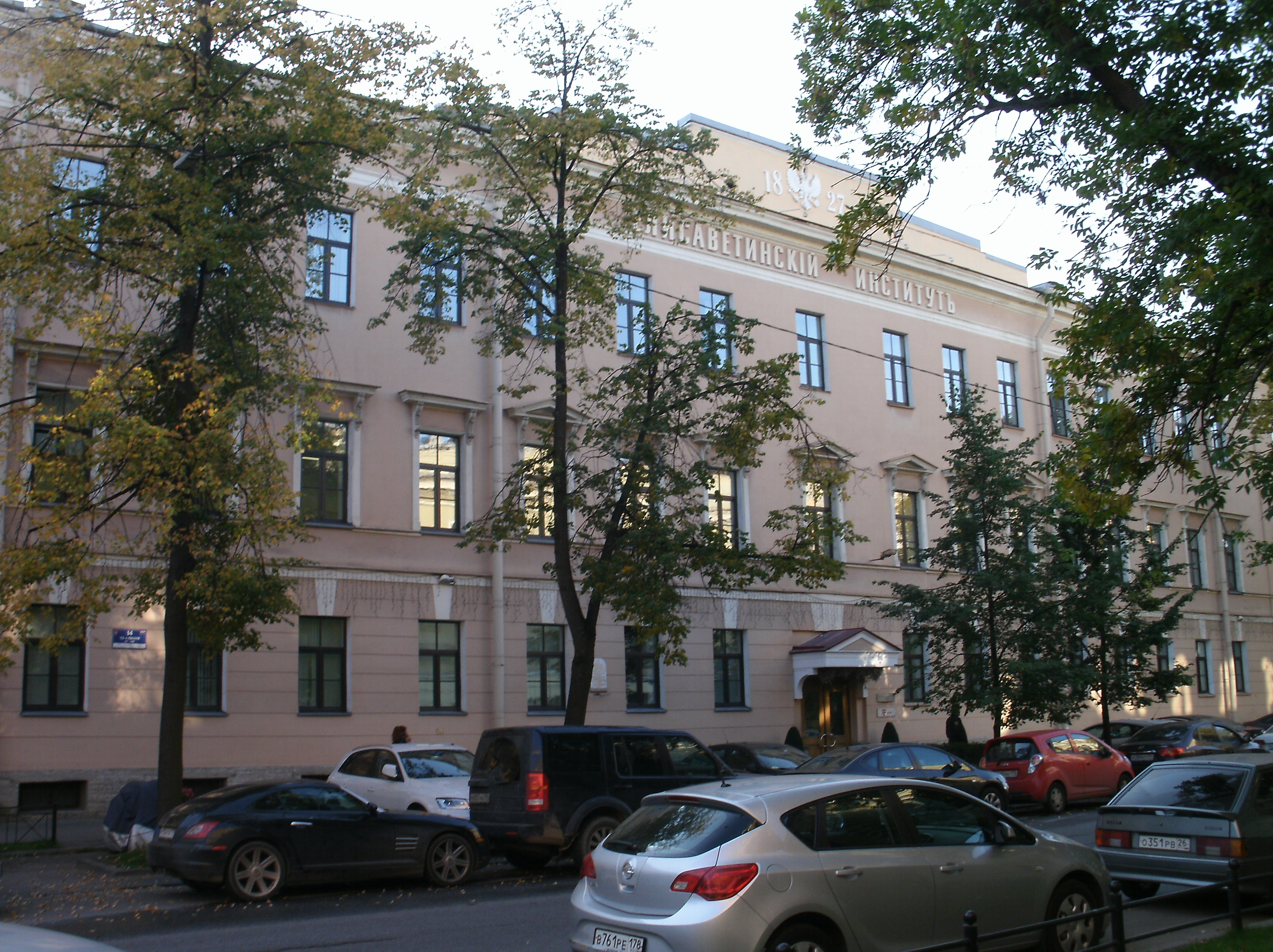
Main building

The Saint-Petersburg Elizabethan Institute (Russian: Санкт-Петербургский Елизаветинский институт) was a girls' school in Saint Petersburg in Russia between 1806 and 1918. It was a charity school, founded by Elizabeth Alexeievna (Louise of Baden) within the Patriotic Society (Russia). Originally a charity school with the purpose of educating the students in handicrafts to make the ideal wives and mothers but with the ability to support themselves if necessary, it became a fashionable girl school in the mid-19th century.
