= Nadezha Shergina =

Russian industrialist

Nadezha Shergina (1765 - after 1803), was a Russian industrialist.

She was married to the rich merchant Grigorii Shergin in Totma. In 1795, she inherited a successful paper mill in Termenga outside Vologda from her father, city mayor Matvei Kolesov. It had been founded by her grandfather Feodorov Kolesov in 1767, was managed by sixteen serfs and circa 20 hired workers and produced writing paper as well as wrapping paper. It is known that she managed the factory and managed the contacts with the authorities herself at least during the first years. Her career was an unusual; out of fourteen women industrialists in 18th-century Northern Russia, she is one of only four commoners.
