= Dmitriy Vasilevich Polenov =

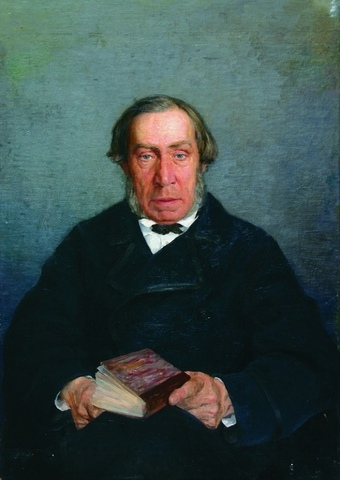
Dmitriy Vasilevich Polenov

Dmitriy Vasilevich Polenov (1806–1878) was the secretary of the Imperial Russian Archaeological Society in Russia in the mid-nineteenth century. His daughter was the artist Elena Dmitrievna Polenova (born Petrozavodsk in 1850).
