= St Petersburg College for the Deaf =

School for the deaf in Russia, 1806 to 1918

Coordinates: 59.9322°N 30.3168°E

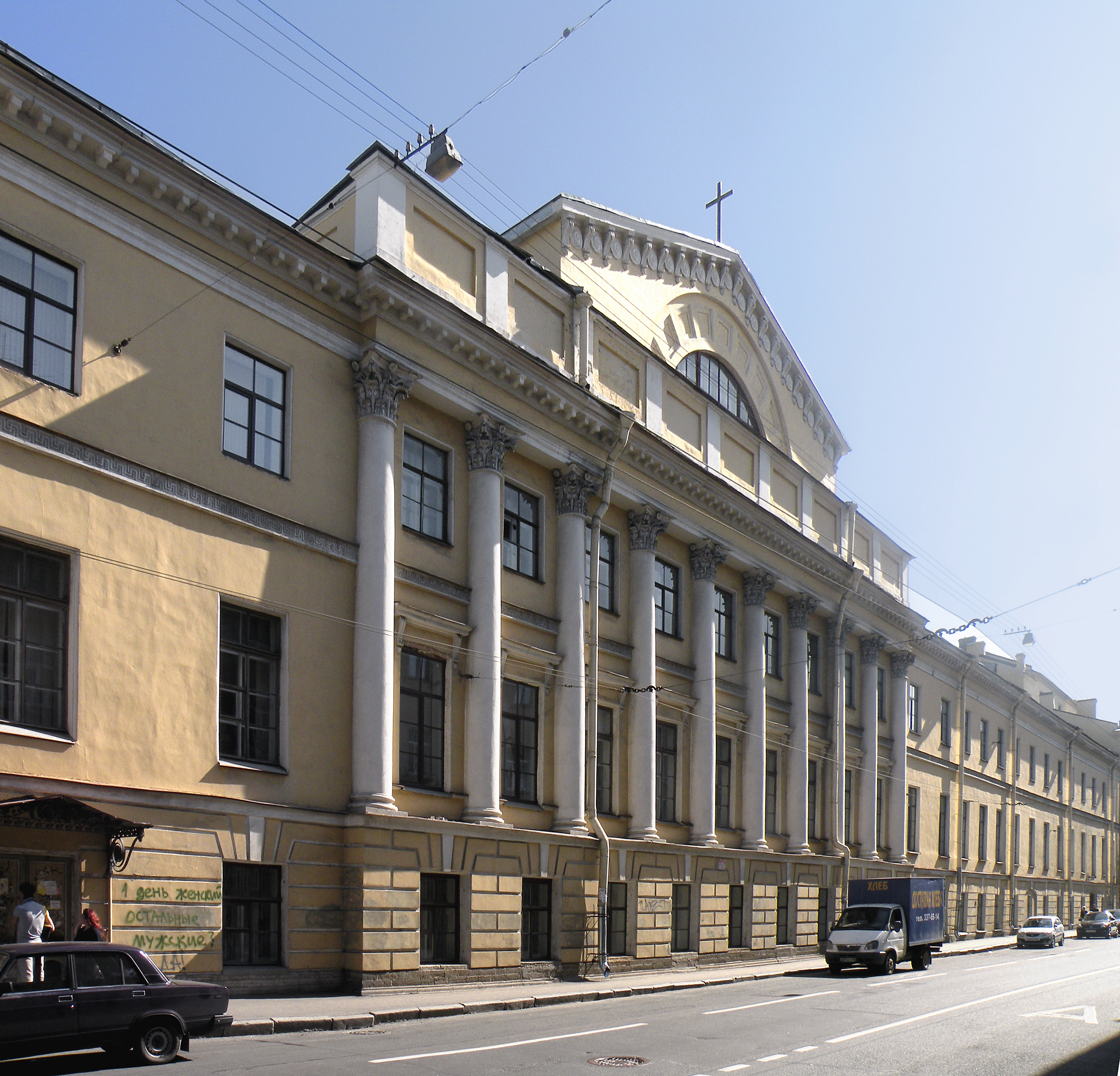
St Petersburg College for the Deaf

The St Petersburg school for the Deaf (Санкт-Петербургское училище глухонемых) was a school for the deaf in Saint Petersburg in Russia between 1806 and 1918. It was the first school for the deaf in Russia. It was founded by empress Maria and a part of the Office of the Institutions of Empress Maria. The purpose of this educational institution was the upbringing and education, both general and handicraft, of children of both sexes who were born deaf and dumb or deaf from illness with loss of speech.

== History ==
The reason for the opening of the first school for the deaf and dumb in Saint Petersburg was the meeting of Maria Feodorovna with a deaf-mute boy Alexander Meller in Pavlovsk Park.To alleviate the fate of this boy and children like him, Maria Feodorovna instructed to discharge one of the most famous professors from abroad in order to establish a school for the deaf and dumb in St. Petersburg. In the same 1806, the priest and professor Vincent-Anselm Zygmunt was discharged from Poland, and he became the first teacher and organizer of educational work at the school for the deaf and dumb.

=== Under the leadership of Maria Feodorovna ===
The school was opened by Empress Maria Feodorovna in 1806, as an experimental school. The plan and staff of the school were approved on October 14, 1806. It was maintained at the expense of the Empress and was initially located in Pavlovsk. The maintenance of the school was 4,500 rubles a year from the funds of Empress Maria Feodorovna. Initially, the school was designed for 12 "deaf and verbal" pupils (6 boys and 6 girls) from among the pupils of the St. Petersburg Orphanage - children from poor families of ministers and raznochintsy, as well as children of noble origin. Among the first students of the school were the nephews of General Akhverdova.

=== Under the jurisdiction of the St. Petersburg Board of Trustees ===
In 1810, by the decision of Maria Feodorovna, the experimental school was transferred to the jurisdiction of the St. Petersburg Board of Trustees and transferred to state maintenance. The school was transferred to St. Petersburg. Its official opening took place on February 22, 1810. At first, the school was located on the Vyborg side, and then moved to the Widow's House, which was located on the territory of the Smolny Monastery. According to the charter of the school, approved on January 1, 1810, it contained 24 children, 12 of whom were pupils of the St. Petersburg and Moscow Orphanages and the same number were private boarders of both sexes aged 7-10 years. The first director of the school was Professor J. B. Joffrey, invited from the Paris Institute for the Deaf and Dumb.

In 1817, by the will of the Empress, a three-storey building at the corner of Gorokhovaya Street and the embankment of the Moika River, next to the Orphanage (modern address: 18 Gorokhovaya Street), was bought from the merchant Kusovkina to accommodate the school. According to the project of P. S. Plavov, the building was rebuilt and included in the complex of the St. Petersburg Orphanage. In 1824, after the death of Joffrey, G. A. Gurtsov became the director of the school.

The school remained the favorite brainchild of the Empress. Maria Feodorovna not only allocated the necessary funds from her personal treasury for the purchase of a large house for the school in St. Petersburg, but also took on the maintenance of half of the students, teachers, supervisors, actively delved into the process of formation and development of the school. The school was repeatedly visited by Alexander I.

=== As part of the Mariinsky Department ===
By the imperial decree of Oct. 26, 1828 (two days after the death of Empress Maria Feodorovna), the St. Petersburg Board of Trustees and its subordinate institutions were transferred to the jurisdiction of the newly formed IV Department of H.I.H. the Chancellery (from 1854 it was called the Department of Institutions of Empress Maria, and from August 12, 1880, the Empress Maria's Own Chancellery for Institutions).

In 1838, V. I. Fleury became the director of the school. On July 30, 1835, a new Charter of the school was approved. After the fire that occurred on July 30, 1840, the school building was again rebuilt according to the project of P. S. Plavov. The school continued to expand: in the 1860s - 1870s, the number of pupils reached 160 (100 boys and 60 girls), paid students (up to 40 children) were also allowed to attend classes. In total, during the period of 1810-1910, 2205 children (1401 boys and 804 girls) studied at the school, of which 1929 people successfully completed the course of study. In 1865, a new charter of the St. Petersburg School was approved. The course was taken for the reorganization of workshops, the improvement of the technical education of students. Children who were incapable of learning began to be taught mainly crafts.

In the summer of 1867^{,} Edward Gallaudet, director of the world's first institution of higher education for the deaf and dumb in Washington, later became Gallaudet University, visited the school. Gallaudet toured the cities of Europe, inspecting schools and orphanages for deaf and dumb children. In his report for the US Department of the Interior, he praised the St. Petersburg institution, noting, in particular, the comfortable summer accommodation of students with teachers in wooden houses on one of the islands near the city, the excellent layout and arrangement of the school itself, as well as a reasonable combination of teaching oral speech and the use of sign language. It is curious that the guide and translator for Gallaudet was 24-year-old K. A. Timiryazev, who was recommended to him as a connoisseur of the English language

In 1898, pedagogical courses were created at the school, which trained deaf teachers. An outpatient clinic was opened at the school to receive patients suffering from diseases of the ear, throat, nose and speech disorders. Evening classes were opened for adults who lost their hearing as a result of the disease, where they were taught lip reading and general subjects.

Teaching methods were also constantly improved. The name of the head of the school, honorary guardian Alexander Karlovich Pel (d. 1887) was associated with the introduction of the revolutionary for that time "oral" method. This innovation of the last quarter of the 19th century contributed to a more effective development of deaf-mute children's communicative abilities and, consequently, the ability to adapt to society. In 1900, at the World Exhibition in Paris, the school received an honorary diploma for the organization of educational work. In February 1910, the school on Gorokhovaya Street celebrated the centenary of its foundation. On February 22, a solemn act was held at the school, which was attended by Empress Maria Feodorovna. On this day, the school was awarded the title of Imperial.

=== After the October Revolution ===
After the October Revolution of 1917, the school was included in the system of Soviet institutions of public education. In 1918, the school was transformed into the Institute for the Deaf and Dumb with a school attached to it. In 1938, the institution was named "Central Boarding School for Children with Hearing and Speech Disorders", in 1948 - "Boarding School No 1 for Deaf Children". Since 1969, it has been located on the territory of the former Lansky estate (Engels Avenue, 4). The building at 18 Gorokhovaya Street was transferred to the Leningrad Pedagogical Institute named after A. I. Herzen.

=== They worked at the St. Petersburg School for the Deaf and Dumb ===
[edit] edit code]

- Jean-Baptiste Joffre
- Gurtsov, Georgy Alexandrovich
- Fleury, Viktor Ivanovich
- Yakov Timofeevich Speshnev
- Ivan Yakovlevich Seleznev
- Stepanov P. I.
- Sipovsky, Vasily Dmitrievich
- Ostrogradsky, Alexander Fedorovich
- Bogdanov-Berezovsky, Mikhail Valeryanovich
- Pyotr Dmitrievich Enko
- Demyanovsky, Valentin Alexandrovich

== The fate of the pupils ==
Many graduates of this school, after graduation, could continue their education in ordinary educational institutions, since they knew oral speech. Some of them served in the civil service, many became teachers at the same school and helped other deaf and dumb people. Many were sent to other cities and organized schools for deaf and dumb students there. Ivan Karlovich Arnold, a pupil of the St. Petersburg School, who lost his hearing in early childhood, in 1825 received a job as an artist in the Imperial Hermitage, and later served as a topographer in the Department of State Property. And in 1860, Arnold founded a school for the deaf and dumb in Moscow at his own expense. There were craftsmen and merchants among the graduates. Deaf-mute children capable of drawing were taught both painting and icon painting. Maria Feodorovna contributed to the fact that the most talented students of the school for the deaf and dumb were sent to study with famous artists. The artist Venetsianov taught a deaf-mute student Alexander Beller, who later became a teacher of drawing at the school and painted twelve icons of feasts for the temple of the school. Some of the most talented graduates continued their studies in drawing at the Academy of Arts and at the Baron Stieglitz Drawing School. In the Church of St. George the Victorious at the General Staff Building on Palace Square, copies of religious paintings from the Hermitage, made by deaf and dumb artists, hung on the walls. One of the graduates of the school became a teacher of artistic calligraphy at the St. Petersburg Trade School. It is known that one of the graduates of the school worked as a draughtsman of medicines at the Holy Cross Community of Sisters of Mercy. A graduate of the school in 1884, Fyodor Shelting served for more than 30 years as a draftsman in the Ship Drawing Room of the Baltic Shipbuilding and Mechanical Plant, and his wife Anna Shelting served for 18 years as a laboratory assistant at the first St. Petersburg microscopic station in Russia at the city slaughterhouses. Since students immediately after graduating from the school could not always immediately find a place of service, and sometimes even a place of residence, an orphanage was created at the school, where they could stay after graduation until the moment when they found a suitable place.

== Church of the Holy Apostles Peter and Paul ==
The church on the third floor of the building of the school for the deaf and dumb was arranged by P. S. Plavov. In the one-tier iconostasis there were four icons by Vasiliev; the altarpiece "Crucifixion" was painted in 1822 by the deaf-mute artist Stepan Sergeev. The consecration of the church took place on February 19, 1821 in honor of Ap. Paul, the heavenly patron of the late husband of the Dowager Empress. After the fire of July 30, 1840, the services were moved to the recreation hall for a while. On June 29, 1844, on the third floor, in the central part of the building, a new church was laid according to the project of P. S. Plavov. On the façade of the building, it was highlighted by a portico of composite semi-columns. Inside, the church was decorated with Ionic columns and pilasters of artificial yellow marble, the choir was supported by powerful consoles. The icons for the two-tiered white and gold iconostasis were taken from the old ones, saved in the fire, the missing ones were painted by the son of the above-mentioned Vasiliev, and the Twelve Great Feasts were painted by the school's pupil, drawing teacher A. I. Beller. The temple was consecrated on May 14, 1847 by Bishop Nathaniel of Reval. The Church was a very important element in the education of deaf and dumb children. Priests served in this church, whose duties included knowledge of sign language of the deaf and dumb. The service was conducted in the usual way, during the service the choir sang, the singing of which could not be heard by the deaf and dumb pupils. The priest did not use sign language during the service, but usually at the most important moments of the service, one of the older students or teachers went to the middle of the church and translated the service into sign language for the deaf. The meaning of the divine service was explained to the students in the lessons of the Law of God with the help of writing or gestures. Naturally, confession was accepted at the school in writing or in sign language. Outsiders were not allowed into this church, but they were placed in the choir of this church. At the beginning of 1918, the church was made a parish church, while sign language interpretation was abolished, and in 1923 the services were completely eliminated.

In 1996, the Orthodox community of the Herzen Pedagogical Institute appealed to the rector with a request to open a church. In 1997, the first Liturgy was served. Since 1999, a permanent priest has been appointed to the church, and regular services have been held. On October 8, 2000, the first Liturgy for deaf and dumb and hard-of-hearing people with sign language interpretation was served. Now there is the only community of the deaf in St. Petersburg at the church. Meetings and classes for the hearing impaired are held weekly. Educational activities are carried out: pilgrimages and excursions, film screenings with subtitles. Every Sunday and on church holidays, Liturgies with sign language interpretation are served for the deaf and hard of hearing. Church sacraments are also performed: baptisms and weddings, funeral services are held. The rector of the temple is Archpriest Dimitry Simonov.
