= Overgrown Pond =

1879 landscape painting by Vasily Polenov

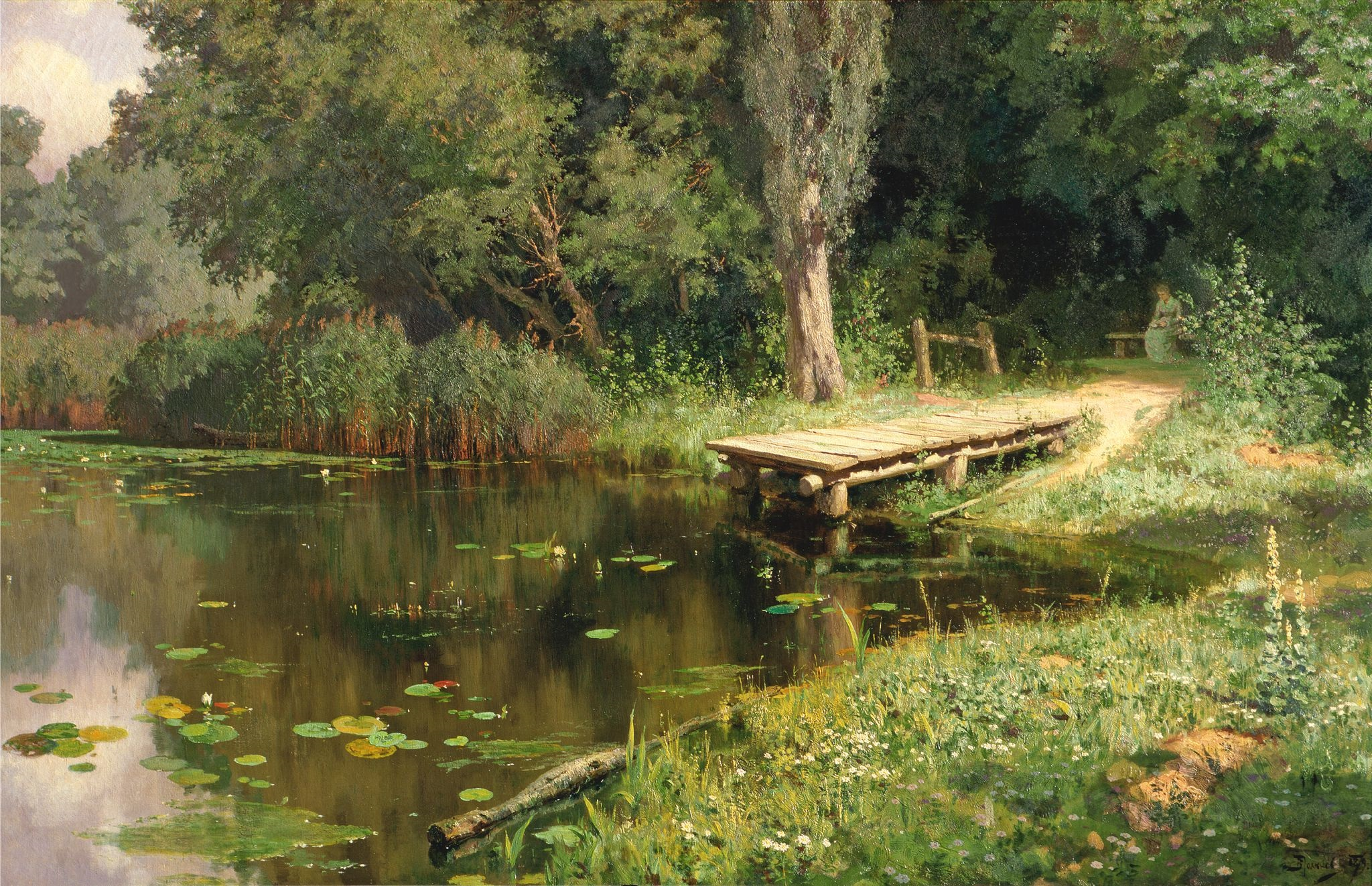
- Artist: Vasily Polenov
- Year: 1879
- Medium: Oil on canvas
- Dimensions: 80 cm × 124.7 cm (31 in × 49.1 in)
- Location: State Tretyakov Gallery, Moscow

Overgrown Pond is a landscape painting by Russian painter Vasily Polenov (1844–1927), completed in 1879. The painting, which measures 80 × 124.7 cm, is part of the State Tretyakov Gallery's collection in Moscow (Inventory No. 10460).

The view depicted on the canvas summarizes the artist's different experiences. Polenov made several studies for the painting in 1877 when he visited his parents in the village of Petrushki near Kyiv. The canvas was completed in early 1879 in Moscow.

The painting Overgrown Pond was exhibited at the Moscow part of the 7th exhibition of the Association of Traveling Art Exhibitions ("Peredvizhniki"), opened in April 1879. For several decades the canvas was in private collections, and then, in 1928, it was acquired by the State Tretyakov Gallery.

Together with two other Polenov's works of the late 1870s – paintings Moscow Courtyard and Grandmother's Garden – canvas "Overgrown Pond" refers to "a kind of lyrical and philosophical trilogy of the artist". According to the art historian Aleksei Fedorov-Davydov, in the painting "Overgrown Pond" Polenov managed "with the greatest force and picturesque beauty" to express "real, but wrapped in a kind of romance poetry of nature". Art historian Tamara Yurova noted that this painting "completed a certain stage of Polenov's work, marked the onset of creative maturity".

== History ==
From 1873 to 1876 Vasily Polenov lived and worked in Paris and then returned to Russia. In 1876, having joined the Russian volunteer army to take part in the First Serbian–Ottoman War, he traveled to the area of combat operations, where he created several drawings based on his battle impressions. In June 1877, the artist came to Moscow and rented an apartment in Durnovsky lane (now Composer street) near the Church of the Transfiguration of the Savior on Peski. It is supposed that there, in the summer of the same year he started working on the paintings "Moscow Courtyard" and "Grandmother's Garden".

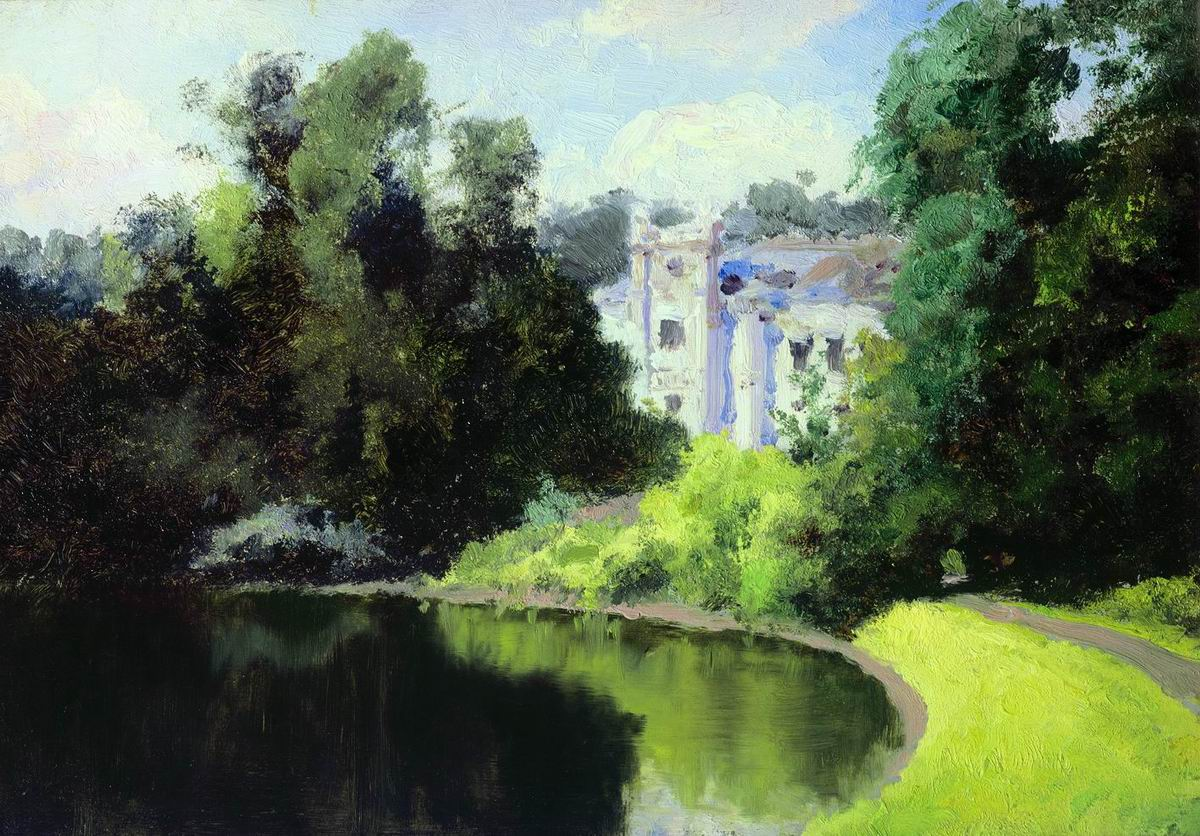
Pond in the park. Olshanka (1877, State Tretyakov Gallery)

On 5 July 1877, the artist's parents, Dmitriy Vasilevich Polenov and Maria Alekseevna, invited him to their dacha, which was located in the village of Petrushki near Kyiv. During a trip to Kiev Governorate, most likely in August, Polenov created several sketches, which were later used by him when working on the canvases "Overgrown Pond" and "Summer". September 1877 Polenov spent in Olshanka, in the estate of his grandmother Vera Nikolaevna Voeikova, located in Borisoglebsky Uyezd Tambov Governorate. There he painted a small painting "Pond in the Park. Olshanka" (wood, oil, 24 × 33.6 cm, State Tretyakov Gallery, Inventory No. 11149).

In late 1877 – early 1878 Polenov was again in the area of military operations. This time, he went to the Bulgarian front of Russo-Turkish War (1877–1878), where he served as an artist at the headquarters of the Russian army. After returning to Moscow, Polenov rented another apartment in Olsufiev's house on Devichye Pole in Khamovniki District. The artist lived there from July 1878 to the fall of 1881, and it was there, at the beginning of the summer of 1878, that he worked on the canvas "Overgrown Pond", completing it in early 1879.

On 23 February 1879, the 7th exhibition of the Association of Traveling Art Exhibitions opened in Saint-Petersburg and lasted until 25 March before moving to Moscow, where it continued on 22 April. At the St. Petersburg part of the exhibition painting "Overgrown Pond" was not presented, while the catalog mentioned three other paintings by Polenov – "Udilshchiki", "Grandmother's Garden" and "Summer". Canvas "Overgrown Pond" was exhibited at the Moscow part of the 7th traveling exhibition, together with Polenov's paintings "Grandmother's Garden", "River" and "Summer Morning" (it is not confirmed whether it was an alternative title for "Summer" or another canvas). An art critic from "Moskovskie Vedomosti" wrote that in the painting "Overgrown Pond" Polenov showed himself as a romanticist: "it is not a pond 'in general'", it has "its own story", "it is what the Germans call Stimmungsbild, such paintings are designed to give you, above all, a 'mood', and constitute in painting approximately the same thing that in poetry is "elegy".

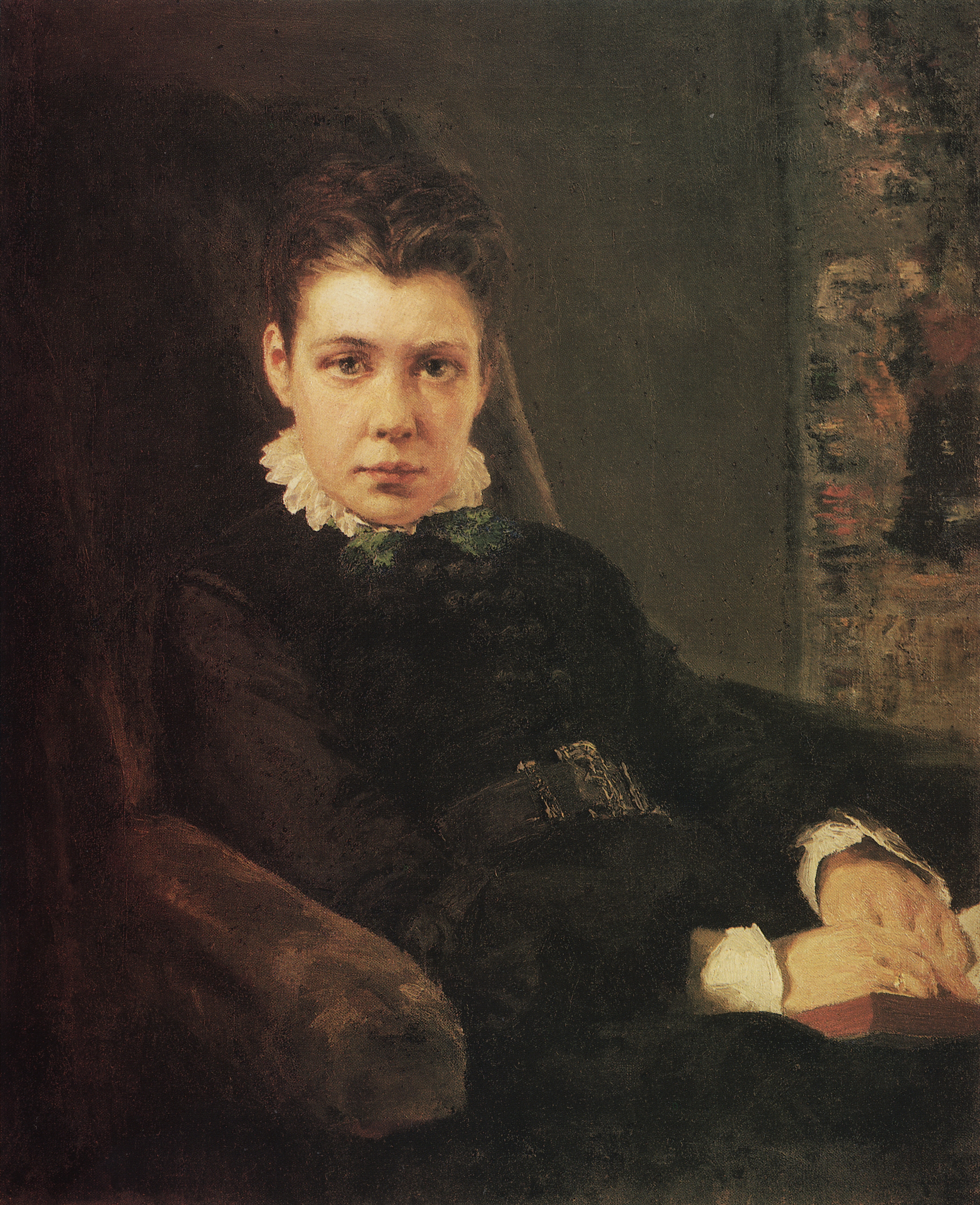
Portrait of V. D. Khrushchova, the artist's sister (1874, Polenovo)

The following year the painting "Overgrown Pond" was exhibited at the St. Petersburg part of the 8th traveling exhibition, which opened on 6 March 1880. The painting was also included in the exposition of the All-Russian Industrial and Art Exhibition of 1882, held in Moscow. In the future, the owners of the painting "Overgrown Pond" were E. A. Sapozhnikova and Y. I. Acharkan. The latter canvas was acquired in 1928 by the Tretyakov Gallery.

The painting was exhibited at several other exhibitions, including Polenov's exhibitions held in 1969 in Leningrad and in 1994–1995 in Moscow and St. Petersburg. In 1971–1972 the canvas took part in the exhibition "Landscape Painting of the Peredvizhniki" (Kyiv, Leningrad, Minsk, Moscow), timed to coincide with the centenary of the Peredvizhniki. With exhibitions the painting visited several foreign cities — Belgrade (1970), Bucharest (1973), Warsaw (1973), Berlin (1976), Washington, Chicago, Boston, Los Angeles (1986–1987), Cologne, Zürich (1990) and Wuppertal (2005–2006). The canvas was one of the exhibits of the anniversary exhibition for the 175th anniversary of Polenov, held from October 2019 to February 2020 at the New Tretyakov Gallery on Krymsky Val.

The painting "Overgrown Pond" is currently exhibited in Hall No. 35 of the main building of the State Tretyakov Gallery in Lavrushinsky Lane.

== Description ==
The view depicted in the painting "Overgrown Pond" summarizes different impressions of the artist. The painting depicts a part of the pond with bridges near the right edge. In the foreground, you can see the bank with green grass and wildflowers, in the background — the trees surrounding the pond park. The impression of the park's vastness is achieved by the canvas showing only the lower parts of trunks and branches leaning to the water, the artist "cuts off the tops of the trees with a frame, as if bringing the whole image closer to the viewer". In addition, in the gap on the left, the continuation of the park is outlined, considerably distant in perspective from the coastal trees. The biggest part of the painting, including the surface of the water and vegetation, is painted using various shades of green color. The mirror surface of the pond is studded with islets of the white waterlily.

A small piece of blue sky with clouds can be seen in the upper left corner of the painting. Its light reflection on the water surface is in the lower part, near the left edge of the canvas. The bridges and the paths approaching them are also depicted in light colors. Due to this, the viewer's eye is directed into the depths, where a young woman in a light-colored dress sits on a bench, whose figure is almost "dissolved" in the landscape. Her pensive appearance is in harmony with the surrounding nature, staying in a "state of inner immersion". Vera Dmitrievna Khrushchova (1844–1881, there is also the spelling "Khrushcheva"), a twin sister of the artist, served as the model for the figure of a seated woman.

Fragments of the painting "Overgrown Pond"
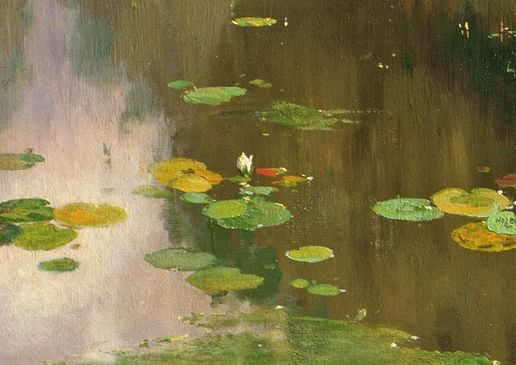
The surface of a pond with water lilies

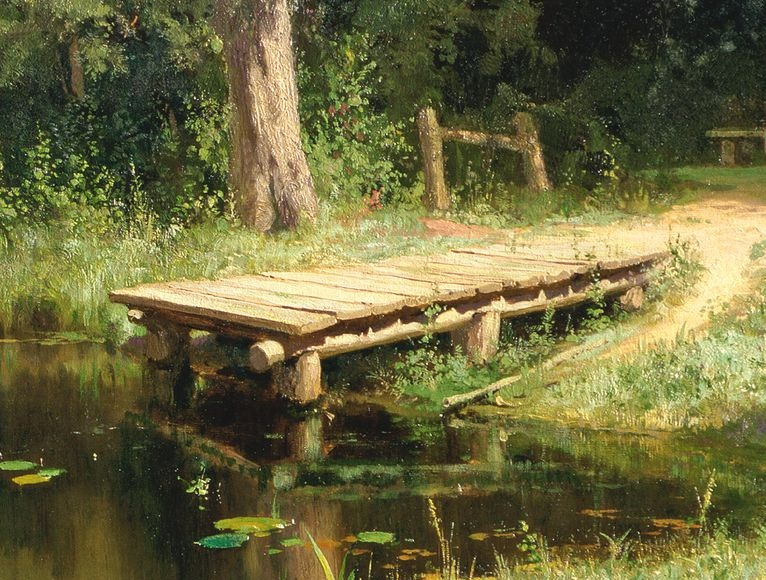
Bridges and a path

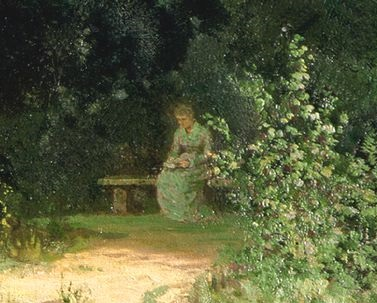
A woman sitting on a bench

== Etudes and repetitions ==
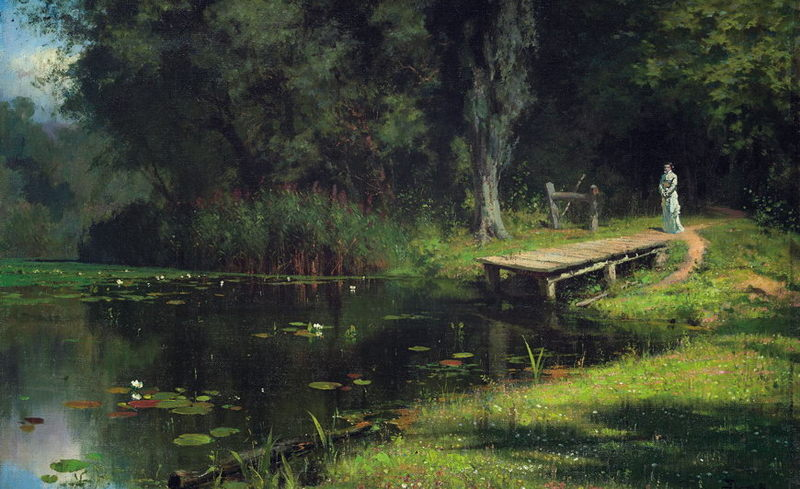
Overgrown pond (variant-repeat, 1880, Russian Museum)

Several sketches for the painting "Overgrown Pond" were painted by Polenov in 1877, when he was visiting his parents in the village of Petrushki near Kyiv.

Polenov also painted a smaller version of the canvas "Overgrown Pond" (1880, canvas, oil, 44 × 64.5 cm, State Russian Museum, inventory No. Ж-4212), which depicts the figure of a standing woman. The model for it, as well as for the large canvas, was Vera Khrushchova. This version, previously a part of the collection of V. I. Dvorishchin, arrived to the State Russian Museum in 1946 through the Leningrad State Purchase Commission.

Another version of the painting "Overgrown Pond" (canvas, oil, 30 × 58 cm, Inventory No. Ж-293) is kept in the Odesa Fine Arts Museum. According to one experts, it is an author's repetition, according to others — a study.

Another author's repetition of the painting "Overgrown Pond" is kept in a private collection. In addition, it is known about the existence of a variant called "Overgrown Pond" (1880) from the collection of the Moscow collector A. M. Koludarov, which was exhibited during the personal exhibition of Polenov in 1950 in Moscow.

== Reviews ==
Art historian Olga Lyaskovskaya wrote that when working on the painting "Overgrown Pond" Polenov "strove for a balanced composition, for the overall impression of pictorialism". According to her, the artist "peculiarly and truthfully" conveyed the texture of grass and leaves, as well as beautifully summarized "shrouded in fog distant clumps of trees and a corner of the blue sky with a cloud, reflected in the water".

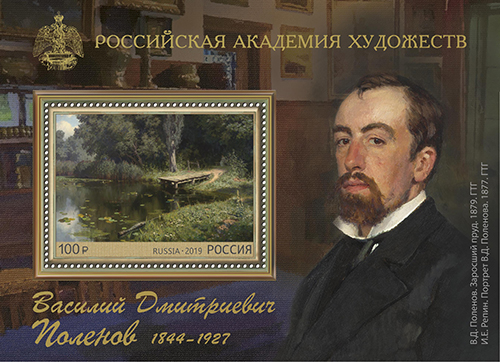
A miniature sheet dedicated to the 175th anniversary of Polenov, on which the painting "Overgrown Pond" is depicted.

In a monograph on Polenov's work, art historian Tamara Yurova wrote that the painting of "Overgrown Pond", almost entirely based on gradations of green color, "reveals Polenov's high skill as a colorist", and "the finely developed green scale in shades is characterized by exceptional beauty and richness of nuance". This creates the impression that "no two tones in the landscape are exactly the same", and there is also no "somewhat neutral paint, which solidly covered individual pieces of canvas in "Moscow Courtyard"." According to Yurova, the painting "Overgrown Pond" "completed a certain stage of Polenov's work, marked the onset of creative maturity".

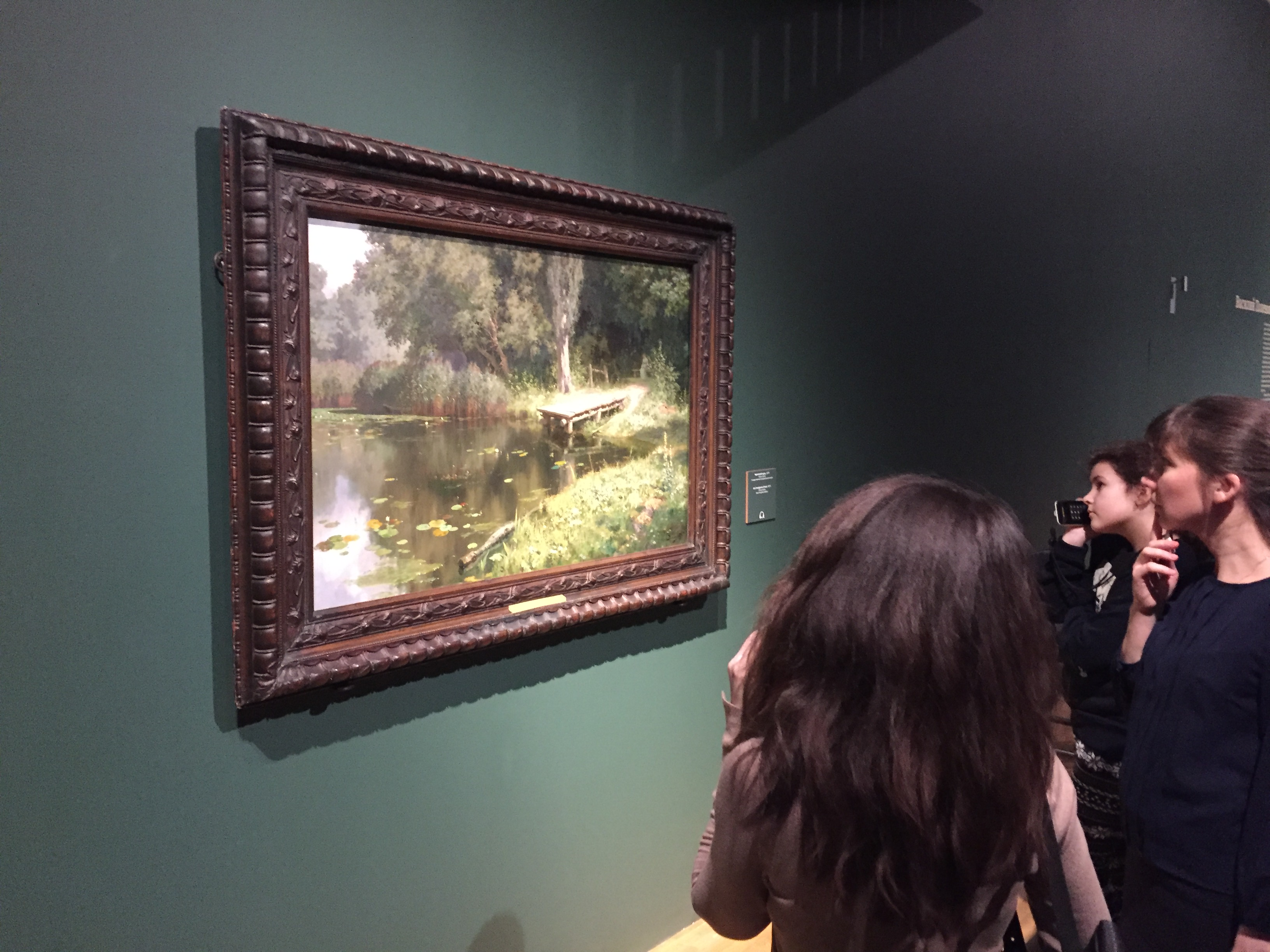
The painting "Overgrown Pond" at the 2019–2020 exhibition at the New State Tretyakov Gallery on Krymsky Val

According to art historian Aleksei Fedorov-Davydov, in the painting "Overgrown Pond" Polenov managed "with the greatest force and picturesque beauty" to express "the real, but laden with a kind of romanticism poetry of nature". According to him, "for all the intimacy of the motif," Polenovsky landscape turned out not at all chamber, but on the contrary, elevated and especially significant "in its synthetic generalization of the image". Fyodorov-Davydov noted that "both the well-known soundness of the colors, and the strict planning, and, finally, the moment of romanticism, which is perceptible in this landscape", allow us to speak of its "kinship" to the landscapes of Fyodor Vasilyev.

According to art historian Eleanora Paston, painted in the late 1870s Polenovsky paintings "Moscow Courtyard", "Grandmother's Garden" and "Overgrown Pond" constitute "a kind of lyrical and philosophical trilogy of the artist". In a monograph on the work of the artist, she noted that in the landscape "Overgrown Pond" "in the depiction of the old park, solemn in its monumental grandeur, prevails sublimely dreamy mood," which is "emphasized by the fragile motionless and pensive figure of a woman standing alone against the background of dark trees, spreading a mighty tent and as if serving as a safe haven for her." Paston wrote that "the theme of withdrawal from the hardships of reality into the world of nature," begun by Polenov in this painting, later developed in his works of the 1880s and 1890s, as well as in the work of one of Polenov's young friends Mikhail Nesterov.

== See also ==
- Vasily Polenov
- Peredvizhniki
- Tretyakov Gallery

== Bibliography ==
- Атрощенко, О.Д.; Бодунова, В. С.; Борисова, Е. А. (2019). Василий Поленов. Moscow: Государственная Третьяковская галерея. ISBN 9785895802625.
- Евстратова, Е. Н. (2013). 500 сокровищ русской живописи. Moscow: ОЛМА Медиа Групп. ISBN 9-785-373-04169-0.
- Копшицер, М. И. (2010). Поленов. Series The Lives of Remarkable People. Moscow: Молодая гвардия.
- Лясковская, О. А. (1965). "В. Д. Поленов". In Грабарь, И. Э. (ed.). История русского искусства. 2. Vol. 9. Moscow: Наука. pp. 119–148.
- Мальцева, Ф. С. (1999). Мастера русского пейзажа. Вторая половина XIX века. 2. Moscow: Искусство. ISBN 9785210013439.
- Пастон, Э. В. (1991). Василий Дмитриевич Поленов. Saint-Petersburg: Художник РСФСР. ISBN 5-7370-0227-6.
- Пастон, Э. В. (2000). Поленов. Moscow: Белый город. ISBN 5-7793-0225-1.
- Пастон, Э. В. (2003). Абрамцево. Искусство и жизнь. Moscow: Искусство. ISBN 5-85200-309-3.
- Пастон, Э. В. (2013). "Москва, как много в этом звуке…". Третьяковская галерея (3): 78–89.
- Пастон, Э. В. (2017). Василий Поленов. "Московский дворик". История одного шедевра. Moscow: Государственная Третьяковская галерея. ISBN 978-5-89580-169-7.
- Пастон, Э. В. (2019a). "Василий Поленов. От Золотого к Серебряному веку". Третьяковская галерея (3): 4–77.
- Пастон, Э. В. (2019b). Мир Василия Поленова. 1 (Россия). Moscow: Слово. ISBN 978-5-387-01592-2.
- Петинова, Е. Ф. (2001). Русские художники XVIII — начала XX века. Saint-Petersburg: Аврора. ISBN 978-5-7300-0714-7.
- Рогинская, Ф. С. (1989). Товарищество передвижных художественных выставок. Moscow: Искусство.
- Сахарова, Е. В. (1964). Василий Дмитриевич Поленов, Елена Дмитриевна Поленова. Хроника семьи художников. Moscow: Искусство.
- Теркель, Е. А. (2019). ""Больная" В. Д. Поленова — кто она?". Третьяковская галерея (3): 182–203.
- Фёдоров-Давыдов, А. А. (1986). Русский пейзаж XVIII — начала XX века. Moscow: Советский художник.
- Юрова, Т. В. (1961). Василий Дмитриевич Поленов. Moscow: Искусство.
- Брук, Я. В., ed. (2006). Государственная Третьяковская галерея — каталог собрания. 2: Н—Я. Vol. 4: Живопись второй половины XIX века. Moscow: Красная площадь. ISBN 5-900743-22-5.
- Государственный Русский музей — Живопись, XVIII — начало XX века (Catalogue). Аврора и Искусство. 1980.
- Леняшин, В. А., ed. (2017). Государственный Русский музей — каталог собрания. Vol. 7: Живопись второй половины XIX века (Н—Я). Saint-Petersburg: Palace Editions. ISBN 978-3-906917-17-7.
- Собко, Н. П., ed. (1882). Иллюстрированный каталог Художественного отдела Всероссийской выставки в Москве, 1882 г. Saint-Petersburg: Издатель М. П. Боткин.
- Калмановская, Л. Н.; Гурова, Л. Н., eds. (1997). Одесский художественный музей. Живопись XVI — начала XX веков (PDF). Catalogue. Odesa: ИМК «Город мастеров».
- Карпенко, О. М., ed. (1964). Одеська державна картинна галерея. Catalogue. Kyiv: Мистецтво.
- Андреева, В. В.; Астафьева, М. В.; Гольдштейн, С. Н.; Приймак, Н. Л., eds. (1987). Товарищество передвижных художественных выставок. Письма, документы. 1869—1899. Moscow: Искусство.
