= Moscow Courtyard =

Painting by Vasily Polenov

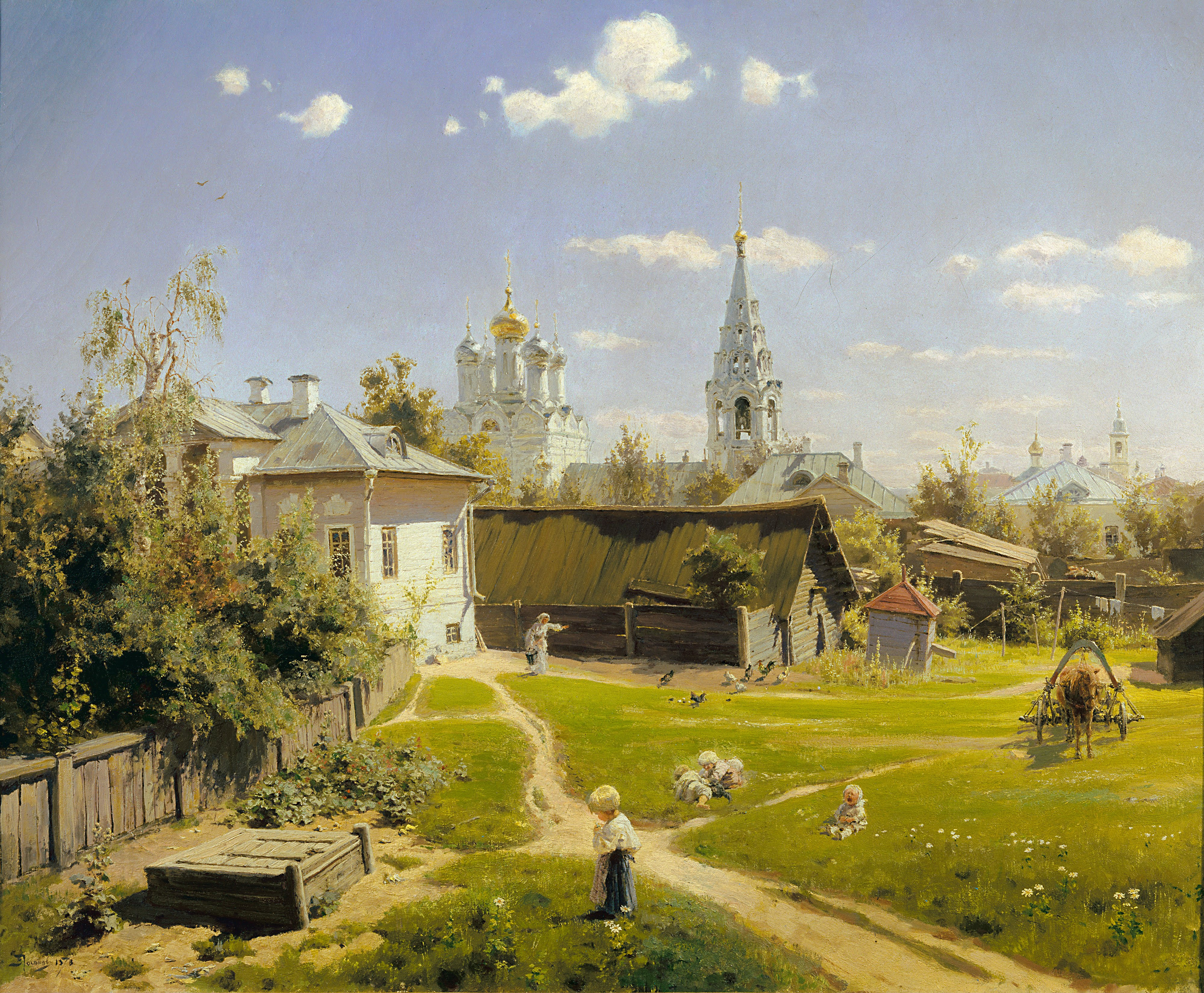
- Artist: Vasily Polenov
- Year: 1878
- Type: Oil on canvas
- Dimensions: 80,1 cm × 64,5 cm (315 in × 254 in)
- Location: Tretyakov Gallery, Moscow

Moscow Courtyard is a landscape painting by the Russian artist Vasily Polenov (1844–1927), completed in 1878. It belongs to the State Tretyakov Gallery (inventory 2670). Its dimensions are 64.5 × 80.1 cm. Together with two other works by Polenov from the late 1870s: the paintings Grandmother's Garden and Overgrown Pond, the canvas Moscow Courtyard has been attributed to "a kind of lyrical and philosophical trilogy of the artist".

The painting depicts the courtyard of a house at the intersection of Durnovsky and Trubnikovsky Streets, in the wing of which Polenov rented an apartment in 1877–1878. Behind the courtyard and the adjacent buildings is the Church of the Transfiguration on the Sand, and in the right part of the canvas are the outlines of the Church of St. Nicholas the Wonderworker in Plotniki. The work organically combines landscape and genre motifs.

The painting "Moscow Courtyard" was presented at the Moscow part of the 6th Exhibition of the Society for Traveling Art Exhibitions ("Peredvizhniki"), which was held in May 1878. It became Polenov's first work presented at the traveling exhibitions. Pavel Tretyakov bought that canvas directly from the exhibition.

According to art historian Alexei Fedorov-Davydov, the painting Moscow Courtyard is "full of simple and clear heartfelt poetry" and this work by Polenov "was a new word in Russian landscape painting and played a great role in it". Art historian Tamara Yurova noted that this canvas was among the "pearls of the Russian school of painting" and became "a milestone in the history of Russian landscape painting". Art historian Vitaly Manin called Moscow Courtyard a "masterpiece of landscape art" and wrote that "one such painting is enough to go down in history".

== History ==
=== Past events ===
In 1863–1871 Vasily Polenov studied at the Imperial Academy of Arts, where he was first (until 1866) a free student and then a regular student. His mentors in the history painting class were Alexei Markov, Pyoter Basin, Pyoter Shamshin, Alexander Beydeman and Carl Wenig. In 1871, Polenov was awarded a large gold medal by the Academy of Arts for his painting "The Resurrection of Jairus' Daughter" (now in the NIM RAH). Along with this award he received the title of the first class artist, as well as the right to a pensioner's trip abroad. In 1872–1873 Polenov visited Germany and Italy, and in 1873–1876 he lived and worked in Paris. In a letter to his parents, written shortly before the end of his trip abroad, the artist reported: "Here I tried all kinds of painting: historical, genre painting, landscape, marine art, head portrait, picture, animals, still life, and so on, and came to the conclusion that my talent is closest to the domestic landscape genre, which I will take up".

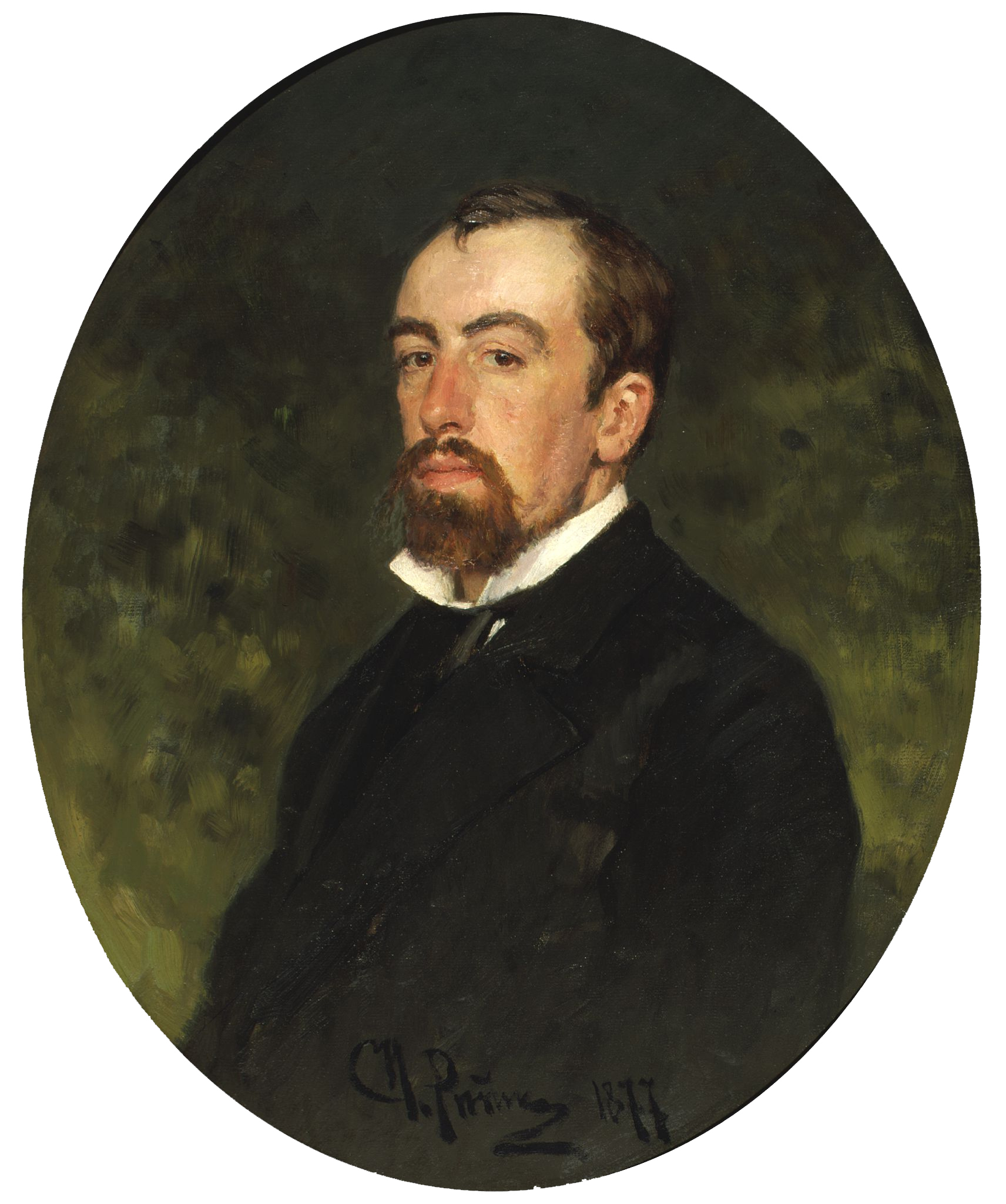
I. Е. Repin. Portrait of V. D. Polenov (1877, Tretyakov Gallery)

In the summer of 1876, Polenov returned to St. Petersburg. In the same year, "the Academy of Arts awarded him the title of Academician for his excellent knowledge of painting, as evidenced by the works presented. In the fall of 1876, having joined the Russian Volunteer Army, which took part in the First Serbian–Ottoman War, Polenov went to the area of military operations, where he created a number of drawings based on his battle impressions. At the end of the year, the artist returned to St. Petersburg, but with the desire to move to Moscow as soon as possible. In a letter to Elizaveta Mamontova (wife of entrepreneur and art patron Savva Mamontov) dated December 24, 1876, Polenov wrote "Strongly aspire to you in Moscow, probably, in it will be easier to work than in St. Petersburg, where not a minute can not have free to concentrate ...".

Polenov also discussed his move with the art critic Vladimir Stasov, who wrote to him in a letter dated 3 January 1877: "You are going to settle down in Moscow <...>, and in the meantime you do not need Moscow for anything, nor anything else in Russia. You have a mentality that is not Russian, not only not historically, but not even ethnographically not Russian. It would be better for you to live permanently in Paris or Germany. Unless, of course, some unexpected changes suddenly happen to you, opening some previously unknown boxes and pouring out unknown treasures and news. Of course, I am not a prophet!" Polenov, upset by Stasov's critical remarks, shared his doubts with the artist Ilya Repin. In a letter from Khuguev dated January 20, 1877, Repin wrote to Polenov: "No, dear brother, you will see for yourself how our Russian reality, which has never been depicted before, will shine before you. How you will be drawn in, to the marrow of your bones, to its poetic truth, as you begin to comprehend it, yes, with all the heat of love to translate it on your canvas, and you will be surprised at what will turn out before your eyes and the first to enjoy his work, and then all will not yawn in front of it".

=== Move to Moscow and work on the painting ===
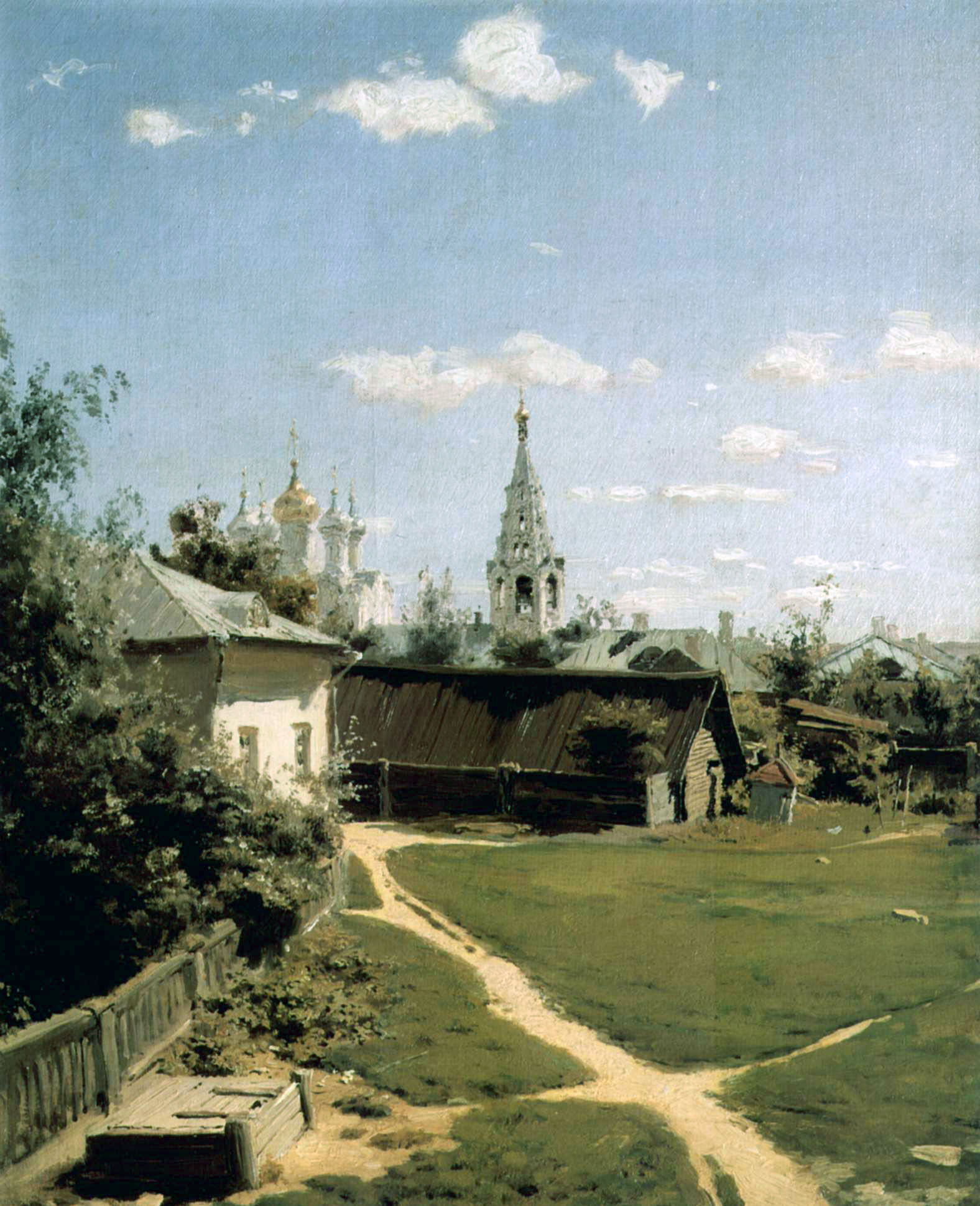
Moscow Courtyard (the first variant, 1877, The State Tretyakov Gallery)

In June 1877, the artist arrived in Moscow. He stayed with his father's friend, industrialist and publisher Fyodor Chizhov. In Moscow, Polenov planned to work on the historical painting "The Tonsure of the Incompetent Tsarevna". In addition, the artist planned to make a trip along the Volga and the eastern part of Russia, but soon after arriving in Moscow he left this idea.

It took him about three weeks to find an apartment. On 23 June 1877, Polenov wrote to Chizhov: "My new home is very close to yours, in Durnovsky Lane between Novinsky Boulevard and the Sobachiy Square. In the same letter, Polenov gave his new address: "Moscow, Durnovsky Lane near the Church of the Transfiguration on the Sand, the Baumgarten house". Polenov rented an apartment with his fellow artist Rafail Levitsky. Vasily Dmitrievich later recalled (according to his son's notes): "I was looking for an apartment. I saw a note on the door, went in to look, and right out of the window I saw this view. Vasily Dmitrievich later recalled (according to his son's notes): "I was looking for an apartment. I saw a note on the door, went in to look, and right out of the window I saw this view. I immediately sat down and painted it". The artist was referring to the original sketch variant "Moscow courtyard" (in Polenov's own list of his works it was recorded under the title "Arbat corner"). In the summer of the same year, already living in Durnovsky Lane, Polenov began to work on the main version of the canvas "Moscow courtyard", as well as on the painting Grandmother's Garden. At the same time the artist worked on studies of cathedrals and interiors of the Moscow Kremlin.

Apparently, a considerable part of the work on "The Moscow Courtyard" was done by Polenov in July and the first half of August 1877, because in the following months he had to travel a lot. At the beginning of July, 1877, the parents of Vasily Dmitrievich died: Dmitry Vasilievich and Maria Alekseevna invited him to their dacha, which was located in the village of Petrushky near Kyiv; apparently, the trip to the Kiev province took place in August. In September of the same year, Polenov stayed in Olshanka — the estate of his grandmother Vera Nikolaevna Voyeikova, located in Borisoglebsky uyezd, Tambov province. At the end of 1877 — beginning of 1878 Polenov was at the Bulgarian front of the Russo-Turkish War, where he performed the duties of an artist at the headquarters of the Imperial Russian Army.

=== 6th Travelling Art Exhibition and Painting Sale ===
On March 9, 1878, the 6th exhibition of the Society for Travelling Art Exhibitions (Peredvizhniki) was opened in St. Petersburg, which worked until April 22 and then moved to Moscow, where it continued its work on May 7. At the St. Petersburg part of the exhibition, Polenov's paintings were not presented. It is known that Polenov tried, at least belatedly, to send "Moscow Court" there – in a letter to the artist Ivan Kramsky, sent from Moscow and dated April 13, 1878, he wrote: "... my picture for the traveling exhibition is ready (the picture has been ready for a long time, but the frame only now). Unfortunately, I did not have time to do more important things, but I wanted to appear at the traveling art exhibition with something decent; I hope to earn lost time for art in the future. My picture shows a courtyard in Moscow in early summer. In the same letter, Polenov consulted with Kramsky about how to proceed: "Now I do not know whether to send it [the painting] to St. Petersburg or to wait until the exhibition arrives here" and asked to be informed "until what time the exhibition will continue in St. Petersburg". Polenov replied. In a reply dated April 14, 1878, Kramsky wrote to Polenov that he regretted "that your name does not appear here in St. Petersburg (since the exhibition closes on April 22 and is immediately sent to Moscow)". According to Kramskoi, "the matter does not change from that; nor will it change from the fact that: more or less important you will put".

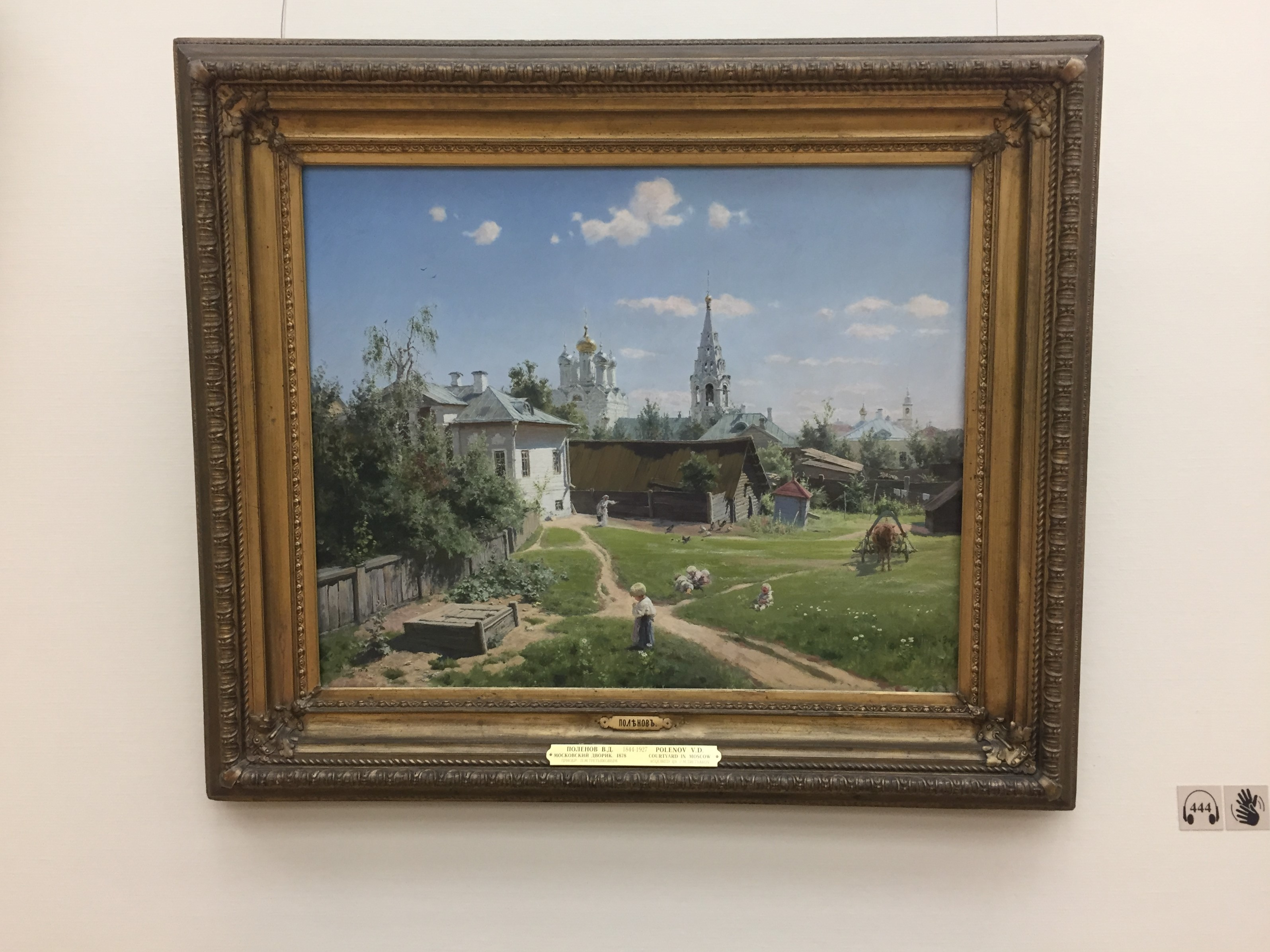
Moscow Courtyard in the State Tretyakov Gallery

So the canvas "Moscow Courtyard" was presented at the Moscow part of the 6th Traveling Art Exhibition, which took place from May 7 to July 1, 1878 in the building of the Moscow School of Painting, Sculpture and Architecture. The author of a review published in the newspaper "Moskovskiye Vedomosti" classified "Yard" as a "true genre painting", with the emphasis on the manor house: "An old wooden house, a mansion, <...> wrapped in the warm shade of the old, densely overgrown garden. <...> We know it, this family nest... Yes, this is it, an old peaceful house, living its life together with its garden and its "courtyard". This picture belongs to Mr. Polenov and is called "Cortyard in Moscow". In another review of the works of the traveling exhibition, it was written about the "charming, laughing, miniature landscape of Mr. Polenov" and noted that "the eye does not want to take away from this joyful, patriarchal picture...". The artist Vasily Baksheev recalled: "When "Moscow Courtyard" was first exhibited, all the sketches and landscapes by other artists next to it seemed as black as oilcloth, so much light, air, cheerfulness and truth was in this small in size, but deep in content painting".

Directly from the exhibition, the painting was purchased from the author by Pavel Tretyakov, who, in a letter to Ivan Kramsky dated 11 May 1878, characterized this canvas as follows: "Polenov has painted a very beautiful thing, neither a landscape nor a genre painting, but a kind of both: a Moscow or provincial aristocratic courtyard overgrown with grass. It is typical and beautifully written". In a letter to the artist Pavel Chistyakov dated May 19, 1878, Polenov reported, "My picture has really been sold, it was bought by Pavel Mikhailovich Tretyakov".

The painting "Moscow Courtyard" was the first of Polenov's works to be exhibited at the Peredvizhniki. In a letter to Pavel Chistyakov dated May 19, 1878, Polenov wrote about his long-standing desire to become a member of the Societe of Travelling Art Exhibitions: "...here are six years as I want to enter, but various external circumstances prevented. Now, as far as I understand, these circumstances no longer exist, and I am free, and all my sympathies have been on the side of this society from the beginning, so if I am accepted as a member, I will be very pleased about it". On May 27, 1878, at the general meeting of the members of the Partnership, held in Moscow, Polenov was unanimously elected a full member. My election as a member of the Society was a great event for me", the artist himself wrote. From then on, he regularly presented his works at traveling exhibitions, until the last one in 1923.

=== Next events ===
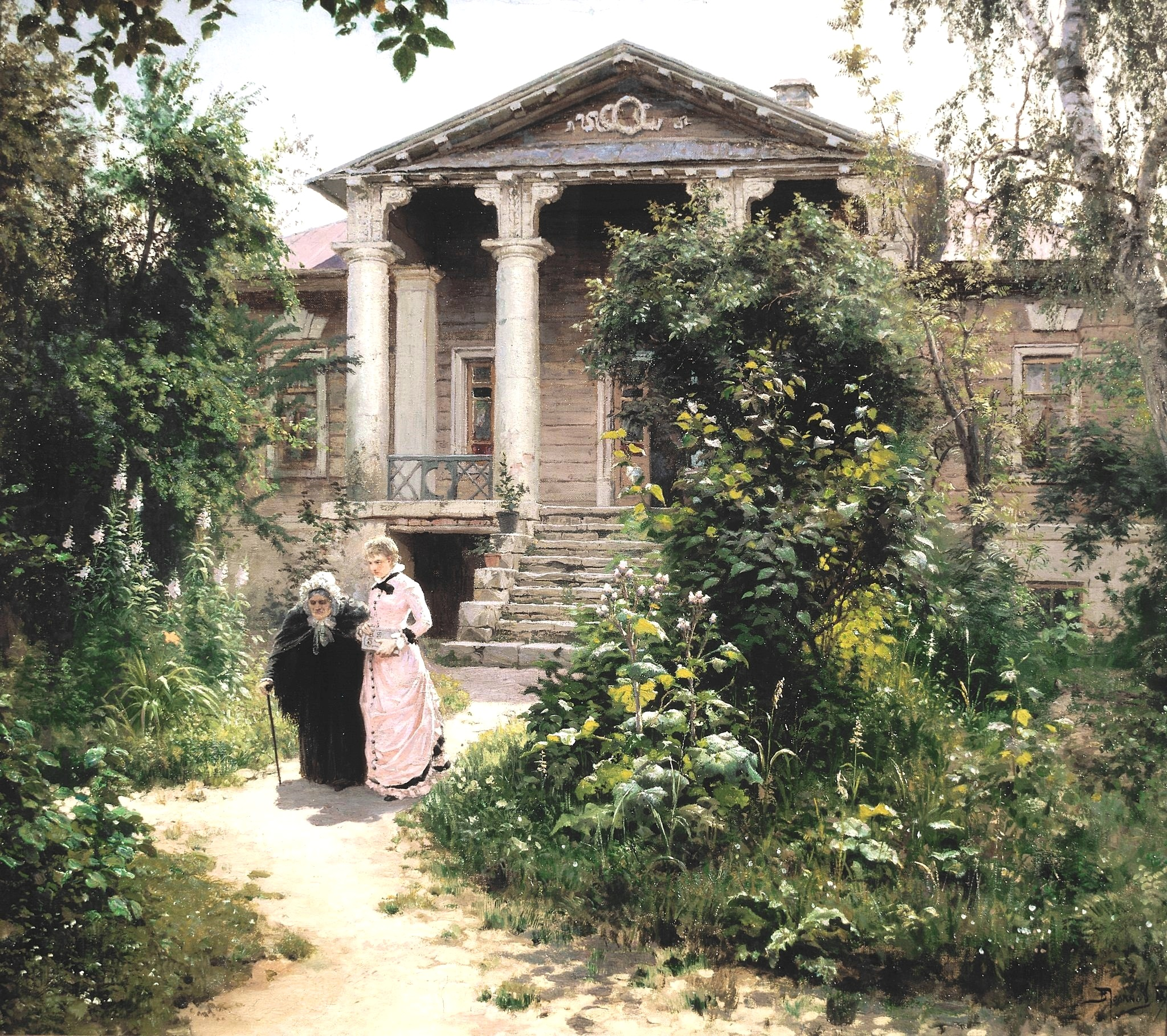
Grandmother's Garden (1878, the State Tretyakov Gallery)

In 1878, Polenov completed the painting Grandmother's Garden, which depicted the same mansion as in "Moscow Courtyard". Together with two other works by the artist ("Udilshchiki" and "Summer"), the painting Grandmother's Garden was presented at the 7th Travelling Art Exhibition, which opened on February 23, 1879 in St. Petersburg.

In May 1879, after a visit to the Tretyakov Gallery, Polenov had the desire to make some changes in "Moscow Courtyard": in particular, to improve the image of the light and air environment. In a letter to Pavel Tretyakov, dated May 29, 1879, the artist wrote: "Yesterday I was in your gallery and I saw my courtyard there. The air in it was extremely unpleasant, on the sketch it is much better, so I humbly ask you to allow me to improve it". Apparently, permission was granted, as technical and technological studies of the painting conducted in 1994–1995 showed that the artist had indeed done the appropriate work on the landscape[60]. According to some reports, on January 29, 1880, Polenov asked Tretyakov about the possibility of presenting "Moscow Courtyard" at the St. Petersburg part of the 8th Travelling Art Exhibition, since the canvas had never been exhibited in St. Petersburg before. In the official catalogue of the exhibition, which opened on March 6, 1880, "Moscow Courtyard" was not included, but there were other works by Polenov: "Overgrown Pond", "Valley of Death" and "Turkish Outpost".

Later the "Moscow Courtyard" was exhibited at a number of exhibitions, including the exposition in the Tretyakov Gallery dedicated to the 25th anniversary of Tretyakov's death (1923), as well as at Polenov's personal exhibitions held in Moscow in 1924, in Leningrad in 1969, and in Moscow and St. Petersburg in 1994–1995. In 1971–1972 the canvas took part in the exhibition "Landscape Painting of the Peredvizhniki" (Kyiv, Leningrad, Minsk, Moscow), which was held on the occasion of the 100th anniversary of the Society for Traveling Art Exhibitions. The canvas was one of the exhibits in the commemorative exhibition for the 175th anniversary of Polenov's birth, which was held at the New Tretyakovka in Krymsky Val from October 2019 to February 2020.

Currently, the painting "Moscow Courtyard" is exhibited in hall No. 35 of the main building of the Tretyakov Gallery in Lavrushinsky Lane. In the same hall are exhibited two other paintings from Polenov's lyrical-philosophical trilogy of the late 1870s — Grandmother's Garden and Overgrown Pond, as well as other works by the artist.

== Description ==
The painting depicts a typical Moscow courtyard of the second half of the 19th century on a clear summer day. Children are playing on a green lawn between houses, barns and wooden fences. Two boys lying on the grass are playing with a cat, and a small child is crying away from them. Near the foreground, a blonde girl (possibly the older sister of the crying child) stands looking at a plucked flower. In the distance, near the barn, a woman walks with a bucket, chickens wander near the well, and at the right edge of the canvas, a horse harnessed to a cart waits patiently for its master. By the fence, laundry is drying on a rope. The diagonals of the paths crossing the courtyard indicate the depth of the space. Three figures: a girl with a flower, a woman with a bucket and a standing horse — the triangle of the composition. They emphasize the relationship of scales.

Fragments of the painting "Moscow Courtyard"

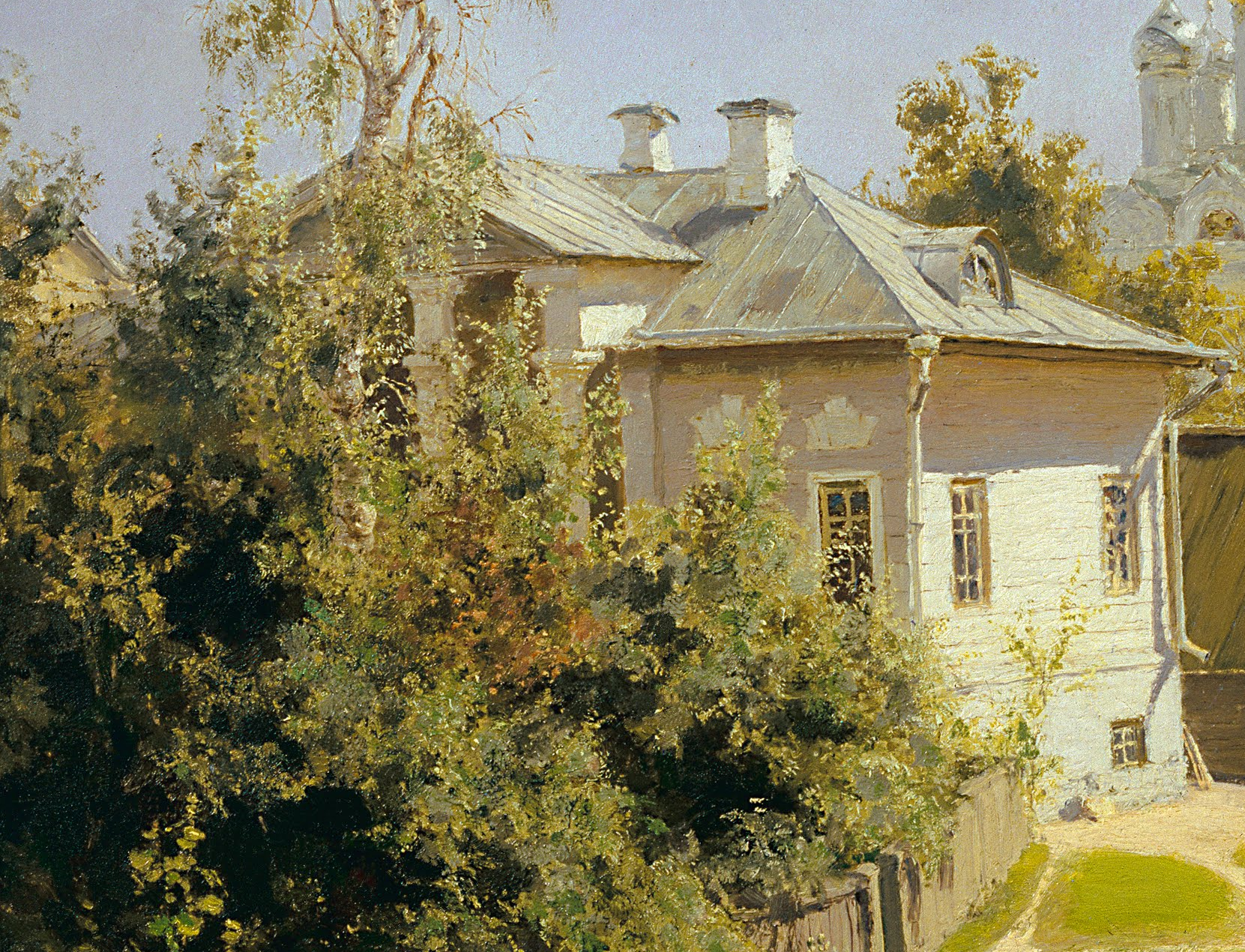
Mansion house

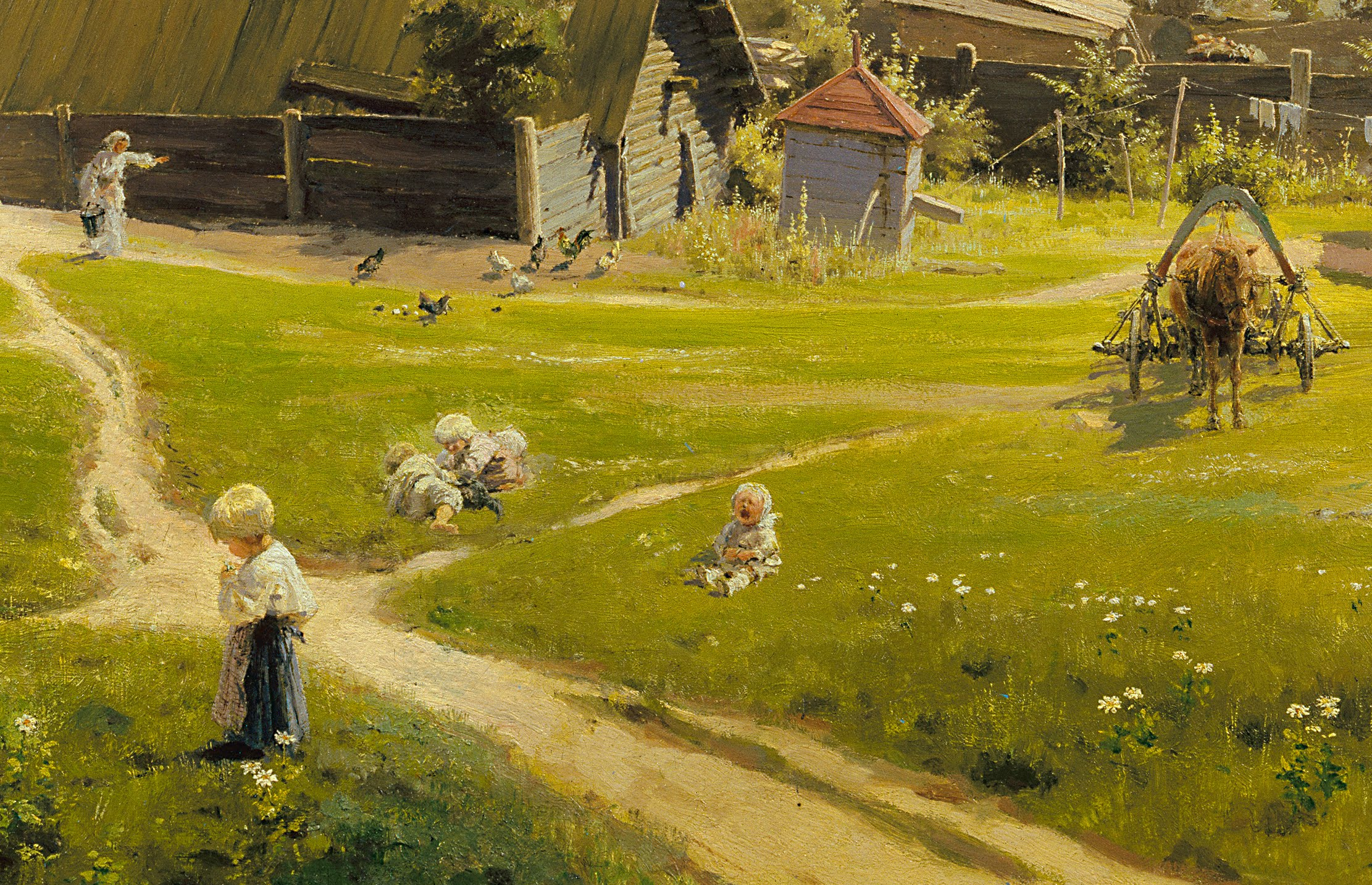
Children, a woman with a bucket and a horse

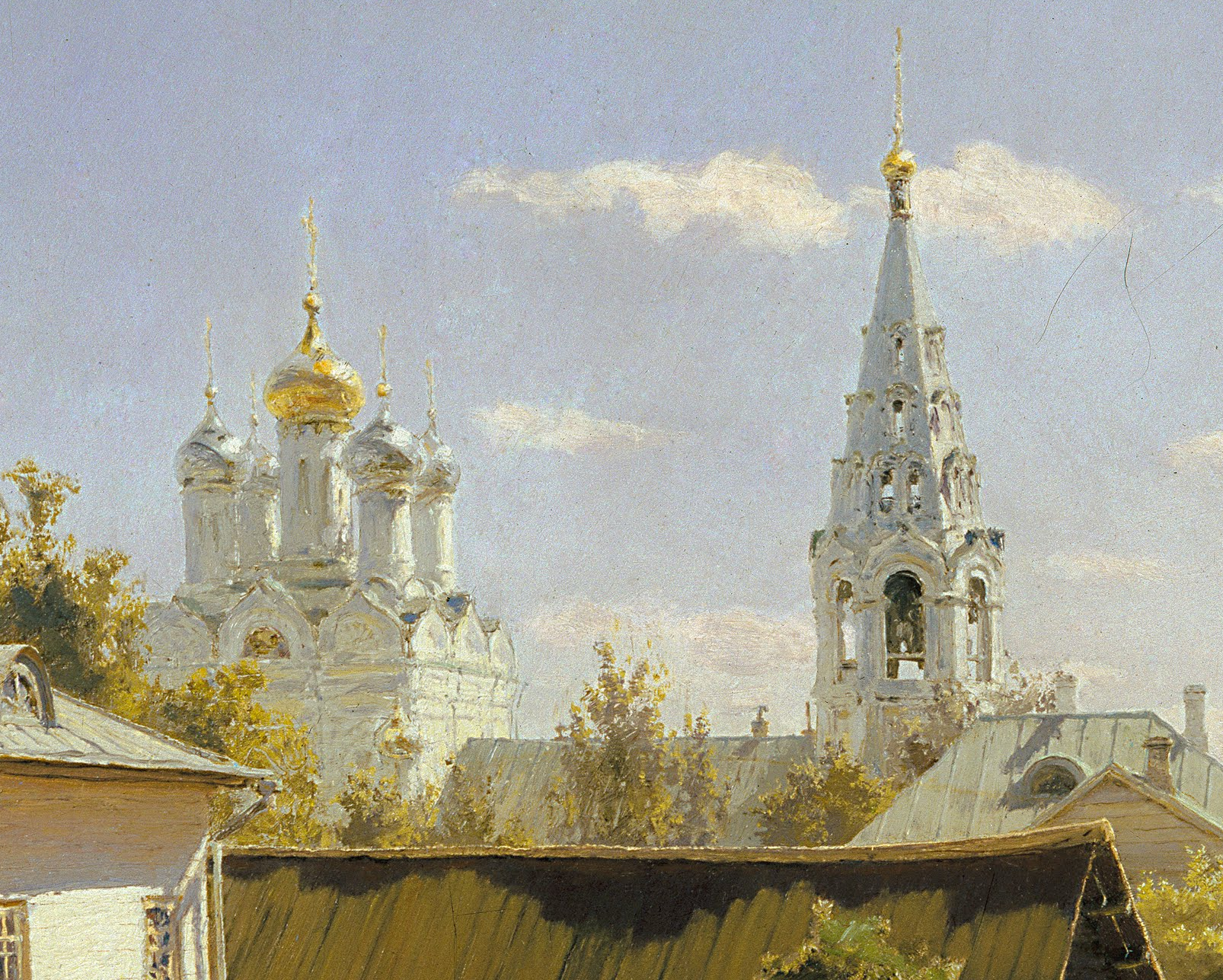
Church of the Transfiguration on the Sand

In the left part of the canvas there is a fenced garden and an old manor house, the end of which faces the lawn. The same manor house, but from the side of the garden, was depicted by Polenov in the painting Grandmother's Garden, also dated 1878. The place from which Polenov could have seen such a view was determined by the "Atlas of the Capital of Moscow" by the topographer Alexei Khotev in 1852–1853 and the alphabetical index to this atlas. The estate located at the intersection of Durnovsky and Trubnikovsky pereuloks is marked on the map at number 148. In particular, it included a manor house adjoining Trubnikovsky Lane and an outbuilding facing Durnovsky Street. According to the alphabetical index, in the 1850s this estate belonged to Lieutenant Colonel Alexander Nikolayevich Yuriev. After Yuriev's death the estate passed to his widow and then (according to the data for 1882) was registered in the name of the cornet Nikolai Lvovich Baumgarten — the husband of Yuriev's daughter. Prince Georgy Lvov, who lived in the same house as the author of "The Moscow Court", later recalled: "Our house Yurieva, then Baumgarten, immortalized by Polenov, who also lived there, in his painting Grandmother's Garden. The old woman is Yurieva, and her married daughter Baumgarten is carrying her under her arm". (Note: In 1936, a four-story school building was erected on the site of the mansion depicted in the painting. Later, it received the status of a special school with advanced study of the French language and was later renamed as the 12th special school. In 2013, after merging with other buildings, the school received the status of a gymnasium and a new name: V. D. Polenov Gymnasium No. 1231.)

Arbat part (sheet 2) from "Atlas of the Capital City of Moscow" by A. Khotev (1852-1853)

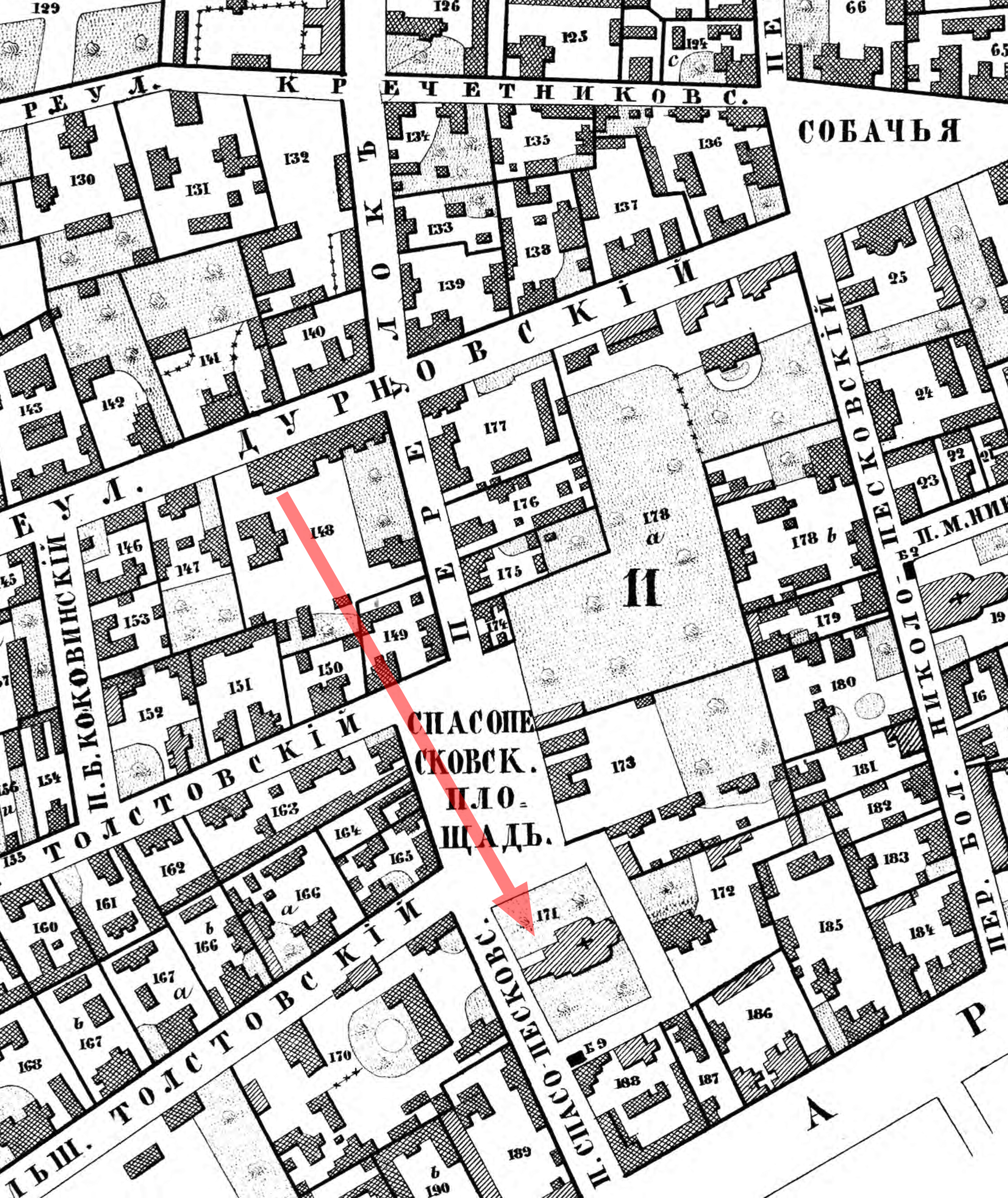
Fragment of A. Khotev's plan. A. Khotev's plan (the arrow corresponds to the direction of view)

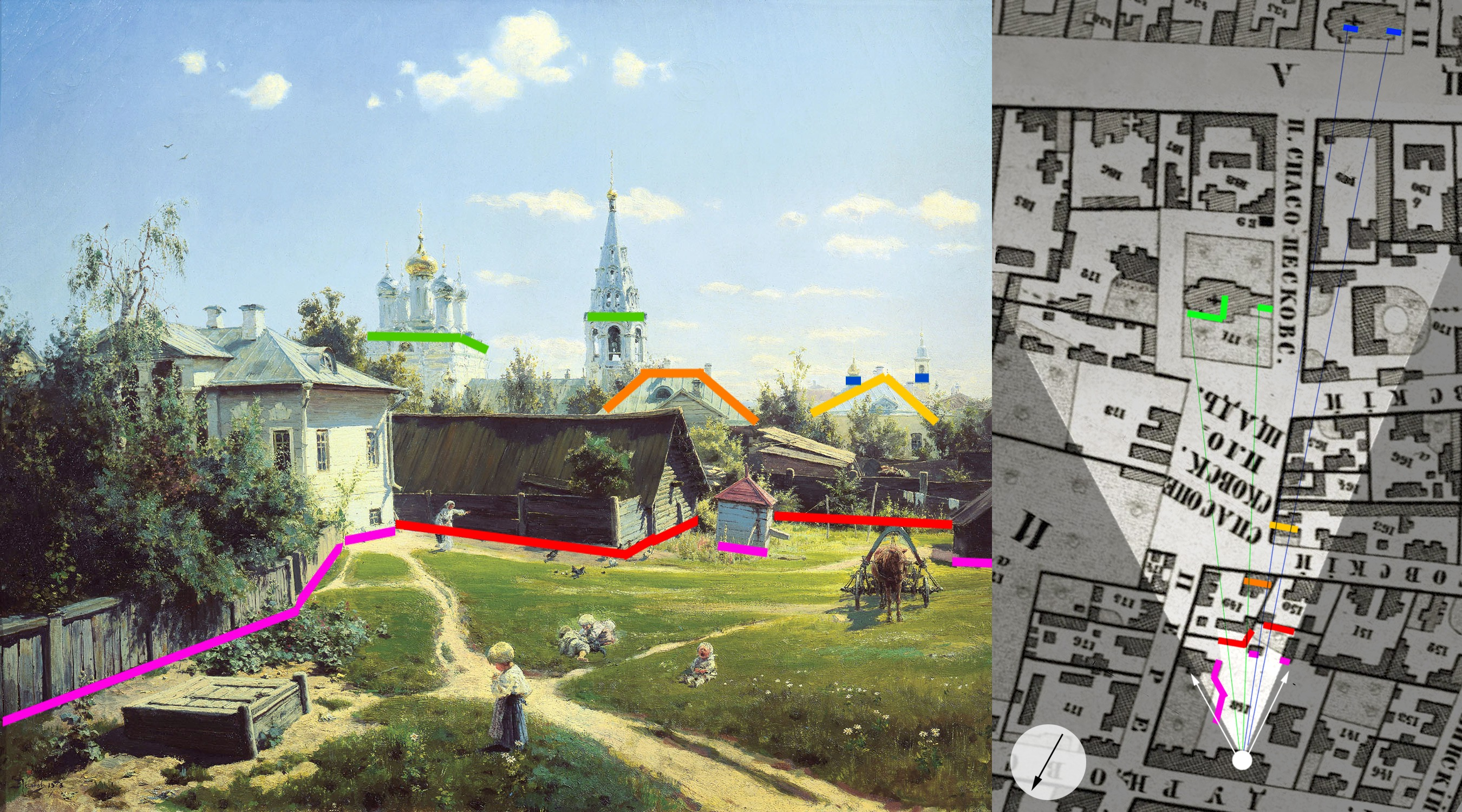
Comparison of the view of the Moscow courtyard from Polenov's painting and A. Khotev's plan. Khotev's map of 1852-1853 (map orientation is determined by the arrow in the lower left corner)

The name "Durnovsky pereulok" existed until 1952. After Sobachiya Square and Sobachiya Lane were added to it, everything together became known as Composer's Street. In the 1960s, during the construction of Kalinin Avenue (now New Arbat Avenue), only the part of Composer Street from the Garden Ring to Bolshoi Nikolopeskovsky Lane remained. In the place of Polenov's "courtyard" there is now the courtyard of the house No. 17 on Composer Street.

Behind the yard and neighboring buildings there is a white five-domed church with a tent-like bell tower (with a cone-shaped top) — the Church of the Transfiguration of the Savior on the Sands, built around 1711 and preserved until our time. In the right part of the picture you can see the outlines of another temple with a bell tower — the Church of St. Nicholas the Wonderworker in Plotniki. This church, built in 1691, was located on the Arbat Street, at the crossroads with Nikolsky (since 1922 – Plotnikov) Lane. It was pulled down in 1932. The domes of another church, located in the Prechistenskaya part of Moscow, are barely visible to the right of it.

In November 1916, answering the question of Moscow-city's researcher Ivan Zhuchkov about the circumstances of the creation of the canvas "Moscow Courtyard", Vasily Polenov wrote that he "then lived in Maly Tolstovsky Lane, at the corner of Trubnikovsky, near the Smolensky market", near the Church of the Redeemer on Peski, which then "was white, and now has become dark gray". According to Polenov, "at present there is neither a yard nor a tavern house". The current name of Maly Tolstovsky Lane is Kamennaya Sloboda, and it is located between Compositor Street (formerly Durnovsky Lane) and the Church of the Transfiguration on the Sand. The art historian Eleanor Paston, who has studied this question in detail, believes that in 1916 (almost forty years after the painting) Polenov could have mistakenly given the name of the neighboring lane.

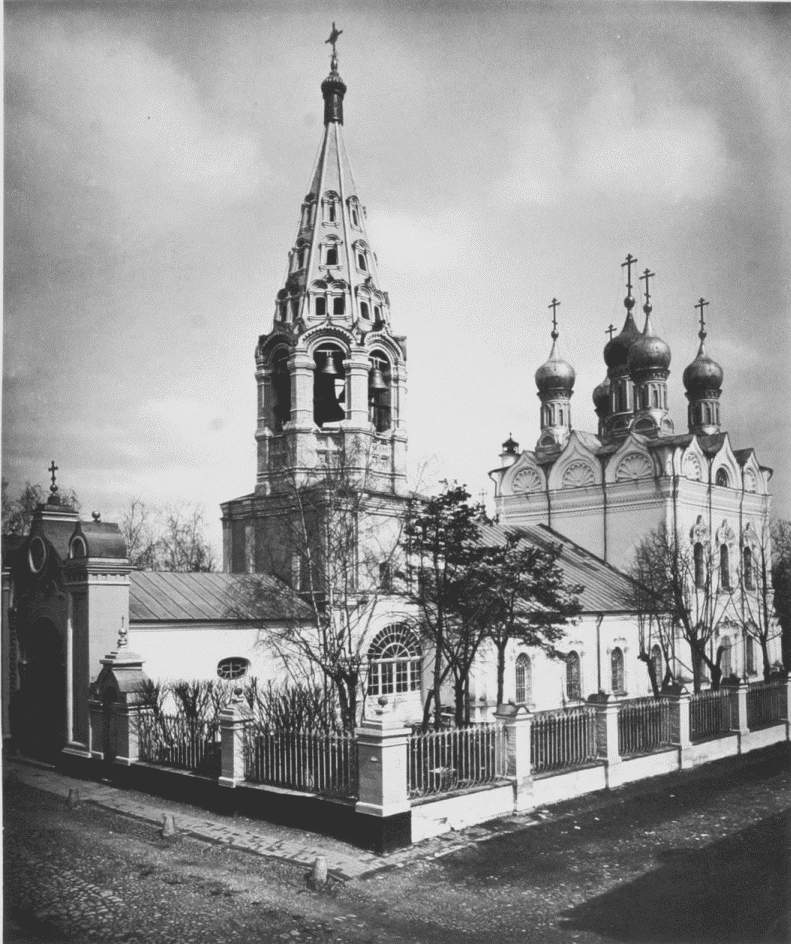
Church of the Transfiguration on the Sand in Moscow (photo of 1882)

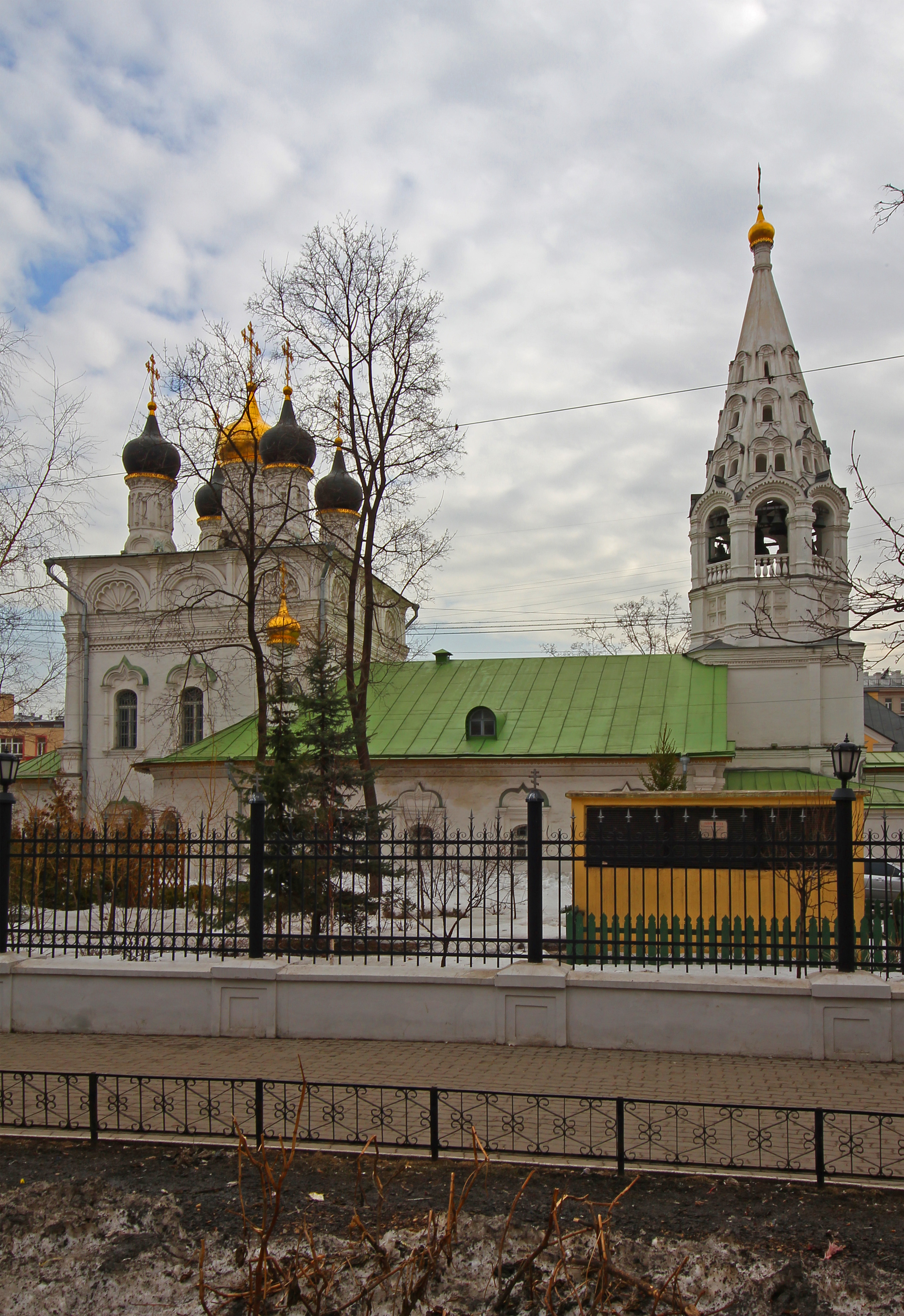
Church of the Transfiguration on the Sand in Moscow (photo of 2011)

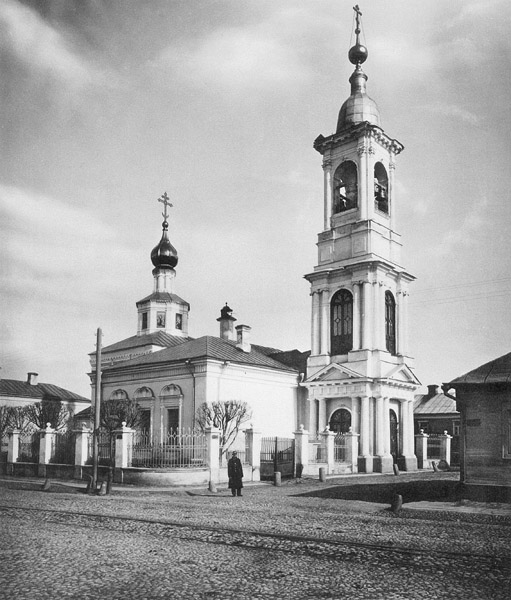
Church of St. Nicholas the Wonderworker in Plotniki (photo of 1882)

In comparison with the original version on the painting made in 1878, Polenov changed its format: instead of vertical, he made it horizontal. This allowed the artist to strengthen the role of architectural structures and, in particular, to add the image of the Church of St. Nicholas the Wonderworker in Plotniki. In addition, the Church of the Transfiguration of the Savior on the Sands was moved closer to the center of the canvas because the house partially hides it. The manor house also became more visible — its portico with columns was opened. The result was "a peculiar rhythm of houses and churches, supported by precisely and subtly found color relationships, the absence of strong light contrasts". However, the main difference between the painting and the original version was the use of genre painting's motif, which gave the canvas a narrative without violating the integrity of the presented image: "an ordinary moscow courtyard was filled with meaning and began to be perceived as part of the seen a great life that has a beginning and a continuation".

The clear structure of the compositional solution of the "Moscow Courtyard" is achieved by its relative closure and "a kind of "interiority", the subordination of all parts of the picture to the whole". Despite the apparent integrity of the picture, it is possible to distinguish separate zones with different semantic accents. The first zone represents the events of "farm life": the viewer can easily enter the "stretched" foreground, from which the eye moves along the beaten path to the woman with the bucket, from her to the right to the flock of chickens, the red-roofed well and the standing horse. Then the eye is directed to another zone, deep in the yard and beyond, through the barn to the other houses, the church with its bell tower, and the blue sky with the occasional cloud.

The picture "Moscow Courtyard" was the first work in which Polenov's "aesthetic credo", which he formulated most clearly in 1888 in a letter to the painter Viktor Vasnetsov, sounded with particular force: "Art must give happiness and joy, otherwise it is worthless. There is so much sorrow in life, so much vulgarity and filth, that if art completely bombards you with horror and villainy, it will be too hard to live".

== Original version (study) and authors' replicates ==
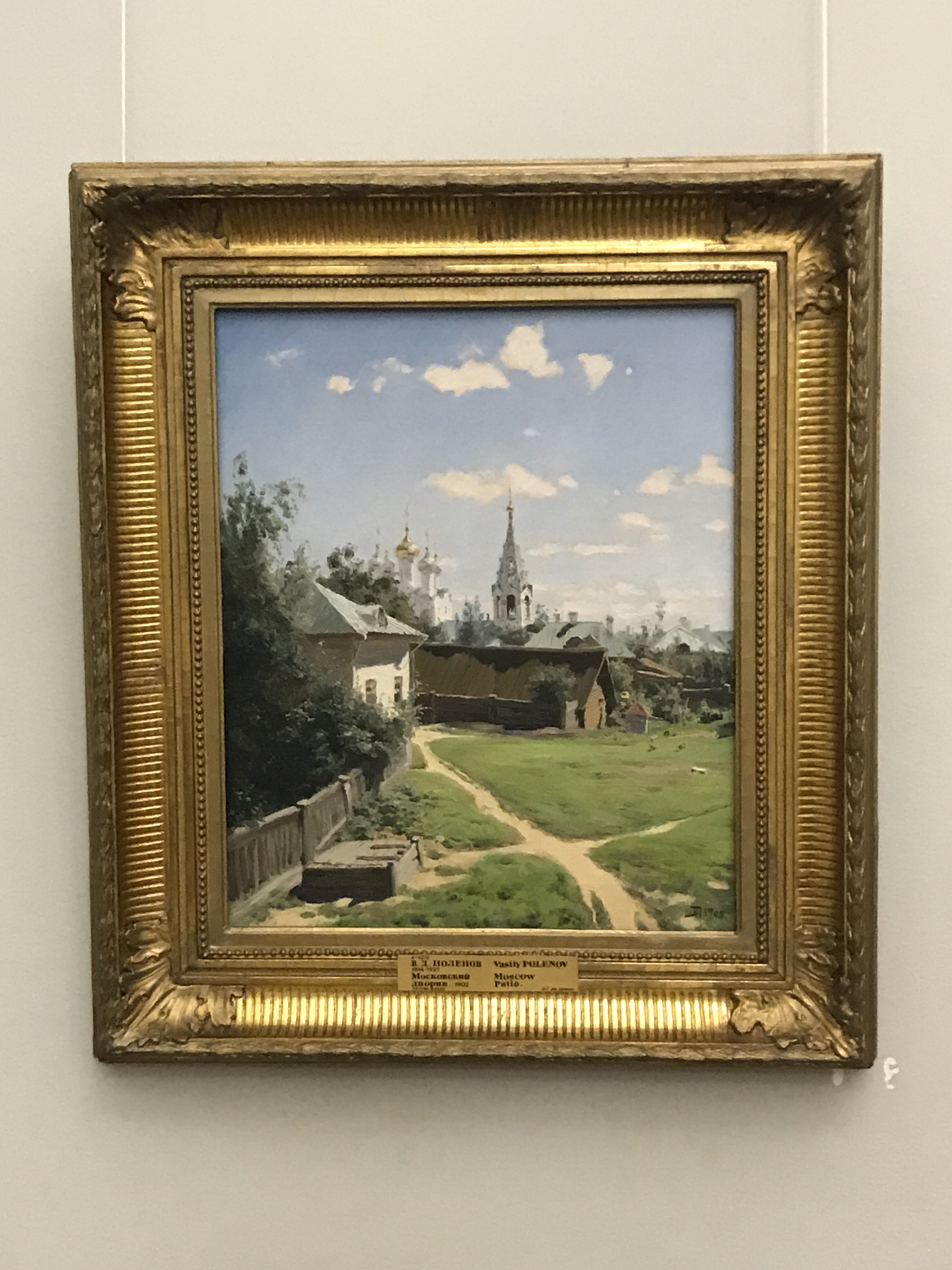
Author's repetition of the original version of the painting "Moscow Courtyard" in the State Russian Museum

The Tretyakov Gallery also owns the original version of the painting "Moscow Courtyard" (canvas on cardboard, oil, 49.8 × 39 cm, 1877, inv. no. 11151), formerly owned by N.V. Polenova and then in the collection of the artist and collector Ilya Ostroukhov. The painting came to the Tretyakov Gallery from the Ostroukhov Museum in 1929. Polenov called this version as a "study": in the list of works compiled by the artist himself, it was included at number 123 under the title "Arbatsky Corner". In the catalogs of the Tretyakov Gallery, published in 1952 and 1984, it was called "sketch-variant".

In the same list of Polenov's works, under number 124 (under the same title "Arbatsky Corner"), there was mentioned the author's repetition, created in 1880 and presented by the artist to the writer Ivan Turgenev, with whom he was acquainted since 1874. In one of his letters, Polenov wrote about this repetition: "When Turgenev came to the opening of the monument to Pushkin, I was also there. I made a repetition of my sketch with the Savior on Peski. I rented an apartment with a view of this church. There's also the dog's playground, where "Smoke" begins. This is Turgenev's corner. I gave him this sketch. The artist referred to the monument to Alexander Pushkin in Moscow, inaugurated on June 6, 1880. Later, Turgenev kept this author's repetition in his study in Bougival: according to the author of his biography, Yuri Lebedev, "upon entry into the study, the painting of V. D. Polenov's 'Moscow Courtyard'. This was also testified by Alexandra Olsufyeva, who visited Turgenev at Bougivalin November 1882 and gave him the text of Leo Tolstoy's "Confessions". This version of the painting "Moscow Courtyard" (French: La petite cour de Moscou) is kept in the collection of Turgenev's museum, opened in his dacha in Bougival.

The State Russian Museum keeps another author's replica of the original version of the painting "Moscow Courtyard" created by Polenov in 1902 (canvas, oil, 55.2 × 44 cm, inv. no. Ж-4210). The artist gave it to his friend, the doctor and collector Ivan Troyanovsky, who had a large collection of paintings by Russian artists. In Troyanovsky's home gallery "Moscow Court" was hung "in the most honorable place". Shortly before his death, which occurred in 1928, Troyanovsky transferred to the Russian Museum two works by Polenov from his collection — "Sick" and "Moscow Court".

Another author's replica of the original version of the "Moscow Courtyard", created in 1908, is in a private collection. It was exhibited at Polenov's personal exhibition in Moscow in 1950. According to some reports, this work was commissioned by a certain "Mr. Klamroth[a]". Besides, the existence of two watercolor replicas in private collections is known.

== Reviews ==
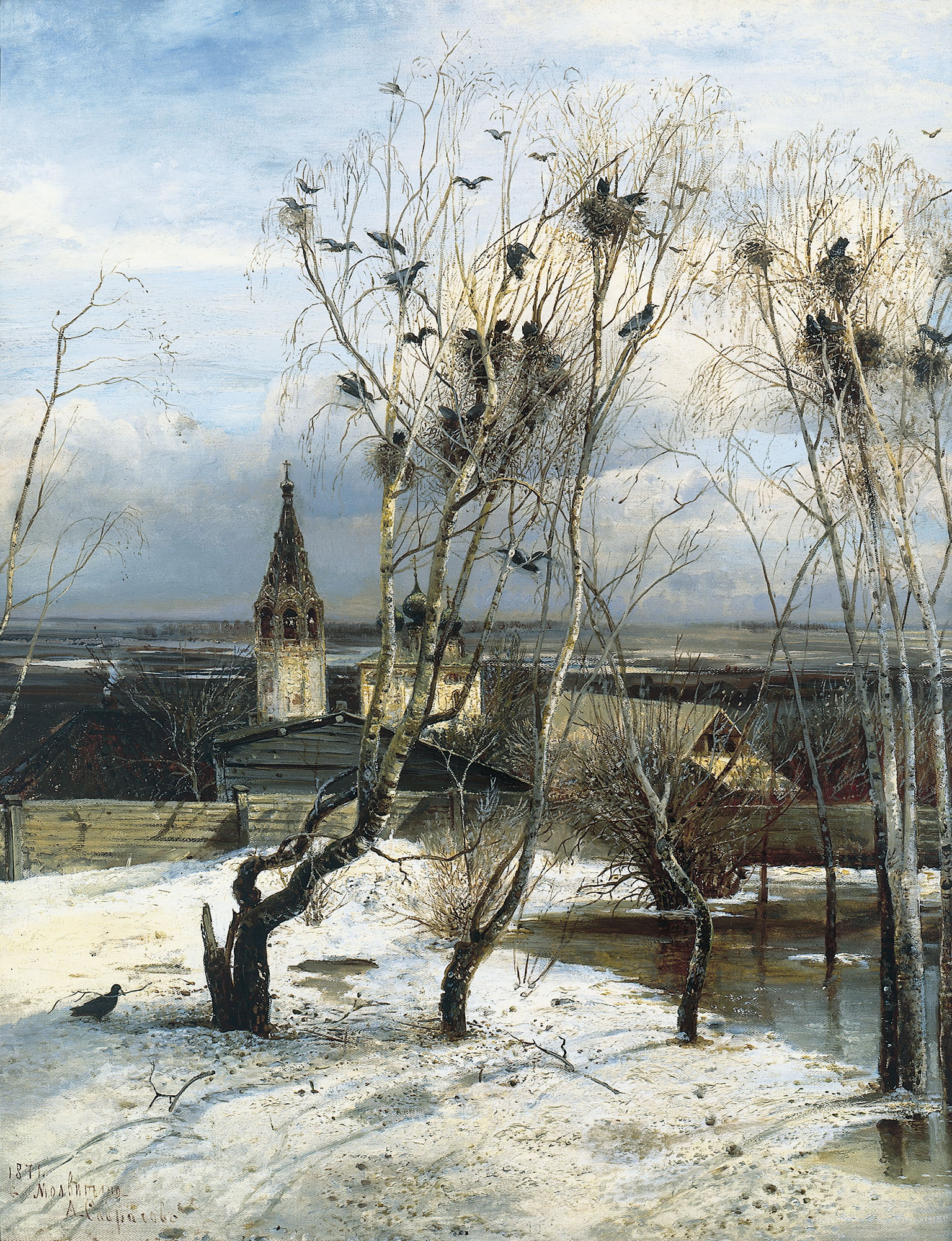
Alexei Savrasov, The Rooks Have Returned (1871, Tretyakov Gallery)

Art historian Olga Lyaskovskaya wrote that the painting "Moscow Courtyard" can be considered the pinnacle of Polenov's work, combining landscape and genre themes. She noted that this painting "became Polenov's most popular work and forced him to be recognized as a truly Russian artist". According to Lyaskovskaya, this painting "full of silence and comfort" "does not just depict a certain corner of old Moscow, but gives an unforgettable typical image, which contains the characteristic features of the era and its everyday life".

In a monograph on Polenov's work, art historian Tamara Yurova noted that the canvas "Moscow Courtyard" was among the "pearls of the Russian school of painting", became "a milestone in the history of Russian landscape painting" and also served as the most complete and perfect expression of "the theme of man's harmonious existence in nature". According to Yurova, the poeticism of the image in "Moscow Courtyard" is achieved by the fact that "it is associated with the quiet and natural existence of man – a part of nature, imbued with joyful acceptance of existence, faith in the immutability of the beauty of life". According to Yurova, Polenov put into the canvas "the full force of his love for life, for people, which makes even the most ordinary and prosaic things poetic".

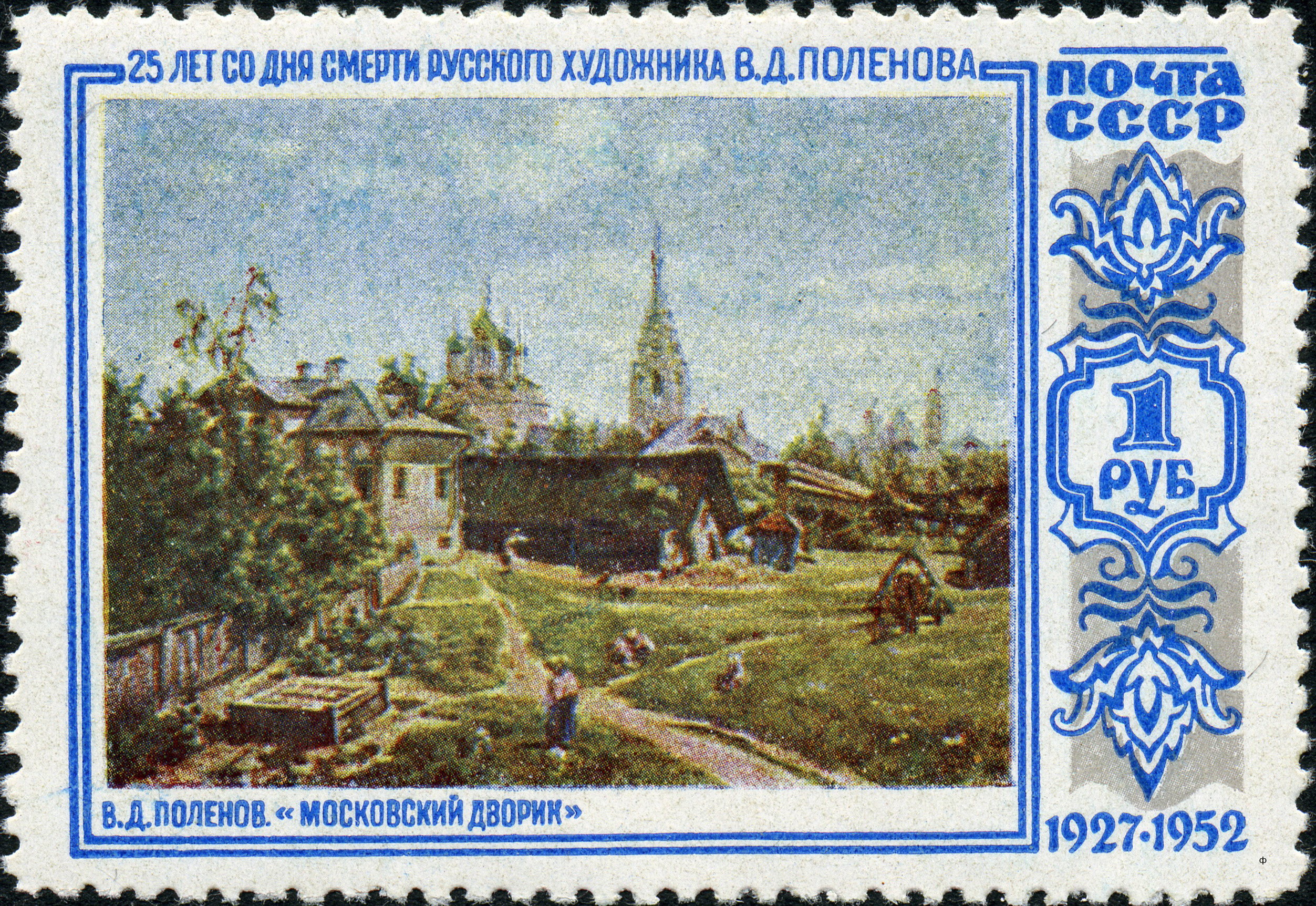
The painting "Moscow Courtyard" on a 1952 USSR postage stamp

Art historian Alexei Fedorov-Davydov wrote that the painting "Moscow Courtyard" is filled with "simple and clear soulful poetry". According to him, in this work Polenov managed to "perceive the simplest and most banal motif in a poetic way", to show the viewer the most ordinary view "as something unique, native, close and sweet, like a childhood memory". According to Fedorov-Davydov, the canvas "Moscow Courtyard" "was a new word in Russian landscape painting and played a great role in it".

According to art historian Eleanor Paston, there are "unconditional echoes" between "Moscow Courtyard" and Alexei Savrasov's painting "The Rooks Have Returned," presented at the 1st Travelling Art Exhibition in 1871 (seven years before "Courtyard"). The common features that brought these works together were emotional content, simplicity of motif, and the use of images of Russian church architecture in combination with domestic buildings. At the same time, Savrasov's "Rooks", containing the image of awakening spring nature, is "a work of epic plan, expressing the national worldview of the artist", while in Polenovsky's "Courtyard" "the plot" is "as if "prompted" by a momentary feeling of the artist, who suddenly saw the beauty of an ordinary landscape". Paston wrote that in the "Moscow Courtyard" one can feel "the taste of a direct, childishly naïve perception of the world, its joy, its poetry and its mystery". She noted that in this work, "the compositional accuracy of the picture is combined with its color harmony in a single complete image, as it was felt by Polenov".

According to the art historian Faina Maltseva, the main strength and artistry of the picture created by Polenov in the "Moscow Courtyard" lies "in the harmonious unity of landscape and genre painting motif". She wrote that the well-thought-out distribution of the figures in the limited space of the courtyard gives the picture "crystalline clarity and integrity, without violating the immediacy of the impression of life". Listing the merits of the painting "Moscow Courtyard", in which Polenov managed to embody "all the best that was associated for him with the idea of landscape and domestic genre", Maltseva noted the artist's extensive use painting en plein air and "extraordinary purity of color palette".

Art historian Vitaly Manin called the "Moscow Courtyard" "a masterpiece of landscape art" and wrote that "one such painting is enough to go down in history". Referring to the characteristic combination of landscape and domestic genres in Russian painting of the second half of the XIX century, Manin wrote that the "Moscow Courtyard" is "not just a radiant landscape executed in bright plein air colors", but "encapsulates a whole philosophy". According to Manin, in this work Polenov "reigns the poetry of quiet, calm life, the charm of everyday life, which contains something eternal, immutable, inexhaustible source of happiness of human existence".

== Bibliography ==
- Андреева Е. Е. Спаса Преображения на Песках церковь // Москва. Энциклопедия / С. О. Шмидт, М. И. Андреев, В. М. Карев. — М.: Большая российская энциклопедия, 1997. — С. 759. — ISBN 5-85270-277-3
- Голицын С. М. Солнечная палитра. — М.: Детская литература, 1967. — 262 с.
- Гомберг-Вержбинская Э. П. Передвижники. — Л.: Искусство, 1970. — 236 с.
- Колпакова О. В. Поленов. — М.: Белый город, 2011. — 48 с. — (Мастера живописи). — ISBN 978-5-7793-2160-0
- Копшицер М. И. Поленов. — М.: Молодая гвардия, 2010. — 368 с. — (Жизнь замечательных людей). — ISBN 978-5-235-03383-2
- Лебедев Ю. В. Тургенев. — М.: Молодая гвардия, 1990. — 608 с. — (Жизнь замечательных людей). — ISBN 5-235-00789-1
- Лобанов В. М. В. Д. Поленов. «Московский дворик» // Замечательные полотна. — Л.: Художник РСФСР, 1966. — С. 234—235.
- Львов Г. Е. Воспоминания / Н. В. Вырубов, Е. Ю. Львова. — М.: Русский путь, 2002. — 376 с. — ISBN 5-85887-141-0
- Лясковская О. А. В. Д. Поленов. — М.: Государственная Третьяковская галерея, 1946. — 120 с.
- Лясковская О. А. В. Д. Поленов // История русского искусства / И. Э. Грабарь, В. С. Кеменов, В. Н. Лазарев. — М.: Наука, 1965. — Т. 9, кн. 2. — С. 119—148.
- Мальцева Ф. С. Мастера русского пейзажа. Вторая половина XIX века. Часть 2. — М.: Искусство, 2001. — 176 с. — ISBN 978-5-210-01343-9
- Манин В. С. Русская пейзажная живопись. Конец XVIII — XIX век. — СПб.: Аврора, 2012. — 344 с. — ISBN 978-5-7300-0847-2
- Михайлов К. П. Москва, которую мы потеряли. — М.: Яуза, Эксмо, 2010. — 496 с. — (Москва. Путеводитель памяти). — ISBN 978-5-699-43721-4
- Олсуфьева А. Г. Воспоминания об И. С. Тургеневе // Исторический вестник. — 1911. — Т. 123, № 3. — С. 855—864.
- Пастон Э. В. Василий Дмитриевич Поленов. — СПб.: Художник РСФСР, 1991. — 192 с. — (Русские живописцы XIX века). — ISBN 5-7370-0227-6
- Пастон Э. В. Поленов. — М.: Белый город, 2000. — 64 с. — ISBN 5-7793-0225-1
- Пастон Э. В. Абрамцево. Искусство и жизнь. — М.: Искусство, 2003. — 432 с. — ISBN 5-85200-309-3
- Пастон Э. В. «Поэтическая правда» Москвы // Третьяковская галерея. — 2007. — № 1. — С. 22—33.
- Пастон Э. В. Москва, как много в этом звуке… // Третьяковская галерея. — 2013. — № 3. — С. 78—89.
- Пастон Э. В. Василий Поленов. «Московский дворик». — М.: Государственная Третьяковская галерея, 2017. — 48 с. — (История одного шедевра). — ISBN 978-5-89580-169-7
- Пастон Э. В. Василий Поленов. От Золотого к Серебряному веку // Третьяковская галерея. — 2019. — № 3. — С. 4—77.
- Пастон Э. В. Мир Василия Поленова. — М.: Слово, 2019. — Т. 1 (Россия). — 224 с. — ISBN 978-5-387-01592-2
- Петинова Е. Ф. Русские художники XVIII — начала XX века. — СПб.: Аврора, 2001. — 345 с. — ISBN 978-5-7300-0714-7
- Пилипенко В. Н. Пейзажная живопись. — СПб.: Художник России, 1994. — 208 с. — (Русские живописцы XIX века). — ISBN 5-7370-0315-9
- Полунина Н. М. Коллекционеры России. XVII — начало XX вв. Энциклопедический словарь. — М.: РИПОЛ Классик, 2005. — 533 с. — ISBN 978-5-7300-0714-7
- Раздобреева И. В. Картина В. Д. Поленова «Московский дворик» // Государственная Третьяковская галерея. Материалы и исследования. — М.: Советский художник, 1956. — Т. I. — С. 198—208.
- Рогинская Ф. С. Товарищество передвижных художественных выставок. — М.: Искусство, 1989. — 430 с.
- Сахарова Е. В. Василий Дмитриевич Поленов, Елена Дмитриевна Поленова. Хроника семьи художников. — М.: Искусство, 1964. — 838 с.
- Фёдоров-Давыдов А. А. Русский пейзаж XVIII — начала XX века. — М.: Советский художник, 1986. — 304 с.
- Юрова Т. В. Василий Дмитриевич Поленов. — М.: Искусство, 1961. — 166 с.
- Алфавитный указатель к плану столичного города Москвы, составленному по распоряжению г. московского обер-полицмейстера, свиты его Императорского величества генерал-майора Лужина, А. Хотевым . — М.: Типография Ведомостей Московской городской полиции, 1852—1853. — 184 с.
- Василий Поленов / Л. Л. Правоверова, В. Б. Широбокова. — М.: Государственная Третьяковская галерея, 2019. — 320 с. — ISBN 978-5-89580-262-5
- Государственная Третьяковская галерея — каталог собрания / Я. В. Брук, Л. И. Иовлева. — М.: Красная площадь, 2006. — Т. 4: Живопись второй половины XIX века, книга 2, Н—Я. — 560 с. — ISBN 5-900743-22-5
- Государственный Русский музей — Живопись, XVIII — начало XX века (каталог). — Л.: Аврора и Искусство, 1980. — 448 с.
- Государственный Русский музей — каталог собрания / В. А. Леняшин. — СПб.: Palace Editions, 2013. — Т. 12: Живопись первой половины XX века (Н—Р). — 288 с. — ISBN 978-5-93332-470-6
- Народный художник Республики, академик Василий Дмитриевич Поленов. 1844—1927. Каталог / Н. В. Власов, А. А. Фёдоров-Давыдов. — М.: Советский художник, 1950. — 122 с.
- Переписка И. Н. Крамского: И. Н. Крамской и П. М. Третьяков, 1869—1887 / С. Н. Гольдштейн. — М.: Искусство, 1953. — 458 с.
- Товарищество передвижных художественных выставок. Письма, документы. 1869—1899 / В. В. Андреева, М. В. Астафьева, С. Н. Гольдштейн, Н. Л. Приймак. — М.: Искусство, 1987. — 668 с.
- Fouchard É. Les fonds iconographiques russes et soviétiques en France (fr.) // Cahiers du Monde russe et soviétique. — 1992. — Vol. 33, n^{o} 2—3. — P. 321—355.
