= Aleshki, Voronezh Oblast =

Aleshki Алешки
- Selo
- Location within Voronezh Oblast Location within Russia
- Coordinates: 51°37′N 41°46′E
- Country: Russia
- Region: Voronezh Oblast
- District: Ternovsky District
- Time zone: UTC+3:00

Aleshki (Russian: Алешки) is a rural locality (a selo) and the administrative center of Aleshkovskoye Rural Settlement, Ternovsky District, Voronezh Oblast, Russia. The population was 958 as of 2010. There are 25 streets.

== Geography ==
Aleshki is located 16 km southeast of Ternovka (the district's administrative centre) by road. Narodnoye is the nearest rural locality.
