= Borisoglebsky Uyezd (Tambov Governorate) =

Borisoglebsky Uyezd (Борисоглебский уезд) was one of the subdivisions of the Tambov Governorate of the Russian Empire. It was situated in the southern part of the governorate. Its administrative centre was Borisoglebsk.

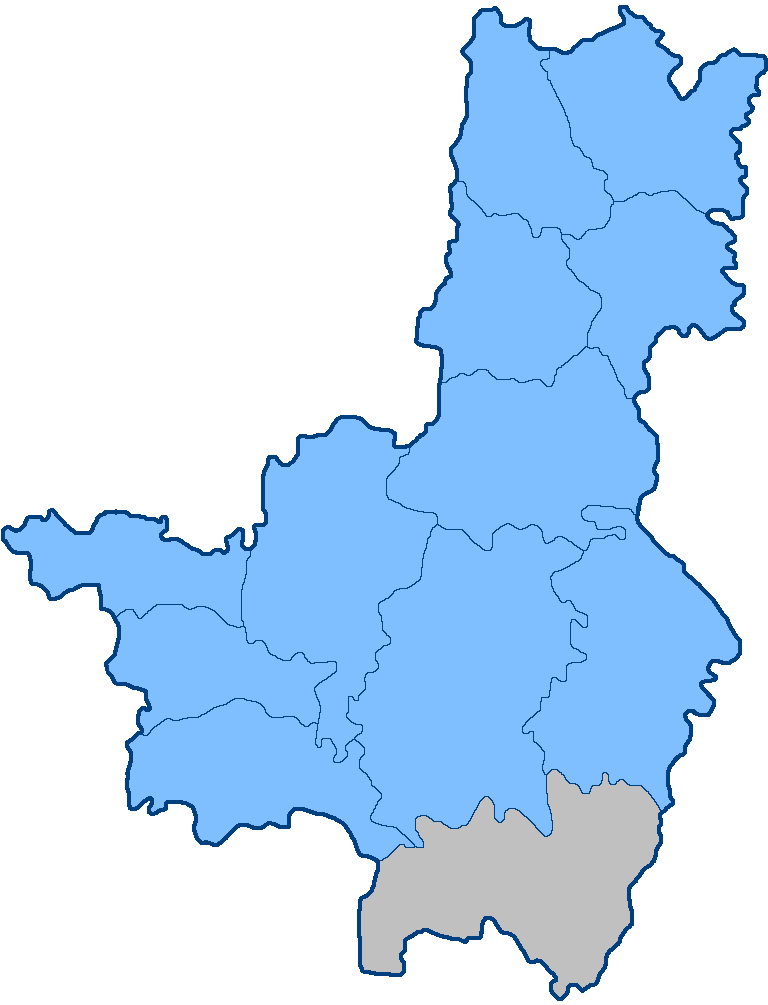

== Inhabited places ==
- Aleshki, Voronezh Oblast
- Gribanovsky (urban-type settlement)

== Demographics ==
At the time of the Russian Empire Census of 1897, Borisoglebsky Uyezd had a population of 306,715. Of these, 98.0% spoke Russian, 1.5% Ukrainian, 0.2% Tatar, 0.1% Yiddish and 0.1% Polish as their native language.
