= March (painting) =

1895 painting by Isaac Levitan

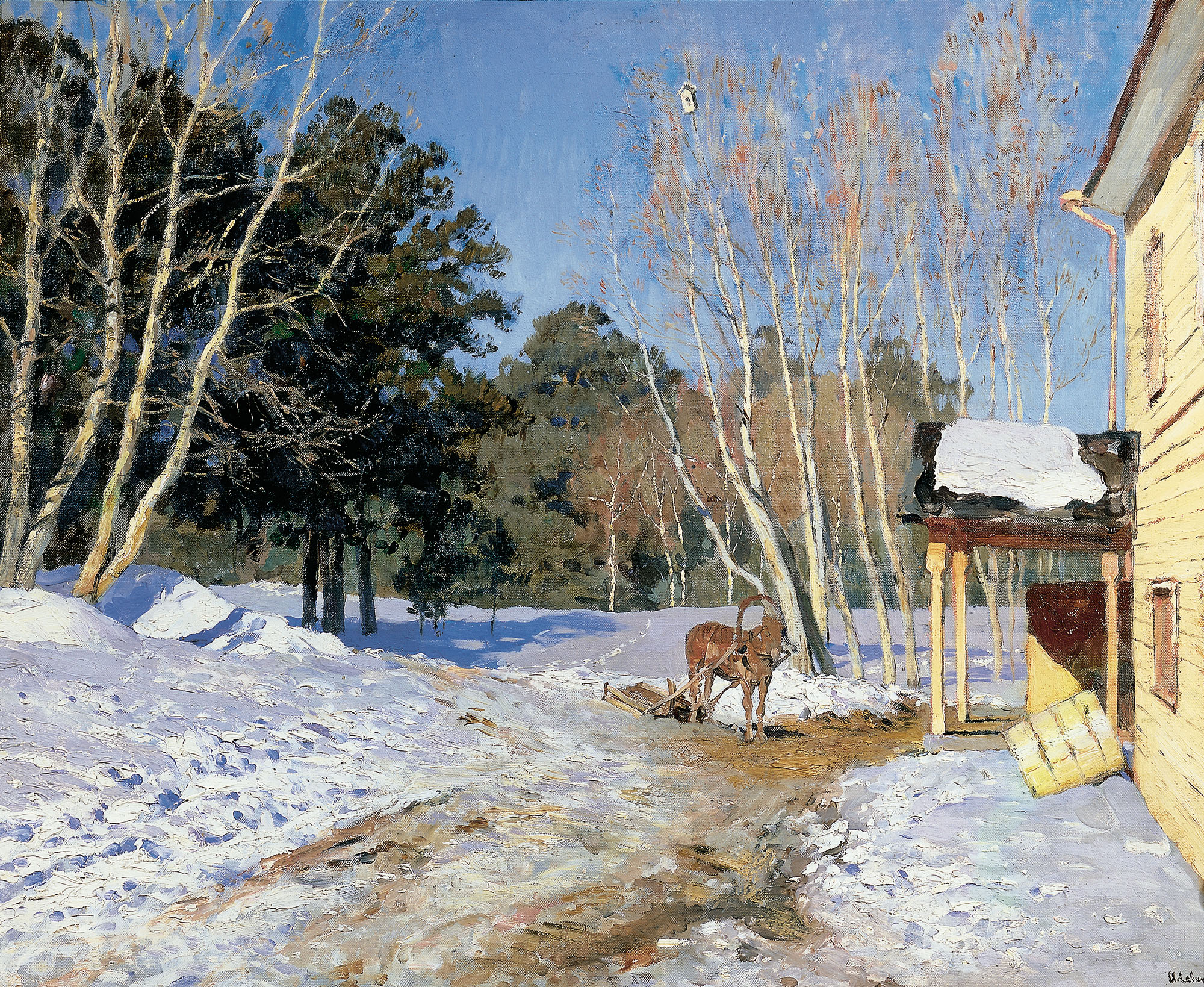
- Artist: Isaac Levitan
- Year: 1895
- Medium: Oil on canvas
- Dimensions: 60 cm × 75 cm (24 in × 30 in)
- Location: State Tretyakov Gallery, Moscow

March is a landscape painting by the Russian artist Isaaс Levitan (1860–1900), created in 1895. It is now in the State Tretyakov Gallery in Moscow (Inventory 1489) and measures 60 × 75 cm (or 61 × 76 cm according to other sources). Levitan painted the picture in March 1895 while living in the Gorka estate, in the Vyshnevolotsky Uyezd of Tver Governorate.

The painting March was exhibited at the 24th exhibition of the Society for Travelling Art Exhibitions (Peredvizhniki) in February 1896 in Saint Petersburg. It was later moved to Moscow in March of the same year. March was exhibited at the All-Russia industrial and art exhibition 1896 in Nizhny Novgorod. In the same year, Pavel Tretyakov purchased the painting from the author.

March is considered to be one of Levitan's 'life-affirming, cheerful works' from 1895 to 1897. This group also includes Golden Autumn (1895), Fresh Wind. Volga (1895), and Spring. Big Water (1897), among others. The painting March is widely regarded as one of Levitan's most famous and vivid landscape paintings. It also demonstrates the influence of Impressionism on the artist's oeuvre.

Artist Vasily Baksheev praised the painting, considering it not only one of Levitan's best works, but also one of the best works of the Russian school of painting. According to art historian Alexei Fedorov-Davydov, Levitan's painting March was a 'discovery in Russian landscape painting', combining a pictorial depiction of snow, spring sky, and trees. This motif later became a popular theme for many Russian landscape painters of the 20th century, including Igor Grabar and Konstantin Yuon. According to art historian Faina Maltseva, March is a 'inspired work in a major tone' that presents 'a whole and internally complete image, preserving at the same time all the immediacy and freshness of first impressions.'

== History ==
=== Background and creation ===
In 1894–1895, Levitan resided for several months at the Gorka estate, which is situated one and a half kilometres from the village of Ostrovno. The estate is now part of the Udomelsky District of the Tver Oblast, but at that time, it was part of the Vyshnevolotsky Uyezd of the Tver Governorate. The estate, located on the southern shore of Lake Ostrovno, was owned by Privy Councillor Ivan Nikolayevich Turchaninov. His wife, Anna Nikolayevna, often spent time there with their daughters Varvara, Sofya, and Anna. (Note: Anna Nikolayevna Turchaninova, née Makarova (25 May 1856 – 24 November 1930, Paris), was four years older than Levitan. Her daughters were Varvara Ivanovna (around 1875 – 1925), Sofia Ivanovna (1877 – around 1825) and Anna Ivanovna (2 December 1880, Vyshny Volochok – 1964, Leningrad).) The manor's main building is a two-storey house with a mezzanine, painted in a yellowish hue. It is depicted in Levitan's painting March and his earlier pastel Autumn. The Manor (1894), currently stored in the Omsk Regional Museum of Fine Arts named after M.A. Vrubel.

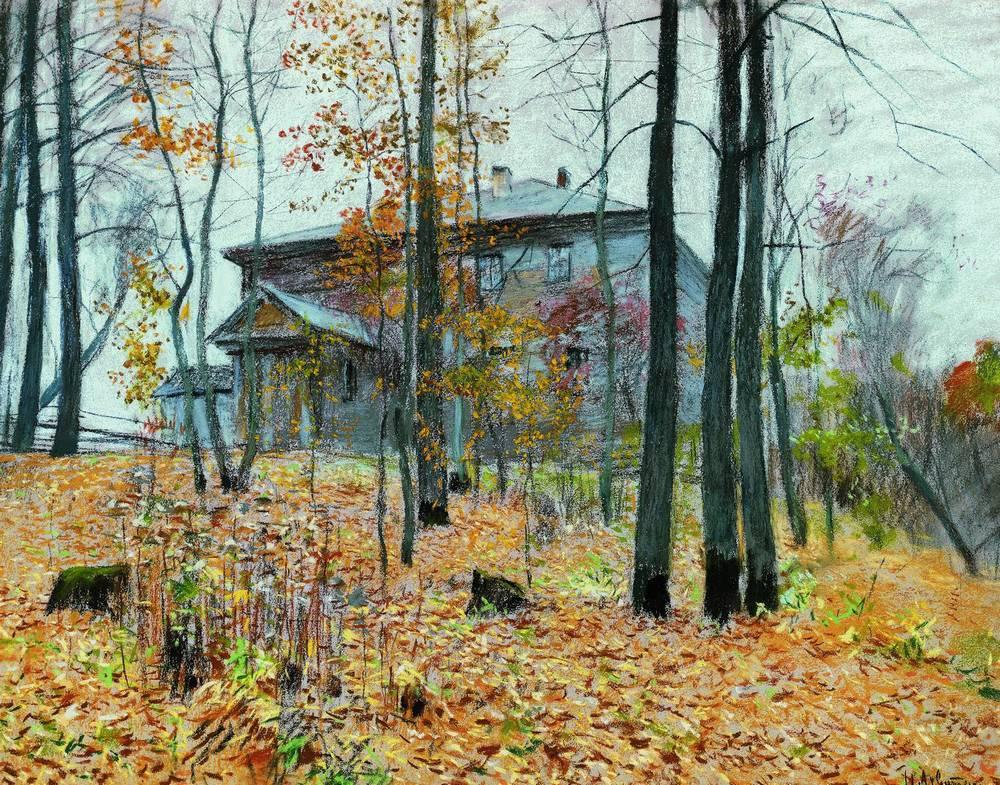
Isaac Levitan. Autumn. The Manor (pastel, 1894, Omsk Regional Museum of Fine Arts named after M.A. Vrubel)

In the early 1870s, the Turchaninovs acquired the land near Lake Ostrovno and replaced the old one-storey house left by the previous owners with a two-storey house. Additionally, they owned one of the lake islands, which featured a gazebo and benches. In the documents of the Statistical Committee of the Tver Province, there is the following description of the estate: 'The estate 'Gorka' on the southern peninsula of Lake Ostrovnoe. The place is beautiful. To the south behind the manor there is a pine forest, directly overlooking the lake, its islands, the eastern shore with a pogost and the manor of the village 'Ostrovno', and the western steep shore covered with birch forest. To the east and west of the house there are birch groves, cleared, with made paths... The 'Gorka' estate is perfect as a holiday home. Dry, sandy land, healthy pine air and a beautiful forest, a garden and a wonderful view of the lake with its green islands, a white church and a tall old tavern of the village 'Ostrovno.'

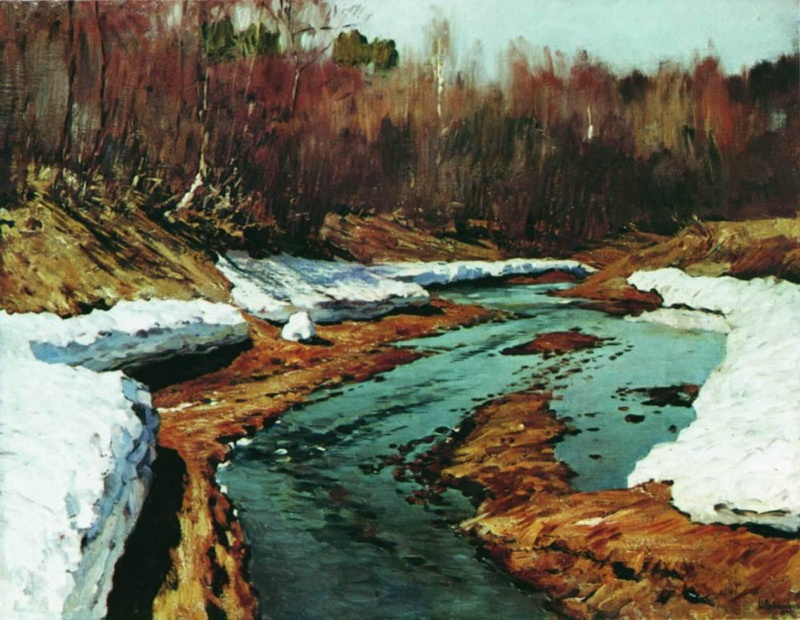
Isaac Levitan. Spring. The Last Snow (sketch, 1895, State Russian Museum)

Levitan first met Anna Nikolaevna Turchaninova in the summer of 1894 in Ostrovno. He was a guest at the Ushakov estate (Note: The Ostrovno estate was owned by Ekaterina Nikolaevna Ushakova (née Seslavina, 1821–1910) and her children Varvara Vladimirovna (1849 – about 1919), Sofia Vladimirovna (1851 – about 1919) and Nikolay Vladimirovich (1859–1917). Levitan and Kuvshinnikova stayed at the Ushakovs' estate during the summer of 1893 while the artist was working on the painting Over Eternal Peace, and returned in 1894.) with his companion, the artist Sofia Kuvshinnikova. Levitan and Turchaninova had a romantic relationship, which resulted in a quarrel and the end of Levitan's relationship with Kuvshinnikova. Following this, Levitan relocated to the Gorka estate where he resided during August and September 1894. He returned to the estate in the early spring of the following year. As there were no appropriate rooms at the estate, an artist's workshop was constructed. The two-storey building was situated on the shore of the lake, at the confluence of the Syezha River (the same one depicted in Levitan's later painting Golden Autumn). It was humorously referred to as a 'synagogue'.

In March 1895, Levitan created the painting March. The artwork was painted entirely from nature, without preliminary studies, in a few sessions. This may have been the first time Levitan created a canvas directly en plein air. The youngest daughter of the Turchaninovs, Anya (known as Lyulyu within the family), who was 14 years old at the time, witnessed the artist's work on the painting March. She assisted the artist in carrying a box of paints, listened to his stories about the beauty of nature, and observed the creation of a future masterpiece. In later publications, the youngest daughter of the Turchaninovs was occasionally mistakenly referred to as Julia, likely due to its similarity to the name Lyulyu.

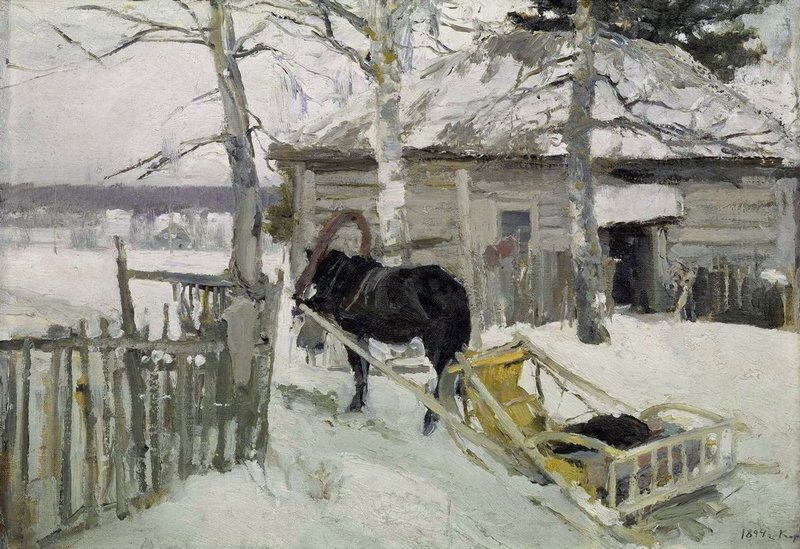
Konstantin Korovin. Winter (1894, State Tretyakov Gallery)

The writer Sofia Prorokova, author of a biography of Levitan published in 1960, recounted her meeting with Anna Ivanovna Turchaninova (Note: Sofia Prorokova's memoirs provide a detailed account of how she located Anna Ivanovna Turchaninova (Lyulyu). While visiting Lake Ostrovno, local residents informed her that E A. Zvorykina, the sister of Anna Ivanovna's first husband, resided in Leningrad. Prorokova obtained Zvorykina's address through the address bureau, which ultimately led her to Anna Ivanovna's residence.) (first married Zvorykina, second married Kolokoltsova): 'Years would pass, Anya would grow up, and this sunny spring would remain a vivid memory of her distant youth. We are sitting in her Leningrad flat, talking to an elderly woman whose dark eyes retain both cunning and fire. Memories of Levitan have become like a family heirloom. She is one of the Turchaninova family's living witnesses to how the artist's best paintings were created in Gorka.' Prorokova quoted Anna Ivanovna's words: 'March was painted in front of me.'

During the spring of 1895, Levitan also painted Spring. The Last Snow, which is now held in a private collection in Moscow. The painting was previously in the collection of Moscow patron of the arts Vladimir Shmarovin. A sketch of the same name is held in the State Russian Museum (25.5 × 33.3 cm, canvas, oil, inv. Zh-4261). In 1895, Levitan created several paintings while working on the Gorka estate, including Golden Autumn (now in the State Tretyakov Gallery) and Nenuphar (now in the Astrakhan Picture Gallery named after P. M. Dogadin).

The painting March is sometimes said to be preceded by the 1894 landscape Winter by Russian impressionist painter Konstantin Korovin (now in the State Tretyakov Gallery). Winter also depicts a horse and sleigh standing near a village house. However, unlike Levitan's sunny spring canvas, Korovin's painting portrays a gloomy winter day.

=== 24th traveling exhibition and subsequent events ===
Together with nine other works by Levitan, including Golden Autumn, Fresh Wind. Volga, Spring. The Last Snow, Ferns in a Forest, Twilight, and Nenuphar, the canvas March was exhibited at the 24th exhibition of the Society for Travelling Art Exhibitions ('Peredvizhniki') in Saint Petersburg on 11 February 1896. (Note: The Julian calendar ("old style") is used to date events that took place in the Russian Empire.) The exhibition then moved to Moscow in March of the same year. The exhibition was split between two locations: the Saint Petersburg exhibit was held in the building of the Society for the Encouragement of the Arts, while the Moscow exhibit was held in the premises of the Moscow School of Painting, Sculpture and Architecture. Levitan's canvases, which were quite diverse, received mixed reviews from critics. In particular, in the note 'The Exhibition of Peredvizhniki', published in the 'Vsemirnaya Illustratsiya' (Vol. 55, No. 1413 for 1896), Vladimir Chuiko praised Levitan for his choice of subjects and his peculiar way of painting, noting that 'almost all his paintings (10 in number) attract attention, with the exception of two: March and Spring, which are too rough and harsh in tone.' According to Chuiko, 'the shortcomings noted in Mr Levitan's manner will disappear, we hope, in the near future, when his talent finally strengthens.' Nevertheless, the majority of the reviews about Levitan's work were positive, indicating 'recognition of the artist's talent, the originality of his work and his radiant individuality.'

The painting March was also exhibited at the All-Russia industrial and art exhibition, which opened on 28 May 1896 in Nizhny Novgorod. Levitan himself visited the exhibition, where a total of eighteen of his paintings were displayed. In addition to works from the travelling exhibition, a number of Levitan's works from the late 1880s and early 1890s were presented in Nizhny Novgorod. This was the first wide retrospective display of the artist's work. In 1896, Pavel Tretyakov purchased the paintings March and Golden Autumn from the author. The 24th travelling exhibition continued its journey to other cities of the Russian Empire in autumn and winter, visiting Kharkiv (October–November), Kyiv (December–January) and Tula (January–February). The exhibition catalogue issued in Kharkiv described the paintings as 'property of the Moscow City Gallery of brothers P. and S. Tretyakovs'.

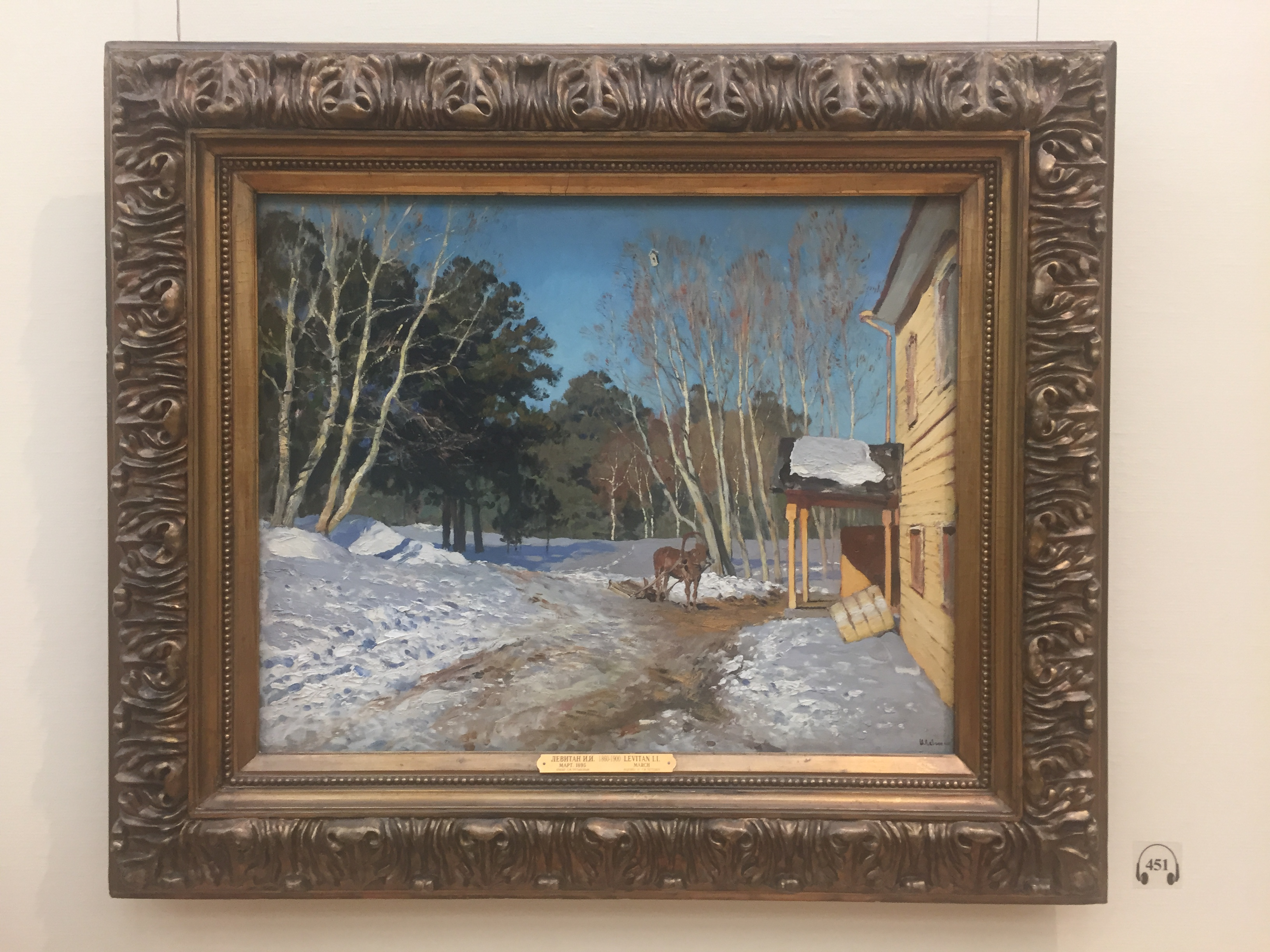
The painting March in the Levitan Hall (Note: Hall No. 37 of the main building in Lavrushinsky Lane) of the State Tretyakov Gallery

The Gorka estate did not survive the revolutionary upheavals of the early 20th century. Levitan's house workshop, where he worked in the mid-1890s, burned down in 1904. Ivan Nikolayevich Turchaninov deceased in 1910, and in 1914, the estate was sold to Aggey Aggeyevich Markov, a second guild merchant. Before the sale, Anna Ivanovna Turchaninova (Lyulyu) visited Gorka. The artist Vitold Byalynitsky-Birulya, who was in the area, described the meeting. In particular, he recognised the place in Levitan's painting: "As we approached the black porch of the house, my heart trembled at the image that suddenly appeared before me. ...This place was familiar to me. Only, everything was in winter dress, and the barrel was on a sledge. That March was before my eyes". Apparently, the artist Stanislav Zhukovsky was also present. In another description of the same meeting, Byalynitsky-Birulya wrote: "We walked past the black porch, where the view falls on a magnificent barren, which everyone knows from Levitan's painting March. We all involuntarily cried out in joy: "Look, this is what March was painted from!" In June 1923, a few years after the revolution, the mansion was destroyed by fire, the cause suspected to be arson.

The painting March was exhibited at several exhibitions, including Levitan's personal exhibition in 1938 at the State Tretyakov Gallery, and the jubilee exhibition in 1960–1961 in Moscow, Leningrad, and Kyiv. However, it only participated in the Moscow part of the exposition. The painting was exhibited in London in 1959 as part of an exhibition of Russian and Soviet artists. It was also featured in the 1971–1972 exhibitions 'Peredvizhniki in the State Tretyakov Gallery' (Moscow) and 'Landscape Painting of the Peredvizhniki' (Kyiv, Leningrad, Minsk, Moscow) to commemorate the centenary of the Society for Travelling Art Exhibitions. It was exhibited at the anniversary exhibitions for the 150th anniversary of Levitan's birth, held in the Benois Building of the State Russian Museum (April–July 2010) and in the New Tretyakovka on Krymsky Val (October 2010 – March 2011). In September 2017, the painting March was displayed at the 'exhibition of one masterpiece' at the Primorsky State Art Gallery in Vladivostok.

During Levitan's jubilee exhibition in Moscow in 2010–2011, an opinion poll was conducted to determine visitors' preferences. The results of the poll showed that March was the third most popular work of the artist, behind only the large-format canvases At the Pool (1892, State Tretyakov Gallery) and Over Eternal Peace (1894, State Tretyakov Gallery). The painting March is currently exhibited in the Levitan Hall (Room No. 37) of the main building of the Tretyakov Gallery in Lavrushinsky Lane.

== Description ==
The painting by Levitan depicts the backyards of the Gorka estate, with the yellow wall of the main house visible on the right side of the painting. The scene is set on a sunny day in March, with melting snow, trees, and a country road leading up to the porch. A horse with a sleigh stands still, basking in the sun, on the country road approaching the porch. The horse, named Dianka, is positioned in the centre of the painting and is an integral part of the landscape. At the same time, according to the literary critic Andrei Turkov, "the house did not enter the composition of the picture at a favourable angle – a part of the wall with poorly visible windows, a porch with a half-thawed roof, a drainpipe, recently fallen boards from the windows, boarded up for the winter". According to art historian Mikhail Alpatov, the wall of the house with planks that extend deep into the canvas, and the thawed country road "draw the viewer into the painting, help him to enter it mentally."

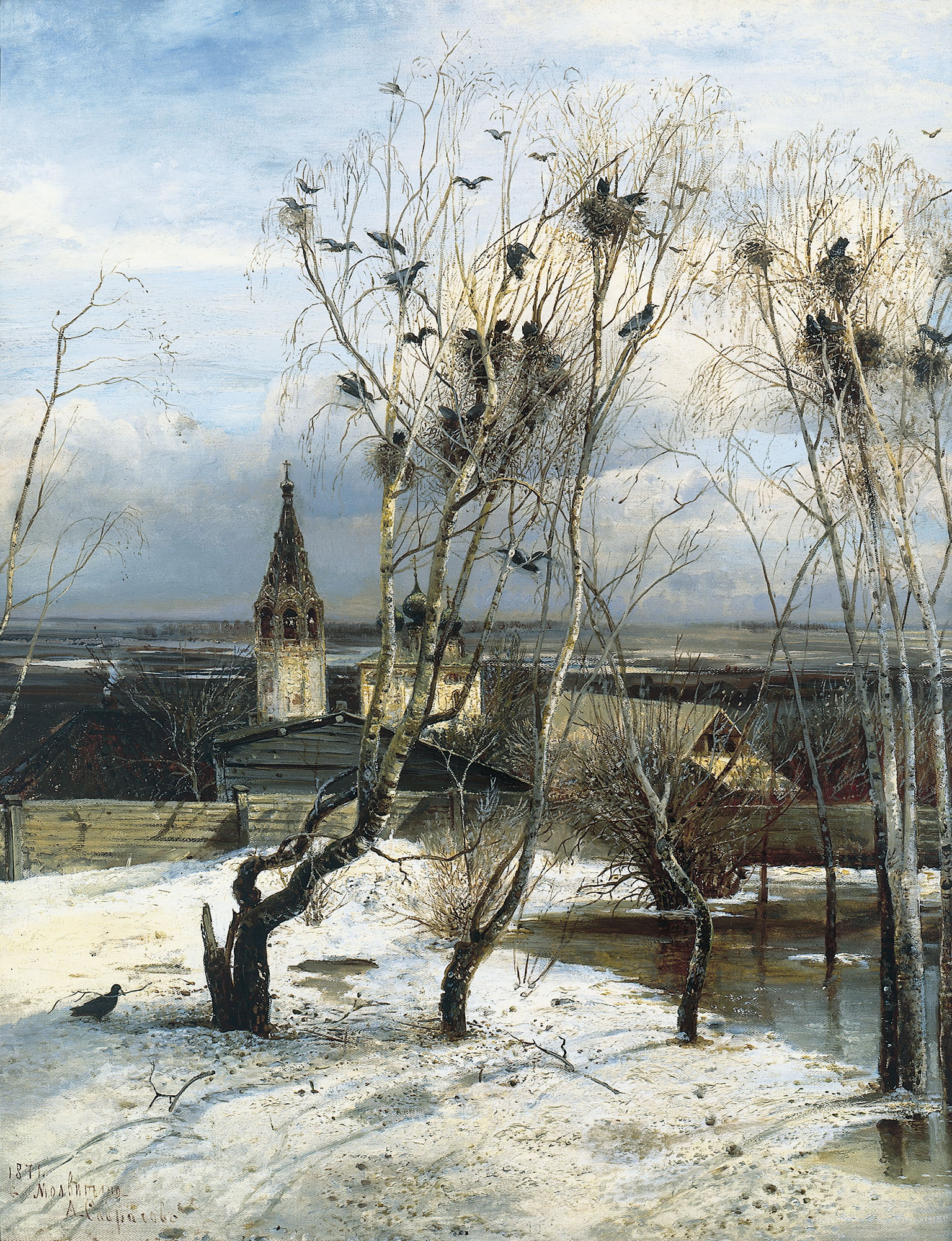
Alexei Savrasov. The Rooks Have Returned (1871, State Tretyakov Gallery)

The painting's main motif depicts the contrast between winter and spring, sunlight and snow. This is highlighted by the colour contrast between the dark pine trees in the background and the light, sunlit trunks of the deciduous trees (while some authors refer to them as aspens or birch trees, others do not specify which trees are depicted on the canvas) in front of them, which appear to be reaching for the spring sun with their branches. A birdhouse is positioned unusually high on one of the trees, giving the impression that it is attached to a branch that is too thin. The light-coloured trunks of the trees on either side of the canvas appear to lean towards each other. The scene conveys a sense of slight motion, with the deciduous trees, pines, ajar door partly covered with shadows, and shutter lying next to the porch all appearing to move. The horizontal edge of the snow-covered field, extending to the distant coniferous trees, divides the painting into two roughly equal parts and "brings a note of tranquillity to it." The shades of snow, the blue shadows of the trees and the blue sky create a very picturesque image. This subject is repeated many times in the landscapes of other Russian artists.

The three main colours that define the colour scheme of the canvas are yellow, blue and green, with white added in places. Yellow is found not only on the wall of the house and on the ajar door, but also on the tops of the trees and in shades of horse hair. Most of the blue is present in the depiction of the cloudless spring sky; this blue is combined with the blue used to paint the shadows of the trees, as well as with the greyish blue tones of the snow in the background. The crowns of the conifers are painted in shades of green from light to dark. The most complex combinations of primary colours are found in the paintings of the deciduous trees and the rutted road. Despite the presence of many subtle shades and reflexes, the colour palette of the painting is "extremely sonorous, much more sonorous than in any of Levitan's previous paintings". The primary colours do not only have intensity but also definition, which is most evident in the colouring of the yellow wall of the house, the blue sky and the green pines. When analysing the colours used to paint March, art historian Tatyana Kovalenskaya observed that they coincided with the shades of painting of Yaroslavl frescoes listed by Levitan himself: “whitewash, ochre, blue, something like green earth.”

Although close in subject to Alexei Savrasov's famous canvas The Rooks Have Returned (1871, State Tretyakov Gallery), the painting March differs significantly from it in painting technique. It is a vivid example of the so-called ‘Levitan’s landscape’ – a ‘landscape of mood’, in which the artist, despite depicting the ‘jubilant state of nature,’ managed to preserve the lyrical shade of experience and sadness in the painting. Unlike Savrasov's Rooks, where the narrative character dominates and the landscape is largely interpreted through genre means, in March there is "a desire for a direct sensual and visual representation of natural phenomena", with "an intimate perception of the everyday environment conveyed in the feeling of warm air melting the heavy spring snow".

Fragments of the painting March

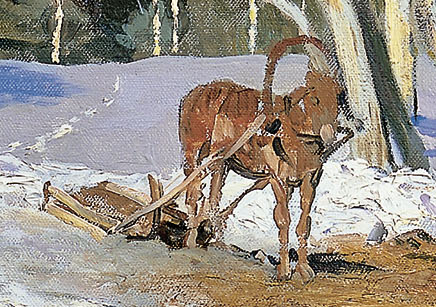
Horse with the sleigh

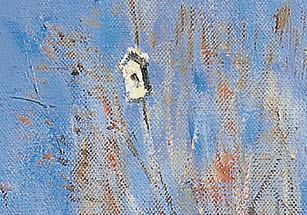
Tree branches and the birdhouse

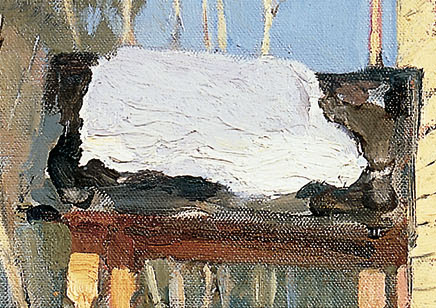
Snow on the porch roof

The thickness of the paint layer on the canvas March is uneven: relief strokes up to two millimetres thick are used to represent the snow, while the transparent branches of the trees reveal the texture of the canvas. As one moves away from the foreground, the artist's strokes become less distinct and the treatment more generalised. For the snowy shadows, Levitan used glaze and semi-glaze over a layer of whitewash. According to the memoirs of the artist Yakov Minchenkov, when Levitan painted the snow on the canvas March, he checked the proportions of light and dark using photographic images. However, according to Minchenkov, “nowhere do you see signs of photography, nowhere did it lead the artist to crude naturalism, did not force him to opt for unnecessary details.”

The paintings March and Golden Autumn, created in 1895, are considered to be the most significant examples of the influence of Impressionism on Levitan's work. March displays Impressionist characteristics such as "temperamental, open thick strokes, that almost sculpturaly 'mould' the blue March snow." Relief strokes of whitewash create a sense of snow porosity and contribute to a more active experience of the image. At the same time, objective techniques are combined with simplicity, demonstrated in the use of certain colours. However, according to art historian Galina Churak, although the pictorial language of the canvas "places Levitan next to the Impressionists", the artist "does not make the decisive step that would allow us to call him an Impressionist". Comparing March with "the most Impressionist work" Levitan had created in the 1880s – Birch Grove, art historian Dmitry Sarabianov wrote that in the mid-1890s the artist "did not make significant steps towards the development of the Impressionist system" and "as if stopped at the level of Proto-Impressionism."

== Reviews ==
In his memoirs, the painter Vasily Baksheev noted that Isaac Levitan remained in his memory as "an artist inseparably connected with the Russian national school of landscape", while "deeply loving the nature of his homeland, tirelessly studying it and embodying it with great skill in his works". According to Baksheev, there is "so much spring warmth, so much light, warming sun" in Levitan's March. Commenting on the painting, Baksheev wrote that he considered it not only one of Levitan's best works, but also "one of the best works of our [(Russian)] school [of painting]". – It was "as much a pearl" as Fyodor Vasilyev's Thaw or Alexei Savrasov's The Rooks Have Returned.

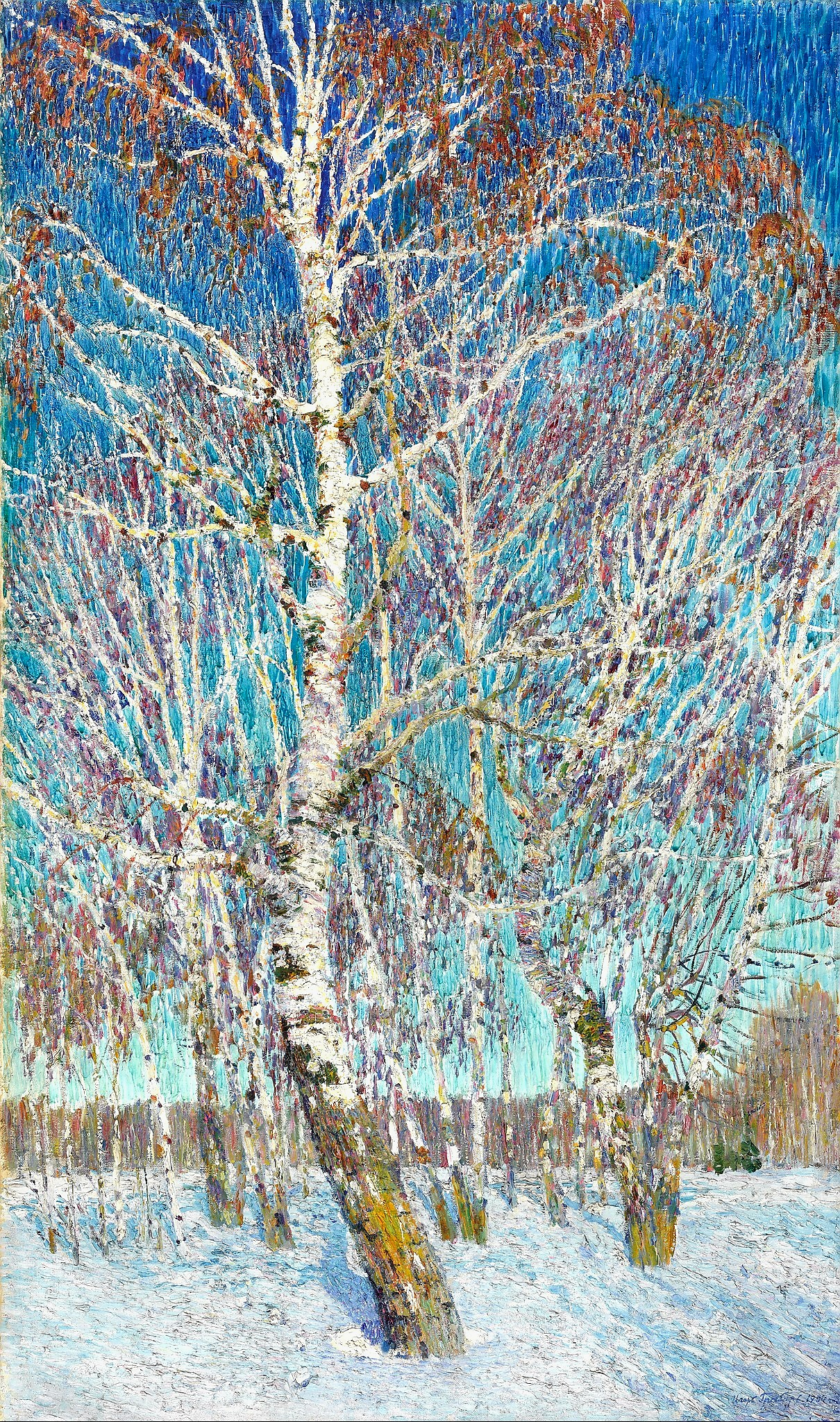
Igor Grabar. February Azure (1904, State Tretyakov Gallery)

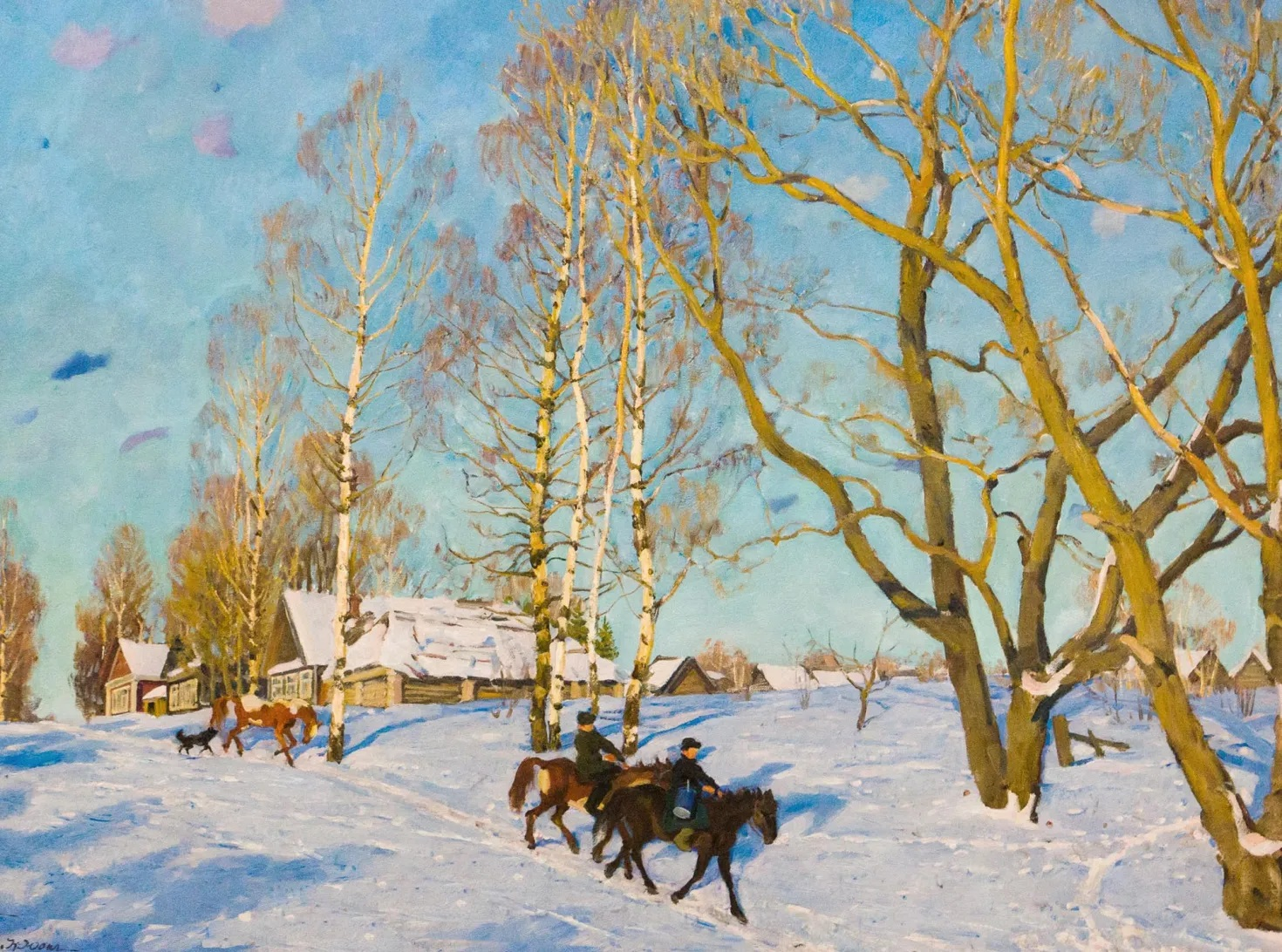
Konstantin Yuon. March Sun (1915, State Tretyakov Gallery)

Art historian Alexei Fedorov-Davydov noted that Levitan "seldom painted winter and snow in general, preferring to depict its remnants in spring landscapes", but in 1895 he took up such a theme, painting "March", "in which everything breathes a premonition of spring and which is a depiction of a still wintry, sunny day". According to the art historian, "by turning to this new motif, Levitan created a landscape that became a discovery in Russian landscape painting" – "no one before him had painted snow illuminated by the sun in such a colourful and picturesque manner, with blue shadows; no one had depicted the spring sky and trees in such a way." Fedorov-Davydov wrote that "after Levitan, such a motif became a favourite theme in Russian landscape painting," citing as examples works such as Igor Grabar's February Azure and Konstantin Yuon's March Sun. (Note: The landscape painter Stanislav Zhukovsky was also impressed by Levitan's March. He used a similar motif in his painting Warmed (1899), which was presented at the 27th Travelling Exhibition. However, it was criticised for being an 'obvious imitation' of March.)

According to art historian Mikhail Alpatov, the compositional structure of Levitan's March is characterised by its exceptional simplicity, clarity and precision, in which "everything seems simple, natural and even uncomplicated". At the same time, the compositional lines used by the artist give the landscape finality and completeness. According to Alpatov, in March Levitan formed the image as if from separate fragments "cut by the frame", but at the same time all these parts "form a single whole, a kind of unity." Alpatov wrote that to this landscape "nothing can be added, nothing can be taken away from it" – in none of Levitan's previous works did the artist "find such a happy completeness in nature like near this village house at the edge of the road, at the forest edge."

In her book "Plein Air in Russian Painting of the 19th Century", art historian Olga Lyaskovskaya wrote that Levitan's March, like Vasily Polenov's Moscow Courtyard, could serve as an example of plein air painting. Lyaskovskaya praised the accuracy of the relations between sky, earth and trees, and the precision with which "the reflections in the snow and the dark blue shadows in the depths" were painted. However, she also noted that the wall of the house and the casement of the open door were not fully completed by the artist: "The pale yellow colour remained a colour and did not become a tone into which the colour of the wall and its change under the influence of sunlight and the surrounding atmosphere should merge". At the same time, according to Lyaskovskaya, the pale trunks of the exposed trees are "excellently painted."

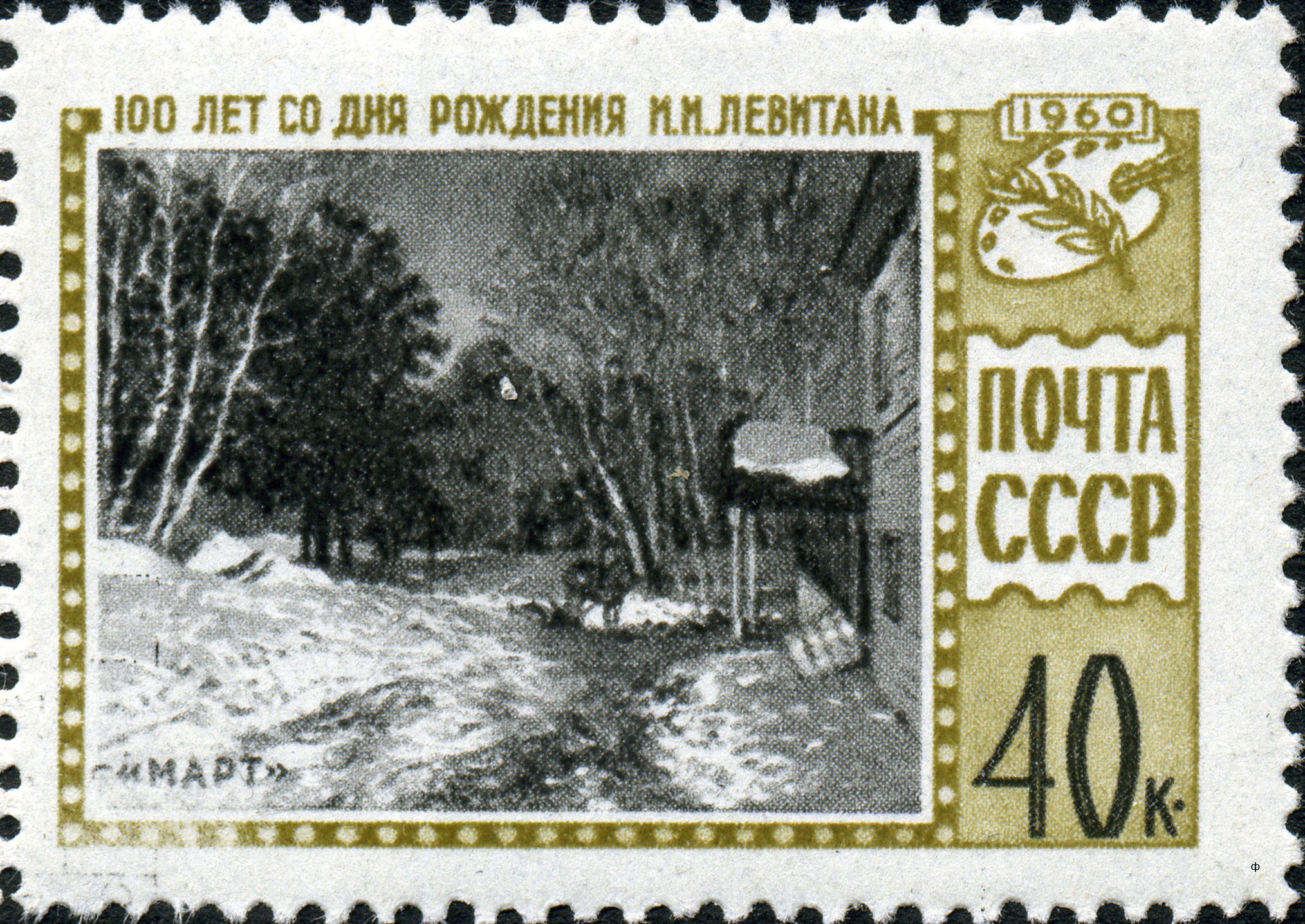
The painting March on the USSR postage stamp of 1960

Art historian Faina Maltseva called March a "great and inspired work" and wrote that it would be difficult to find another landscape in painting of the time that "so reverently conveys the awakening of nature". Noting the brevity of the artistic means used by Levitan to create the canvas, Maltseva wrote that the painting March presents "a whole and internally complete image, at the same time preserving all the immediacy and freshness of the first impressions." According to Maltseva, the sunny palette the artist created in this landscape was perceived by his contemporaries as "a discovery in the representation of Russian nature."

In a book published in 2001, art historian Vladimir Kruglov wrote that Levitan's March "has not lost its prominent place, if not in the history of Russian art, then in the souls of people who can feel the beauty of their homeland." According to him, March established a tradition in Russian painting that has been taken up by a number of artists and continues to this day. Kruglov noted that the successful choice of an almost square canvas format "enhances the impressive expressiveness of the picture", and a short, energetic stroke and lively texture "give a sense of light and air flowing, the play of light and shadow, flickering reflections."

Writing about March, the artist Boris Ioganson said that he was struck by the "luminous dazzle of the March sun" in this work. According to him, every time he looks at the canvas he stands before this miracle "as if hypnotised", and when he "manages to be in nature in March, or to sit on the boulevard in the city on a sunny March morning, a witty paradox flashes through his mind: "How amazingly nature imitates Levitan's March." According to the literary critic Andrei Turkov, "Levitan's March seems to capture forever the joyful moment when everything is in front of you, everything is possible."

== Bibliography ==
- Алленов, М.М. (1989). "Русское искусство XIX — начала XX века". In М.М. Алленов; О.С. Евангулова; Л.И. Лифшиц (eds.). Русское искусство X — начала XX века. Архитектура, скульптура, живопись, графика (in Russian). Moscow: Искусство. pp. 257–473.
- Алпатов, М.В. (1945). Левитан. Массовая библиотека (in Russian). Moscow: Искусство.
- Горелов, М.И. (1982). С.Ю. Жуковский. Жизнь и творчество. 1875—1944 (in Russian). Moscow: Искусство.
- Захаренкова, Л.И. (2010). "История персональных выставок И. И. Левитана и подготовка в Третьяковской галерее выставки, приуроченной к 150-летию со дня рождения художника" (PDF). Третьяковские чтения 2009 (in Russian). Moscow: Экспресс 24: 219–225. ISBN 978-5-89580-105-5.
- Ильина, Т.В. (2000). История искусств. Отечественное искусство (in Russian). Moscow: Высшая школа. ISBN 5-06-003705-3.
- Иовлева, Л.И. (2010). "О левитановском пейзаже и юбилейной левитановской выставке" (PDF). Третьяковская галерея (in Russian) (3): 4–13.
- Иогансон, Б.В. (1970). И.А. Куратова (ed.). Исаак Ильич Левитан (in Russian). Moscow: Искусство.
- Ионина, Н.А. (2006). 100 великих картин (in Russian). Moscow: Вече. ISBN 9785953311250.
- Карлсен, Г.; Кочик, О.Я.; Виктурина, М.П. (1963). "Особенности техники живописи Левитана". Художник (in Russian) (3): 30–34.
- Кац, Л.И. (1983). Художники в Удомельском крае (in Russian). Kalinin: Московский рабочий.
- Киселёв, М.Ф. (2001). Константин Коровин. Мастера живописи (in Russian). Moscow: Белый город. ISBN 5-7793-0334-7.
- Коваленская, Т.М. (1983). Русский реализм и проблема идеала (in Russian). Moscow: Изобразительное искусство.
- Колокольцов, В.И. (2000). "Вокруг "Дома с мезонином"". Известия Русского генеалогического общества (in Russian) (11). Saint Petersburg.
- Королёва, С. (2009). Исаак Ильич Левитан (Великие художники, том 15) (in Russian). Moscow: Директмедиа Паблишинг и Комсомольская правда. ISBN 978-5-87107-188-5.
- Круглов, В.Ф. (2001). Исаак Левитан. Золотая галерея русской живописи (in Russian). Moscow: Арт-Родник. ISBN 5-88896-051-9.
- Лужецкая, А.Н. (1965). Техника масляной живописи русских мастеров с XVIII по начало XX века (in Russian). Moscow: Искусство.
- Лясковская, О.А. (1966). Пленер в русской живописи XIX века (in Russian). Moscow: Искусство.
- Мальцева, Ф.С. (1968). И.Э. Грабарь; В.Н. Лазарев; А.А. Сидоров; О.А. Швидковский (eds.). История русского искусства. И. И. Левитан и пейзажная живопись 1890–х годов (in Russian). Vol. 10, book 1. Moscow: Наука. pp. 108–178.
- Мальцева, Ф.С. (2002). Мастера русского пейзажа. Вторая половина XIX века. Часть 4 (in Russian). Moscow: Искусство. ISBN 9785210013484.
- Манин, В.С. (2012). Русская пейзажная живопись. Конец XVIII — XIX век (in Russian). Saint Petersburg: Аврора. ISBN 978-5-7300-0847-2.
- Минченков, Я.Д. (2016). Воспоминания о передвижниках (in Russian). Moscow: Directmedia. ISBN 978-5-4475-7816-9.
- Петров, В.А. (1992). Исаак Ильич Левитан. Русские живописцы XIX века (in Russian). Saint Petersburg: Художник России.
- Петрунина, Л.Я. (2012). "Выставка И. И. Левитана глазами зрителей" (PDF). Третьяковские чтения 2010—2011 (in Russian). Moscow: Инико: 606–618. ISBN 978-5-89580-106-2.
- Пилипенко, В.Н. (1994). Пейзажная живопись. Русские живописцы XIX века (in Russian). Saint Petersburg: Художник России. ISBN 5-7370-0315-9.
- Подушков, Д.Л. (2009). Знаменитые россияне в истории Удомельского края (in Russian). Tver: СФК-офис. ISBN 9785915040082.
- Подушков, Д.Л. (2014). "Художник Исаак Ильич Левитан в Удомле". Левитановские чтения. Материалы научно-практической конференции (3—4 октября 2011 года) (in Russian). Plyos: Плёсский государственный историко-архитектурный и художественный музей-заповедник: 116–126. ISBN 9785897292141.
- Подушков, Д.Л. (2018). "Колдовское озеро". Художник И. И. Левитан и писатель А. П. Чехов на Удомельской земле (in Russian). Vyshny Volochyok: Ирида-прос. ISBN 978-5-93488-212-0.
- Пророкова, С.А. (1960). Левитан. Жизнь замечательных людей (in Russian). Moscow: Молодая гвардия.
- Пророкова, С.А. (1989). Корни. Воспоминания, дневники, письма (in Russian). Yaroslavl: Верхне-Волжское книжное издательство.
- Прытков, В.А. (1960). Исаак Ильич Левитан. К 100-летию со дня рождения (in Russian). Moscow: Советский художник.
- Рогинская, Ф.С. (1989). Товарищество передвижных художественных выставок (in Russian). Moscow: Искусство.
- Сарабьянов, Д.В. (1989). История русского искусства второй половины XIX века (in Russian). Moscow: Издательство Московского университета.
- Стернин, Г.Ю. (2009). От Репина до Врубеля (in Russian). Moscow: Галарт.
- Турков, А.М. (1974). Исаак Ильич Левитан. Жизнь в искусстве (in Russian). Moscow: Искусство.
- Фёдоров-Давыдов, А.А. (1966). Исаак Ильич Левитан. Жизнь и творчество (in Russian). Moscow: Искусство.
- Фёдоров-Давыдов, А.А. (1975). "И. И. Левитан". Русское и советское искусство. Статьи и очерки (in Russian). Moscow: Искусство. pp. 523–539.
- Филиппов, В.А. (2003). Импрессионизм в русской живописи (in Russian). Moscow: Белый город. ISBN 5-7793-0577-3.
- Чижмак, М.С. (2010). "Хроника жизни и творчества Исаака Левитана" (PDF). Третьяковская галерея (in Russian) (3): 58–71.
- Чуйко, В.В. (1896). "Выставка передвижников (окончание)". Всемирная иллюстрация (in Russian). 55 (1413): 230–231.
- Чурак, Г.С. (2010). ""Художник чудный и гениальный"". Наше наследие (in Russian) (95): 30–43.
- Я.В. Брук; Л.И. Иовлева, eds. (2001). Государственная Третьяковская галерея — каталог собрания. Vol. 4: Живопись второй половины XIX века, книга 1, А–М. Moscow: Красная площадь. ISBN 5-900743-56-X.
- Государственный Русский музей — Живопись, XVIII — начало XX века (каталог). Leningrad: Аврора и Искусство. 1980.
- Г.Н. Голдовский; В.А. Леняшин, eds. (2016). Государственный Русский музей — каталог собрания. Vol. 6: Живопись второй половины XIX века (К—М). Saint Petersburg: Palace Editions. ISBN 978-5-93332-565-9.
- А.А. Фёдоров-Давыдов, ed. (1956). Исаак Ильич Левитан. Письма, документы, воспоминания (in Russian). Moscow: Искусство.
- А.А. Фёдоров-Давыдов, ed. (1966). Исаак Ильич Левитан. Документы, материалы, библиография (in Russian). Moscow: Искусство.
- Каталог XXIV передвижной выставки "Товарищества передвижных художественных выставок". Kharkiv: Типография Ю.А. Счасни. 1896.
- И.Г. Девятьярова, ed. (2012). Омский областной музей изобразительных искусств имени М. А. Врубеля. Русская живопись XVIII — начала XX века (PDF). Omsk: ООМИИ имени М. А. Врубеля. ISBN 978-5-8042-0271-3. Archived from the original (PDF) on 3 February 2021.
- В.В. Андреева; М.В. Астафьева; С.Н. Гольдштейн; Н.Л. Приймак, eds. (1982). Товарищество передвижных художественных выставок. Письма, документы. 1869—1899. Moscow: Искусство.
