= Igor Grabar =

Russian painter (1871–1960)

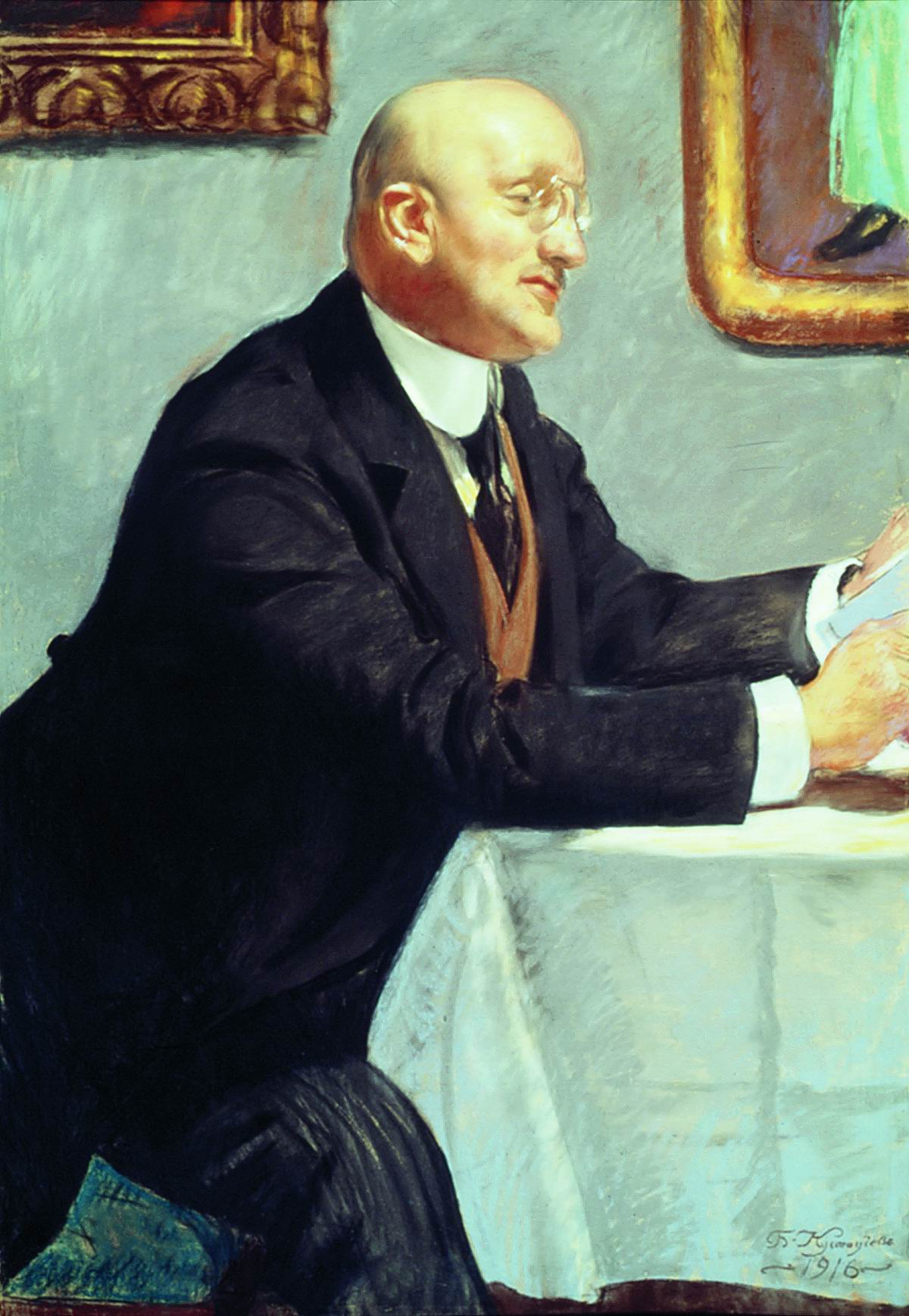
Portrait of Igor Grabar by Boris Kustodiev, 1916

Igor Emmanuilovich Grabar (Russian: И́горь Эммануи́лович Граба́рь, 25 March 1871 – 16 May 1960) was a Russian Post-Impressionist painter, publisher, restorer and historian of art. Grabar, descendant of a wealthy Rusyn family, was trained as a painter by Ilya Repin in Saint Petersburg and by Anton Ažbe in Munich. He reached his peak in painting in 1903–1907 and was notable for a peculiar divisionist painting technique bordering on pointillism and his rendition of snow.

By the end of 1890s, Grabar had established himself as an art critic. In 1902, he joined Mir Iskusstva, although his relations with its leaders Sergei Diaghilev and Mstislav Dobuzhinsky were far from friendly. In 1910–1915, Grabar edited and published his opus magnum, the History of Russian Art. (Note: Years of actual pressings as in Baranovsky and Khlebnikova, p. 105. Grabar started the project in 1908.) The History employed the finest artists and critics of the period; Grabar personally wrote the issues on architecture that set an unsurpassed standard of understanding and presenting the subject. Concurrently, he wrote and published a series of books on contemporary and historic Russian painters. In 1913, he was appointed executive director of the Tretyakov Gallery and launched an ambitious reform program that continued until 1926. Grabar diversified the Tretyakov collection into modern art and in 1917 published its first comprehensive catalogue. In 1921 Grabar became the first professor of Art restoration at the Moscow State University. Grabar helped establish research-based approaches to art restoration in Russia, including examination and documentation before restoration. The Tretyakov Gallery Magazine specifically credits him with introducing pre-restoration examination, photographic documentation, and collaborative decision-making during restoration.

An experienced politician, Grabar stayed at the top of the Soviet art establishment until his death, excluding a brief voluntary retirement in 1933–1937. He managed art-restoration workshops (present-day Grabar Centre) during 1918–1930 and from 1944 to 1960. Grabar took active part in redistribution of former church art nationalized by the Bolsheviks and established new museums for the confiscated treasures. In 1943, he formulated the Soviet doctrine of compensating World War II losses with art looted in Germany. After the war, he personally advised Joseph Stalin on the preservation of architectural heritage.

== Biography ==
=== Family roots ===
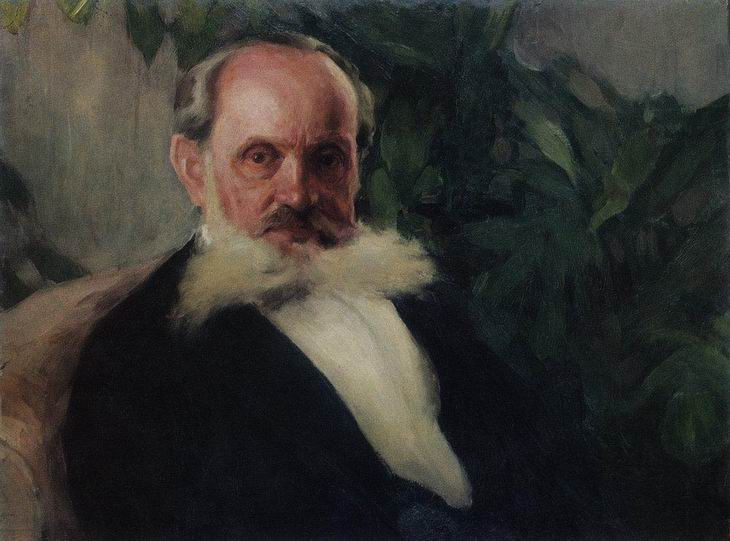
Portrait of Emmanuil Hrabar by Igor Grabar, 1895

Emmanuil Hrabar (1830–1910), father of Igor Grabar and his older brothers Bela (Note: Existence of Bela Hrabar barely attested by a single line in Grabar 2001 chapter 3 page 1.) and Vladimir (the future law scholar, 1865–1956), was an ethnic Rusyn lawyer and a politician of pro-Russian orientation. He was elected to the Hungarian Parliament in 1869, at the same time, maintaining ties with slavophiles in Moscow and the Russian Embassy. Olga Hrabar (1843–1930), mother of Igor and Vladimir, was a daughter of Rusyn pro-Russian, anti-Catholic politician Adolph Dobryansky (1817–1901). According to Igor Grabar's memoirs, Dobryansky ran an underground network of obedient followers. Dobryansky and his group, unaware of the realities of living in the Russian Empire, leaned to its official doctrine of Orthodoxy, Autocracy, and Nationality; Dobryansky, a man of wealth and pedigree, (Note: Grabar provided a description of Dobryansky's assets - seven villages, two manor houses, a spacious park etc. He discussed French and German roots of the Dobryansky family and admitted that any claims to titles were unfounded - Grabar 2001, chapter 1 page 2.) even imitated the lifestyle of a Russian landlord in minute details; two of his sons joined Imperial Russian service. Dobryansky praised the suppression of the Hungarian Revolution of 1848 by Russian troops, dreaded by his own Rusyn peasants. (Note: In 1848 Dobryansky himself took part in suppression of the rising - he was the liaison between the Austrian command and Russian commander-in-chief Ivan Paskevich - Magosci and Pop, p. 94.)

In the early 1870s, the Hungarian government forced Emmanuil Hrabar to leave the country. Olga with children stayed under police surveillance at the Dobryansky manor in Čertižné (now in Slovakia). In 1880, the Hrabars temporarily reunited in Russia. Emmanuil passed a qualification test to teach German and French and settled with Igor and Vladimir in Yegoryevsk. Olga returned to Hungary to continue pro-Russian propaganda; in 1882 she and her father were, at last, arrested for treason and brought to a trial that aroused public suspicion of a police provocation. She was acquitted for lack of evidence and emigrated to Russia for the rest of her life. In Russia, the Hrabars lived under nom de guerre Hrabrov; Igor Grabar restored his real surname (transliterated from Russian with a G, unlike his brother Vladimir Hrabar) in the early 1890s. (Note: According to Grabar, chapter 1 page 1, he changed surname from Hrabrov to Grabar "upon the graduation from the university", i.e. in 1893. The Tretyakov Gallery brief biographical entry on Grabar (in Russian) Archived 16 July 2011 at the Wayback Machine dates this change 1891.)

=== Education ===
Grabar (then Hrabrov) attended high school in Yegoryevsk, where his father taught foreign languages. The stream of magazine publications that followed the 1881 murder of Alexander II of Russia gave him the first impetus to draw. In 1882, the Hrabars (Hrabrovs) relocated to Kiev, closer to the continuing trial of their mother and grandfather; later in the same year, Emmanuil Hrabar accepted an appointment to Izmail. He sent Igor to Mikhail Katkov's boarding school in Moscow; the schoolmaster waived tuition fees for a fellow slavophile. Igor Grabar, interested in drawing, soon made contacts with the students of the Moscow School of Painting, Sculpture and Architecture and already established artists - Abram Arkhipov, Vasily Polenov and the Schukins, wealthy patrons of art. Strapped for cash, he painted portraits of fellow students for a fee.

In 1889, Grabar was admitted to the Law Department of the Saint Petersburg University; he made a living by selling short stories to magazines and soon became the editor of Shut, "the weakest of humour magazines" that nevertheless paid well. His illustrations to books by Nikolay Gogol, signed Igor Hrabrov, inspired the young Aleksandr Gerasimov (born 1881), but Grabar generally stayed aside from drawing. He later complained that tabloid bohemianism completely overwhelmed him. In his second year at the university, Grabar moved up to the respectable Niva magazine. He selected graphics for Niva and wrote essays on contemporary painters but did not yet have enough influence to change its policies. Law-department classes were uninspiring and Grabar spent more time attending history lectures and Pavel Chistyakov's school of painting, but he still managed to graduate in law, without delay, in April 1893.

In the end of 1894, he enrolled in Ilya Repin's class at the Imperial Academy of Arts that had just been radically reformed. (Note: Grabar received his law degree in the very heat of reorganization and preferred to wait a whole year until the Academy settled down - Grabar 2001, chapter 4 page 12.) His classmates, the first "spendid" post-reform group, included Alexej von Jawlensky and Marianne von Werefkin who introduced him to French Impressionism, Konstantin Bogaevsky, Oleksandr Murashko, Nicholas Roerich and Arkady Rylov. Filipp Malyavin, Konstantin Somov, Dmitry Kardovsky also studied alongside Grabar but were admitted earlier. Grabar remained "a fervent admirer" of Repin for life but became quickly dissatisfied with academic studies and in July 1895 left for a brief study tour of Western Europe financed by Niva magazine.

=== Munich ===
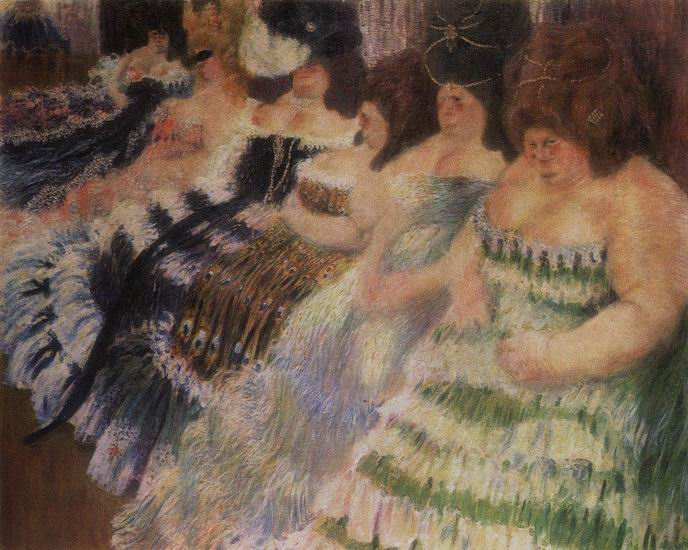
The Fat Women (1904) (Note: According to Grabar, in 1898 prince Shcherbatov invited him to an exclusive party held at some French banker's mansion in Paris. One room there was filled by lavishly dressed fat women sitting shoulder-to-shoulder. The "phalanx of fat, feathers and diamonds", wrote Grabar, was as fascinating as it was disgusting ("было нечто чудовищное, отвратительное, отталкивающее в этой фаланге мяса, пуха и бриллиантов, но было и нечто притягивающее, завлекающее, магическое") and became his favorite subject for a short time. Grabar at first considered his 1904 Fat Women among his best works, but by 1906 he refused to display it in public as substandard despite Diaghilev's pleas - Grabar 2001, chapter 6 page 11.)

His return to Saint Petersburg finally persuaded him to drop out of the Academy; in May 1896, he and Kardovsky left for Munich via Berlin and Paris; Jawlensky and Werefkin joined them later in summer. They enrolled at a private school of painting run by Anton Ažbe. Grabar, who soon became assistant to Ažbe, rated him as "a poorly gifted painter, a superb draftsman and an outstanding teacher". Two years later, when Grabar was ready to leave Ažbe, he was offered an opportunity to open his own, competing, school; Ažbe made a counter-offer, making Grabar his equal partner. The partnership existed for less than a year, from June 1899 until spring of 1900, when Grabar accepted a lucrative offer from Prince Shcherbatov and left Munich. (Note: According to Baranovsky and Khlebnikova, pp. 42-43, dates in Grabar's 1937 Autobiography related to the Shcherbatov-Grabar contract and Ažbe-Grabar partnership are incorrect. Grabar wrote that he left Ažbe in 1899. However, examination of contemporary letters, newspapers and Dobuzhinsky's memoirs indicate that Grabar accepted Ažbe's offer on 1 June 1899 and stayed in Munich until some point in spring of 1900.)

Grabar kept close ties with Saint Petersburg artists and publishers. In January–February 1897, Grabar, obliged to write for Niva, published an article defending avant-garde art against Vladimir Stasov, making a bombshell effect and inadvertently provoking Stasov's campaign against Repin as the dean of the Academy. Another article published in 1899 caused a conflict between Ilya Repin and Mir iskusstva.

Life in Munich also aroused Grabar's interest in architecture, and its history, that soon became his second profession. By 1901, Grabar completed architect's training at the Munich Polytechnicum but did not take the final exams.

=== Mir Iskusstva ===
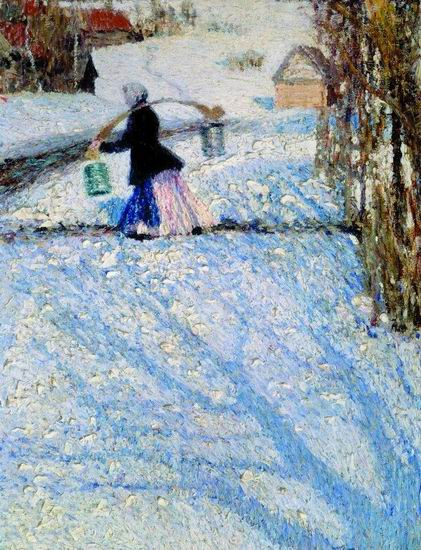
Snow in March, 1904

In 1901–1902, Grabar presented twelve of his paintings at an exhibition hosted by Mir Iskusstva; these were the first "truly French" impressionist works displayed in Russia by a Russian painter. One painting went straight to Tretyakov Gallery, others were auctioned to private collections.

1903–1907 became Grabar's highest point in painting; according to Grabar's Autobiography, the summit (February–April 1904) coincided with the beginning of the Russo-Japanese War. In this season, he practiced moderate divisionism with elements of pointillist technique. Three paintings of this period that Grabar himself considered seminal (February Azure, March Snow and Piles of Snow) garnered wide and generally positive critical response. Kazimir Malevich wrote that, had it not been for linear perspective that Grabar preserved in his March Snow "as a remnant of narrative from the nineteenth century", the whole picture would blend in "a uniform painterly texture" without clearly defined front and middle planes. In 1905, Grabar travelled to Paris to study the new works of French postimpressionists and changed his technique in favor of complete separation of colours. Incidentally, although Grabar appreciated and studied Cézanne, Gauguin and Van Gogh, he himself ranked "the king of painters" Diego Velázquez above them all.

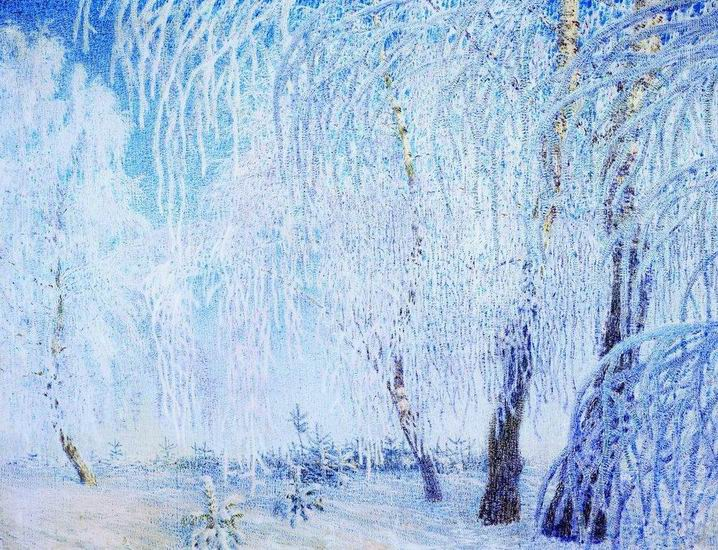
The Frost, end of 1905

At the end of 1905 and the beginning of 1906, when Moscow was burning from riots and shellfire, Grabar tackled another challenging subject, frost, at the same time investing more and more time into writing and editing. Snow, and winter in general, remained his favorite subjects for life.

Relations between Grabar and the founders of Mir Iskusstva were strained. Sergei Diaghilev tolerated Grabar as a business asset but feared and distrusted him as a potential new leader of the movement; Grabar' financial backing provided by Shcherbatov seemed especially menacing. (Note: Grabar completely omitted the subject in his memoirs and presented Grabar-Diaghilev relationships as businesslike but friendly, see for example Grabar 2001, chapter 8 page 11.) Diaghilev's sycophants Nurok and Nouvelle led the opposition, Eugene Lansere and Konstantin Somov followed suit; Valentin Serov was perhaps the only member who treated Grabar with sympathy. Grabar, indeed, used funds of Shcherbatov and Nadezhda von Meck to launch his own short-lived art society that failed to shake Mir Iskusstva and soon fell apart. Memoirs of the period, although biased, indicate that Grabar himself was a difficult person. According to Alexander Benois, Grabar practiced an unacceptably patronizing tone and at the same time, had absolutely no sense of humour. No one questioned his talent and encyclopedic knowledge, but Grabar was unable to persuade people or barely coexist with them in small communities like Mir Iskusstva. As a result, in 1908 Grabar broke with the movement completely and tried, in vain, to launch his own art magazine. (Note: Grabar himself did not mention any conflicts: on the contrary, he wrote that Diaghilev accepted his offer to join the staff. According to Grabar, Pavel Ryabushinsky launched his own well-financed and well-staffed art magazine when the first issue of Grabar's magazine was still in the works. His publisher weighed in the chances of competing with Ryabushinsky and stepped back, cancelling the publication - Grabar 2001, chapter 8 page 12.)

=== Grabar's History ===
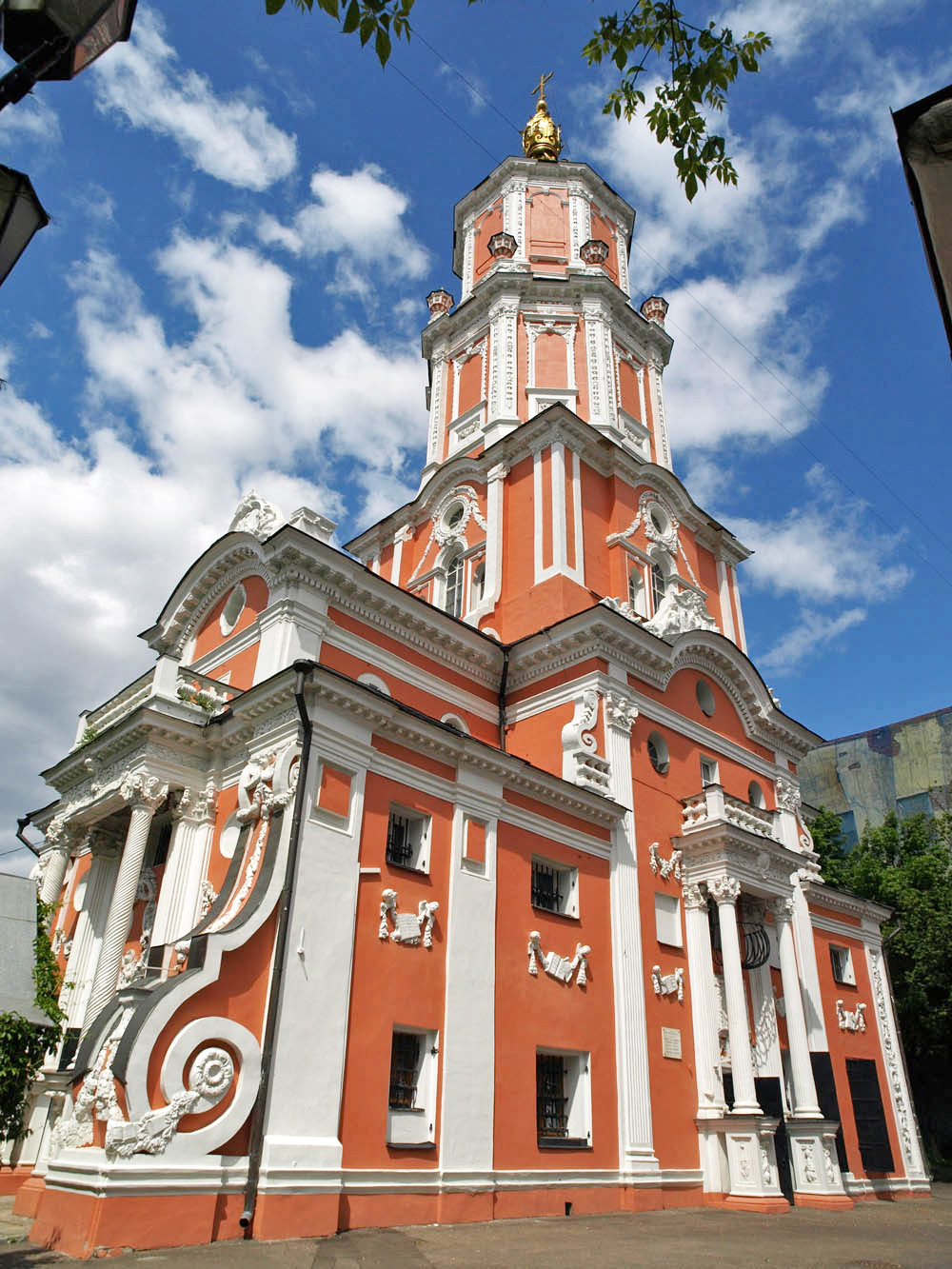
Grabar's periodization of the Menshikov Tower, Moscow's tallest Petrine Baroque building, has been since contested and revised.

In the same 1908, Grabar abandoned painting in favor of writing; he became chief editor and writer for Joseph Knebel's series of books on Russian artists and Russian towns. He quickly amassed a wealth of historic evidence and settled on publishing a comprehensive History of Russian Art. Grabar initially concentrated on project management alone, leaving principal writing to Alexander Benois, (Note: Benois was already renowned as a writer for his 1902 History of painting in Russia. Soon after breakup with Grabar he concentrated on an equally ambitious project, World History of painting. Its fate was similar to Grabar's History - after 22 issues, usually packed into four volumes, edition was terminated by the onset of World War I.) but when the latter stepped aside in May, (Note: According to Grabar, he (based in Moscow) had to manage Benois (based in Petersburg) in writing; Benois resented this management as too repressive ("Эта переписка, видимо, тяготила Бенуа, не любившего никаких ограничений своей творческой инициативы, и он начал отказываться от сотрудничества") - Grabar, Autobiography, chapter 8 page 12. He then cites verbatim a resignation letter by Benois - Grabar 2001, chapter 8 page 13.) Grabar was compelled to pick up the writing task. He now concentrated on architecture; only then did he realize that Russian architecture of the 18th century and earlier periods had never been properly studied. Grabar locked himself in the archives to study the subject for a year; in July 1909 he took a short leave from writing and designed the Palladian Zakharyin Hospital in present-day Khimki, which was completed by the onset of World War I and operates to date. (Note: G. A. Zakharyin memorial hospital (Туберкулезная Клиническая Больница №3 им. Профессора Г.А. Захарьина) operates to date as a suburban tuberculosis clinic.)

The first issue of History was printed in 1910; publication ceased with the 23rd issue in the beginning of 1915 when Knebel's printshop and Grabar's archive stored there were burnt in an anti-German pogrom. Of 2,630 pages in History, 650—the issues on architecture—were written by Grabar. History amalgamated works by the leading architects, artists and critics of the period. Ivan Bilibin, who contributed photography of vernacular architecture, used to say that "we started appreciating old architecture only after Grabar's book." Grabar's own memoirs, however, focus on the failures of his co-authors: of all contributors only Fyodor Gornostayev was commended for doing his part.

Grabar's predecessors did not elaborate how art, and especially architecture fitted "into the grand historical scheme"; his History became the first comprehensive work that attempted to solve the task. Grabar, accepting now-standard periodization of Russian history, applied the same scheme to history of architecture and emphasized the role of individual monarchs in it. His view of the transition from Naryshkin Baroque, the summit of Muscovite architecture, into loaned European Petrine Baroque as an organic process, however, was contentious from the start, and, according to James Cracraft, could not account for an abrupt demise of national architecture under Peter I and his successors. His own concept of "Moscow Baroque", probably influenced by Heinrich Wölfflin, is "not entirely consistent or clear". Soviet historians retained Grabar's overall scheme, sealing the "persistent lack of a clear and consistent, architecturally configured periodization of Russian architectural history.". Grabar's concept of Moscow Baroque was challenged, (Note: See Cracraft 1988, pp. 87-92, for a review of the evolution of Russian Baroque concept in the Soviet Union.) his Ukrainian Baroque was trashed, yet Belarusian Baroque became "a fixture of Soviet scholarship."

Grabar's understanding of lesser phenomena has been, at times, erroneous and his attributions were later dismissed. For example, he based the description of the 1591 Ambassadors' Prikaz building on a "fanciful and grossly distorted" sketch by a Swede who visited Moscow after the building was torn down and replaced with a new one. His attribution and periodization of Menshikov Tower is also challenged. Nevertheless, James Cracraft ranked Grabar the first "in the whole field of Russian art history", Dmitry Shvidkovsky wrote that Grabar's History in whole "remains unsurpassed", and William Craft Brumfield noted its "immense importance" for the preservation of medieval heritage.

=== Tretyakov Gallery ===
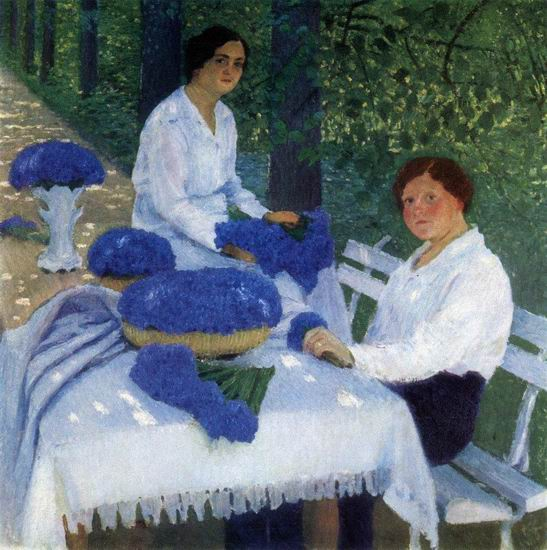
Grabar's wife, her sister and cornflowers, 1914

On 2 April 1913, the Board of the Tretyakov Gallery elected Grabar its trustee and executive director. He accepted the appointment on condition that the trustees give him unlimited authority in reforming the gallery. Later, he wrote that had he known the weight of this burden beforehand he would step back, but, inexperienced in public politics, he grabbed the opportunity of "being there", among the subject of his History. Grabar planned to expand the former private collection into a comprehensive showcase of national art, including the controversial Russian and French modernist paintings. He laid out a program of artistic, scientific, educational-enlightening and social changes and eventually converted the gallery into a European museum.

Grabar started with rearranging the paintings in public display; when the gallery reopened in December 1913, the main enfilade of its second floor was prominently terminated with Vasily Surikov's epic Feodosia Morozova. The first floor was now filled with completely new material - contemporary French painters and young Russians like Kuzma Petrov-Vodkin and Martiros Saryan. In the beginning of 1915, Grabar's purchasing decisions stirred a public scandal that involved practically all publicly known artists; Victor Vasnetsov, Mikhail Nesterov, Vladimir Makovsky and Grabar's former sponsor Shcherbatov called for immediate termination of his tenure. (Note: According to Grabar, investigation into his "freewheeling" purchasing was launched by Shcherbatov, another trustee, who was appalled that Grabar purchased a painting by Isaac Levitan, the last one he created, without the Board's consent. Shcherbatov was joined by the former executive director of the gallery Ilya Ostroukhov and recruited supporters from the political heavyweights of the Guchkov family. Grabar's memoirs don't elaborate further on fellow painters' participation in the debate. - Grabar 2001, chapter 9 page 13.) Debates continued until January 1916, when Moscow City Hall approved Grabar's reform in full. Grabar summarized his achievements in the 1917 catalogue of the Gallery, the first of its kind.

The Russian Revolution of 1917 had dual effect on the gallery. Collapse of the monetary system and city utilities brought the gallery to a "really catastrophic condition" that was barely improved by nationalization in June 1918. At the same time the gallery collection rapidly grew, absorbing nationalized private and church collections and formerly independent small museums. (Note: Grabar wrote of the 1922 campaign of organized confiscating in churches: "In 1922-1923 the museums acquired more artifacts of applied art than in many decades preceding the Revolution" ("Музеи в течение 1922–1923 годов обогатились предметами прикладного декоративного искусства так, как не обогащались в течение десятилетий до революции.") - Grabar 2001, chapter 9 page 15.) One by one its own exhibition halls were converted into art warehouses and closed to the public. From 1918-1930, and again in 1944-1960, Grabar created and hosted Central Restoration Workshops in Moscow, now known as the Igor Grabar All-Russian Research and Restoration Centre. These restoration workshops ignited science-based art conservation in Russia. These organizations became an important center for the systematic restoration of Russian icons and other historic artworks. From 1918–1934, the workshop reportedly restored more than 1,000 artifacts, including icons and frescoes. By 1924, the gallery operated four affiliate halls, in 1925 it disposed with foreign masters, but these measures could not offset the inflow of new stock. Physical expansion of the building became a first priority, and in 1926 Grabar was replaced with architect Aleksey Shchusev.

=== Thriving under the Bolsheviks ===
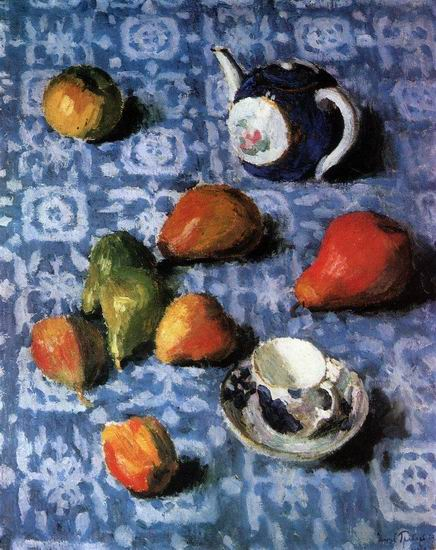
Pears on Blue, 1915

In 1918, Grabar took the lead of the Museums and Preservation Section of the Soviet Government, the Museum Fund and the Moscow-based state restoration workshops, becoming de facto chief curator of arts and architectural heritage for the whole Moscow region. As prescribed by the Bolsheviks in December 1918, Grabar's institutions catalogued all known heritage, "an action tantamount to confiscation", and despite continuing war many nationalized landmarks were actually restored. Grabar's group, like the contemporary Gorky Commission, was torn by a conflict of preservationists (Grabar, Alexander Benois, Alexander Chayanov, Pyotr Baranovsky) and "destroyers" (David Shterenberg, Vladimir Tatlin) and Grabar later complained that he had to offset two extremes, destruction of heritage and obstruction of avant-garde artists (he was himself the "main exponent of conservation"). Grabar successfully exploited whatever allies he could recruit amongst the ambivalent Soviet bureaucracy, starting with the Commissar for Education Anatoly Lunacharsky, and even managed to retain his affluent lifestyle of the past. Following the Bolshevik Revolution, Grabar was on the State Collegium for Museums and Protection of Art and Antiquities, where he organized expeditions to historic cities to locate and scientifically document Russian icons.

From 1919, Grabar directed his commission into documenting and preserving Orthodox church murals and icons. The first 1919 expedition to Yaroslavl located and restored previously unknown works of the 12th and 13th centuries. Restorers Fyodor Modorov, Grigory Chirikov and photographer A. V. Lyadov continued studies of northern church art throughout the 1920s and by 1926 produced the first comprehensive study of icons and an assessment of wooden churches that housed them. Grabar's icon restoration workshop became internationally known; Alfred H. Barr, Jr. who visited Moscow in 1927–1928, wrote of Grabar's technology "with great enthusiasm". "It is to Grabar, more than to any other single scholar, that Russia owes the rediscovery of his icons."

These appointments inevitably placed Grabar near the top of the Soviet machine of confiscating church and, to a lesser extent, privately held art treasures. Benois, who left the country, scorned Grabar for "ripping Princess Mescherskaya of her Botticelli." Grabar accepted the fact of Bolshevik expropriation and concentrated on preservation of the treasures and setting up local museums to display them in public. His and Roman Klein's (Note: Architect Roman Klein, the builder and trustee of the Pushkin Museum, was elected trustee of Tretyakov Gallery in 1913, along with Grabar, and supported his reforms during the debates of 1913–1915. Earlier, in 1909, Grabar and Klein produced independent architectural designs for the Zakharyin Hospital; according to Grabar's memoirs, Klein's draft turned out "too ordinary" and was rejected by the client ("представленный им проект оказался настолько ординарным, что от осуществления его решительно отказались") - Grabar 2001, chapter 8 page 16).) proposal to convert the whole Moscow Kremlin into a public museum failed, and the Kremlin was quickly taken over by the sprawling Red government. Among the masterpieces found during these campaigns was The Madonna of Tagil (Madonna del Popolo) taken from the Demidov house and attributed by Grabar to Raphael. Most, however, ended up at overseas auctions. Less formal attempts of individual artists to raise money in the United States failed: the 1924 show in New York City attracted 17 thousand visitors but raised only $30,000 and Grabar admitted "We do not know what to do".

=== 1930s ===
Lenin at the direct line, 1933.

In 1930, Grabar left all his administrative, academic and editorial jobs, even that of an editor of the Great Soviet Encyclopedia, and concentrated on painting. (Note: According to Grabar, withdrawal was more or less gradual and spanned four or five years, starting from his dismissal from the helm of the Tretyakov Gallery - Grabar 2001, chapter 9 page 16.) Grabar himself wrote: "I had to choose between the daily mounting administrative burden and creating ... I had no choice. A personal pension granted by Sovnarkom hastened my retirement." According to Baranovsky and Khlebnikova, the decision was influenced by his mother's death; Grabar the artist shifted his attention to problems of age, aging and death. According to Colton, the change followed a campaign of demolition inside the Kremlin (Chudov Monastery) and all over Moscow. The preservationist Old Moscow Society, unable to influence the authorities any longer, voted itself out of existence, and Grabar's heritage commission was disbanded a few months later. Grabar's influence over impending demolitions was now reduced to writing pleas to Stalin, as was the case of the Sukharev Tower in 1933–1934.

Grabar supervised another New York exhibition, this time of icon art, in 1931 and painted a string of official "socialist realism epics" but it was the 1933 Portrait of Svetlana that gave him an enormous and unwanted exposure at home and abroad. Grabar himself rated this portrait, painted in one day, among its best. The public identified its title subject as none other than Stalin's daughter (born in 1926, she could not have been Grabar's subject; the legend persisted into the 1960s). Either this dangerous publicity, or his earlier association with Natalia Sedova and other trotskyists compelled Grabar to retire to relative obscurity. He kept on painting and wrote his Autobiography that was ready for print in June 1935 but was barred from publication until March 1937. Contrary to the communist policy, Autobiography appreciated the "formalist" art of Mir Iskusstva and dismissed "some critics applying Marxist analysis" as utterly incompetent. In the same 1937 Grabar published Ilya Repin that earned him the State Prize four years later and began writing Serov. By 1940, he was firmly back into the Soviet establishment and was featured in propagandist newsreels produced for distribution in Nazi Germany.

=== World War II and beyond ===
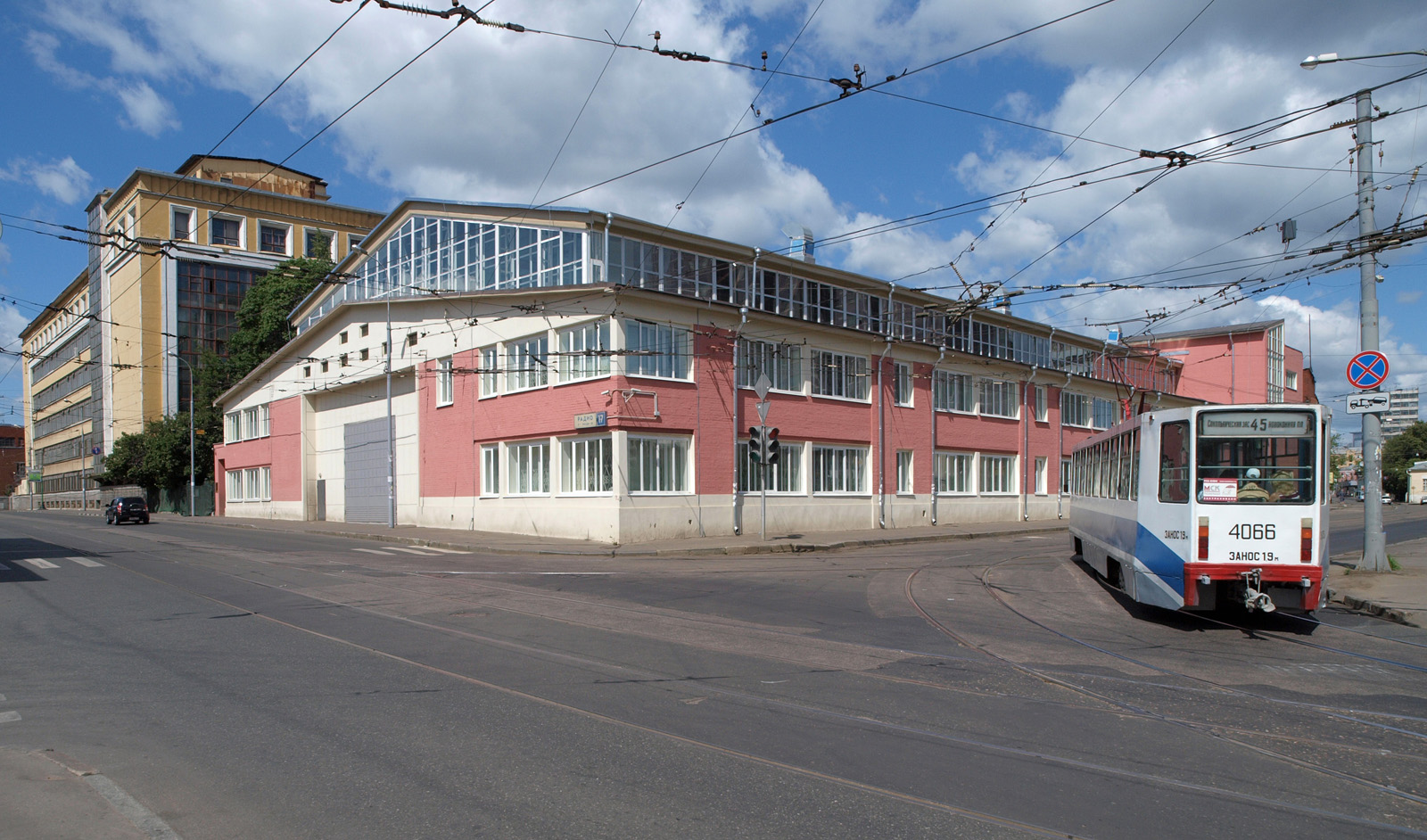
Present-day Grabar Institute workshops in Moscow.

In June 1943, Grabar proposed tit-for-tat compensation of Soviet art treasures destroyed in World War II with art to be taken from Germany. Compiling the target list of German treasures was easy, but estimating own losses was not: by March 1946, only nine out of forty major museums could provide an inventory of their losses. The government used Grabar's proposal as a smoke screen: while Grabar's deputy Victor Lazarev was discussing the legality of equitable reparations with the Allies, Soviet "trophy brigades" had practically completed a wholesale campaign of organized looting.

Grabar consulted Joseph Stalin in preparation to Moscow's 800-years jubilee celebrated in 1947. He persuaded Stalin to return the former St. Andronik Monastery, once converted to a prison, if not to the church but to the artistic community. The remains of the monastery, restored by Pyotr Baranovsky, became the Andrey Rublyov Museum of Old Russian Art (Grabar upheld Baranovsky's dubious "discovery" of the alleged tomb of Andrey Rublyov). Grabar, as the senior in artistic community, retained some independence from the ideological pressure, as indicated by his 1945 obituary for the emigre Leonid Pasternak printed in Soviet Art.

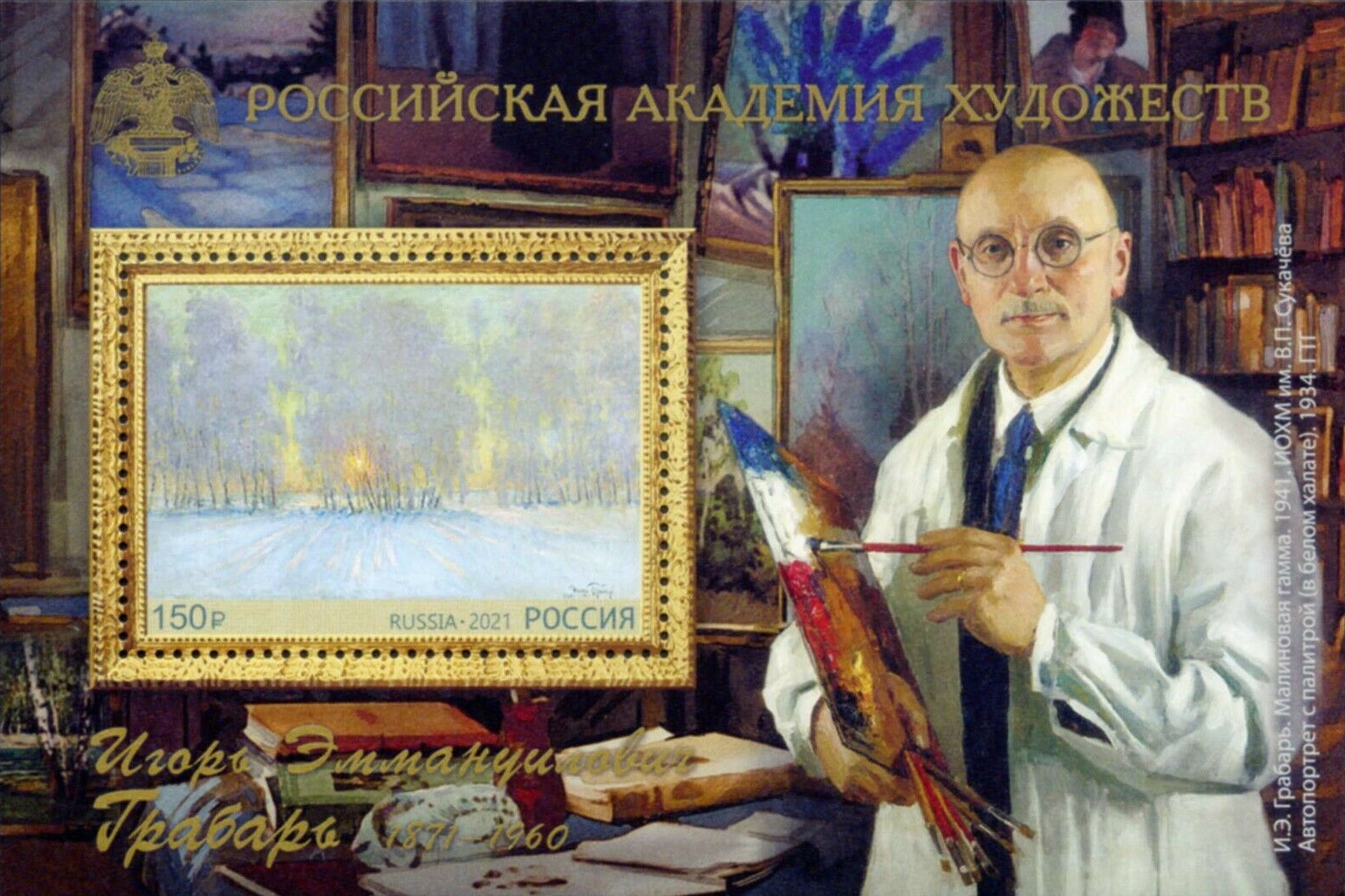
A 2021 stamp sheet of Russia featuring a 1934 self-portrait of Grabar and his paintings

Things weren't always smooth: in 1948 Grabar was caught in another campaign against random targets in art and science. He retained his administrative and university jobs and in 1954 co-authored Russian architecture of the first half of the 18th century, a revisionist study of the period that dismissed the knowledge collected by fellow historians before 1917. He made an exception, though, for his own works that allegedly "correctly understood" the subject. Contrary to Grabar's own understanding of East-West cultural relationship presented in History but in line with the rules of Soviet historiography, the new book claimed that Russians of the 18th century "yield nothing in their work to foreign contemporaries" and overstated the influence of folk tradition on polite architecture. These falsified theories, easily dismissed today, established the "provincial outlook" that governed the post-war generation of Soviet art historians.

After Stalin's death, Grabar was the first to publicly denounce run-of-the-mill socialist realism and pay the dues to once banished Aristarkh Lentulov and Pyotr Konchalovsky. The "unsinkable" Grabar earned derogatory nicknames Ugor Obmanuilovich ("cheating eel") and Irod Graber ("Herod the Robber"). Baranovsky and Khlebnikova noted that the reaction against Grabar was frequently provoked by his work at the helm of museum purchasing committees: mediocre artists inevitably had a grudge against his buying and pricing decisions.
