= Stanislav Zhukovsky =

Polish-Russian painter (1873–1944)

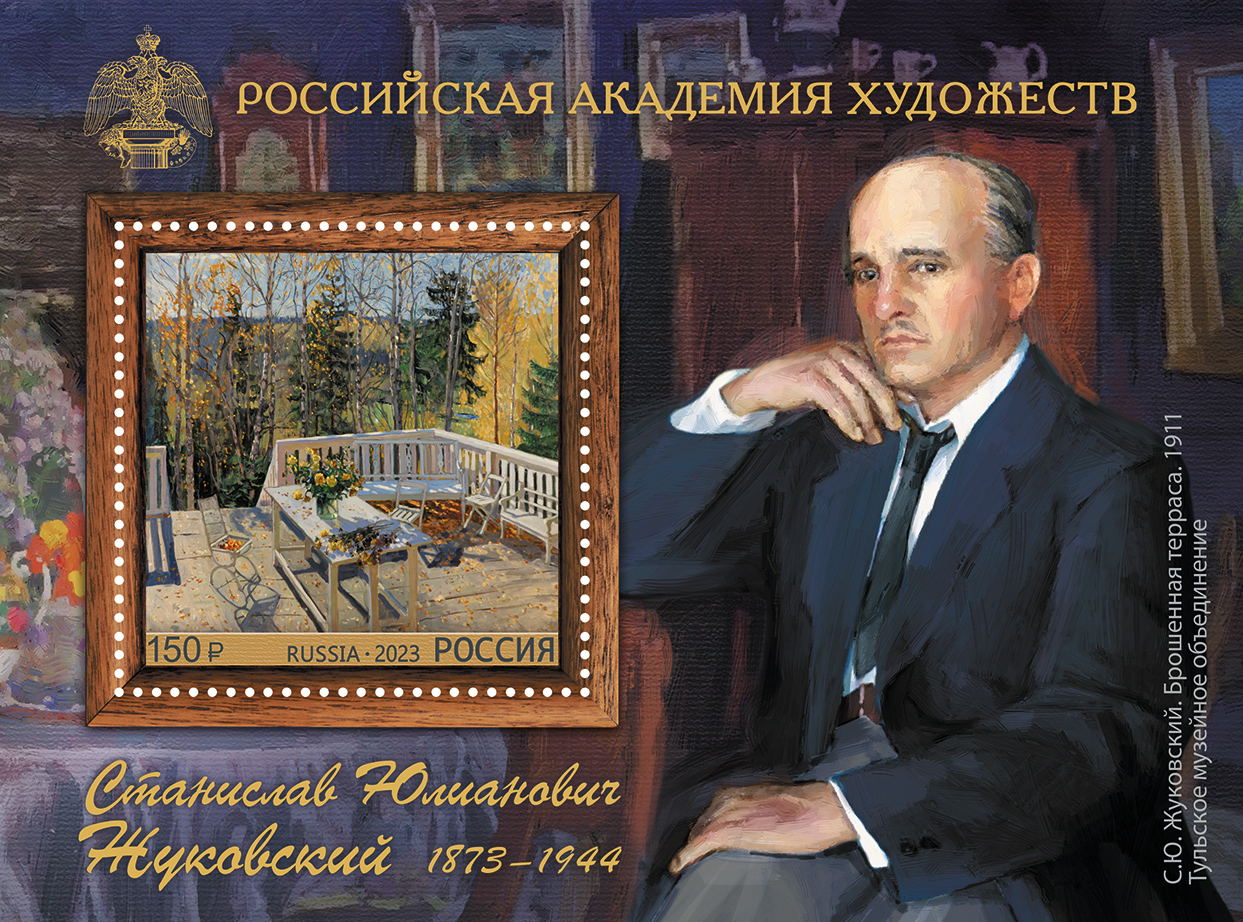
Zhukovsky and his 1911 work Abandoned terrace on a 2023 stamp sheet of Russia

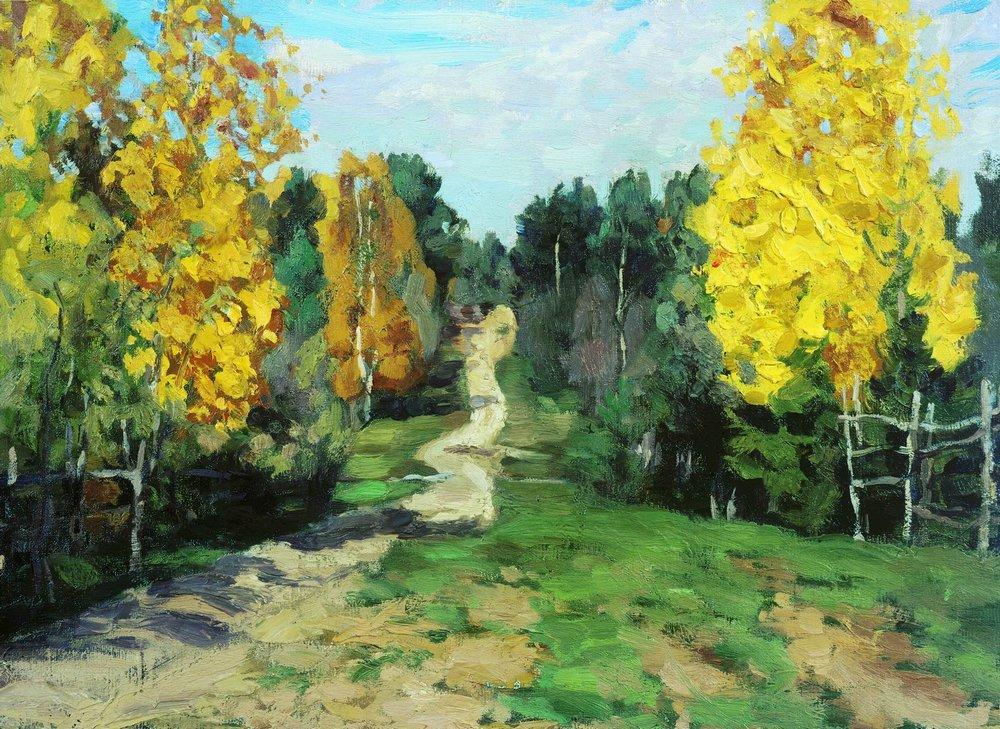
Autumn road (1912).

Stanislav Yulianovich Zhukovsky (Polish: Stanisław Żukowski, Russian: Станислав Юлианович Жуковский; 1873–1944) was a Polish-Russian painter, and a member of Mir iskusstva.

== Life ==
Zhukovsky was born in Yendrikhovtsy (Jędrzychowice), Grodno Province. He was a student of Isaac Levitan and a graduate of the Moscow School of Painting. Zhukovsky became a celebrated landscapist working in a unique style which projected impressionistic methods and skills as well as his interpretation of the tradition of the Russian realist school. He established his own art studio in Moscow where he mentored students, including later to become a celebrated avantgardist Liubov Popova and a young Vladimir Mayakovsky who was then working as a poster artist.

As a painter, Zhukovsky left a legacy from capturing Russian landscapes and pre-revolutionary sites and the interior of Russian estate houses. His social predisposition left him skeptical of the Bolshevik revolution, and in 1923 he left Soviet Union for his ancestral homeland Poland, then already an independent country.

After the German occupation of Poland during World War II, he was arrested by the Nazis and held at the prisoner transit camp (Durchgangslager) at Pruszków, where he eventually died in 1944.

== Gallery ==
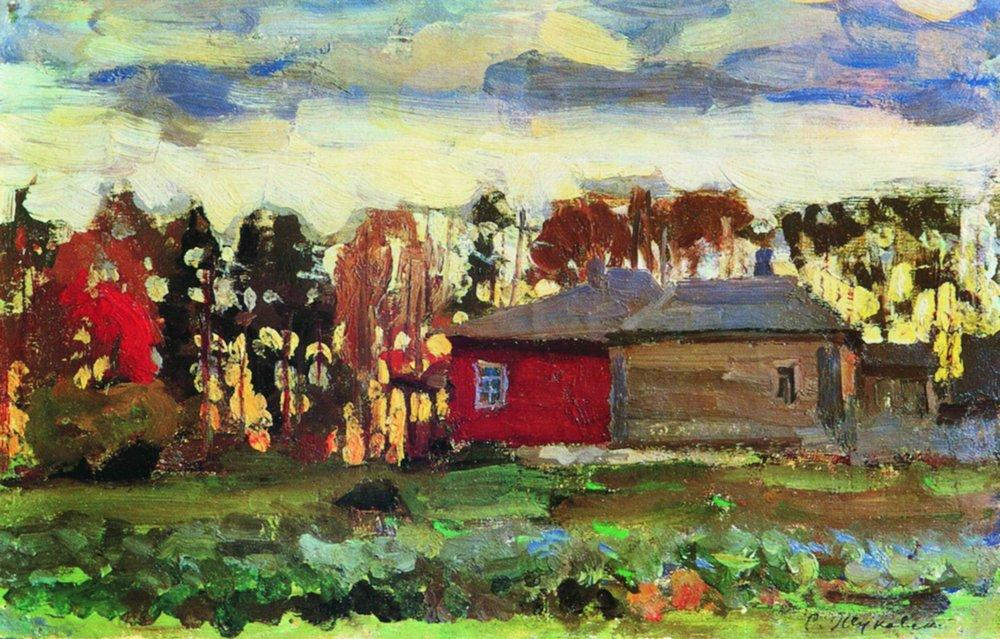
Autumn evening (1905)

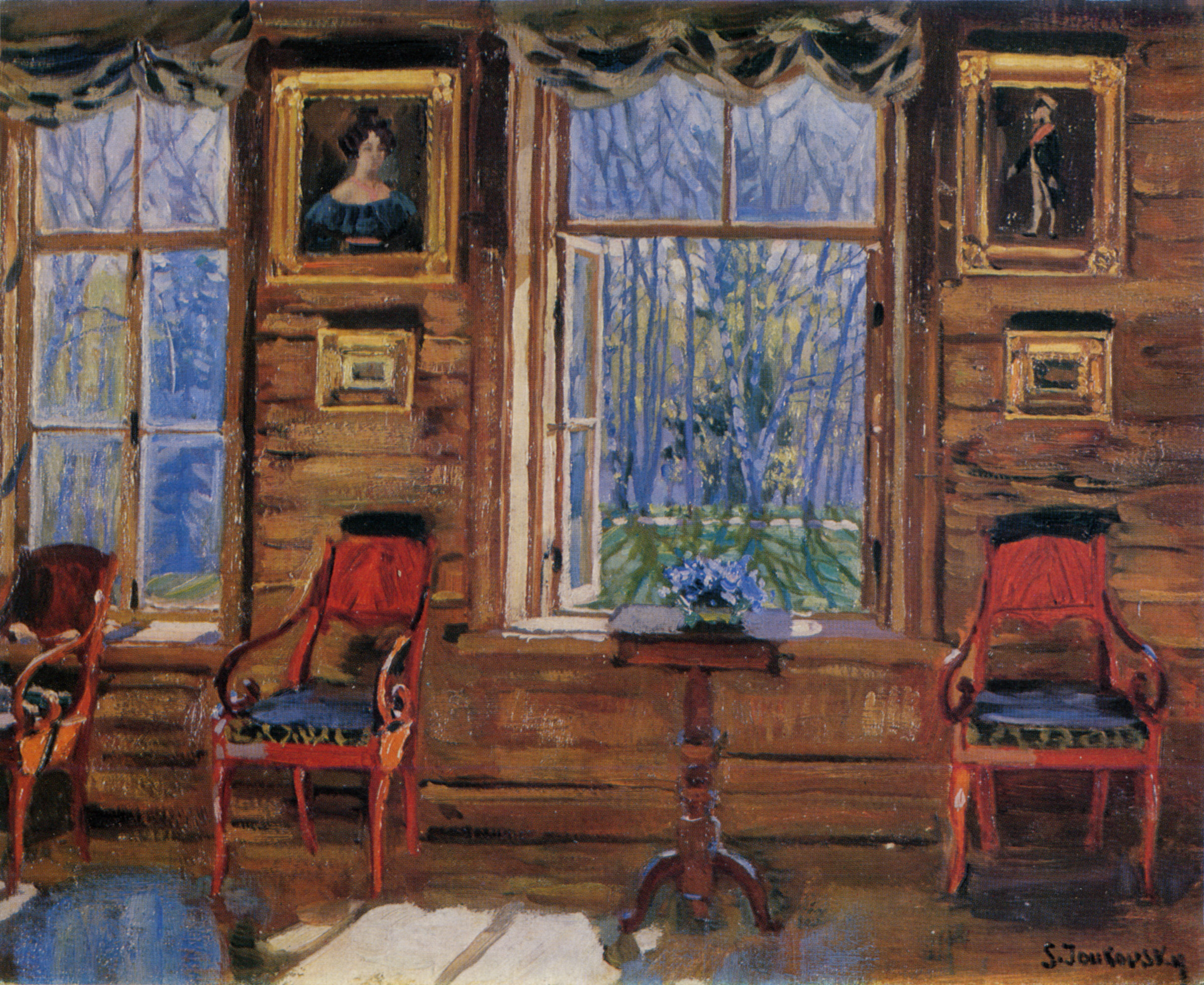
Joyful May (1912)

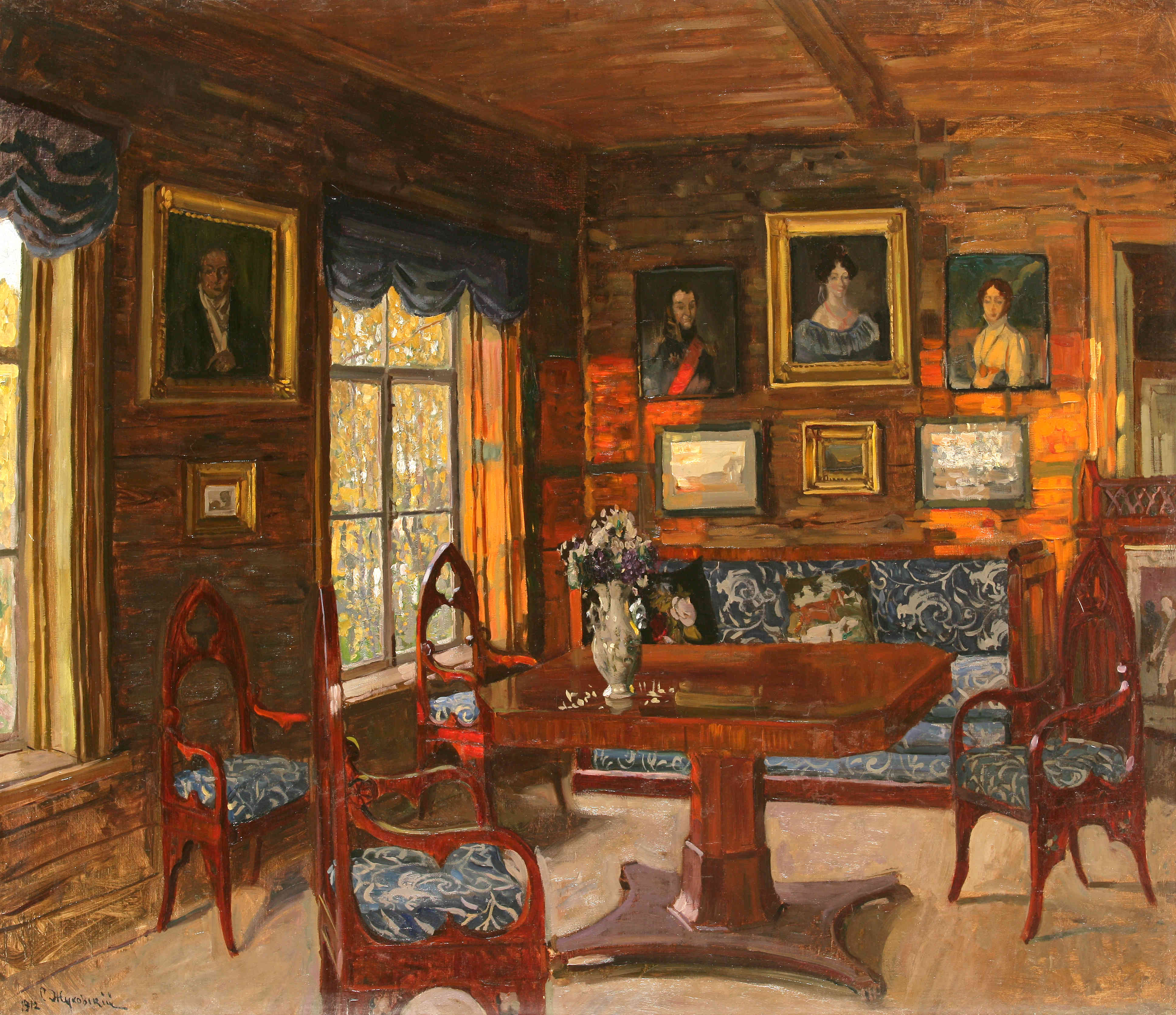
The past. Room in an old house (1912)

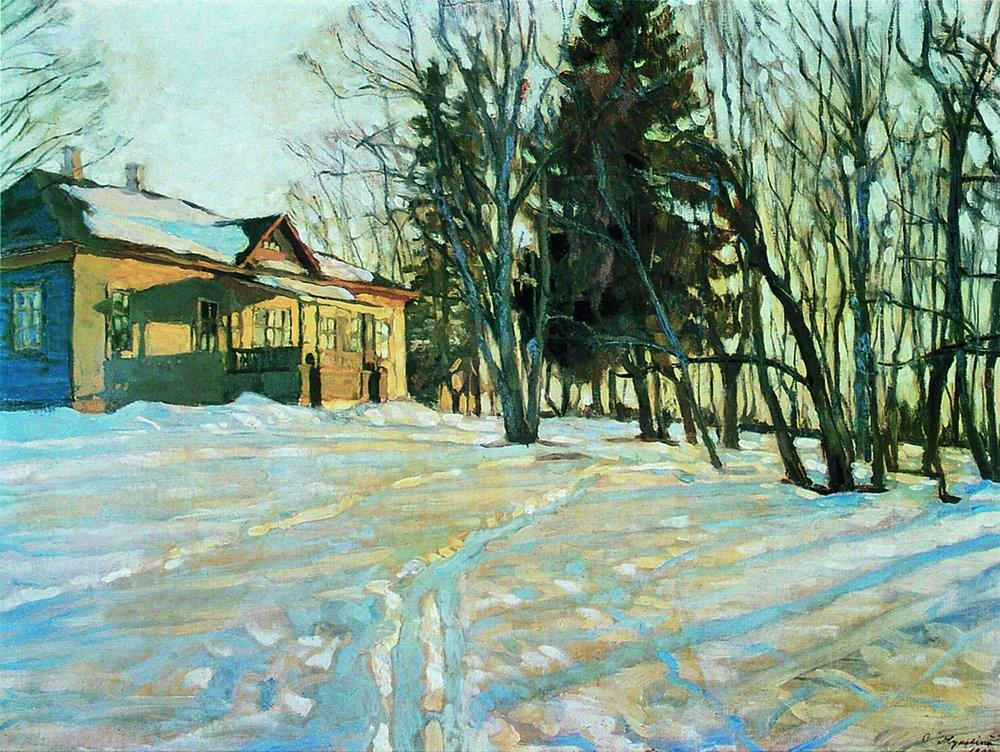
March evening (1912)
