= February Azure =

1904 landscape painting by Igor Grabar

- Февральская лазурь (Russian)
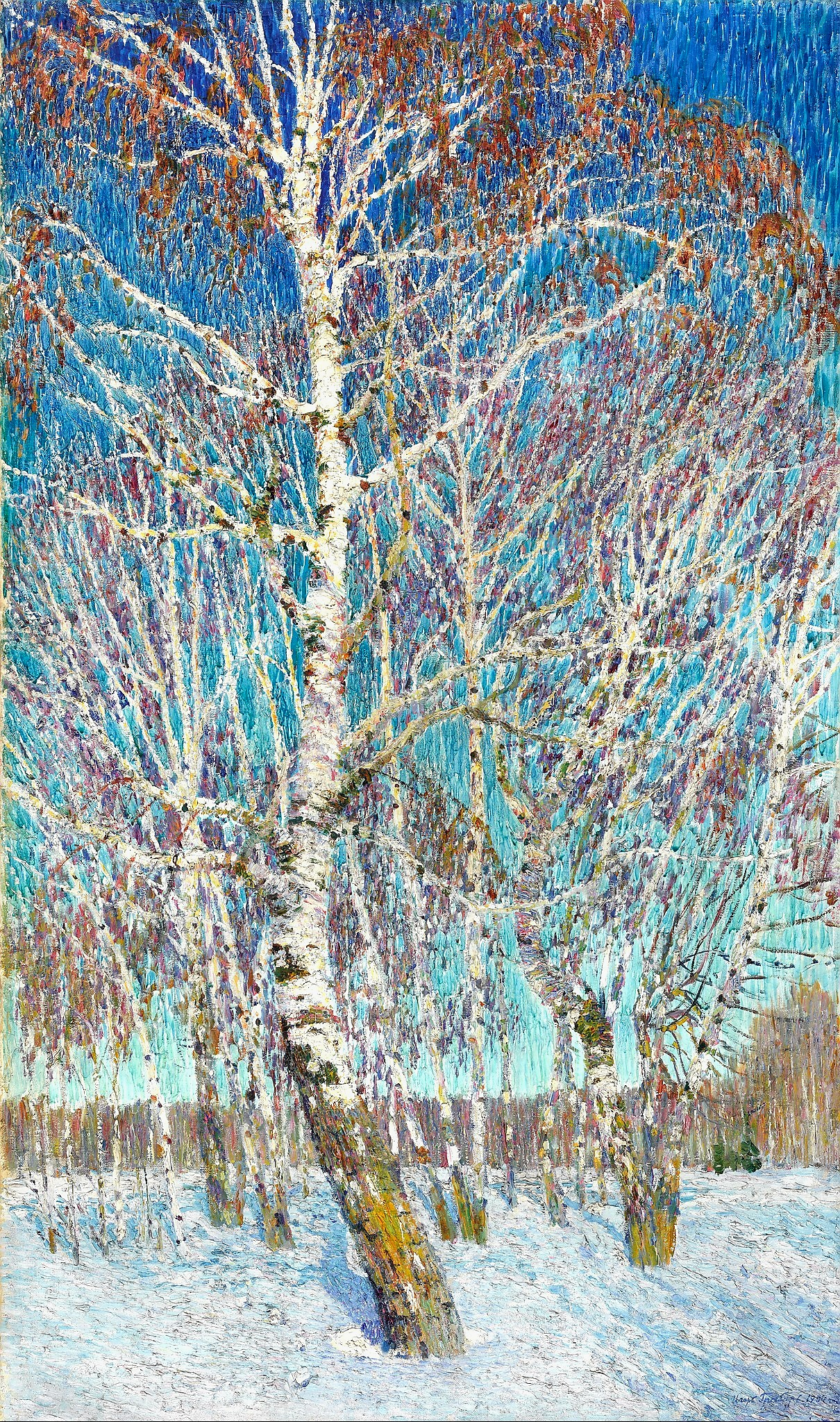
- Artist: Igor Grabar
- Year: 1904
- Medium: Oil on canvas
- Dimensions: 142.6 cm × 84.8 cm (56.1 in × 33.4 in)
- Location: Tretyakov Gallery, Moscow
- Owner: Tretyakov Gallery

February Azure (Russian: Февральская лазурь, romanized: Fevral'skaya lazur'), also known as February Blue, is a landscape painting by Russian Post-Impressionist painter Igor Grabar. Having been inspired by wintry scenery with vibrant and diverse colours near the Pakhra river in Moscow in February 1904, Grabar completed the painting after working for two consecutive weeks in situ under an umbrella, in a trench he had dug in the snow.

February Azure was presented to the public at the second exhibition of the Union of Russian Artists which opened in Saint Petersburg in 1904. The Tretyakov Gallery in Moscow purchased the painting from Grabar in 1905 after a unanimous decision of the museum's board of directors. Grabar considered February Azure a sum of several separate, lengthy observations—in a sense, a synthesis of them—and a revolutionary work that opened up a path Russian art had not explored until then.

== Studies and background ==
At the first exhibition of the Union of Russian Artists in 1903, Grabar became acquainted with one of the participating artists, Nikolai Meshcherin. Meshcherin invited Grabar to stay at his family estate on the bank of the Pakhra river in Moscow. Grabar, eager to paint snow and winter landscapes, accepted the invitation; he regarded snow as an ideal surface for exploring a wide range of lighting effects in painting. The affluent Meshcherin family, owners of the Danilovskaya factory, were hospitable and made Grabar feel at home, providing him with a sleigh and carriage to facilitate his studies in the surrounding area. During one of his regular excursions near the estate in February 1904, he allegedly encountered "something extraordinary going on in nature. [...] a feast of azure skies, pearl birches, coral twigs, and sapphire shadows on the lilac snow". The scene left a profound impression on him and inspired the creation of a painting to capture its effect.

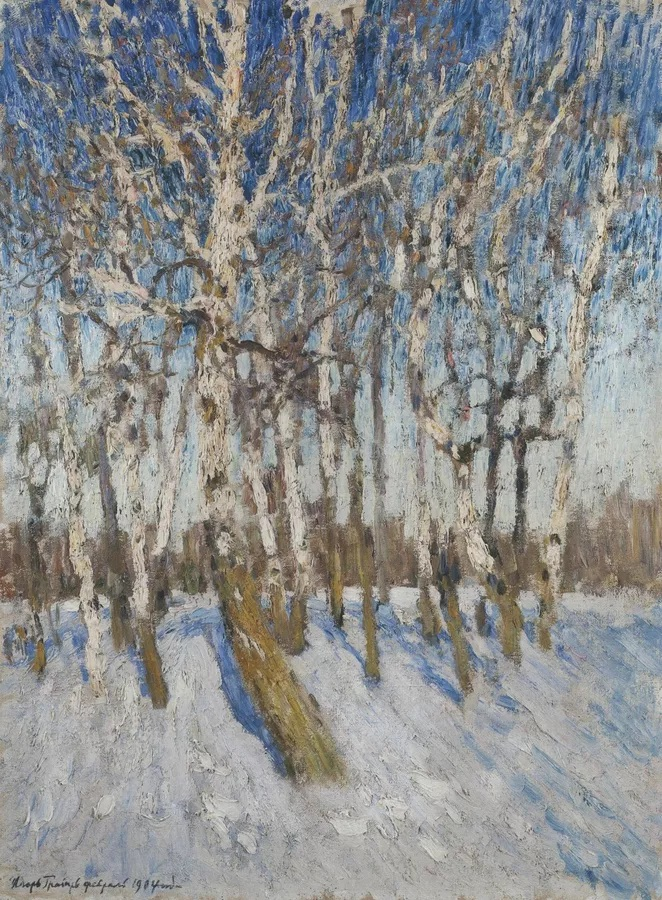
Winter, preparatory study, 75.2 cm × 55 cm (29.6 in x 22 in)

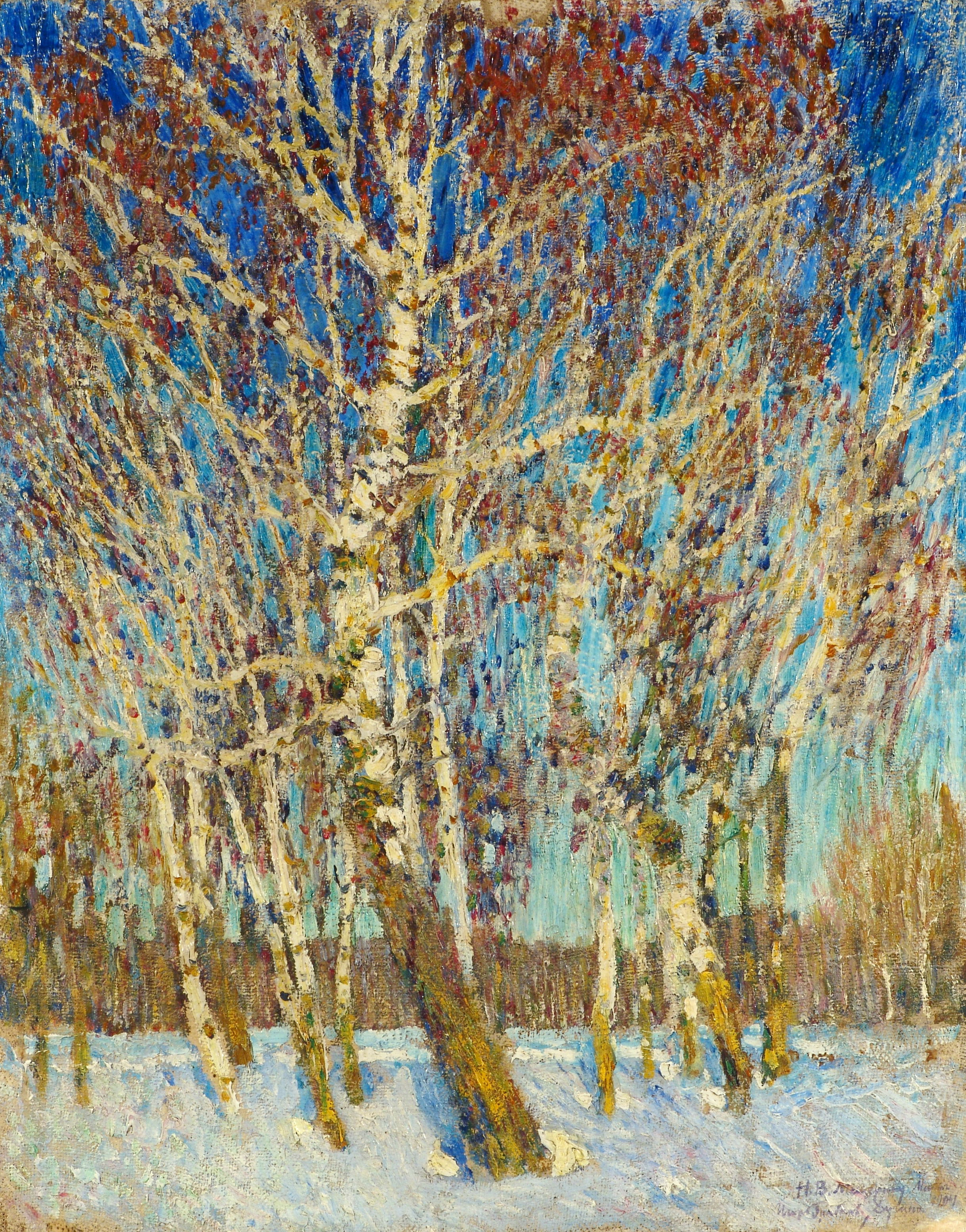
February Azure, preparatory study, 90 cm × 72 cm (35 in × 28 in)

Grabar first painted a study on a small canvas, then took a larger canvas and worked on another study for the next three days on the same spot. Both studies survived: the first one, titled Winter, is stored in the collection of the State Russian Museum under the inventory number Ж-2219 in Saint Petersburg, and the second, titled February Azure, is kept in the National Art Museum of Belarus in Minsk.

Grabar subsequently dug a trench more than one metre (3.3 ft) deep in the snow, in which he settled down with an easel and a canvas mounted on it so he could get an impression of "a low horizon and the celestial zenith, with all the gradations of blue from light-green below to ultramarine at the top". He had prepared the canvas beforehand in the studio, covering it with a dense layer of lead white in varying tones. The daily work lasted for two weeks, uninterrupted and entirely in situ. Grabar later recalled that, fortunately for him, the snow remained unmelted throughout this period due to persistently cold weather. He worked under an umbrella, positioning the canvas with its front side facing the sky so that reflected sunlight from the snow would not alter his perception of the colours.

== Descriptions and reception ==
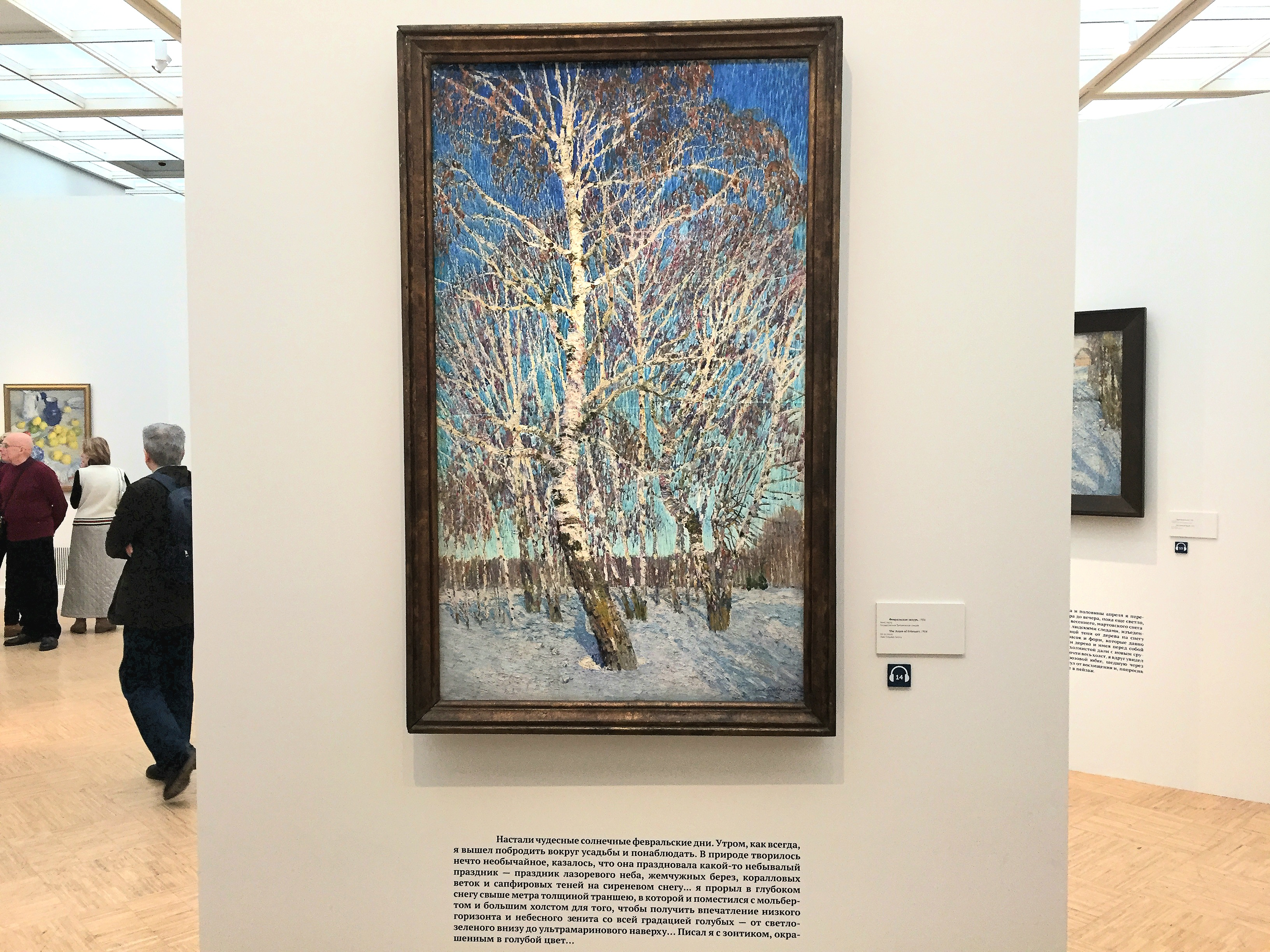
February Azure was among the exhibits at the 150th anniversary exhibition of Grabar's birth in the Tretyakov Gallery.

The title effectively captures the essence of the composition, which depicts the vivid colours of the sky on a cold February day. Most of the painting's foreground is occupied by a birch tree with branches that are, according to art historian Olga Podobedova, "rhythmically arranged (ритмически расположенными)" and shining either white or golden against the sky background. Grabar himself noted their rhythmic structure in his Automonograph. The top of the tree cannot be seen as it is cut off by the upper edge of the canvas. Art historian Natalia Mamontova compared the branches to "wings" and observed that the red crowns of the trees are genuinely impressionistic, whilst the painting's vertical format (142.6 cm × 84.8 cm or 56.1 in × 33.4 in) heightens the plasticity of the birch and gives prominence to "the infinity of the azure space (бесконечность лазурного пространства)". Behind are other, thinner birches, and on the horizon is a birch forest streaked with light in some distance. The snow in the foreground shows the shadows of the trees behind the viewer.

The painting was presented to the public at the second exhibition of the Union of Russian Artists, which opened on 31 December 1904 in Saint Petersburg and then moved to Moscow in February 1905. In 1905, February Azure was purchased from Grabar by the Tretyakov Gallery in Moscow after a unanimous decision of the museum's board of directors. Grabar wrote in his Automonograph that, although March Snow (Мартовский снег, 1904) seemed more popular among other artists than any other work he produced during his early years, he felt that February Azure was more significant and integral because it was a sum of several different, lengthy observations and, in a sense, a synthesis of them. He believed that February Azure opened up a path Russian art had not explored until then.

== See also ==
- Mir iskusstva – Early 20th-century Russian art movement with magazine of the same name
