= Znamenskaya Church (Dubrovitsy) =

Church in Dubrovitsy, Moscow Oblast, Russia

Znamenskaya Church Russian: Церковь Зна́мения Пресвятой Богоро́дицы в Дубровицах
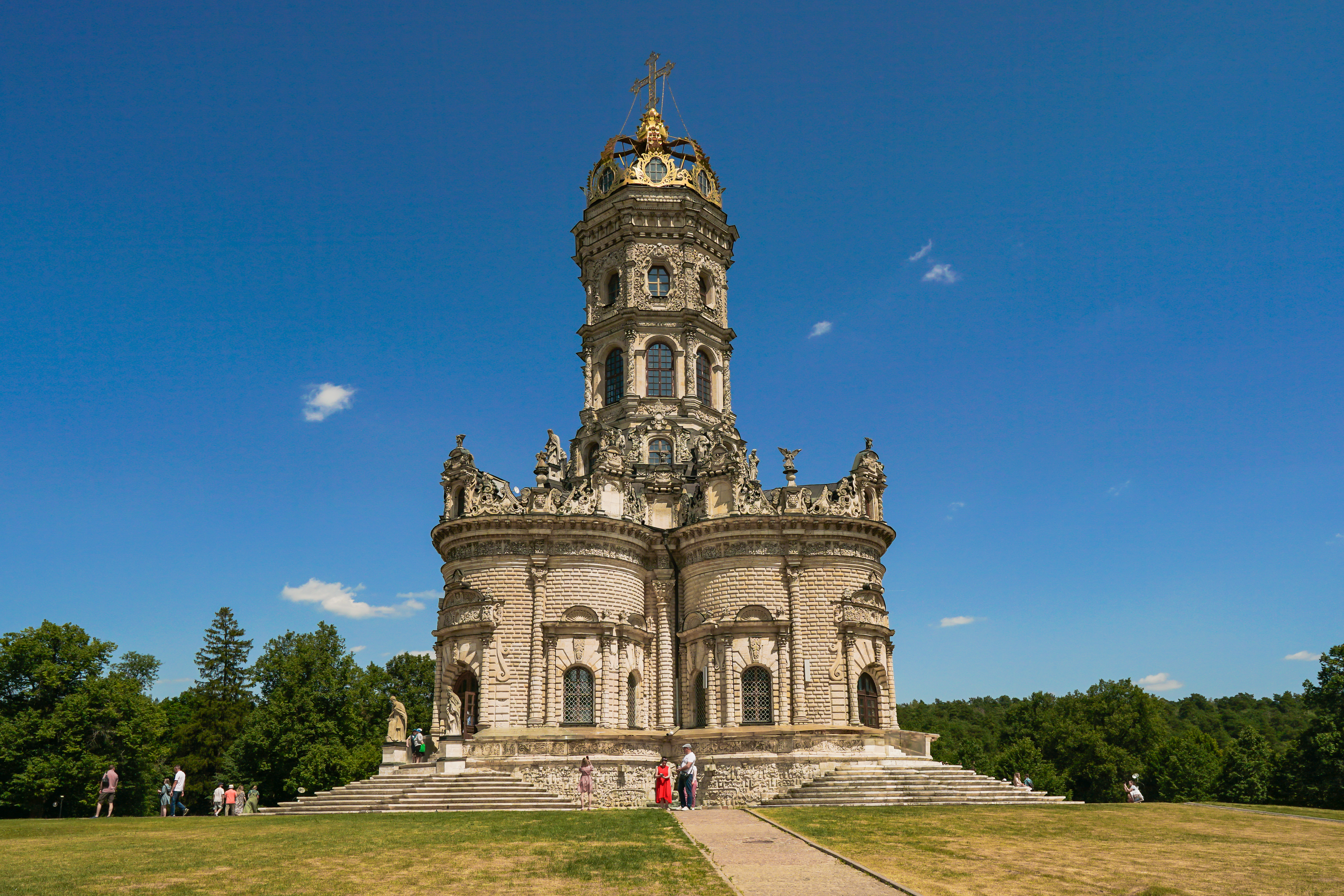
- View from the south

Religion
- Affiliation: Russian Orthodox Church
- Province: Moscow Metropolitanate
- Region: Podolsk Diocese
- Year consecrated: 1704
- Status: Active

Location
- Location: Dubrovitsy vil.
- Municipality: Podolsk Urban Okrug
- State: Russia
- Interactive map of Znamenskaya Church; Russian: Церковь Зна́мения Пресвятой Богоро́дицы в Дубровицах
- Territory: Moscow Oblast
- Coordinates: 55°26′28.67″N 37°29′39.87″E

Architecture
- Architect: not known
- Style: Golitsyn Baroque
- Founder: Boris Golitsyn with the participation of Tsar Peter I
- Groundbreaking: 1690
- Completed: 1699

Specifications
- Dome height (outer): 42.3 meters
- Materials: White stone (carbon limestone)

Website
- http://www.dubrovitsy-hram.ru
- Cultural Heritage Site in Russia: Monument № 5010359009 Church on Yandex.Maps: Dubrovitsy

Map of Moscow

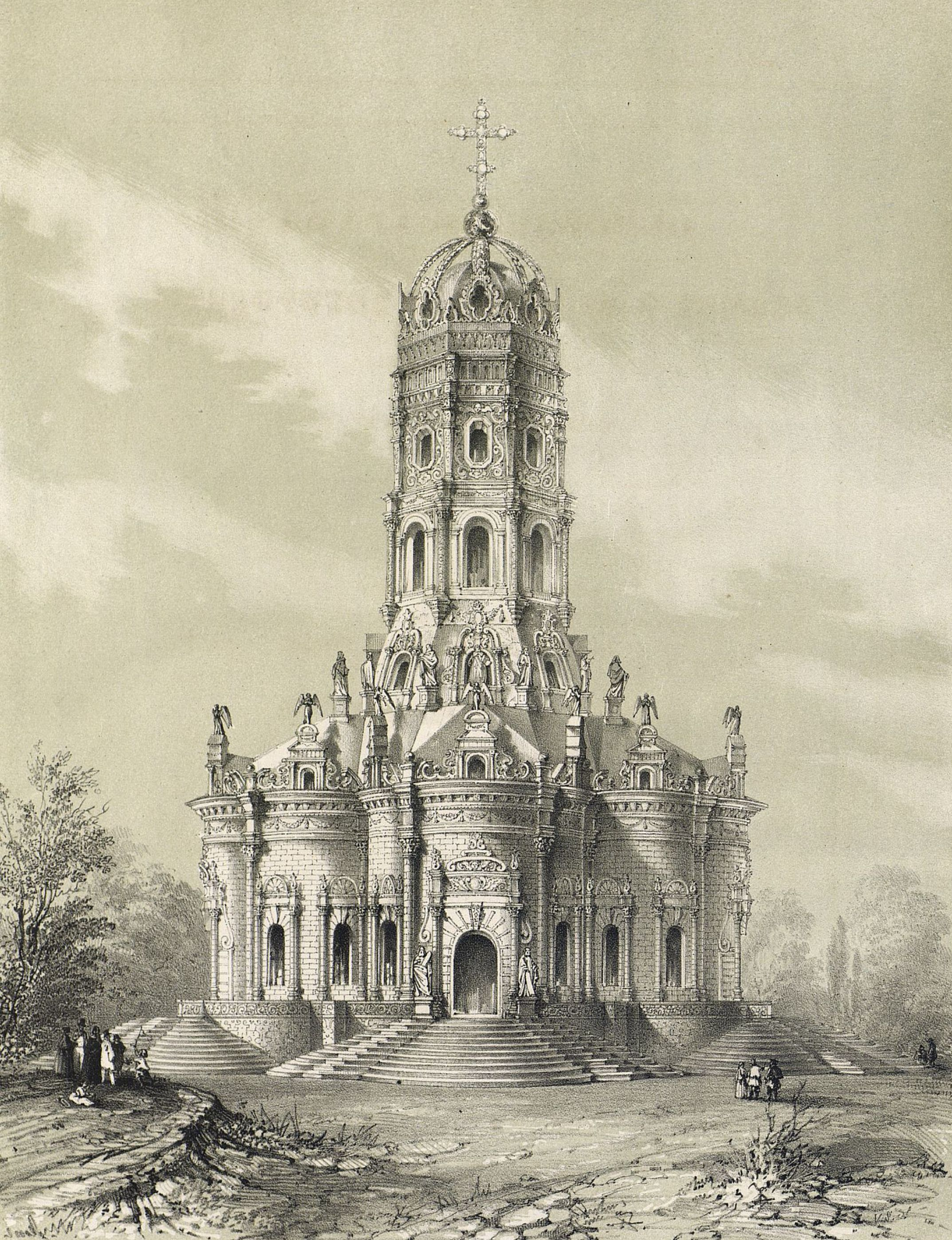
The church in Dubrovitsy at the lithograph by Friedrich Dreger (A.F. Veltman, 1850)

The Church of the Theotokos of the Sign (Dubrovitsy), or The Church of the Holy Sign of the Mother of God in Dubrovitsy, (Russian: Церковь Зна́мения Пресвятой Богоро́дицы в Дубровицах) is a Russian Orthodox church in the village of Dubrovitsy, Podolsk Urban Okrug, Moscow Oblast, Russia. Dubrovitsy is located about 36 km South of Moscow (16 km from the Moscow Ring Road; along the highway Podolsk-Dubrovitsy 6 km). The Dubrovitsy Estate used to belong to the noble families of Morozov, Golitsyn and Dmitriev-Mamonov. The estate consists of a palace, a Horse yard with a Gothic gate, several outbuildings, a church and a park. The church is famous for its unique architecture, unusual to Russian architecture, as well as a mysterious history.

== History ==
The village of Dubrovitsy was first mentioned in the Peremyshlskaya church chronicles in 1627: "An old estate in the village of Dubrovitsy on the Pakhra River at the mouth of the Desna, owned by the Boyar Ivan Vasilyevich Morozov ...". Ivan Morozov († 1655) belonged to an ancient boyar family associated with Moscow from the middle of the XIV century. In 1635–1655, he repeatedly headed the boyar commissions for the management of Moscow in the absence of the Tsar.

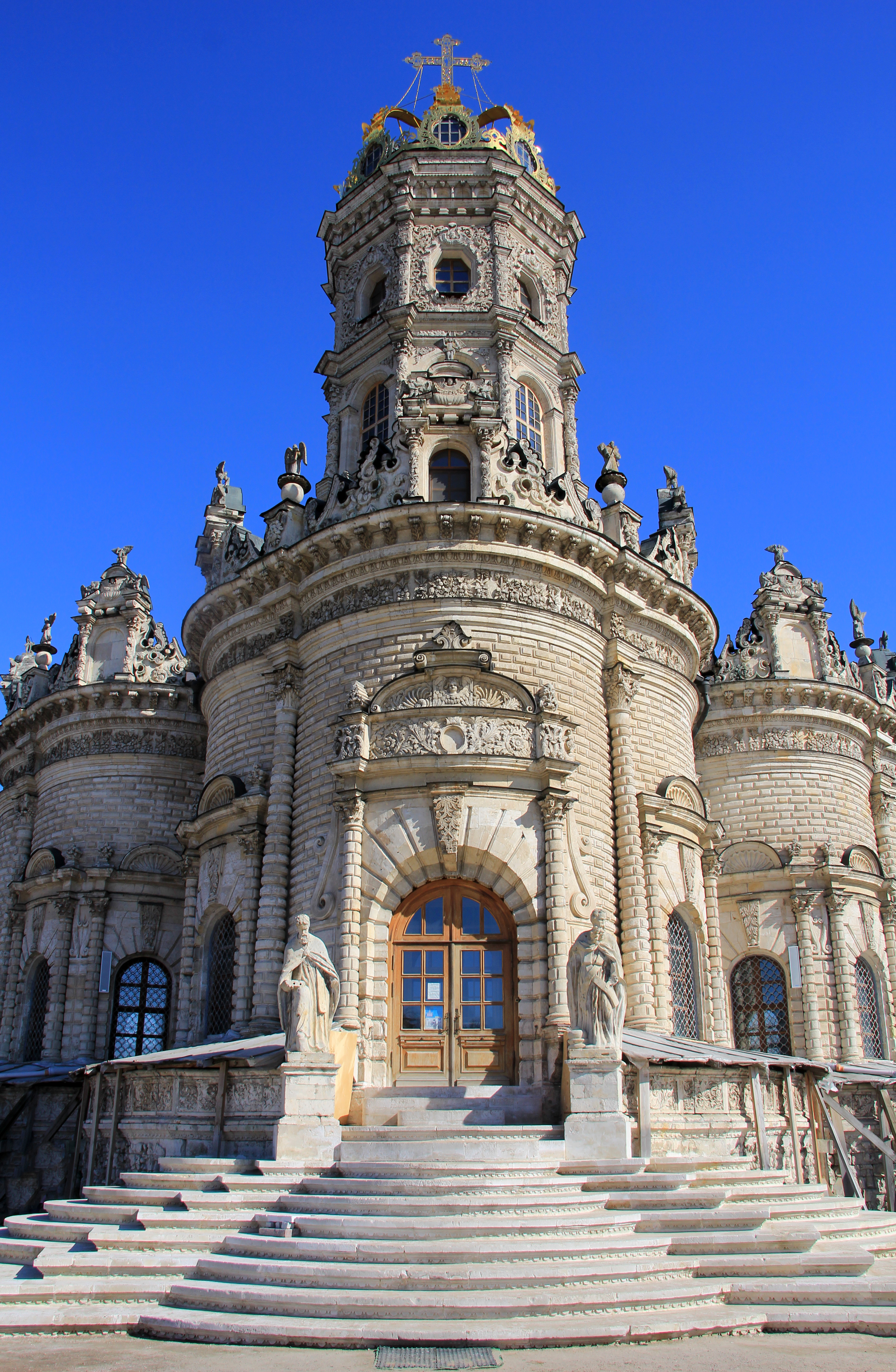
West facade (the main entrance) of the church

At that time, the Dubrovitsy Estate was small; it had boyar's court, cow's yard, and several huts for courtyard people and a wooden church in the name of Prophet Elijah. There was a bell tower in the church. After the death of Ivan Morozov, ancestral lands were inherited by his daughter Aksinia (Xenia), who married Knyaz Ivan Andreevich Golitsyn (Jr) († 1685). Under Ivan Golitsyn, large-scale construction began on the estate. In 1662, a new wooden church was erected, consecrated on December 31 (January 10, new style) of the same year.

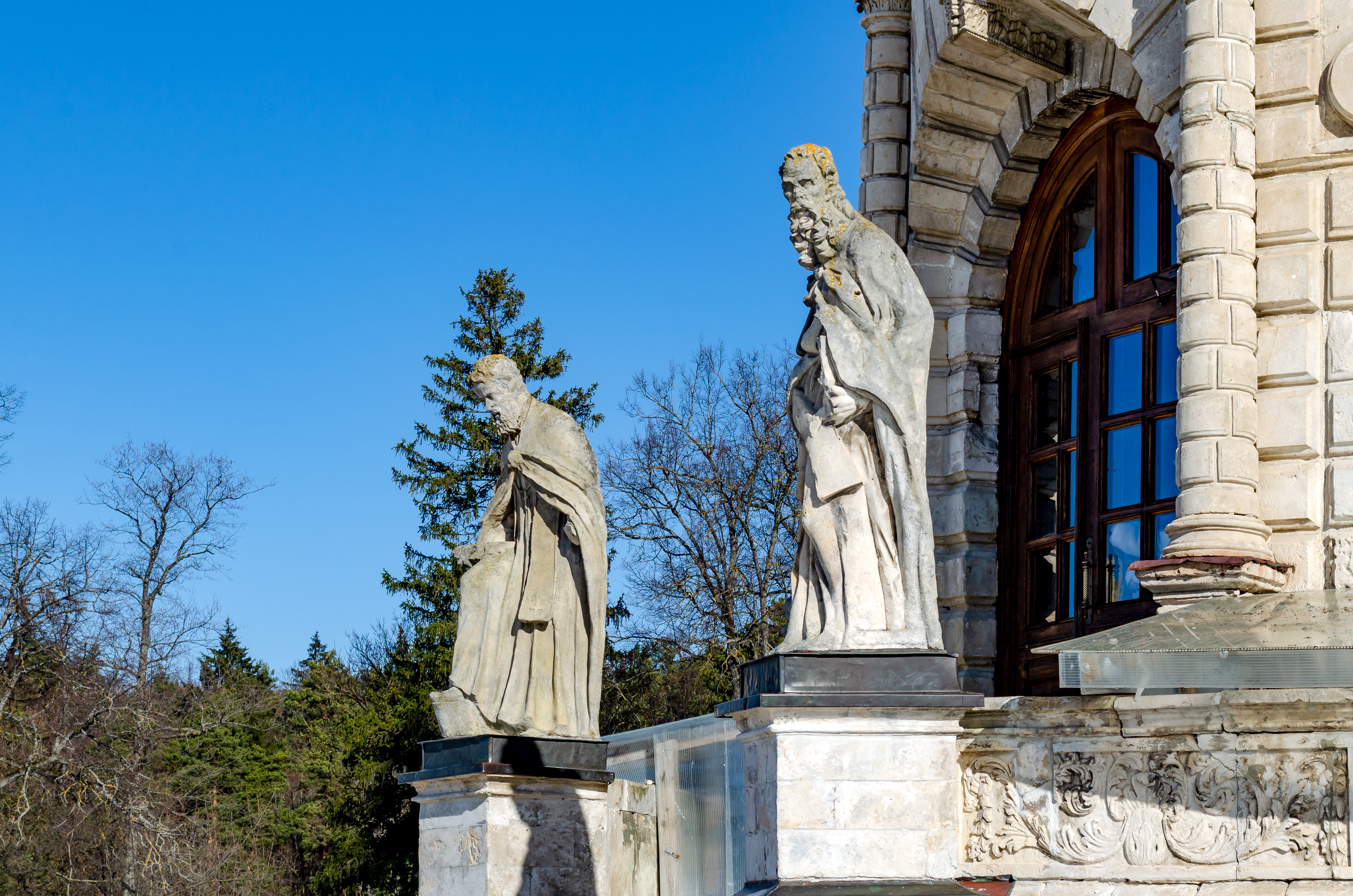
At the main entrance there are two white stone statues of Saints

In 1688, the Dubrovitsy Estate was bought by Boris Alexeyevich Golitsyn (1654–1714); the mentor of the young Tsar Peter I. Boris Golitsyn was well versed in fine art and easily knew foreign languages. He was a socialite, and he liked to communicate with foreigners living in Moscow. In 1689, Boris's cousin Vasily Vasilievich Golitsyn was accused of involvement in a conspiracy against Peter and his supporters. Because of this, Boris Golitsyn fell into disgrace and was forced to retire to his estate Dubrovitsy.

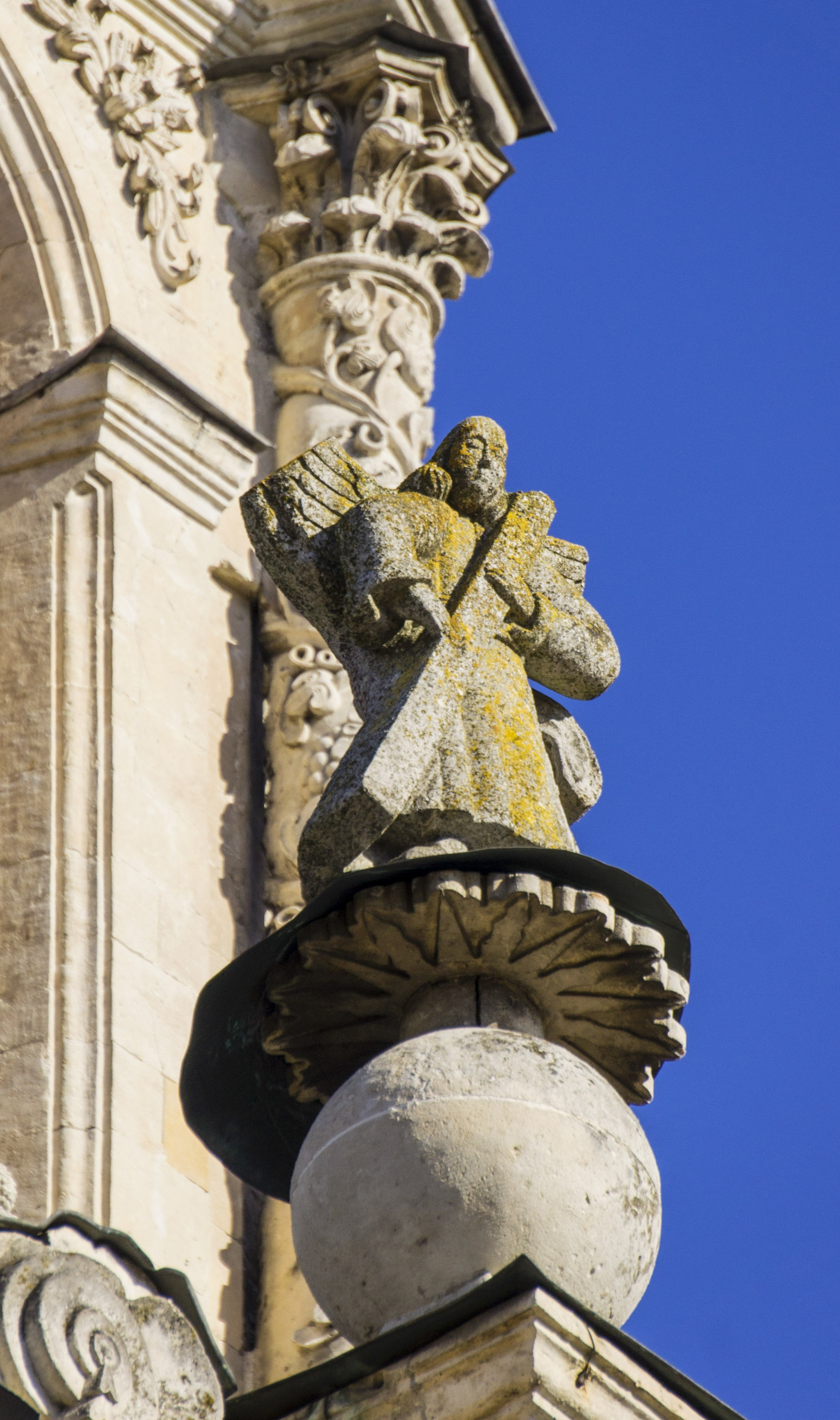
The church is decorated with figures of Cherubs

The proscription did not last long. In 1690, Boris Golitsyn received the boyar dignity. Boyar Boris Golitsyn hoped to head the government, but detractors did not let him rise. He remained in the post of the head of the Kazan department, i.e. his duties included managing the vast southern and eastern lands of Russia.

With the participation of the Tsar in the same year, Boris Golitsyn began to build a stone church in the Baroque tradition. This style was not characteristic of traditional Russian church architecture. In 1690, July 22 (August 1, new style), Tsar Peter arrived in Dubrovitsy to consecrate the foundation of the new church in the name of The Sign of the Blessed Virgin Mary.

The wooden church was dismantled and transported to the neighboring village of Lemeshovo before the start of construction work. On the site of the wooden church a memorial pillar was erected, crowned with a cross.

The new church was built of white stone on the high bank of the cape, formed by the confluence of the Desna and Pakhra rivers. Stones were brought along the Pakhra River from the local quarries of the Podolsk region. White stone, on the one hand, is easy to work with, and on the other hand, it is strong enough to work out the fine details of the decor. Construction work was carried out only in the summer, and in the winter stone carvers worked in the barracks, creating sculptures and high reliefs for the church.

There is a version that the project of the church was worked out under the guidance of Tsar Peter. Peter liked the draft to such an extent that he promised to help with funds and asked not to save money either on architects or on finishing. Manager of the Armoury Chamber of the Moscow Kremlin Alexander Veltman stated that "in general, the architect's intention was to create a semblance of an ancient basilica, with all the embellishments of Catholic and Gothic temples."

Unfortunately, the names of the architects and stone carvers are not known. It is assumed that the best masters were specially invited from Italy. Most likely, their main assistants were Russian krepostnye. Of course, foreign craftsmen working for Boris Golitsyn did not ignore local traditions, which gave rise to a synthesis of Western and Russian styles in church architecture.

In 1699, the construction of the church was completed, but much remained to be done regarding the interior. Invited foreign artists painted images for the iconostasis. Tsar Peter ordered the icon of the Apostles Peter and Paul to be painted at the southern doors and the icon of the Holy Princes Boris and Gleb at the northern doors.

Patriarch of Moscow and all Russia Adrian refused to consecrate the church, citing an uncharacteristic non-standard architectural style. After his death, the church was consecrated on February 11 (February 22, new style), 1704 by the Exarch Metropolitan of Ryazan and Murom Stefan (Yavorsky). During the consecration ceremony, Tsar Peter and his son Alexei prayed here along with many other guests. All the surrounding residents were invited to the celebration, and after 7 days of the celebration a treat was made. Peter donated to the church precious liturgical utensils.

After the death of Boris Golitsyn, in 1714, Dubrovitsy was replaced by many owners. Some owners of Dubrovitsy did not build on the estate or did not own it for long. Mention of them is omitted.

By the middle of the XVIII century, a three-tier white stone bell tower was built south-west of the church. The bell tower was distinguished by the simplicity of finishing the facade. It had nine bells, the largest of which weighed 2 tons. In the southern niche of the bell tower stood a statue of the Saint. Under the bell tower in the 1780s, a warm church was consecrated in the name of the Holy Martyrs Adrian and Natalia.

In 1787, on June 23 (July 4, new style), Empress Catherine II visited Dubrovitsy to buy this estate and present it to her favorite Alexander Matveyevich Dmitriev-Mamonov (1758–1803). The Dmitriev-Mamonov family came from the Varangian leader of Rus' Rurik. Thanks to the Empress's salaries, Alexander Dmitriev-Mamonov became the owner of one of the largest fortunes in Russia.

Retired in 1789, Alexander and his wife Princess Daria Fyodorovna Shcherbatova, the Empress's maid of honor, settled in Dubrovitsy. At that time large-scale construction began in the estate. Alexander began to rebuild the manor palace and the ceremonial northern wings, in the style of classicism. Then an unknown architect added wide terraces to the ends of the main building of the palace.

After the death of Alexander, the Dubrovitsy Estate was inherited by his son Matvey. Count Matvey Alexandrovich Dmitriev-Mamonov (1790–1863) was one of the most noble and wealthy people in Russia. Matvey took part in the Patriotic War of 1812 and in the foreign campaign of the Russian army in 1813–1814. In 1816, when Matvey was about 26 years old, he moved from Moscow to Dubrovitsy and became a recluse there.

In the early 1820s, Matvey began to rebuild the estate in the manner of medieval knightly castles. By order of Matvey, a stone cogged fence was built around the estate. Along the entire length of the fence stood three brick Gothic gates – near the church, the Horse yard and behind the park. The architect who carried out this unusual order is not installed.

To the northeast of the church is a hill with circular paths to the top, planted with acacias. In the literature, one can find the assumption that the mound is a burial place. After the Patriotic War of 1812, a memorial service was held annually on the mound for those who died in the Battle of Borodino.

Matvey lived in Dubrovitsy until mid-1825. As a member of a secret organization aimed at reforming the autocracy, Matvey was arrested, declared insane and placed under guardianship. During the period of the Count's custody under guardianship in Moscow, the first restoration (1848–1850) of the church took place. Architect Fedor Fedorovich Richter supervised the restoration work. Fedor Richter, being a specialist in the field of medieval architecture, decided to remake the church in the "Old Russian" style.

First of all, Fedor Richter replaced Latin verses in cartouches with Church Slavonic quotes from the Gospel in the interior design of the church. The carved wooden Crucifix was removed from the church and placed in the niche of the eastern entrance. Images in the iconostasis, painted in the Italian style, were replaced by icons in the Old Russian style. Images updated the masters of the Armoury Chamber of the Moscow Kremlin. Such alterations were actively opposed by the priest of the local parish Bulkin, filing complaints against Richter, due to which the original appearance of the church was practically preserved.

However, at the insistence of Richter, new liturgical utensils were made; the carvings of the iconostasis and the choir were covered with gilding. On the facade of the building, damaged stones were removed and replaced by new ones. The golden cross and golden crown of the dome, patterned walls and all external sculptures were deprived of layers of street soot.

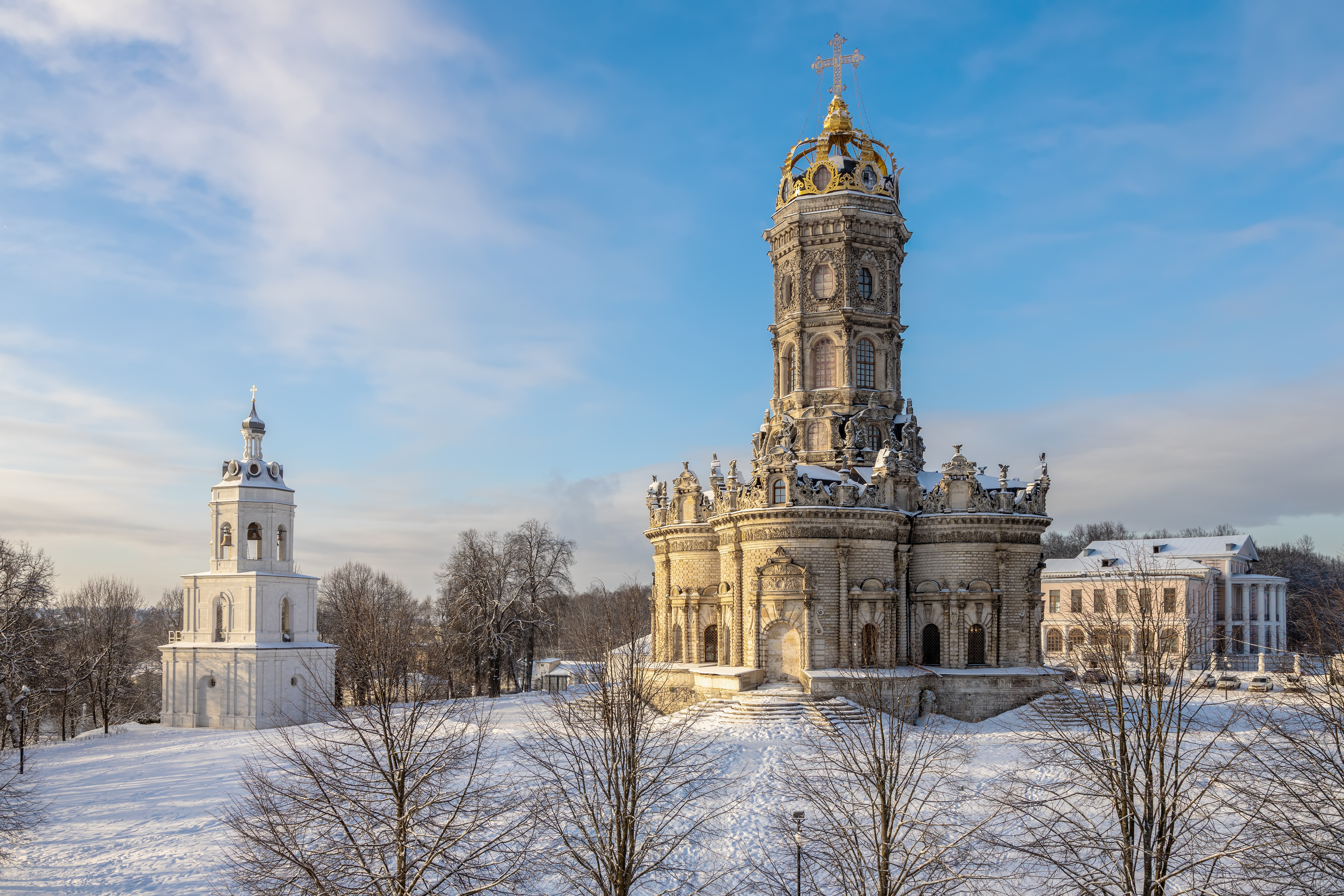
Church in January

The renovated church was consecrated on August 27 (September 8, new style), 1850 by Metropolitan of Moscow and Kolomna Philaret (Drozdov). In memory of his visit to the church, he left a silver washbasin and dish, which were used in the liturgy.

In 1864, Prince Sergei Mikhailovich Golitsyn (1843–1915) became the owner of the Dubrovitsy Estate. Thus, Dubrovitsy returned to the Golitsyn family. Possessing a huge fortune, he devoted himself to social activities. In 1883 he moved from Moscow to Dubrovitsy.

At this time, large-scale construction began in the estate. Above the porch of the front entrance to the palace there was a glazed canopy resting on two cast-iron columns. Both side verandas of the palace were glazed. A fountain in the form of two cast-iron bowls brought from the Ural factories of Sergei Golitsyn was installed in front of the palace's facade. The stone cogged fence that surrounded the estate was dismantled.

An arched cast iron bridge was thrown across the central alley of the manor park. Nearby was a small hut "Doll House" for the games of the youngest daughter of the owner of the estate. In order to replenish the funds for the maintenance of the estate, part of the estate was given over to summer cottages for wealthy summer residents.

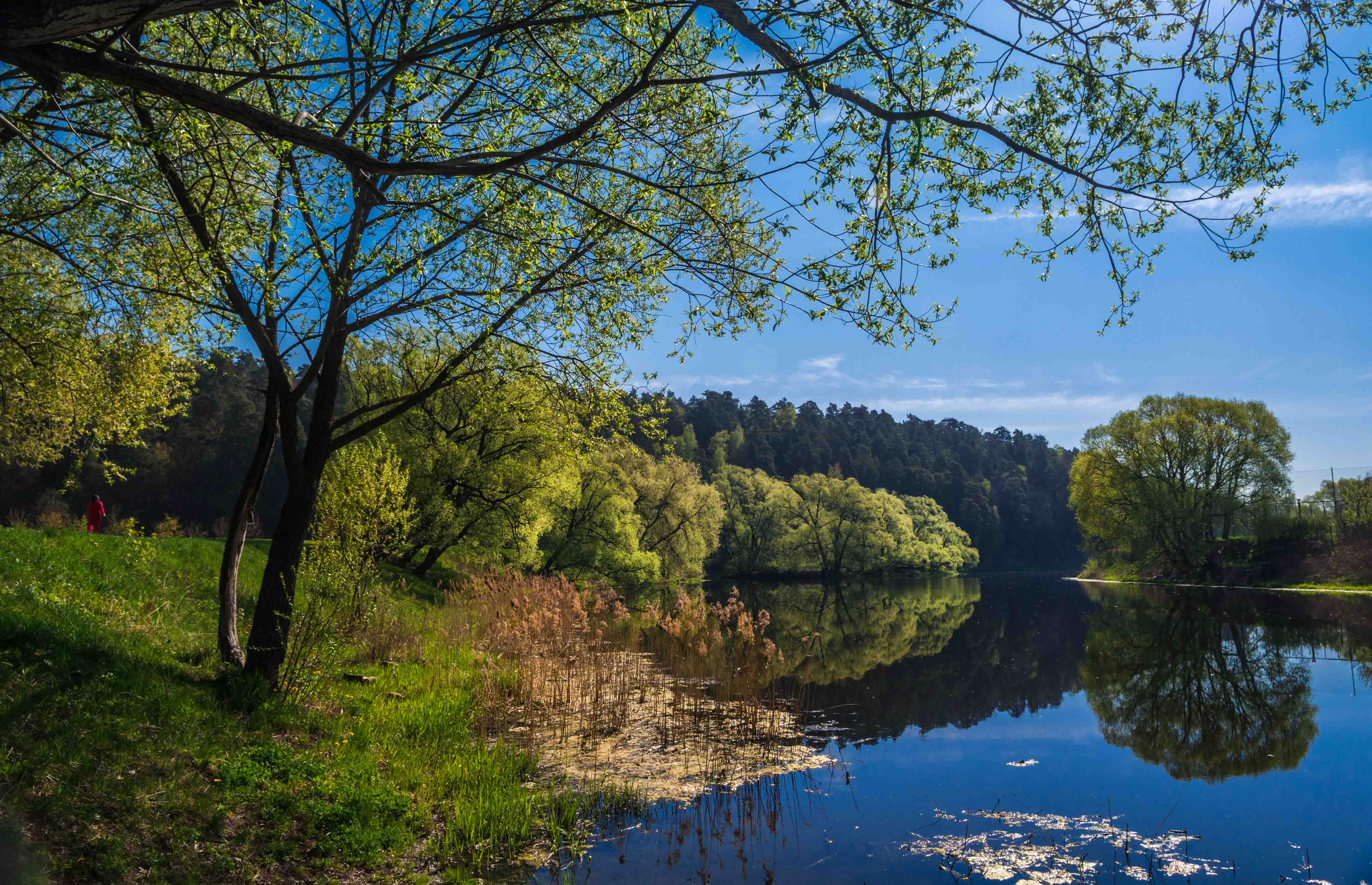
Pakhra river

By the beginning of the XX century, a parish school was operating at the church, as well as an almshouse for poor peasants. After 1917, the church was still active for more than ten years, until in 1929 the services ceased in it. In the same year, all clerics were evicted from their homes in Dubrovitsy. In September 1931, the bell tower was blown up by fighters against religion, and later its remains were dismantled to the last stone. The church also suffered; many sculptures of Saints and statues of Angels were damaged. From 1930 to 1990 the church was closed to worship.

In the 30s, the renovation of the estate began. The original layout of the palace building, a significant part of the murals, as well as the stucco on the walls and ceilings were destroyed. The third floor was added to the palace without any respect for its previous architectural forms.

In August 1960, the Dubrovitsy Estate and the church were recognized as architectural monuments and were taken under state protection. Since 1961, the administration of the All-Union Scientific Research Institute of Livestock Breeding has been located in the manor palace. The church passed into the jurisdiction of this institute. The original appearance of the manor buildings was returned during the restoration work of 1967–1972. The palace was restored in two years, but the restoration of the church, which lasted several decades, was not completed. The premises of the church were used by the institute as a warehouse.

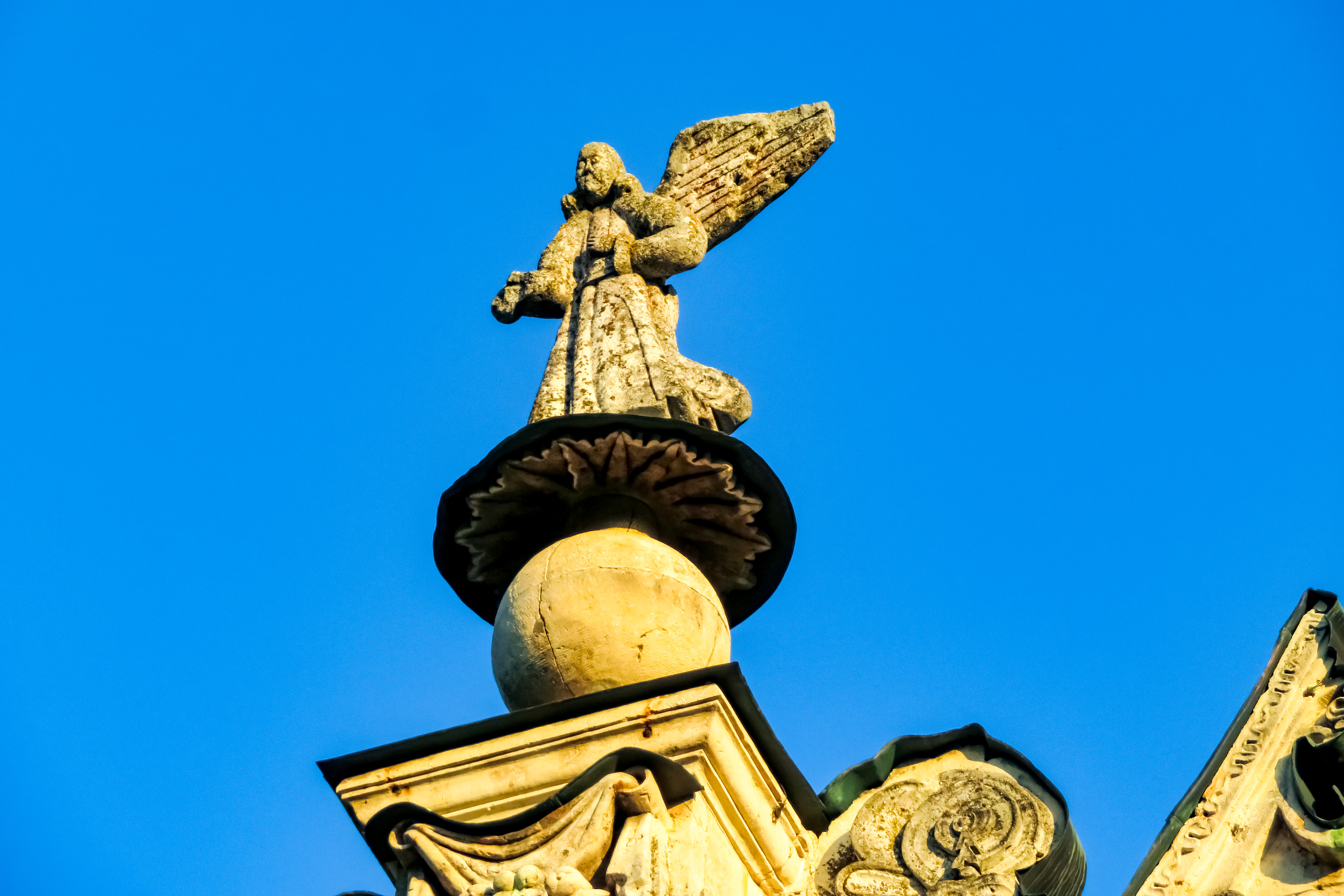
The angel

The church was returned to believers in 1990. The parish of the church belongs to the Podolsk Diocese, included in the Moscow Metropolitanate of the Russian Orthodox Church. The first liturgy in the church was celebrated on October 14, 1990.

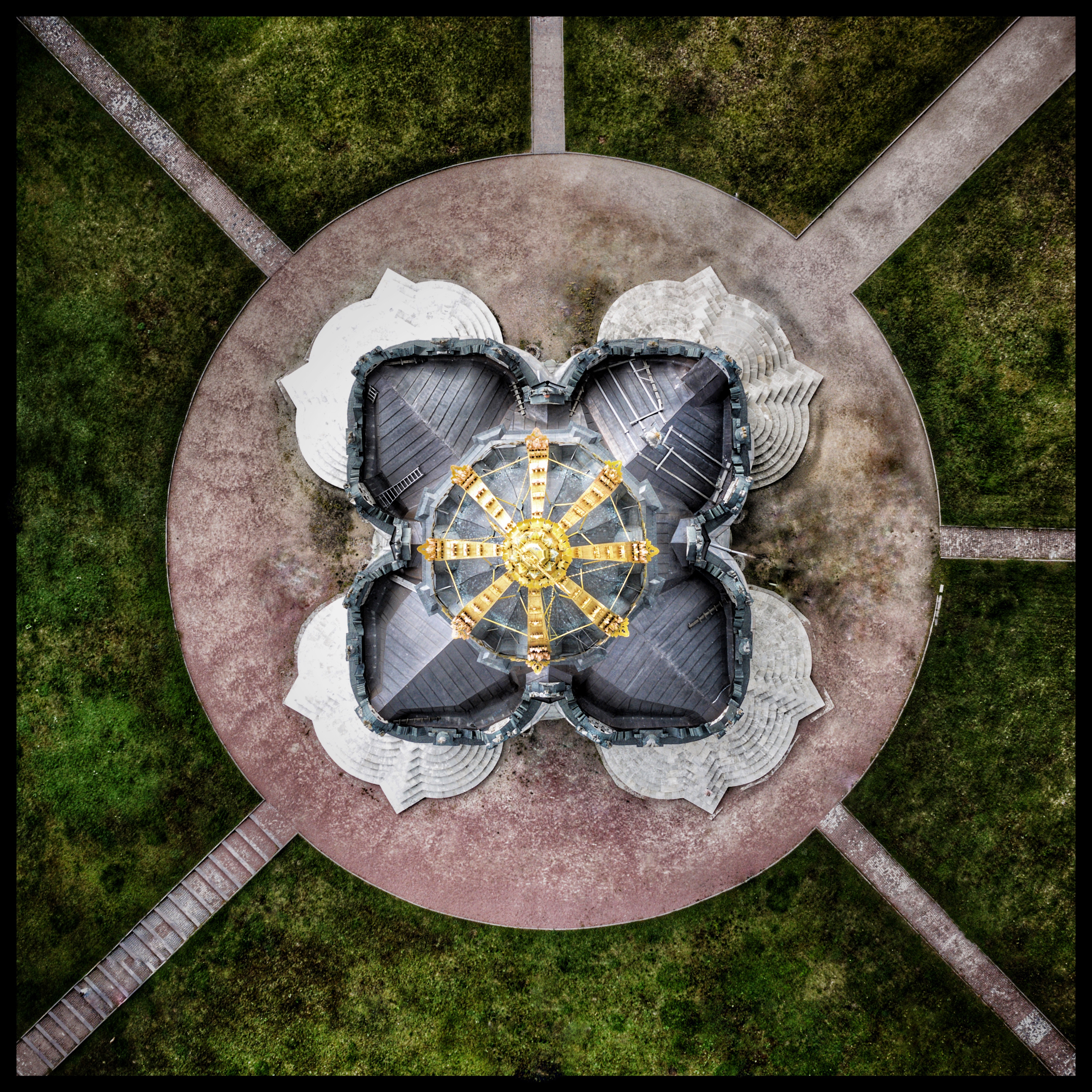
Top view

The church, which had been under lock and key for many years, required repairs. In 2002–2003, restoration work was carried out in preparation for the 300th anniversary of the church. The reconstruction of the interiors of the church, the reconstruction of the marble floor, improvement of the adjacent territory of the church and the Golitsyn estate were carried out. The cross crowning the church was restored, and the old decayed crown was replaced by a new one. The mound, located next to the church, was equipped, and an observation deck was placed on its top. Inside the church, original Latin verses were restored in cartouches accompanying high reliefs. Icons were restored in the workshop of the State Historical Museum and in the workshop of the Tretyakov Gallery.

The restoration of the external decoration of the church remained incomplete. On October 7, 2009, the World Monuments Fund included the church in the list of objects under threat of destruction. The church received a 2010 award from the U.S. Ambassadors Fund for Cultural Preservation for restoration efforts.

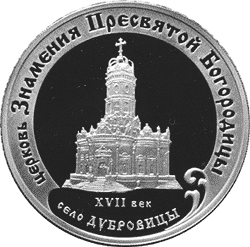
3 rubles, reverse. Bank of Russia coin, 2004

The Main Department of Cultural Heritage of the Moscow Region exercises state control over the preservation of the church and the implementation of comprehensive repair and restoration work on it. In 2017, this department approved the Owner's Commitment to preserve the church, which outlines the owner's responsibility and behavior at the protected site.

In 2022, the bell tower destroyed in 1931 was restored near the Znamenskaya Church. For the sacrament of baptism in the lower tier of the bell tower, a church was built in honor of the martyrs Adrian and Natalia. On November 8, 2022, Patriarch of Moscow and all Rus' Kirill consecrated this church.

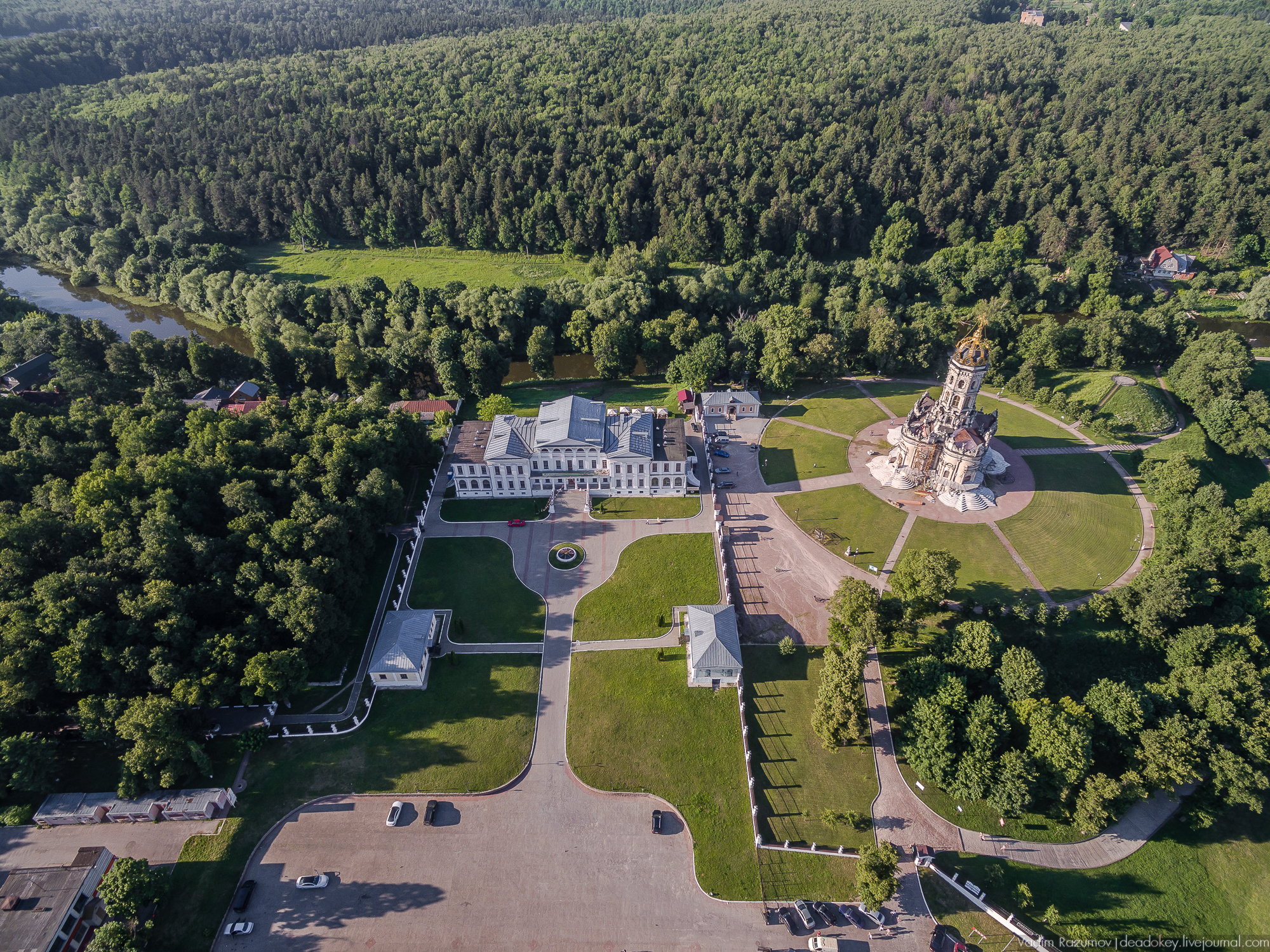
Manor house and church

The church was three times on the verge of destruction. It was for the first time during the stay of French troops in Dubrovitsy in 1812. They burned all the surrounding villages and ravaged the manor palace. The church then did not suffer. The church – with minimal losses (in particular, it lost its bell tower in 1931) – was preserved in the post-revolutionary years. In 1941, during the Nazi offensive on Moscow, the church was mined. Fortunately, it was in those days that the Nazis were stopped, and the order to blow up the church was not received.

== Architecture ==
=== Exterior ===
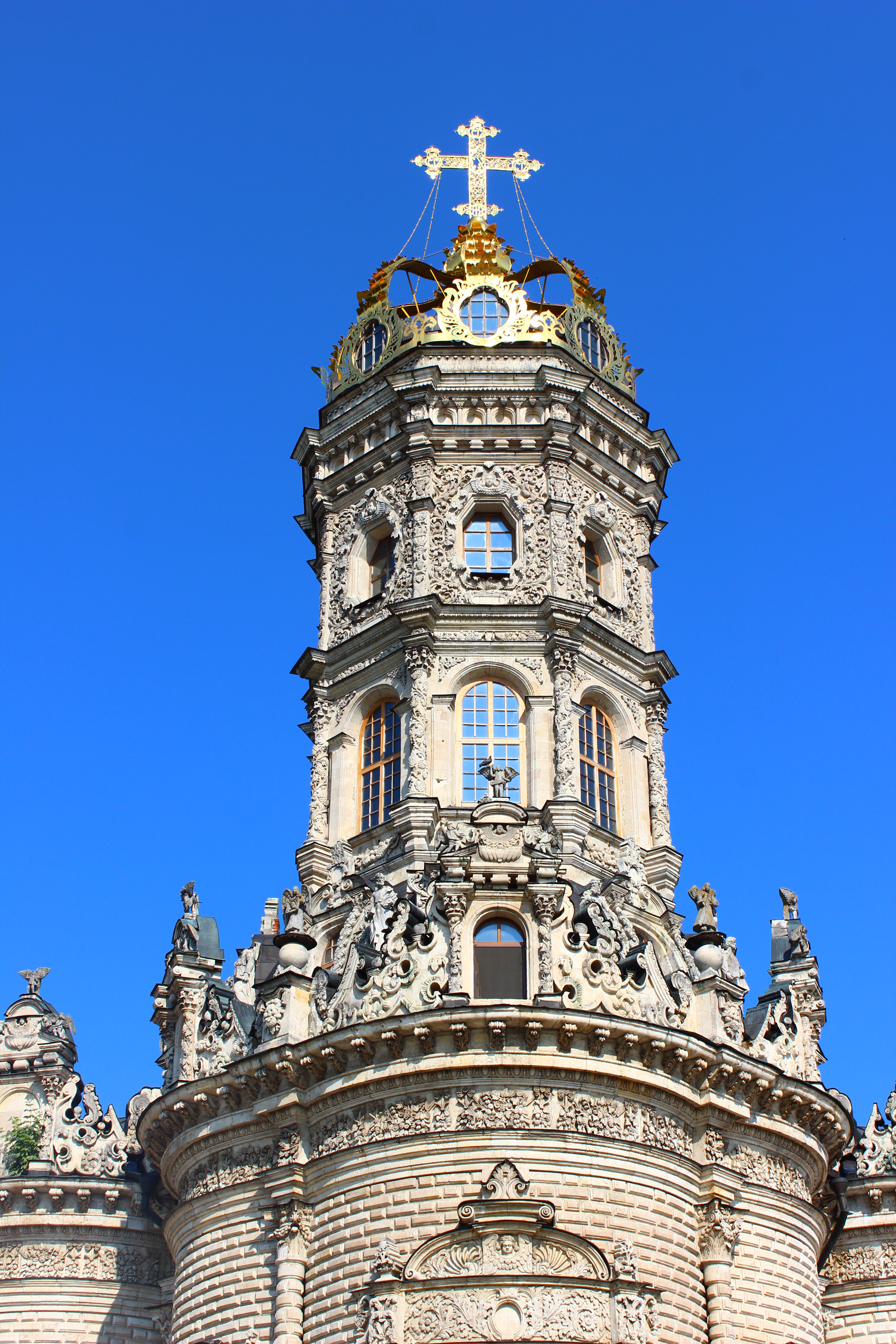
The church and its octagonal tower with the sculptures of the eight Apostles of Jesus Christ

The church is a centric structure: an equilateral cross with rounded ends; the endings are divided into three parts. The type of centric temple of this shape was widespread in Catholic countries and expressed the main features of the European Baroque of the XVII century. The architectural composition of the church is an "octagon on the quadrangle" type building. This composition was mainly used in the design of Russian Orthodox churches. Above the central part of the church rises an octagonal tower, completely covered with intricate relief ornaments. Cornices divide the entire structure of the tower into three light tiers. The lower tier is formed by rectangular windows with rounded top. The middle tier has the same windows, and the upper tier has small octagonal windows. The church is topped by a dome with four-petal windows and a carved gilded crown. The wedding of a church with a crown is completely not in the Russian tradition.

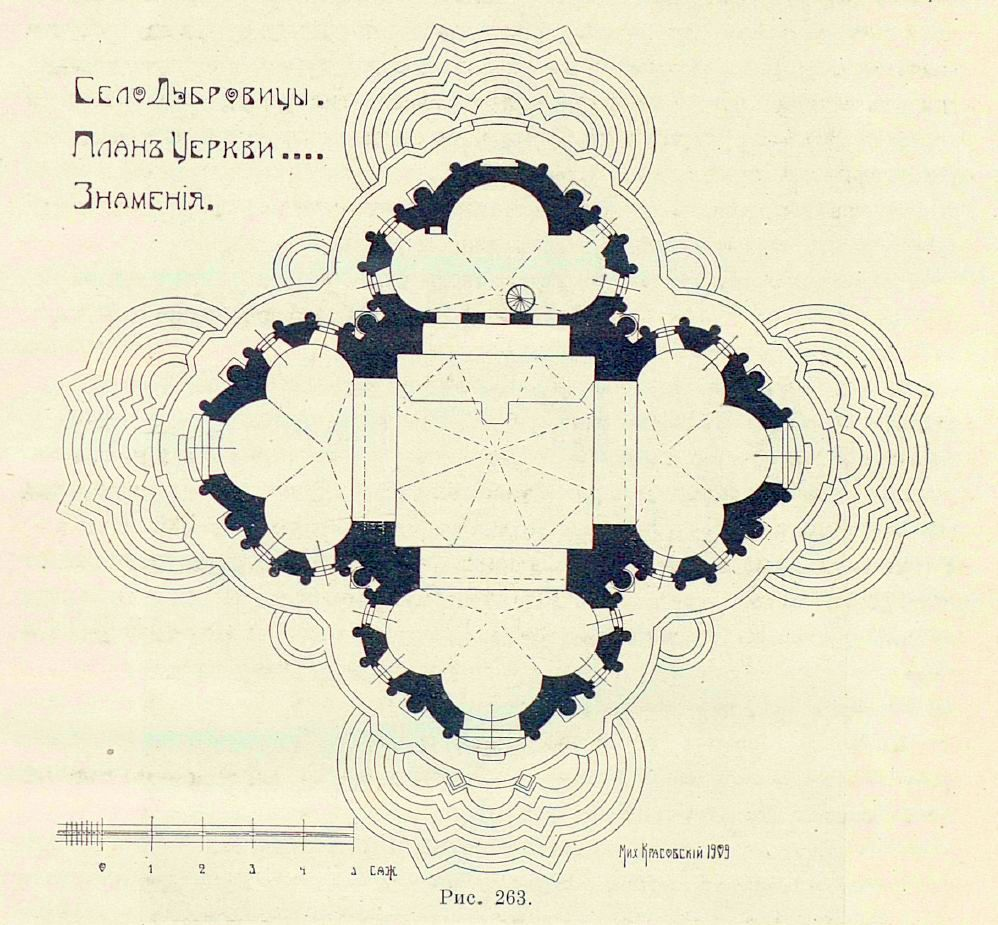
Cruciform plan (M.V. Krasovsky, 1910), showing the entrance (below), altar (top) and petal-shaped stairs

The central part of the church is a regular square, to which semicircular parts adjoin on all sides; the eastern part as an altar, and the other three are porches. Semicircles are decorated with columns with Corinthian capitals – not of the classical form, but freely stylized. The central part is connected to the altar and the porches by arched spans, turning its walls into four pylons. The first floor is built on a high foundation; the church also has a semi-basement. Around the church, repeating the outline of its plan, there is an open terrace fenced with a parapet.

The church has four fan-shaped staircases leading to the doors. There are three entrance doors located from the west, north and south. In the eastern (altar) wall outside the church, a niche was made instead of a door. In the depths of this niche there was previously a carved crucifix with the forthcoming Virgin and John the Apostle (now the crucifix is in the church). Doos framing is made of coarsely rusticated stone. The portals are flanked by Corinthian columns supporting the ornamental frieze. The basement, the parapet of the terrace and the church itself are covered from top to bottom with relief ornaments. Many of these decor elements have never been found in Russian art before: a "diamond" facet, various columns, relief curls and brushes, shells, exotic flowers and fruits carved from stone, leaves of the Mediterranean plant acanthus.

The cornice of the church is very decorated. False windows are installed on the pediments around the entire circumference of the church. There are four small figures of Angels above each false window in the attic. Statues of Cherubs on ball pedestals are located between the false windows. These eight cherubs installed on the roof of the church hold the tools of Christ's Passions: spear, ladder, cross, nails, crown of thorns, sponge, etc.

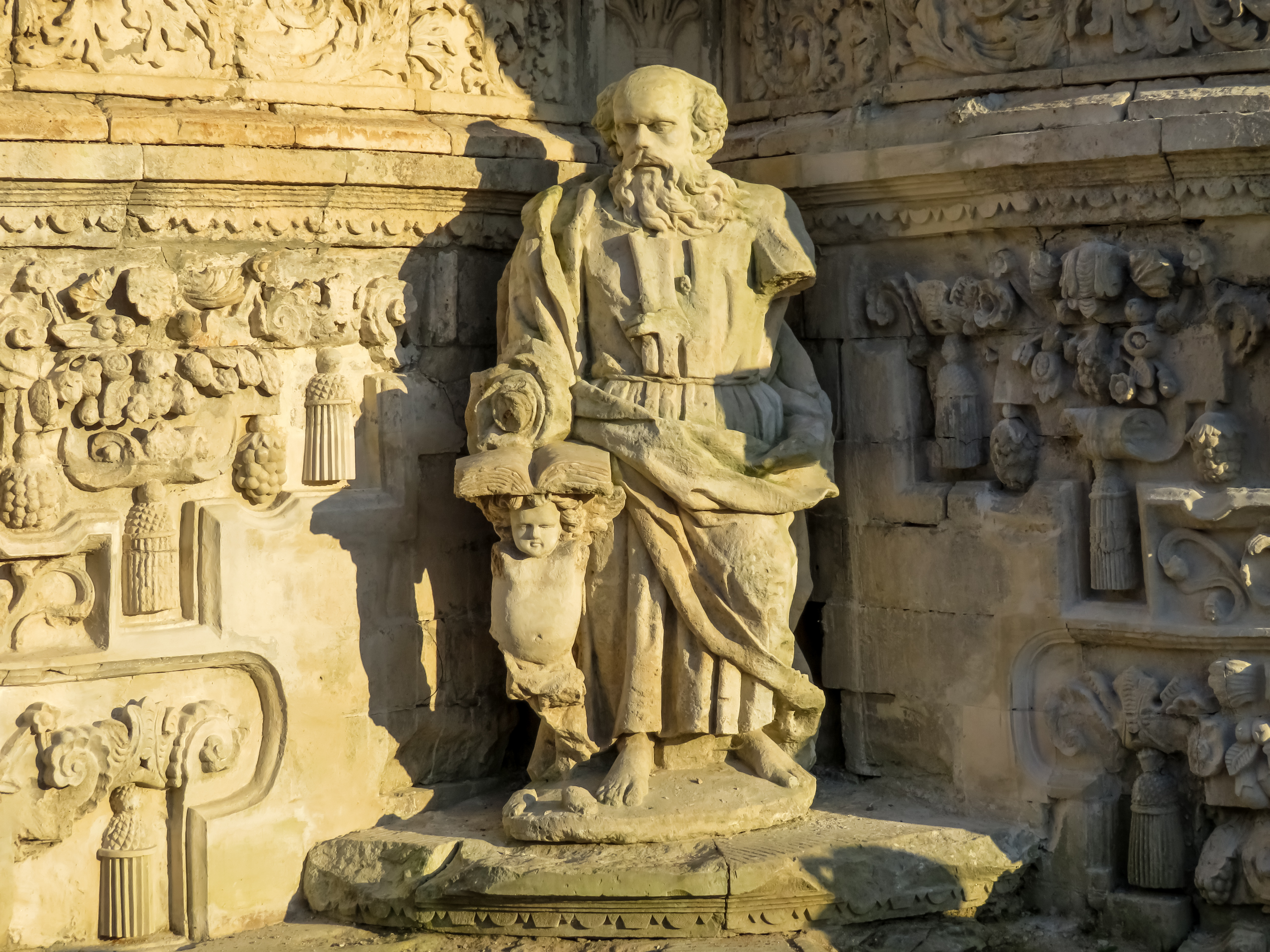
Sculptures of the Four Evangelists in the corners of the basement

The church is decorated with a life-size sculpture. At the main entrance, on the sides of the western staircase, two white stone statues are installed. On the left side is a statue of St. John Chrysostom, under his heel a bag of money, and on the right side, St. Gregory the Theologian, with a book and a light fixture at his feet. On the roof, right above the western entrance, is a statue of St. Basil the Great with a miter at his feet.

Eight statues of the Apostles are installed at the base of the octagonal tower, between the windows. In addition to the books, the Apostles previously held the tools of Christ's Passions. Sculptural images of biblical characters were not traditional for Russian church architecture.

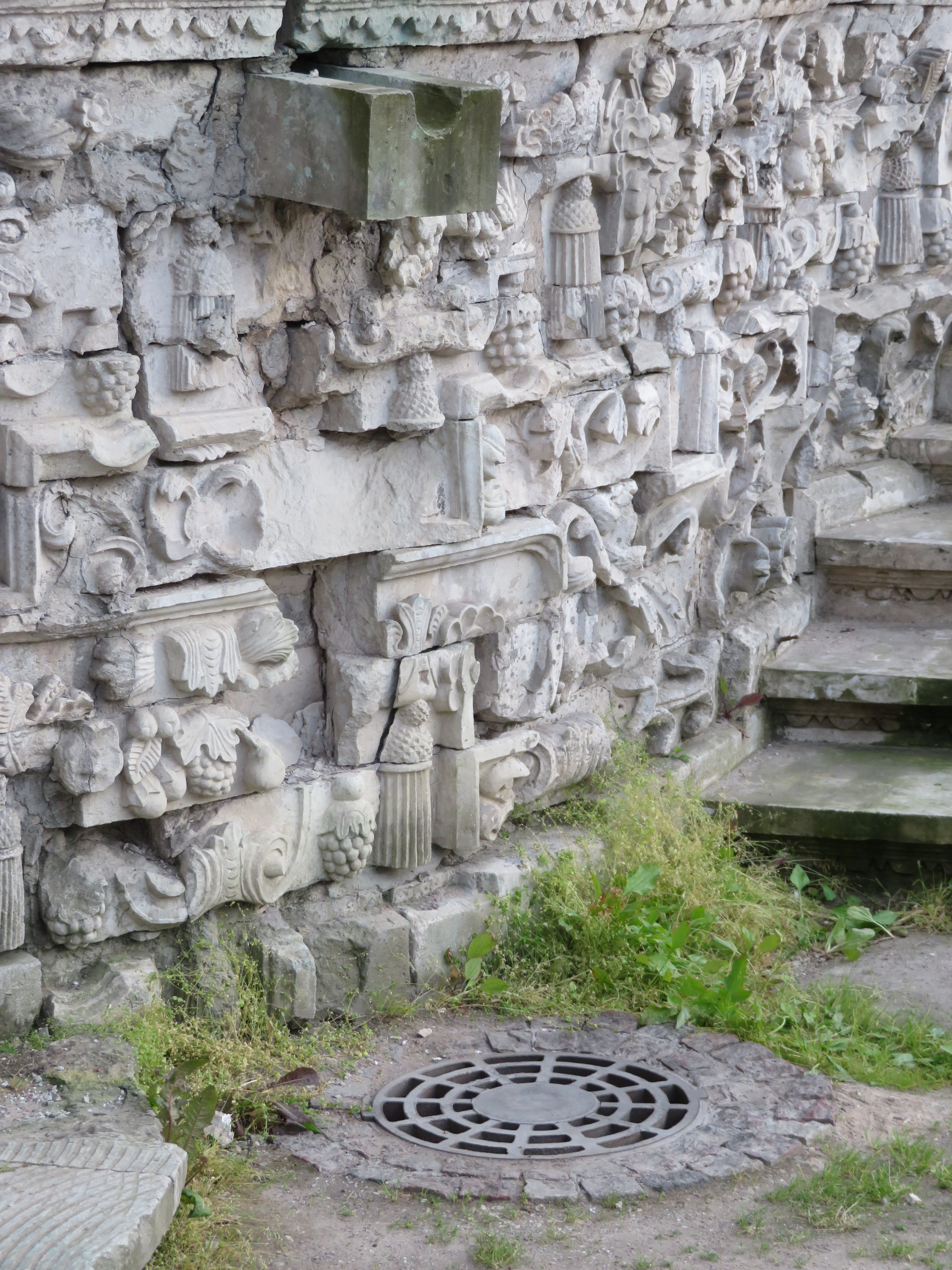
The high foundation is richly decorated with carvings and ornaments

Near the ground, in the corners of the basement, are located, now badly damaged, the statues of the Four Evangelists: Mark, Luke, Matthew and John. The statues are artistically executed, but in general they are all disproportionately short. The sculptural objects at the feet of the Evangelists reproduce one of the incarnations of a tetramorph. Tetramorph appears in the form of four living creatures: an angel, a lion, a calf and an eagle, which guard the four corners of the throne of the Lord and the four borders of paradise.

If you walk clockwise from the main entrance of the church along the basement, the statues of the Evangelists will be located as follows: from the northwest side, Matthew with an Angel; in the northeast, Luke with a winged calf; on the southeast side, John, at his feet an eagle; on the southwest side, Mark with a winged lion.

=== Interior ===
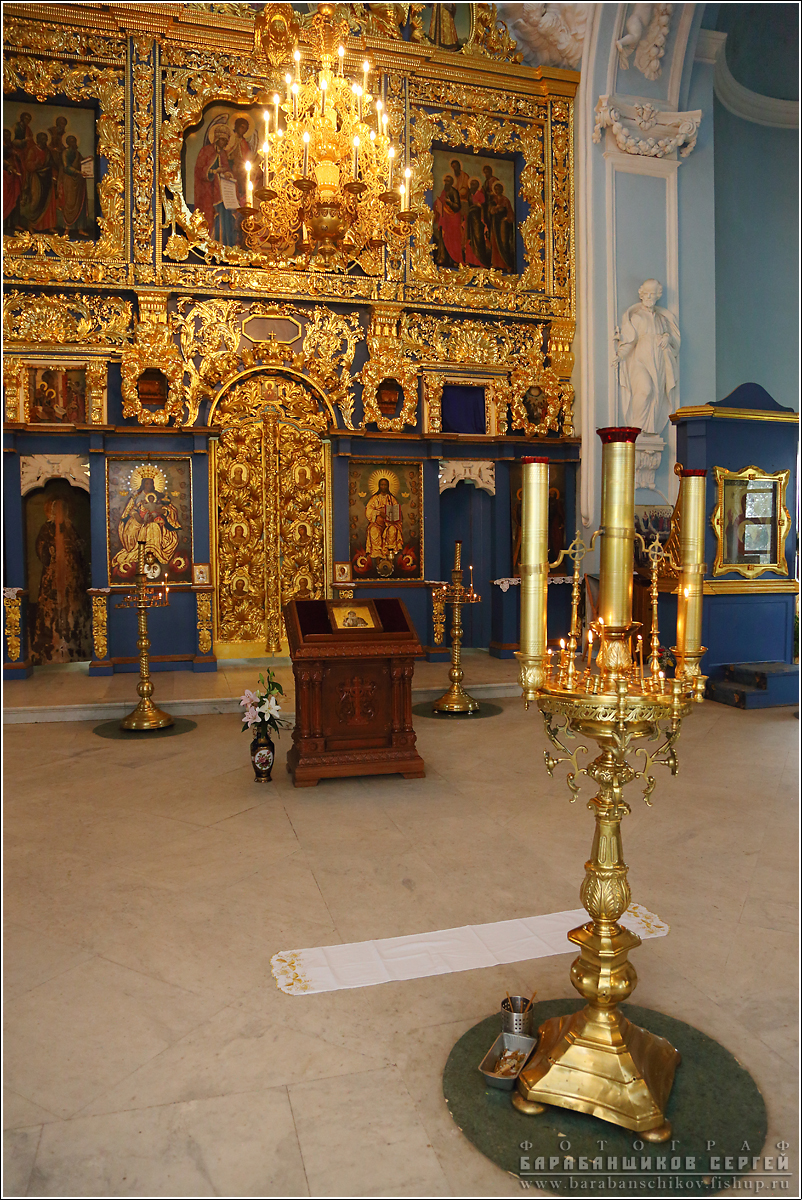
Carved iconostasis in the Baroque style

If you stand in the middle of the quadrant of the building, you can see the entire interior of the church, with the exception of the altar, which is hidden from view by a high iconostasis. Four semicircular arches together with four pendentives (sails) serve as the base of the central tower. On the arches there are medallions with bas-relief images of Boris Golitsyn, his wife and son.

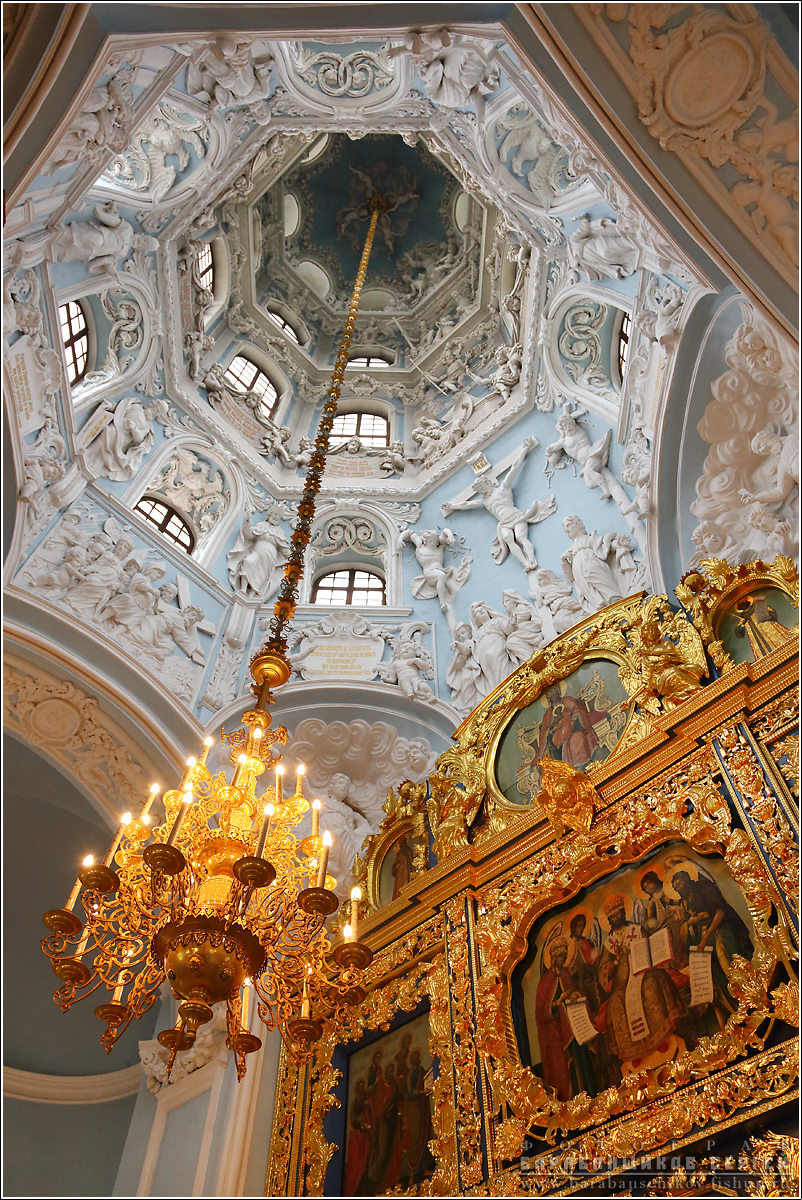
The interior is richly decorated with high relief compositions

On the four pillars of the supporting arches there are several figures: on the eastern wall to the right of the iconostasis is St. Joseph with a lily flower in his hand; to the left, Virgin Mary, carrying the Child Christ to the temple. Opposite, on the western wall, is Anna the Prophetess, on the opposite side Simeon the God-receiver, holding young Jesus in his arms.

On the sails there are figures of evangelists in swirling clouds and surrounded by putti: on the right above the iconostasis, Matthew with an angel; on the left, John with an eagle; opposite John above the choir, Luke with a calf; on the opposite side, Mark with a lion.

The interior of the church is decorated with many relief compositions, inscriptions in Latin, a carved iconostasis and a Baroque choir. Relief compositions are made in the Stucco technique, all made on biblical motives and are arranged in registers.

==== First register ====
On the eastern wall above the iconostasis is the relief scene Crucifixion. To the right of this scene is a Latin inscription indicated by two seated putti. Latin texts accompany other scenes as well, and are located in cartouches decorated with shells, acanthus leaves and garlands. According to historian I.V. Kuvshinskaya, "the Latin verses of the temple can be compared with a complex polyphonic choral performance of poems, the main theme of which is the theme of the sufferings of Christ on the Cross ...".

On the western wall, directly above the choir, is the laying of the crown of thorns scene. Above the northern arch is the carrying of the cross scene. Further above the south arch is the laying in the tomb scene. Figures of six Prophets are placed between the windows of the lower register. To the left of the Crucifixion is King David with a harp in his hands. On the opposite wall is King Solomon with a scepter. The Prophets Moses and Elijah are depicted on the north and south wall, respectively. Moses has the Tablets of Testimoni in his right hand. Elijah has a belt in his left hand. On the western wall are the figures of the Old Testament high priests. Closer to Elijah is Zachariah with a scroll, closer to Moses is Aaron with a thurible in his right hand. Realistic features of the characters speak of the European school of plastic arts.

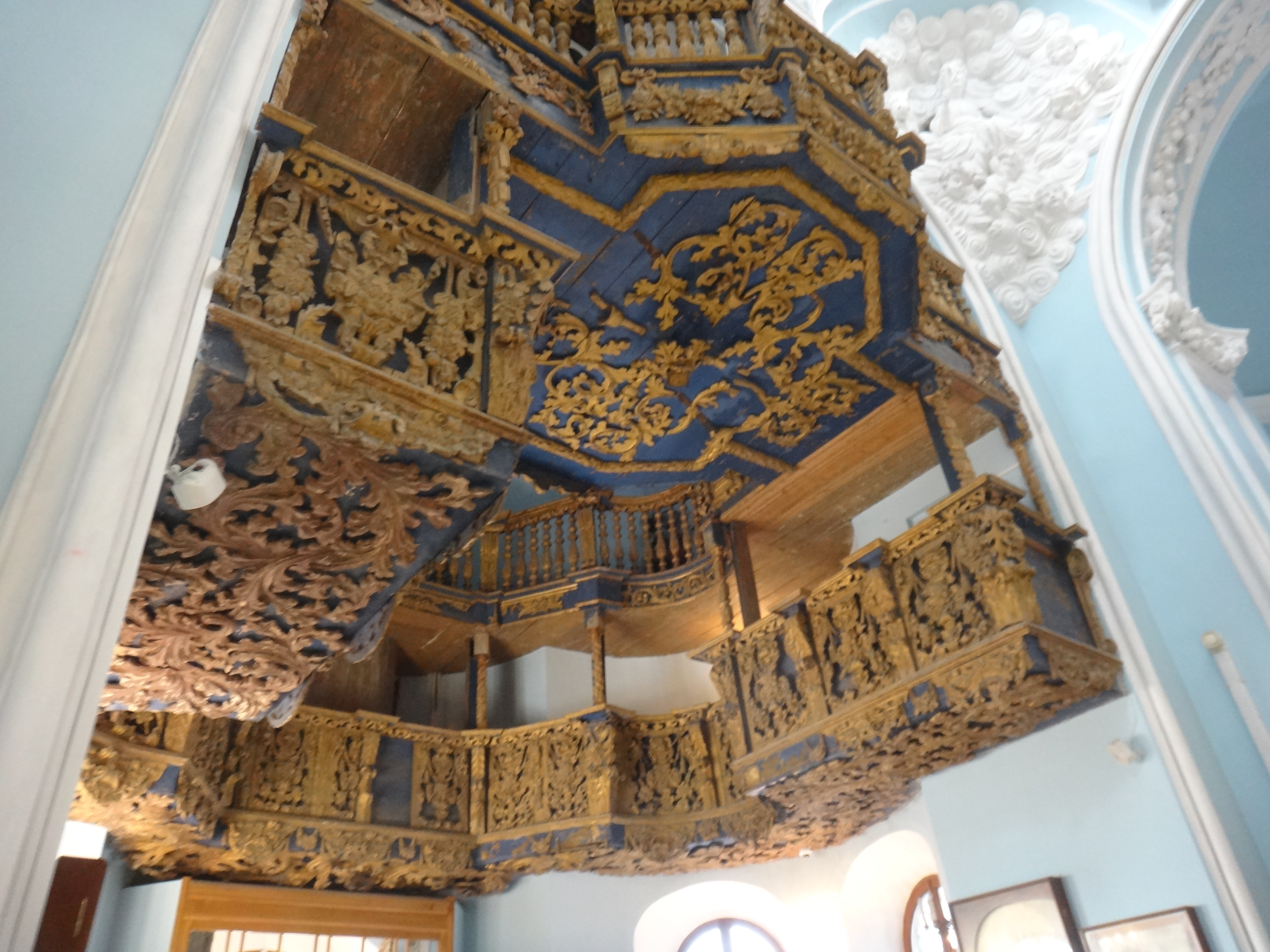
Two-tiered choir with gilded wood carvings

==== Second, third, and upper register ====
Above the scene crucifixion is a composition of the resurrection of Jesus), taken from the Western tradition. In the spacers between the windows of the second register there are figures of three putti holding cartouches with Latin inscriptions. The third register contains the Coronation of the Virgin scene. The plot is unusual for Russian iconography. Between the windows of the third register there are figures of Angels carrying the tools of Christ's passions. On the upper register on the eastern wall is the figure of the Lord of Sabaoth (Tzevaot), supported by two archangels.

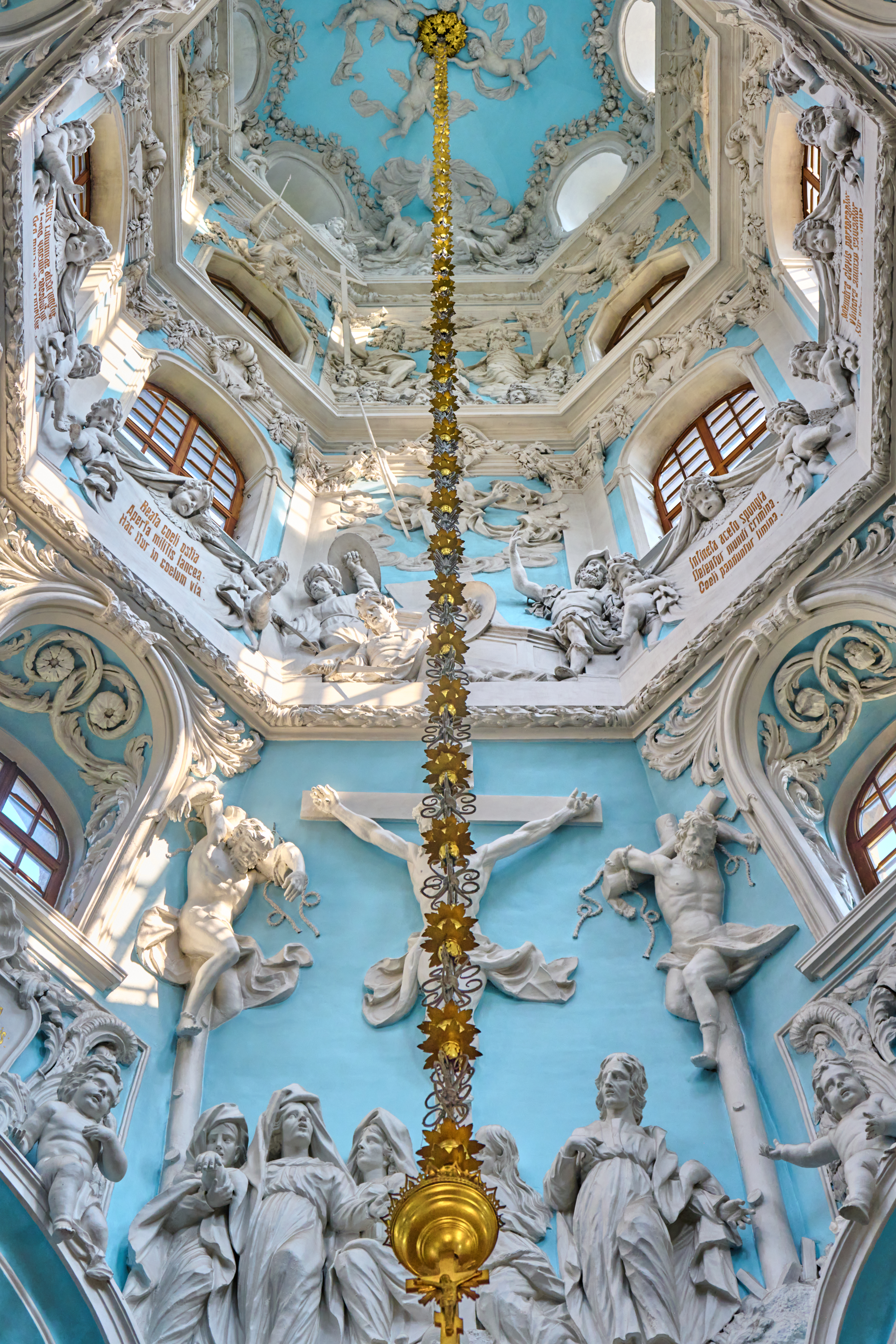
Stucco ceiling

In the church, the wooden sculpture crucifix is over 300 years old. A four-tiered iconostasis rises in front of the wall separating the altar from the church. In the decoration of the iconostasis there are a variety of plant and ornamental patterns, in places are sculptural images of the angels. The iconostasis is filled with ancient icons surrounded by gilded carvings. Eleven icons out of twenty-six, that were previously in the iconostasis, are preserved. The icon of the sign of the most holy Theotokos is especially revered in the church and is a copy of the storied Novgorod Icon of Our Lady of the Sign. Architectural historian M.V. Krasovsky described the iconostasis of the church as follows: "In its marvelous fabulousness and high technology, it surpasses all the iconostases in the Russian Baroque that only I have ever seen ...".

In the western porch there is a massive two-tiered choir overhanging the church entrance. It is covered entirely with exquisite gilded carvings. The lower tier is designed in the form of a gallery, the upper one in the form of a balcony resting on the columns of this gallery. A stone staircase leads to the choir in the northwest pylon with the relief of Simeon the God-receiver. To communicate the lower tier of the choir with the upper one, a spiral staircase is arranged, located at the western end of the choir and enclosed in a solid pipe. The decoration of the choir is varied, but the carving is not so common here, because of which the dark blue background appears as large spots among golden patterns.

In contrast to the middle part of the church, the porches are distinguished by their simplicity. There is no stucco, and the light in each of the three porches penetrates through two pairs of large vestibule windows and the glass door of the main entrance.

== See also ==
- Eastern Orthodox church architecture
- Russian church architecture
- Naryshkin Baroque

== Sources ==
- Semenov, Konstantin. (2011). The Church of the Holy Sign of the Mother of God in Dubrovitsy: Photo Gallery. p. 96. / Семенов К.А. Церковь Знамения Пресвятой Богородицы в Дубровицах: Фотоальбом. // Гуманитарный проект компании "РусГазИнжиниринг" и фонда "Святогорец" в г. Подольске. – Подольск: РусГазИнжиниринг, 2011. – 96 С.: ил. – 500 экз. (in English and Russian)
- A.G. Kolosova, R.P. Fiodorova / Колосова А.Г., Фёдорова Р.П. Дубровицы, «Воздвиг он храм сей величавый». // 4-е изд., перераб. и доп. – Дубровицы, Московская область: ОАО «Тульская типография», 2009. — 94 С. (in Russian).
- A.F. Veltman / Вельтман А.Ф. Обновление храма Знамения пресвятые богородицы в селе Дубровицах. // М.: Тип. А. Семена, 1850. – 15 C. (in Russian) on line
- A.M. Tarunov / Тарунов A.M. Дубровицы. // Серия: Памятники Подмосковья. – М.: Московский рабочий, 1991 – 112 С., ил. (in Russian).
- A.N. Grech / Греч А.Н. Дубровицы. // Подмосковные музеи: Путеводители. Вып. 4. – М.–Л.: Гос. изд-во, 1925. – С. 69–116. (in Russian) on line
- E.G. Filipovich / Филипович Э.Г. О Дубровицком храме и не только о нем. // Изд. 5-е, доп. – М.: БЕЛМАКС, 2012. – 103 С. – ISBN 978-5-901388-08-2. (in English and Russian).
- I.A. Dmitrovsky / Дмитровский И.А. Дубровицы, знатное село. Имение князя С. М. Голицына. // М.: Книга по Требованию, 2017 – 56 С. (репринт, 1908). (in Russian) on line
- K.A. Semenov / Семенов К.А. Преславное Знамение. К трехсотлетнему юбилею Великого освящения храма Знамения Пресвятой Богородицы в селе Дубровицы 1704–2004. // Подольск.: ОАО «Типография «Новости», 2004. – С. 94. (in Russian).
- K.A. Semenov / Семенов К.А. Усадьба Дубровицы. Церковь Знамения: Памятники исторической мысли. // М.: Подольскпромкомбанк, 2006. – 239 С.: ил., портр., факс., цв. ил. ISBN 5-88451-195-7. (in Russian).
- M.V. Krasovsky (journal) / Красовский М.В. Церковь с. Дубровиц // Известия Императорской Археологической Комиссии.: журнал. — 1910. — Вып. 34. — С. 55–71. (in Russian) on line
- Orthodox churches (journal) / Рождение шедевра. «Силою благочестия движим ...»". // Православные храмы. Путешествие по святым местам.: журнал. – 2014. – № 92. – 31 С. (in Russian).
- S.K. Makovsky (journal) / Маковский С.К. Две подмосковные князя С. М. Голицына // Старые годы.: журнал. – 1910. – Вып. 1. – С. 31-37. (in Russian)
- V.A. Potseluev, I.V. Petreev / Поцелуев В.А., Петреев И.В. Подольск и окрестности. Подольск "На берегах Пахры". // М.: Терра-спорт, 1999. – 553 С.: ил., карт., портр. – ISBN 5-93127-041-8. (in Russian).
