= Mamonov =

Mamonov (Russian: Мамонов) is a Russian masculine surname, its feminine counterpart is Mamonova. It may refer to:

- Aleksei Mamonov (born 1993), Russian football player
- Alexander Dmitriev-Mamonov (1758–1803), Russian noble
- Anton Mamonov (born 1989), Russian football player
- Dmitriy Mamonov (born 1978), Kazakhstani football manager and a former player
- Matvey Dmitriev-Mamonov (1790–1863), Russian noble and writer, son of Alexander
- Nikolay Mamonov, Soviet speedskater
- Pyotr Mamonov (1951–2021), Russian rock musician
- Tatiana Mamonova, Russian feminist
- Vladimirs Mamonovs (born 1980), Latvian ice hockey player
- Yuri Mamonov (1958–2022), Russian politician
