= Dmitriev-Mamonov =

Dmitriev-Mamonov (Russian: Дмитриев-Мамонов) is a Russian masculine surname that may refer to

- Alexander Dmitriev-Mamonov (1758–1803), Russian noble
- Matvey Dmitriev-Mamonov (1790–1863), Russian noble and writer, son of Alexander
- Alexander Ivanovich Dmitriev-Mamonov (1787–1836), Russian military commander and battle painter, father of Emmanuil
- Emmanuil Dmitriev-Mamonov (1824–1883), Russian portrait painter and Slavophile
