= Malushev's House =

- Дом Малышева
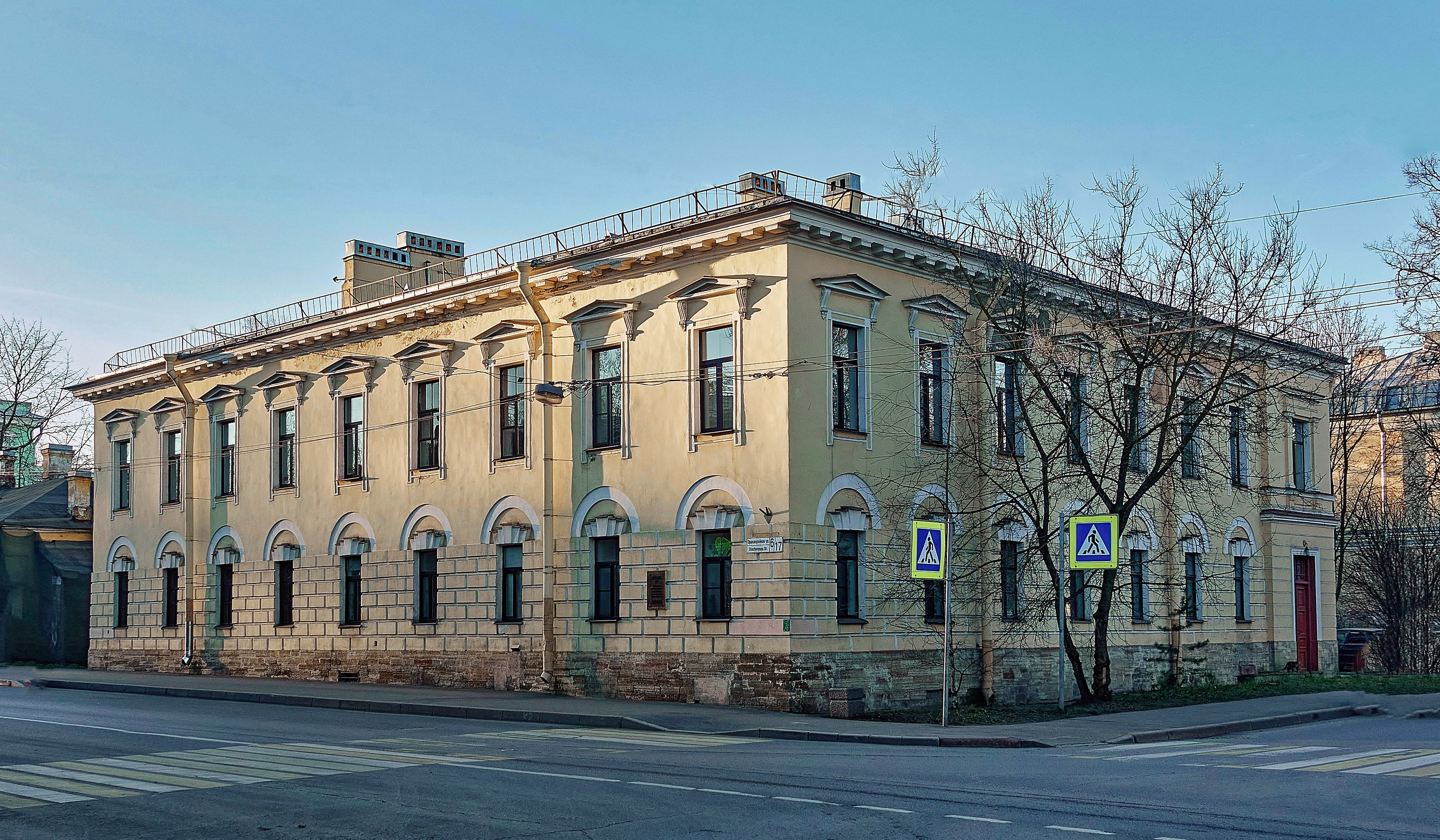
- Malushev's House

General information
- Architectural style: Classicism
- Location: Pushkin, 17/16 Oranzherejnaya Street
- Coordinates: 59°43′00″N 30°24′16″E
- Construction started: 1822
- Completed: 1825

Design and construction
- Architect: V. P. Stasov

Malushev's House is a building of the historical significance in Pushkin, Saint Petersburg. It was built in the period of 1822–1825. Nowadays it is an object of cultural heritage. The building is located on 17/16 Oranzherejnaya Street, and faces Sobornaya Square.

== History ==
The project of the building belonged to the architect V.P. Stasov. At the same time he was busy building the neighboring Great Greenhouse. In 1840 there was a tavern on the first floor of the house. In 1858 the owner of the house was Alexander Ivanovich Malyshev, the merchant. The house was named after him.

Later, the house belonged to the Palace Administration. The palace employees lived there. In the 1870s architectural replanning of the house was made: a new front door, a staircase and a wing along the Greenhouse street (modern address: 4 Oranzherejnaya Street) were built. During the period from 1896 to 1920, on the first floor where were seven rooms, two of which were used for the office, lived the architect of the Palace of Management, Silvio Danini. Half of the second floor was reserved for the priest of the palace Znamenskaya Church. After the October Revolution the house was re-developed. The number of apartments was increased. The building still remains residential.

== Architecture ==
The building is valuable as an example of the town planning decision of V.P. Stasov for the design of the street corner. The style of the building is late classicism. It is in harmony with the appearance of the Great Greenhouse. Along the Greenhouse street, both buildings had the same type of stone fence. The house has a L-shaped form, two floors, stands on a high basement. The first floor is finished with a large rust, while the window openings are recessed deep into the wall. The second-floor windows are decorated with sandricks. The building is crowned with a cornice with modulons.
