= Boris Alekseyevich Golitsyn =

Russian politician

Boyar Boris Alekseyevich Golitsyn
- Russian: Борис Алексеевич Голицын
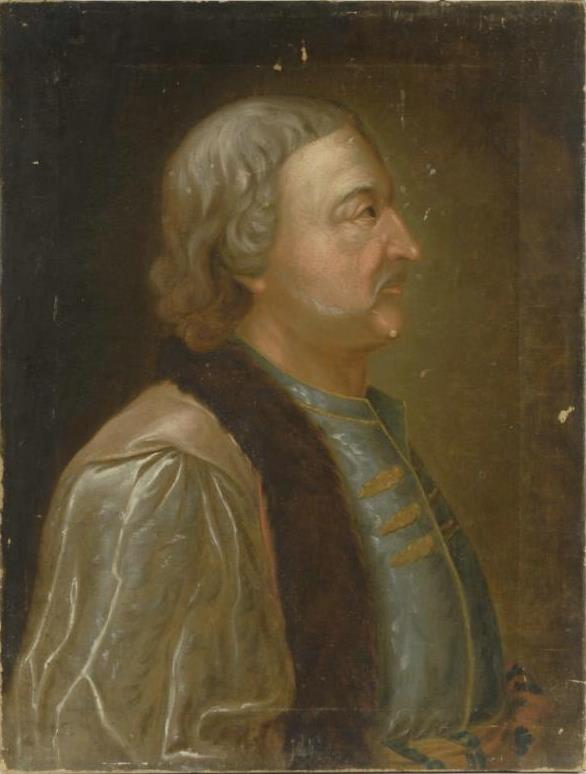
- Portrait by Stepan Alexandrovsky

Head of the Kazan Prikaz
- In office 1683–1708
- Preceded by: Yakov Nikitich Odoevsky
- Succeeded by: Prikaz was abolished in 1708

Personal details
- Born: 30 July [O.S. 20 July] 1654 Tsardom of Russia
- Died: 29 October [O.S. 18 October] 1714 (aged 60) Monastery "Florishcheva Pustyn", Kazan province, Tsardom of Russia
- Children: 10

Boyar Boris Alexeyevich Golitsyn (surname sometimes transcribed Galitzin, Russian: Голи́цын, romanized: Golitsyn, IPA: [ɡɐˈlʲitsɨn]; 1654–1714) was a Russian politician of the noble Golitsyn family. His chief political opponent was his own cousin Prince Vasily Vasilyevich Golitsyn.

== Life ==
Boris was a court chamberlain since 1676. He was the young tsar Peter the Great's tutor and chief supporter when, in 1689, Peter resisted the usurpations of his elder half sister Sophia, and the head of the loyal council which assembled at the Trinity monastery during the crisis of the struggle. It was Golitsyn who suggested taking refuge in that strong fortress and won over the boyars of the opposite party.

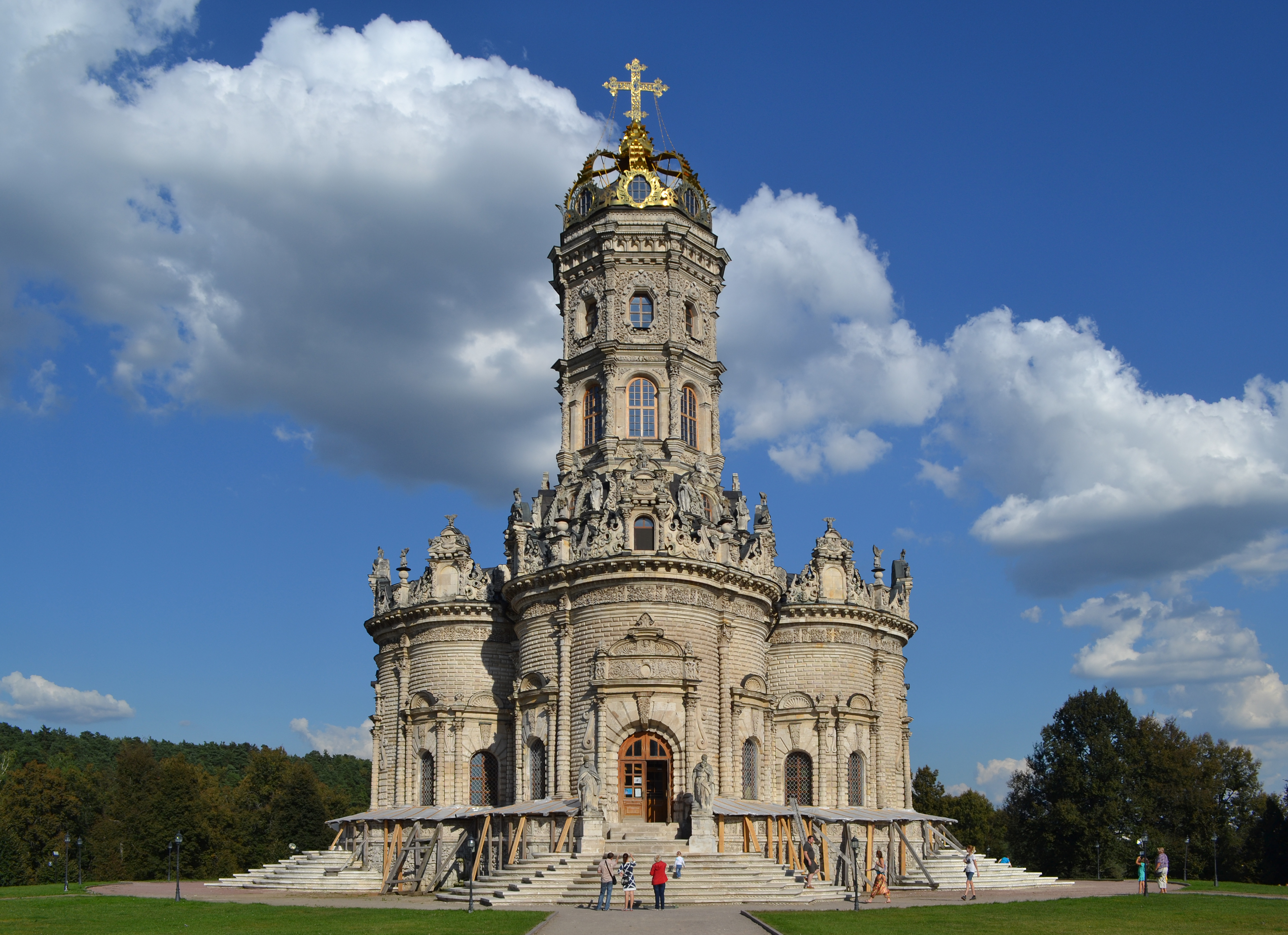
The church in Dubrovitsy. The political views of Prince Boris Golitsyn were reflected in the pro-Western architecture of his estate Dubrovitsy

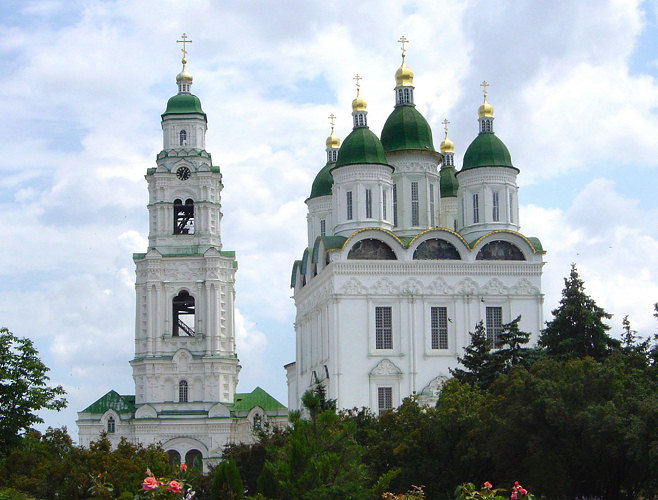
Astrakhan Cathedral, built at the urging of Boris Golitsyn in 1700–1710

In 1690 he was created a boyar and shared with Lev Naryshkin, Peter's uncle, the conduct of home affairs. After the death of the tsaritsa Natalia, Peter's mother, in 1694, his influence increased still further. The estate Bolshiye Vyazyomy was given to him; since then Vyazyomy remained the ancestral estate of the Golitsyns, although Boris rarely came to Vyazyomy preferring to live at the Dubrovitsy estate (near Podolsk), which came from his wife's family. From 1690 to 1704, in the Dubrovitsy estate, he led the construction of a stone Church of the Theotokos of the Sign. His son Vasily (1681-1710) inherited the estate.

He accompanied Peter to the White Sea (1694–1695); he took part in the Azov campaign (1695); and was one of the triumvirate who ruled Russia during Peters first foreign tour (1697–1698) to Holland and England. The Astrakhan rebellion (1706), which affected all the districts under his government, shook Peter's confidence in him, and seriously impaired his position. In 1707 he was superseded in the Volgan provinces by Andrei Matveev. A year before his death he entered a monastery.

As was common in late 17th century Russia, Golitsyn supported Westernism. In many respects he was regarded as in advance of his time. He was well educated, spoke Latinfluently, frequented the society of scholars and had his children educated according to European models. Yet his frequent drunkenness and perceived rudeness by intruding the hospitality of wealthy foreigners lost him the respect Peter the Great, despite his previous services.

The Polish diplomat Foy de la Neuville visited Moscow at the end of 1689 and hosted a banquet for two Russian nobles, Golitsyn and Matveev, who had long wanted to try French roast. Both nobles were so pleased with this meal that they sent several plates to their wives. Three days after this banquet, Matveev invited Foy de la Neuville to dine at his house, where Neuville was received with great dignity.
