= Matvey Dmitriev-Mamonov =

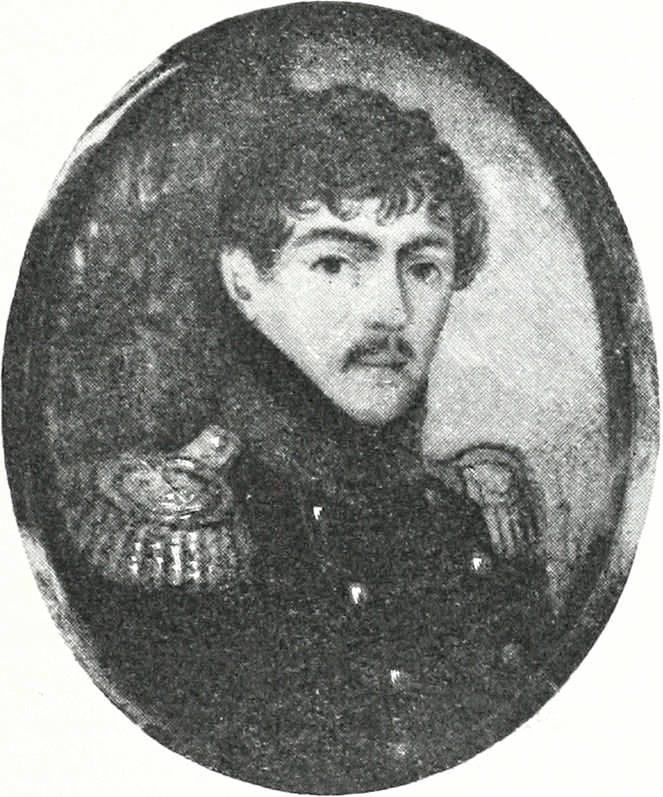

Count Matvey Alexandrovich Dmitriev-Mamonov (Russian: Матвей Александрович Дмитриев-Мамонов; 25 September [O.S. 14 September] 1790 in Moscow – 23 June [O.S. 12 June] 1863 at Vassilyevskoye manor, today within the city borders of Moscow) - was a Russian figure of public life and writer, organiser and chief of the Mamonov regiment during the Napoleonic wars, major general (1813), and founder of the pre-Decembrist Russian Order of Chivalry. He held a considerable estate, including the manor Dubrovitsy near Moscow. In 1825 he refused the oath to Tsar Nicholas I and was declared insane. For the rest of his life he stood under trusteeship at Vassilyevskoye manor, which became known as Mamonov's Dacha.

== Biography ==
=== Youth. Literary production ===
His father was Count A.M. Dmitriev-Mamonov - Adjutant General and a lover of Catherine II. His mother was Princess Darja Fjedorovna Shsherbatova. He was one of the richest landowners in Russia (in 1860 he held manors with 90,000 desyatinas in 10 provinces and 29 counties, 15,000 male serfs, more than 200,000 rubles in state papers, valuables worth more than 200,000 rubles, real estate in Moscow, Saint Petersburg, and elsewhere).

He was educated at home. In 1807 he was promoted kammerjunker; effective 9/21 April 1811, due to the patronage of the then minister of justice I.I. Dmitriev, he was ober-procurator of the 6. (Moscow) criminal department of the Senate. During these years he befriended Moscow freemasons, especially M.I. Nevzorov and N.I. Novikov, and quickly rose through the ranks, in 1807 being already Grand Master. Throughout the years 1811 to 1812 he published a cycle of poems in Nevsorov's journal "Friend of the Youth" ("Друг юношества"), influenced by the poetry of Bobrov and Derzhavin. In his literary work he joined the opponents of Karamzin - the so-called "archaists". He also studied the Pugaschev riots.

=== Military service ===
At the beginning of the Great Patriotic War of 1812 he made a speech before the members of the Moscow nobility which left an epic impression. The text has not been preserved, though Pushkin later dubbed it "immortal". Mamonov offered the government to use his whole income for the war effort keeping back just 10,000 rubles a year for his personal use; further, he also offered to mobilise his serfs. The tsar thanked him for his offer and suggested he raise a cavalry regiment within the Moscow militia.

On 23 July/4 August 1812 he entered the Moscow militia and participated in the battles at Borodino, Tarutinsk, and Malojaroslavets. The raising of the regiment, which was called after its chief 1st Mounted Cossack Regiment Count M.A. Dmitriev-Mamonov, went on only sluggishly, though the popular cavalry colonel Prince B.A. Svjatopolk-Tshetvertinsky had been named its commander. The regiment consisted in part of the count's serfs, but in part also of volunteers. The officers belonged to the Moscow court nobility. Among them was Prince P.A. Vyazemsky, who later wrote of these times:

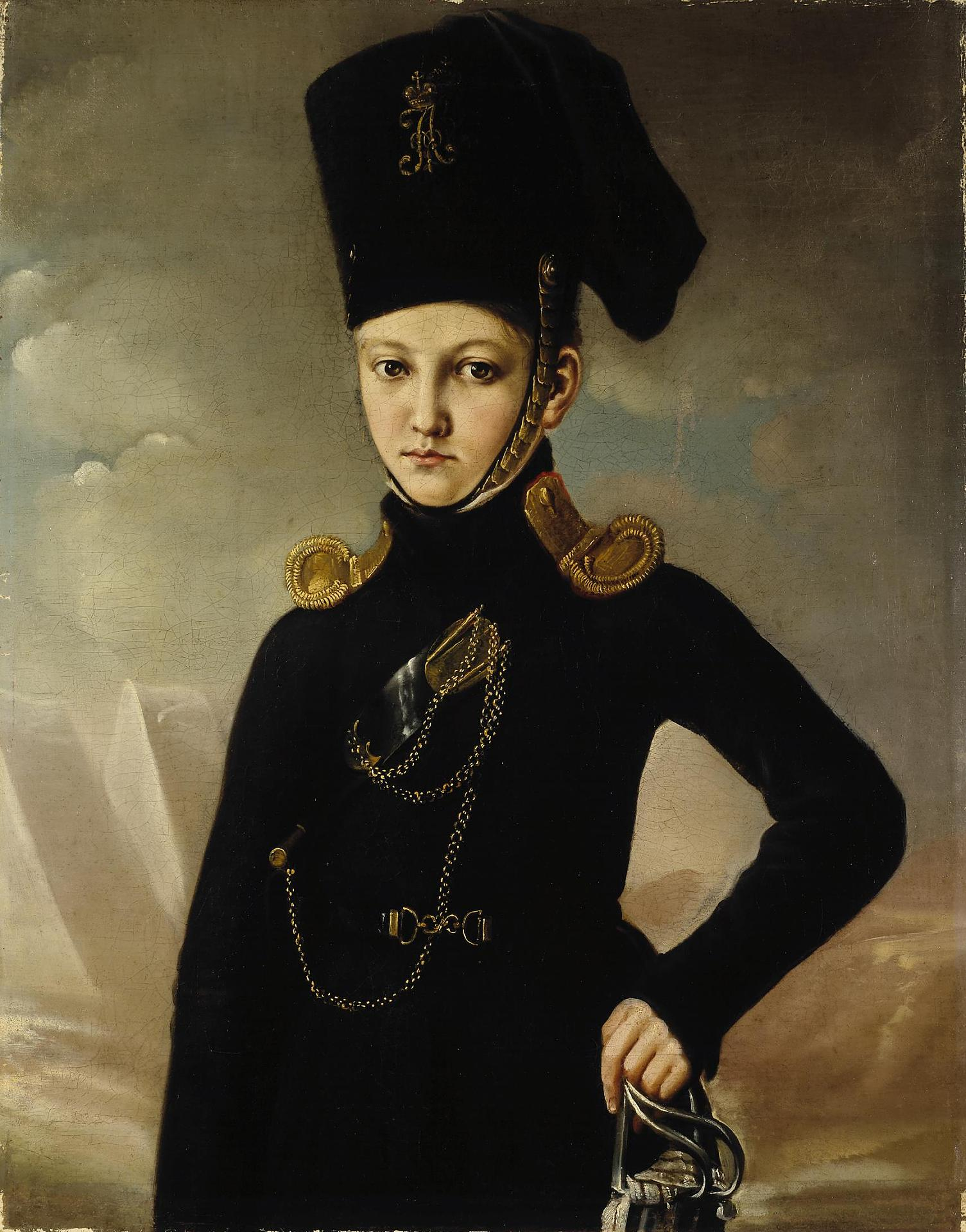
A Cossack of the Mamonov regiment

Рифмы прочь, и перья в папку,
И долой мой модный фрак,
Я надел медвежью шапку,
Я мамоновский казак.

Away with rimes, quill pen into the portfolio,
and down with my dapper dress-coat,
I wear a bearskin,
I am a Mamonov cossack.

On 19/31 August the regiment comprised 56 commissioned officers, 59 petty officers, and 186 men, but had only 81 horses. Though the regiment had no part in any battles, it was used to keep up law and order during the army's retreat from Moscow and the crossing of the Moskva River at the Dorogomilovsky gate. Dmitriev-Mamonov himself was awarded for his courage at Tarutinsk and Malojaroslavl the "golden sword for courage".

As a consequence of the regiment's redeployment at Yaroslavl province, the loss of the ammunition bought at Moscow, and the pillage of Mamonov's villages the raising of the regiment was further delayed. At the beginning of January 1813 ten squadrons contained 60 commissioned officers, 96 petty officers, and 389 cossacks.

On 12/24 March 1813 the First Cossack Regiment was reorganised into the Uhlan Regiment Count M.A. Mamonov, with 6 squadrons; he himself was made its chief and promoted major-general. In April the regiment was redeployed at Serpukhov, but during the summer it saw action. "The count was always conceited, but these accolades brought him over the brink. Furthermore he was never trained as a soldier and did not possess any of the necessary skills to lead a regiment. Irregularities and misunderstandings occurred. Even before the final deployment of the regiment he fought a duel with one of his staff officers, probably Tolbuchin", Prince Vyazemsky observed.

In 1814 the regiment saw action and reached Fort-Louis in France. The regiment leader in his youthful inexperience failed to uphold the discipline among his men (already at the deployment of the regiment at Yaroslavl his cossacks had been nicknamed "Mamay" boys" instead of "Mamonov’s boys", and due to rioting an inquiry had been opened at Serpukhov); clashes with the Austrian allies and the local population occurred; a German village was burned down. On 27 August/8 September 1814 the Mamonov regiment was dispersed, he himself transferred to be the commander of the First Cavalry Corps under general F.P. Uvarov. After the cessation of hostilities he was with the commander of the Second Mounted Jäger Division. On 2/14 March 1816 he applied for discharge after a conflict with Tsar Alexander I, to whom he wrote a critical letter on the circumstances of his regiment's dissolution (officially he sought discharge for health reasons).

=== Social-political activity ===
In 1812 he established the Russian Order of Chivalry, at first a purely free-masonic institution, which, however, during the years 1814/15 under the influence of M.F. Orlov turned into one of the first pre-Decembrist organisations. He put up program documents for the order, in 1816 printing the pamphlet "Short Instruction for Russian Knights" on the premises of the Typographic Institute of the Moscow Imperial Medico-Surgical academy with a run of 25 copies (in French; one copy of the Russian original has been preserved). Mamonov's constitutional projects were published in 1906 by А. K. Borosdin. They provided among other things for the abolition of serfdom and the transformation of Russia into an aristocratic republic with a bicameral parliament (with a chamber of lords and chamber of deputies). One of the order's objectives was "to deprive all foreigners of any influence on the state affairs" and "the final overthrow, possibly the death of all foreigners holding office". As a foreigner, however, "must be regarded within the Order also the greatgrandson of a foreigner, whose forebears from great-grandfather down to the father belonged to the Greco-Russian faith, served the throne of Russia and upheld their nationality without ever leaving Russia". This instruction was directed against Alexander I, who in Mamonov's opinion was a foreigner (para. 53 of the Instruction), being the great-grandson of the Holsteinian Peter III and furthermore often absent from Russia. As a means of the transformation the count proposed a military uprising.

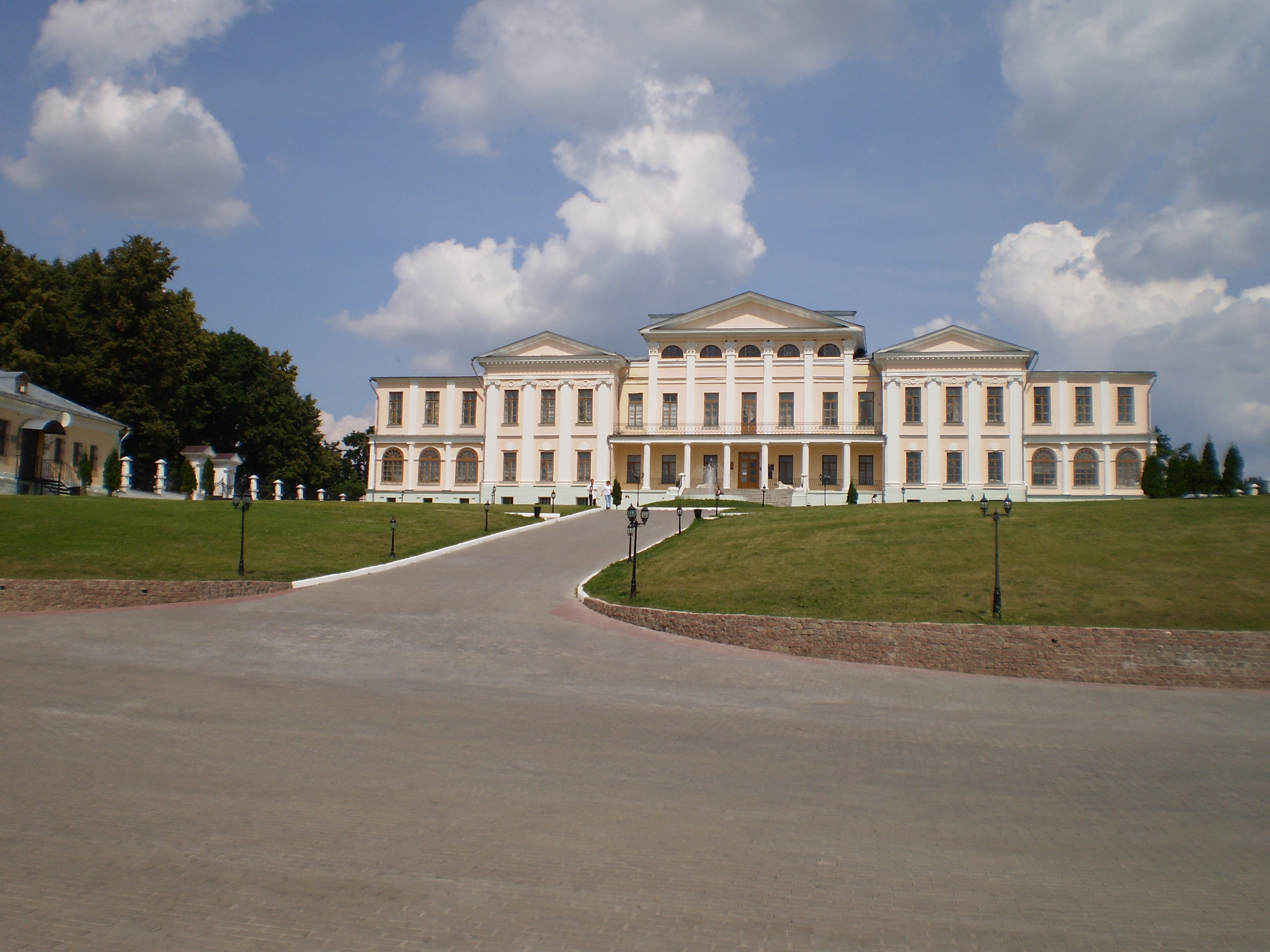
Dubrovitsy manor, where the count lived in total seclusion

After his return from abroad in 1817 he retired to his manor near Moscow, where he lived until 1823 in perfect seclusion, only seldom venturing into town:

"During some years he saw not even one of his servants. All he needed was kept within a separate room; there, too, he left his written instructions. The walls of his bedroom were decorated with strange pictures with cabbalistic, but also erotic scenes".

In the opinion of contemporary historians the count showed signs of mental disturbance already in 1817, such as a proclivity to a secluded lifestyle, growing a beard, and wearing "Russian garb". Modern scientists, especially J.M. Lotman, hold that an extravagant lifestyle of that kind as such cannot be construed as proof of mental weakness. Contemporaries and memorialists agree, that the count was of highly egocentric, proud, and irascible temperament, at all times emphasised his ancient noble lineage, and never thought it necessary to exercise restraint in writing to superiors. Furthermore, Mamonov was quite close to members of secret societies; M.F. Orlov visited him repeatedly in his manor. All that disturbed those in power, further incited by the information of M.K. Gribovsky on the activities of secret societies. Since the beginning of the 1820s, the count was under observation by the secret police.

Emphasising his own independence he erected on his estate at Dubrovitsy, 35 versts from Moscow, at the confluence of the Desna and Pakhra rivers, a true fortress with ordnance and a detachment of troops levied from his serfs. In his open contempt for the Romanovs and their claim to the Russian throne, which he considered void, he kept in his home the banner of Prince D.M. Pozharsky and the bloodstained shirt of the tsarevich Dimitri Ivanovich - the ultimate symbol of the Rurik dynasty.

Though they did not wear a princely title, the Dmitriev-Mamonovs were not therefore less proud of their descent from Vladimir Monomakh. The awareness of their Rurikid lineage was already in the 1850s present in the mind of one of the members of the Dmitriev family (a younger branch), the publicist M.A. Dmitriev, a nephew of the renowned poet I.I. Dmitriev. He wrote in his memoirs:

"We derive directly from Vladimir Monomach, and this in the male line, not in the female line, like the Romanovs - these pseudo issue of our ruling family, who are not even Romanovs, but are derived from the Holsteins".

=== Arrest and Stultification ===
In 1823 the count's valet died, and a new one was employed, the freedman, citizen Nikanor Afanassjev, a former serf of Prince P.M. Volkonsky, the Chief of the General Staff and one of the leaders of the political police, who had already been the recipient of Gribovsky's denunciation in 1822. In that denunciation he informed him on the unexpected reactivation of the Russian Order of Chivalry "long since deemed defunct" and openly named Mamonov. According to the son of the teacher of Russian literature in the Mamonov household, P. Kicheyev - the new valet rather than fulfilling his role as servant spied upon the count. As he suspected him to be a government agent, the count ordered him flogged. The victim turned to the Moscow Military Governor, Prince D.V. Golitsyn who immediately sent his adjutant to Dubrovitsy. When Mamonov sent him packing, gendarmes and soldiers appeared in the village, arresting the count.

From that point onwards Alexander I and Arakcheyev took matters in hand personally. As Prince Vyazemsky reports: "he was charged with irregularities in the management of the estate, namely oppression of the peasants not as an absentee landlord, but by the actual management". By imperial prescript Mamonov was placed under house arrest in his Moscow residence. Mamonov answered to D.V. Golitsyn’s threat to put him under trusteeship, with a furious letter, notably stating:

…You are not empowered to put me under trusteeship and will not dare to do so, for I am neither under age nor insane, as I do not hesitate to submit serfs living in my house to corporal punishment, when in my opinion they deserve it: for the right to flog one’s serfs is immanent to Russian private and public law as handed down to us by our forebears. (…) Your Illustrious Highness must be aware, also in your capacity as citizen of legal age, that you are not allowed to threaten another citizen of legal age and imperial dignitary; and how dare you write something like this to me, a man who is in every respect - with the exception of the Table of Ranks - your superior!

At the end of his message Mamonov declared himself ready to sort out matters with the governor by a duel. On 28 February he wrote to his old patron I.I. Dmitriev asking him to act as mediator, but he had been in retirement for years and could not help him.

A medical commission appointed by D.V. Golitsyn declared the count insane. On Golitsyn's request the cabinet decided on 23 June/5 July to put him under trusteeship. According to all accounts Dmitriev-Mamonov was an ordinary snob, eccentric and frondeur, but the government was apprehensive that the combined influence of his money, of his ties to conspirators in secret societies and Orlov’s options, who after all was in command of a division, might be sufficient to trigger an insurgency or even a coup d’état.

During the Decembrist riots of 1825 the count, held hitherto in Moscow under arrest as suspect but not as insane, refused the oath of allegiance to tsar Nicholas I. From that point onwards cruel "cures" were applied, aimed at either making him relent or to drive him insane. A relative and one of his last trustees, N.A. Dmitriev-Mamonov, reports, that for the first time he was treated harshly and cruelly, proof of which are the straight jackets and strappings which I found thirty years ago with which he was tied to his bed, whereas P. Kischeyev states, that the treatment began by pouring cold water over his head which of course drove the count raving mad.

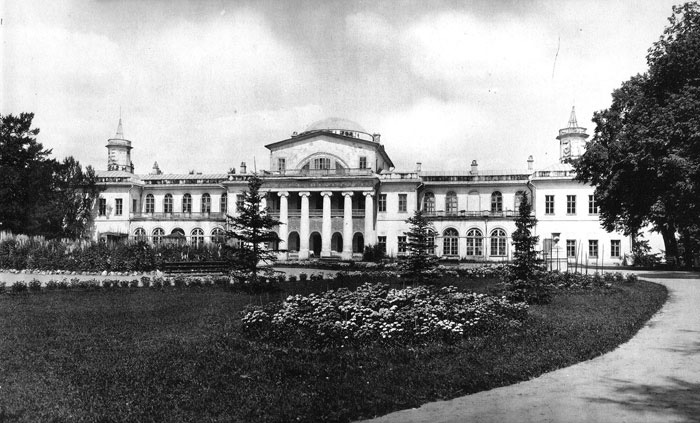
The Mamonov Dacha, where the Count lived for the last 30 years of his life in total seclusion, in 1913. He was not even allowed to visit the gardens.

Since 1830 Mamonov was kept in strict isolation at Vassilyevskoye manor at Sparrow Hills, which had been purchased from Prince Yusupov. In consequence of the long detention there of Count Mamonov it was named "Mamonovian Dacha" by the Muscovites. "Treatment" and abuse by the turnkeys did not remain without effect: People, who met the count during the 1840-1860 period, remember him as a lunatic suffering from delusions of persecution and grandeur. He died from gangrene caused by the constant wear of perfumed shirts. He was buried at the Donskoy Monastery at Moscow. With him the (first) comital line of the house of Dmitriev-Mamonov expired.

== Literary aftermath ==
Lina Steiner sees Mamonov as one of the models for Pierre Bezukhov in Tolstoy’s War and Peace.

== Awards ==
- Order of St. Vladimir 4. class
- Order of St. Anna 2. class
- Golden Sword "for courage" (21.12.1812)

== Works ==
- Poems - in: Poets of the period 1790 through 1810 (Стихотворения // Поэты 1790—1810-х гг. — Л., 1971.)
- Review of the present state of Russia and the plans for future restructuring - in: From the Letters and Testimonials of the Decembrists (Критика современного состояния России и планы будущего устройства // Из писем и показаний декабристов. — СПб, 1906. — С. 145—257.)
- Remarks on Castèra's book - in: Russian Archive (По поводу книги Кастеры // Русский архив. — 1877. — Книга 3.)
