= Pakhra =

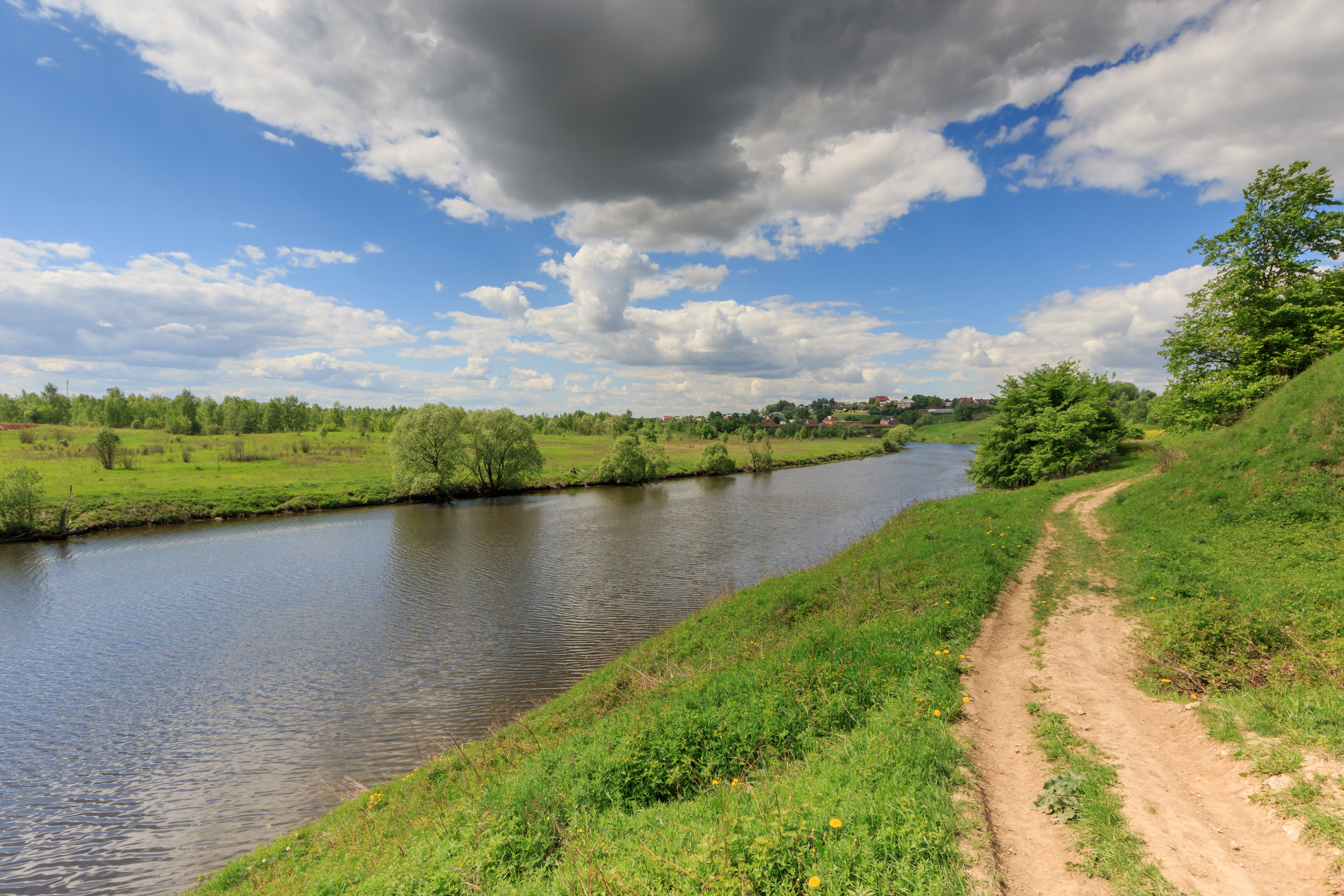
- The Pakhra near Gorki Leninskiye
- Native name: Пахра (Russian)

Location
- Country: Russia

Physical characteristics
- Mouth: Moskva
  - coordinates: 55.5377°N 37.9907°E
- Length: 135 km (84 mi)
- Basin size: 2,580 km^{2} (1,000 sq mi)

Basin features
- Progression: Moskva→ Oka→ Volga→ Caspian Sea

The Pakhra (Russian: Пахра́) is a river in Moscow Oblast and the city of Moscow, Russia, a right tributary of the Moskva. It is 135 km in length. The area of its basin is 2580 km^{2}. The Pakhra River freezes up in November–December and stays under the ice until the late March–April. Main tributaries: Mocha and Desna. Gorki Leninskiye and Podolsk stand on the Pakhra River.
