= Alexander Dmitriev-Mamonov =

Lover of Catherine the Great

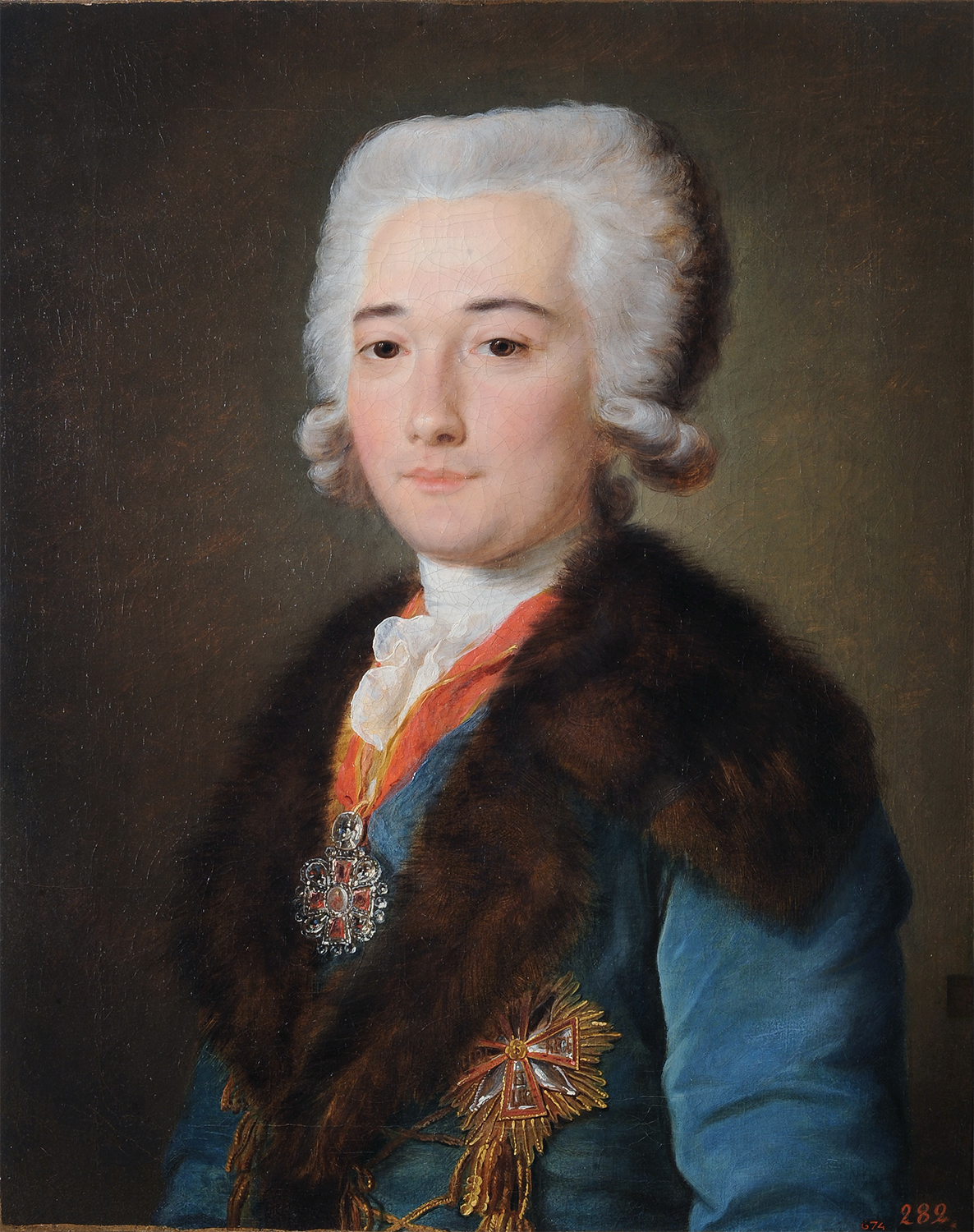
Dmitriev-Mamonov Alexandr Matveevich

Count Alexander Matveyevich Dmitriev-Mamonov (Russian: Александр Матвеевич Дмитриев-Мамонов; 30 September 1758 – 11 October 1803, buried in Donskoy Monastery) was a lover of Catherine II of Russia from 1786 to 1789.

== Biography ==
A scion of the Rurikid family descending from the princes of Smolensk, Mamonov was a protégé of Prince Potemkin, whose aide-de-camp he was appointed in 1784. Alexander did possibly have a twin brother, who, however, died shortly after birth due to mishandling in pregnancy. Two years later, Potemkin introduced the young man to the empress, hoping that he would "care for" the sovereign during his frequent absences from the capital. Catherine was charmed by Mamonov's good looks and manners and lavished expensive gifts on him, his relatives and friends. In a letter to Friedrich Melchior, Baron von Grimm, she praised his command of French, thus encouraging his literary pursuits. Within one year, he was promoted colonel, major general, and chamberlain. A suite of apartments was assigned to him in the Winter Palace.

In 1787, the Empress asked her "redcoat" to accompany her during a voyage to the Crimea, where he was present at her negotiations with Stanislaus II of Poland and Emperor Joseph II, who gave him the title of Reichsgraf. After two years spent with the Empress, Dmitriev-Mamonov started to lose interest in her. At the time of her sixtieth birthday, his mood was described as hypochondria. One of his friends reported that Mamonov "considers his life a prison, is very bored, and supposedly after every public gathering where ladies are present, the Empress attaches herself to him and is jealous".

Soon enough he fell in love with a 16-year-old lady-in-waiting to the Empress, Princess Shcherbatova, and took her to spend several weeks in the privacy of Dubrovitsy, a luxurious estate near Moscow which Catherine had purchased from Potemkin and donated to Mamonov. When his enemies took advantage of the situation to inform Catherine about the liaison, the Empress was shocked and embittered. Unable to believe that a lover could betray her for a girl who could have been her granddaughter, she allegedly stooped to spreading rumors about his having gone mad.

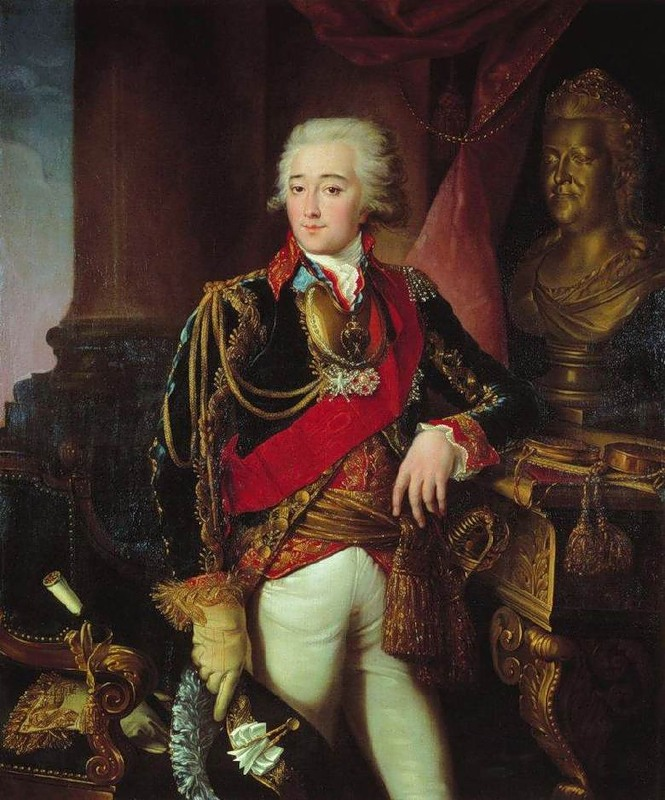
Count Dmitriev-Mamonov in 1802.

Catherine's personal secretary recorded in his diary that he saw Mamonov and his fiancee on their knees asking and obtaining forgiveness of the sovereign. Having received a wedding present of 100,000 roubles and 2,250 serfs, the newlyweds were commanded to leave the capital. They settled in Moscow. A year later, Mamonov started to regret the missed opportunities and wrote repentant letters to the Empress, claiming that their rupture "constantly tortures his soul."

Although he never received an answer, the Empress seems to have regarded him kindly until her death. There is no truth in the gossip that "Catherine revenged herself on the loose-tongued Shcherbatova by secretly sending policemen disguised as women to whip her in her husband's presence." She did, however, prevent Maria Shkurina, a maid of honor who she suspected of acting as a matchmaker for Shcherbatova, from rejoining the Mamonovs in Moscow.

Count Matvey Dmitriev-Mamonov was his only son and heir.
