= Fresh Wind. Volga =

1891–1895 painting by Isaac Levitan

- Свежий ветер. Волга (Russian)
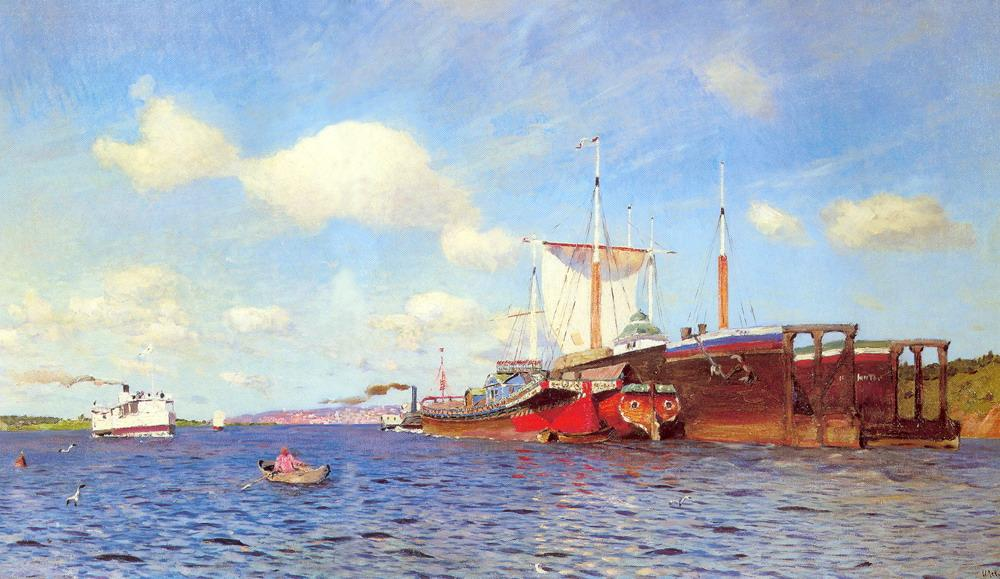
- Artist: Isaac Levitan
- Year: 1891–1895
- Medium: Oil on canvas
- Dimensions: 72 cm × 123 cm (28 in × 48 in)
- Location: Tretyakov Gallery, Moscow

Fresh Wind. Volga (Note: The painting is also sometimes translated as Fresh Wind. The Volga) (Russian: Свежий ветер. Волга, romanized: Svezhiy veter. Volga) is an oil painting by the Russian artist Isaac Levitan made between 1891 and 1895. The painting depicts the Volga river in central Russia. It has been housed in Moscow's Tretyakov Gallery since 1910.

Levitan worked on the painting for four years, beginning in 1891 and finishing in 1895. A year later, it was displayed at the Society for Travelling Art Exhibitions' 24th exhibition in Saint Petersburg and was purchased by Russian art collector Mikhail Morozov that same year. In accordance with Morozov's will, the painting was transferred to the Tretyakov Gallery in 1910.

Fresh Wind. Volga is part of a series of joyous works depicting nature that Levitan made between 1895 and 1897, which also includes the paintings March (1895), Golden Autumn (1895), Spring. High water (1897), and others. The artwork, according to art historian Aleksei Fedorov-Davydov, conveys a "festive image of life," and in it "everything is full of life". The artist Mikhail Nesterov said of the painting that "Perhaps no picture, except for Ilya Repin's Barge Haulers on the Volga, gives such a vivid, accurate description of the Volga."

== History ==
Between 1887 and 1891, Isaac Levitan visited the Volga four years in a row. The artist's first impression of the river was disappointment; in 1887, he wrote to his friend, the playwright Anton Chekhov: "I was expecting the Volga to be a source of strong artistic impressions, but instead, the river seemed so dreary and dead that my heart ached and I thought, 'why don't I go back?'" However, the river eventually grew on Levitan. He created paintings such as Evening on the Volga (1888), Evening. Golden Plyos (1889), After the Rain. Plyos (1889) based on his impressions of Volga. Fresh Wind. Volga is part of a series of joyous works depicting nature that Levitan made between 1895 and 1897, which also include the paintings March (1895), Golden Autumn (1895), Spring. High water (1897) and others.

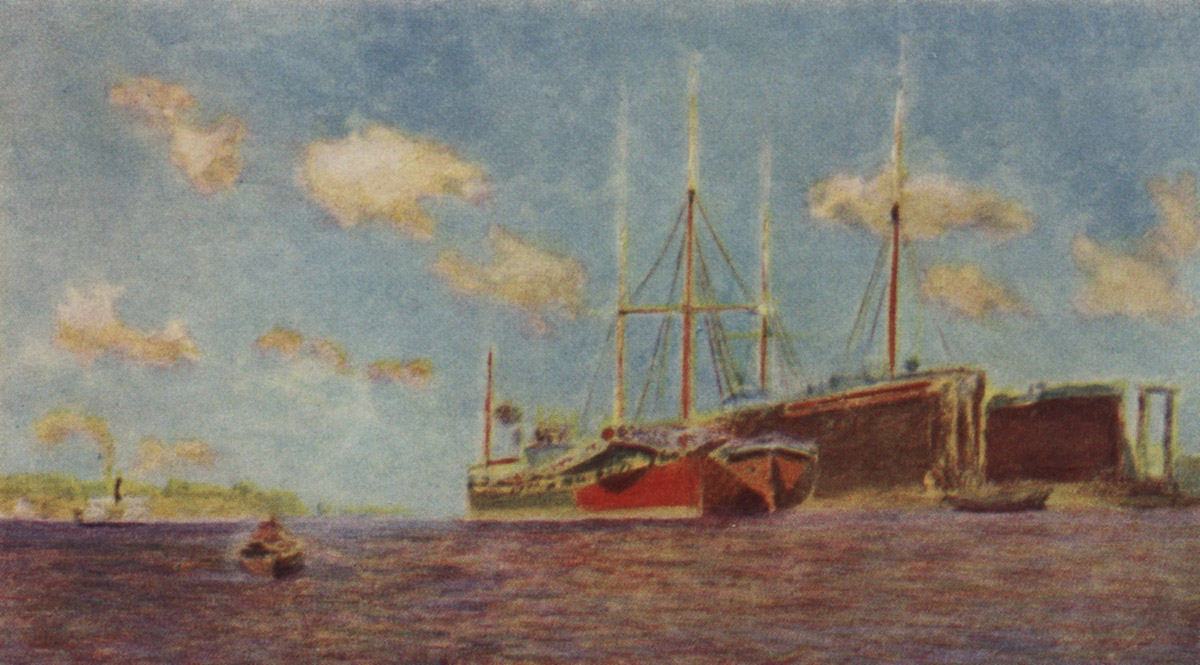
Fresh Wind. Volga (9 × 16 cm, 1890)

Levitan spent the summer and autumn of 1890 travelling along the Volga, visiting the towns of Plyos, Yuryevets and Kineshma. Sofia Kuvshinnikova, a Russian landscape artist and Levitan's friend, accompanied him on the trip. It is believed that the idea for Fresh Wind. Volga occurred to Levitan during his 1890 trip to Plyos (according to some sources, it happened during a trip from Plyos to Rybinsk).

Levitan began working on the artwork in 1891, as evidenced by the half-erased original date "91" in the artist's signature, which was later replaced by "95", the year he completed it. The painting also contains repeated changes to the original paint layer as a result of Levitan's years of work on it.

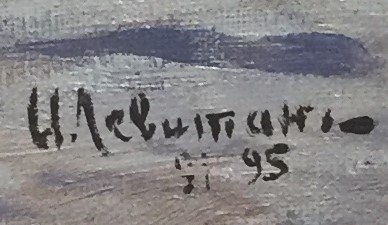
Levitan's signature on Fresh Wind. Volga (date "91" half-erased and replaced by "95")

Fresh Wind. Volga was exhibited at the Society for Travelling Art Exhibitions' 24th exhibition in Saint Petersburg on 11 February 1896 under the title Volga, Windy, alongside nine of Levitan's other works, including March, Golden Autumn, and others. Fresh Wind. Volga was relocated to Moscow for the second part of the exhibition the same year. Some sources claim that the painting was not displayed during the Moscow exhibition, while others claim that it was and that it was here that Russian collector Mikhail Morozov saw and purchased it. The work was also shown at the All-Russia Exhibition in Nizhny Novgorod in 1896.

Mikhail Morozov died in 1903. Morozov's widow Margarita Morozova transferred part of his collection, including Fresh Wind. Volga, to the Tretyakov Gallery seven years later, in 1910, in accordance with his will.

== Description ==
The painting depicts the Volga river on a sunny windy day. A blue sky with light clouds runs across the sky above the river, and white gulls fly low above the water. In the right foreground, there are self-propelled barges with large masts being driven by a tugboat, one of which has a large white sail fluttering. One of the barges has a Russian flag, while the other has a Persian flag. According to art critic Sofia Prorokova, the two flags represent the Volga River, which connects the East with Russia via the Caspian Sea. A white passenger steamship is approaching the barges. Streaks of steam are stretching from the tugboat and steamer's chimneys, indicating that the ships are exchanging horns. A boat with a lone rower is also visible in the foreground, and a city can be seen in the distance in the background.

The painting employs bright, resonant colours and thick impasto. The group of barges contains a diverse range of browns in various shades, ranging from greenish-brown to bright red. Resonant colours are used in the depiction of the river's waters, with dark patches of shadows from the waves and mauve reflections, including reflections of barges and sails. Against the background of the water, a white steamer and a yellowish boat with a single rower wearing a pink shirt stand out. The beaches have green and sandy tones, and the clouds have pinkish-purple hues. According to the art historian Aleksei Fedorov-Davydov, Fresh Wind. Volga has "the same bright and definite brilliance, the same colour brilliance and subtle development with a clear designation of each colour as in Golden Autumn; the same colour construction based on warm and cold tonal combinations and contrasts."

Details of Fresh Wind. Volga

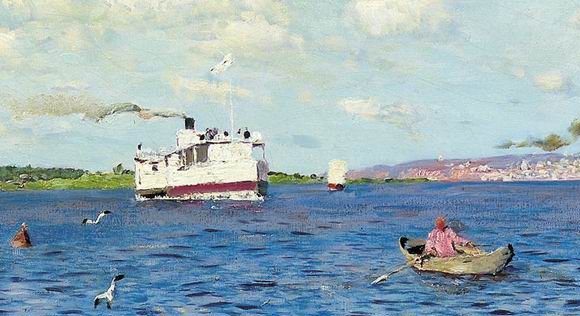

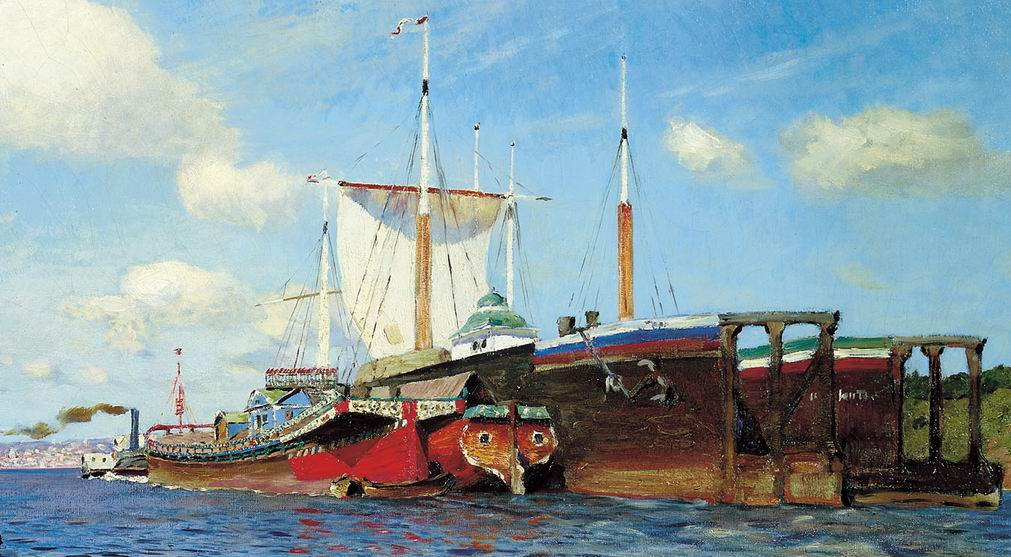

== Sketches ==
In 1890, Levitan created a small oil on wood sketch of Fresh Wind. Volga. The sketch outlined the main ideas for the painting. According to Aleksei Fedorov-Davydov, in the final version, Levitan "only streamlined the composition and added some details." The colour of mahogany, which was used to make the board for the sketch, "shines through the liquid paint of the strokes and gives a general tone to the whole colourful range".

Levitan's album, which is kept at the Tretyakov Gallery, contains a number of pencil sketches for the painting from 1890 to 1895. Among the sketches from this album, executed with graphite pencil on paper, is the sketch Fresh Wind. Volga (9 × 15 cm), as well as Aft Part of the Barge (9 × 15 cm), Mast (15 × 9 cm), Barges (9 × 15 cm), Steamboat (15 × 9 cm), Upper Part of the Mast. Detail of a Barge (15 × 9 cm), Barge with masts and tugboat (9 × 15 cm) and others. According to Fedorov-Davydov, the sketches of the barges and their details are interesting because of how carefully Levitan studied nature and strove for the accuracy of reproducing the depicted objects.

Sketches of Fresh Wind. Volga

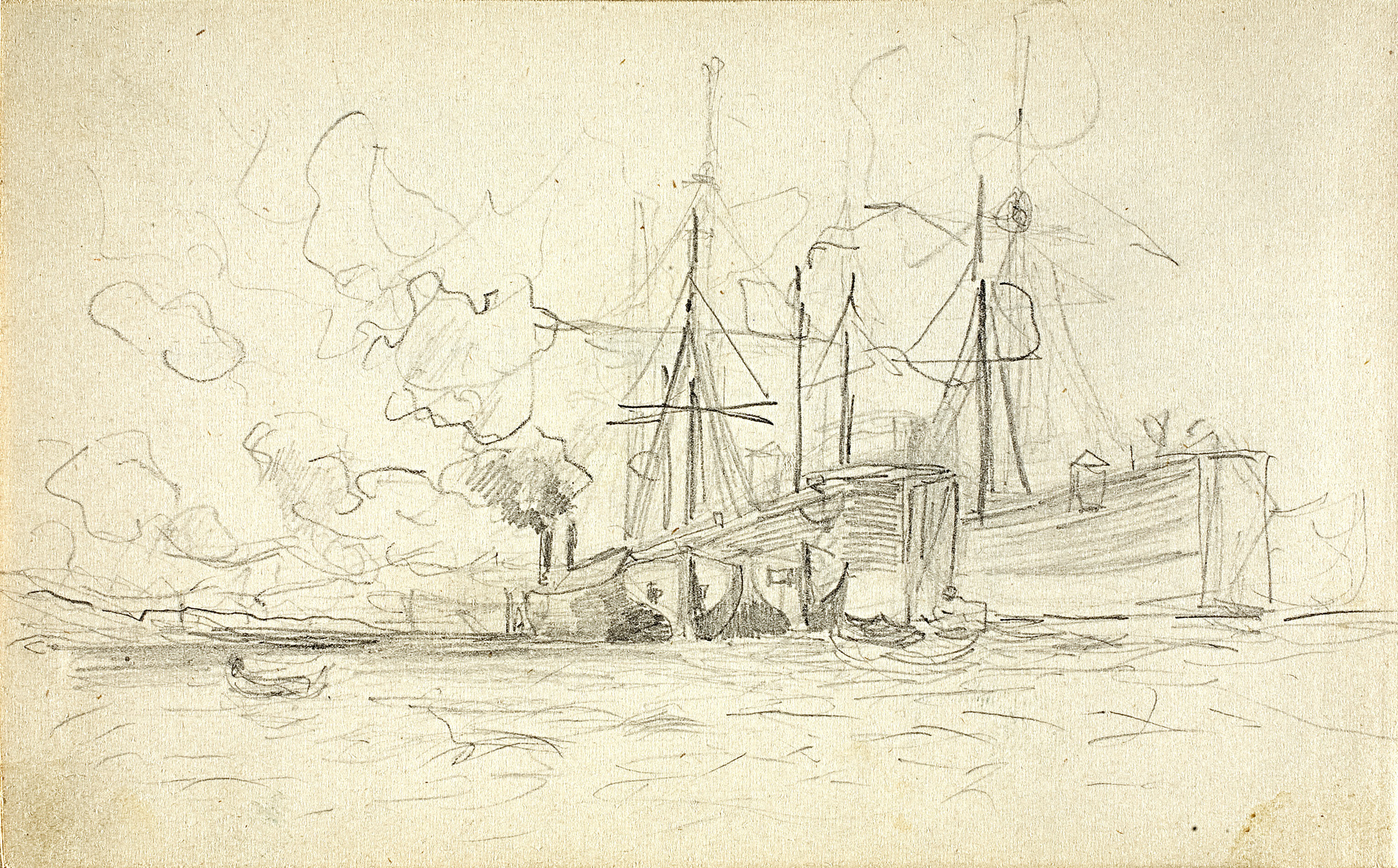
General sketch

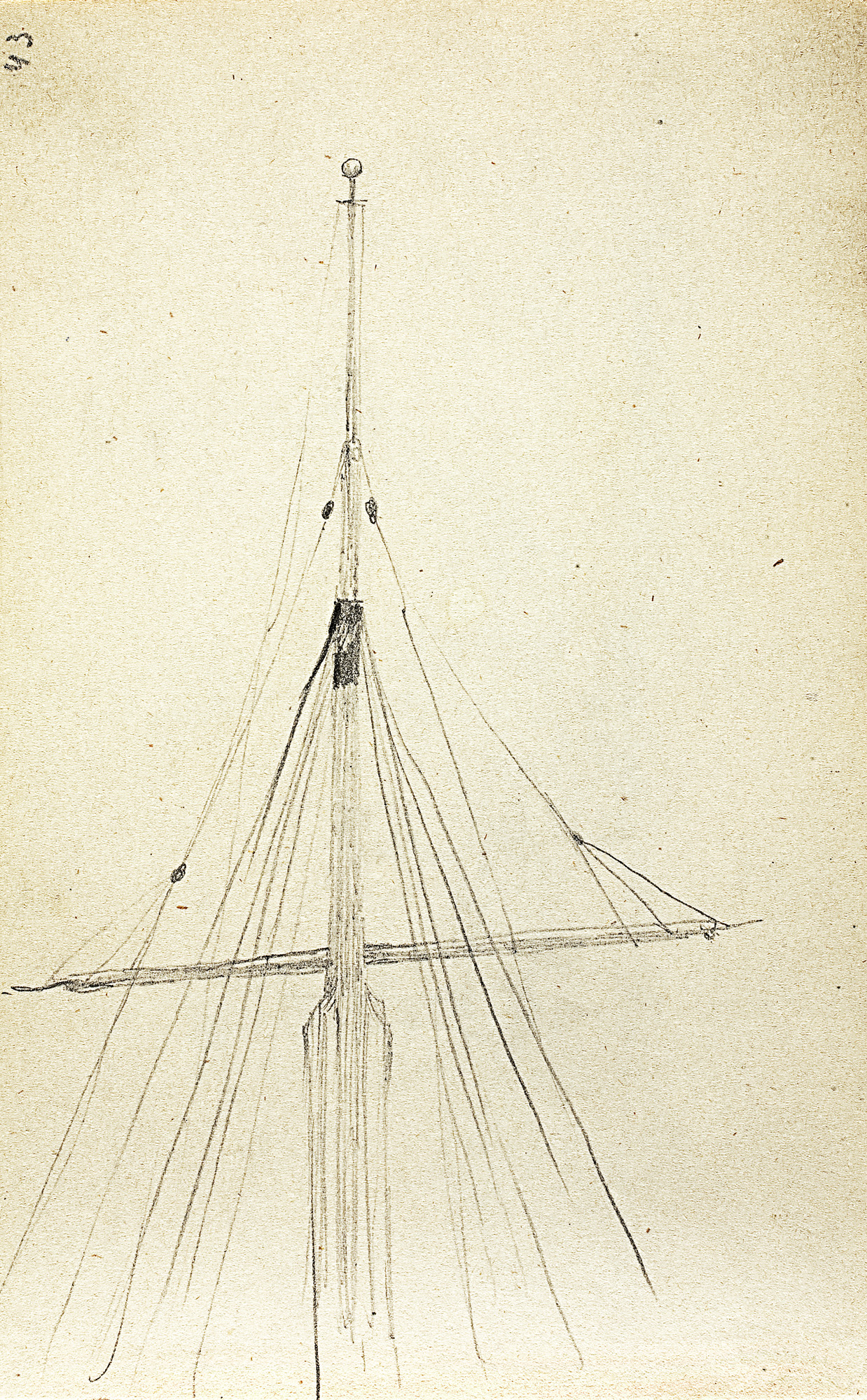
Mast

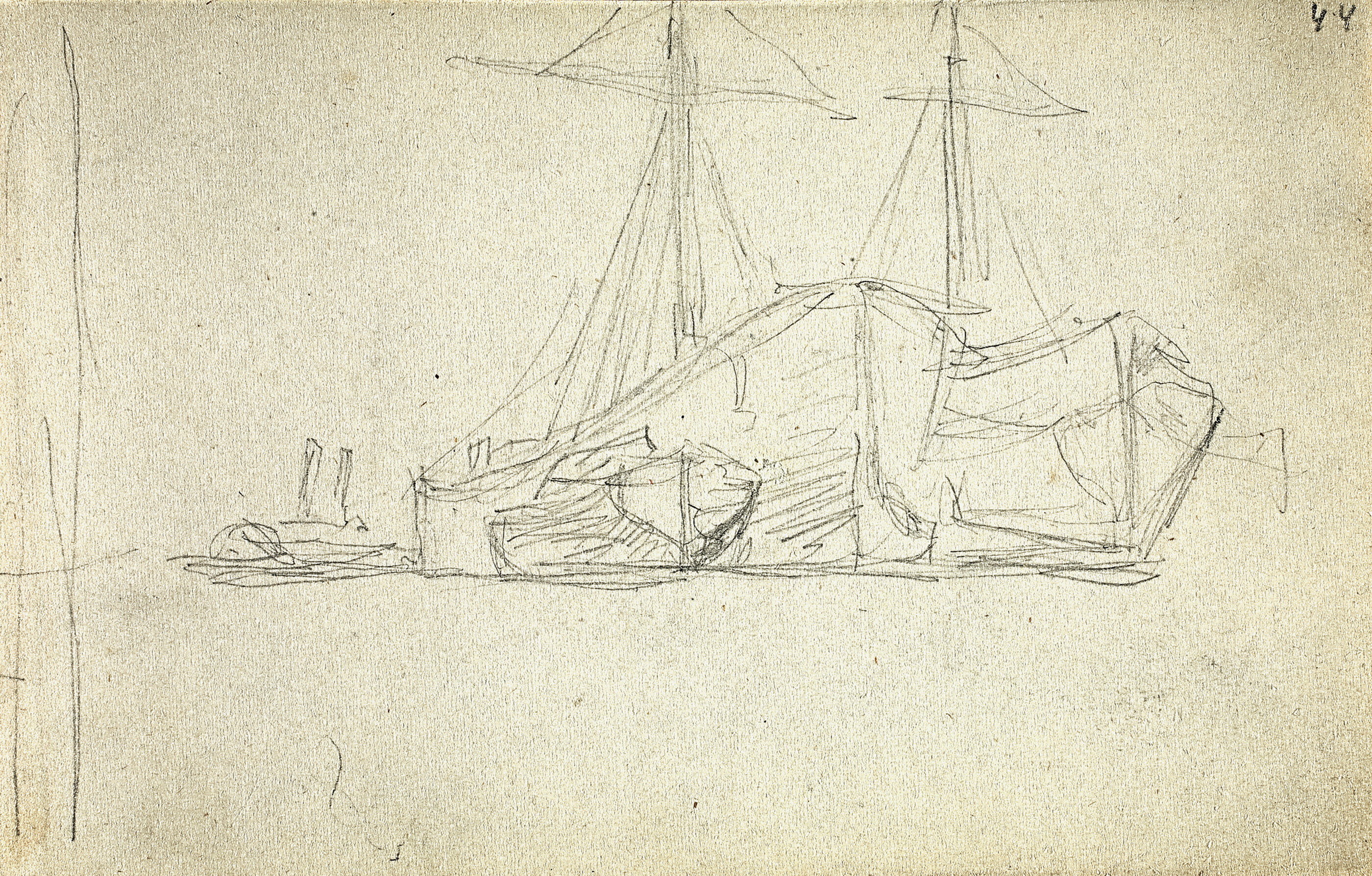
Barges

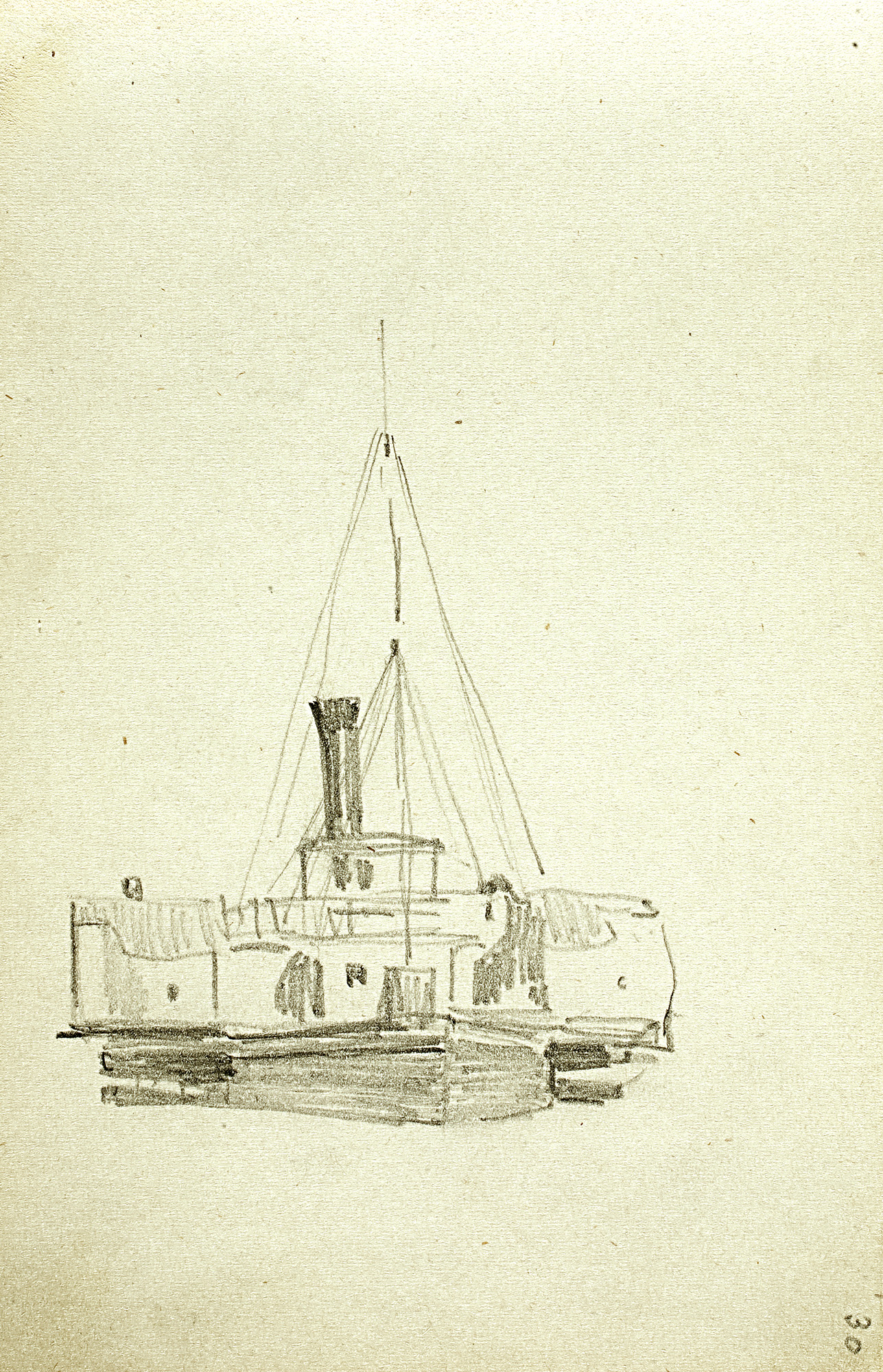
Steamship

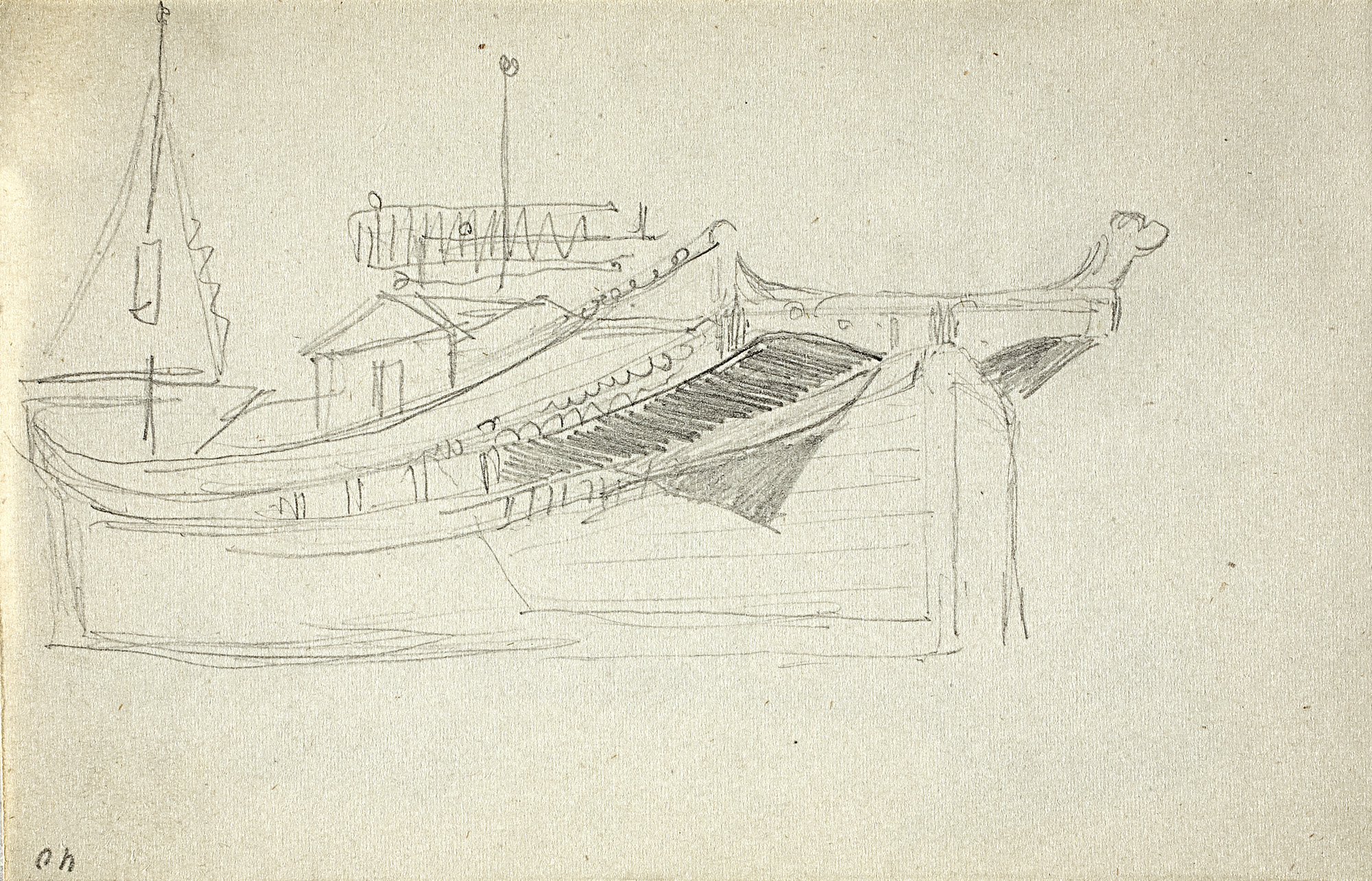
Aft Part of the Barge

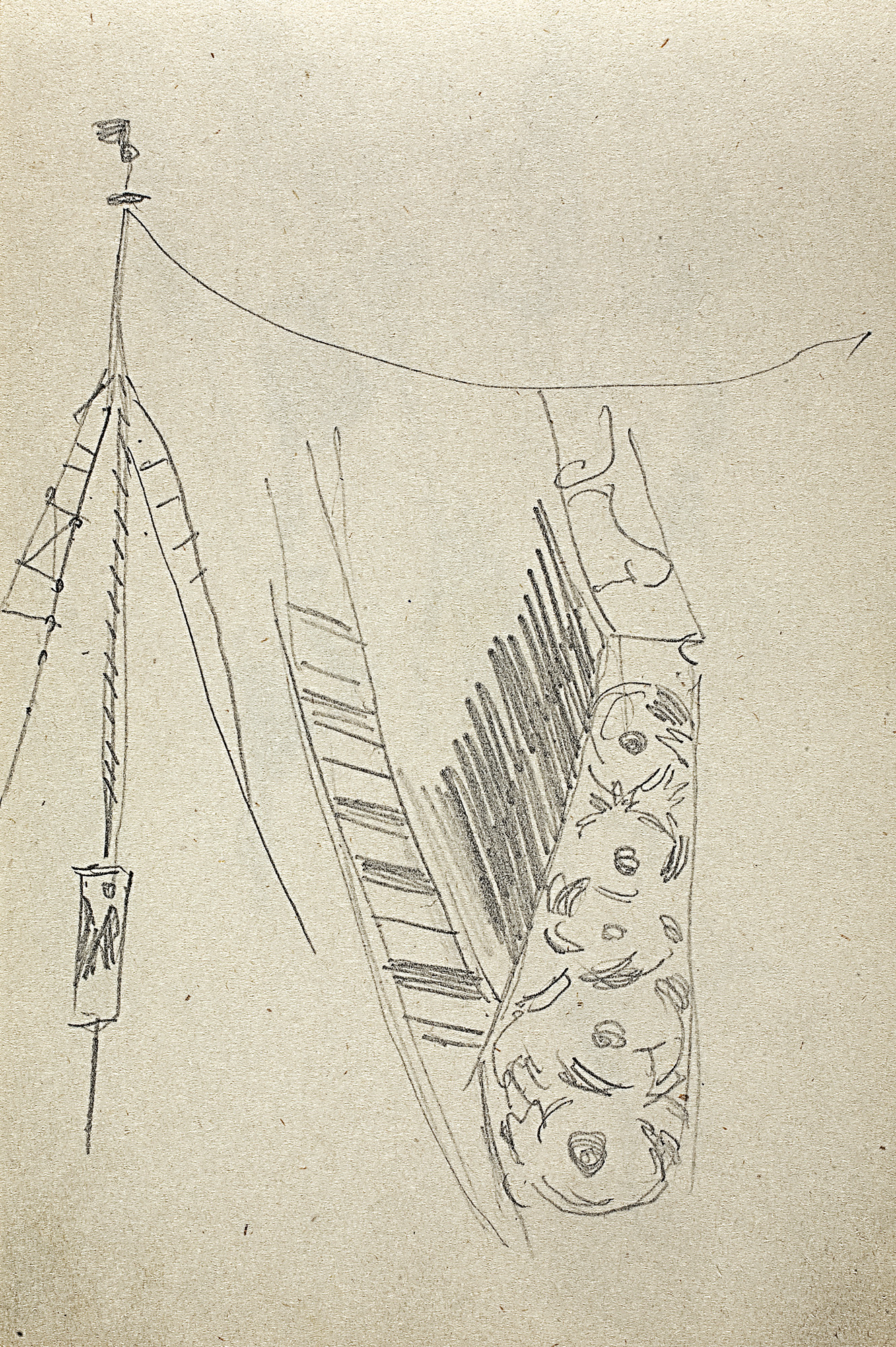
Upper Part of the Mast

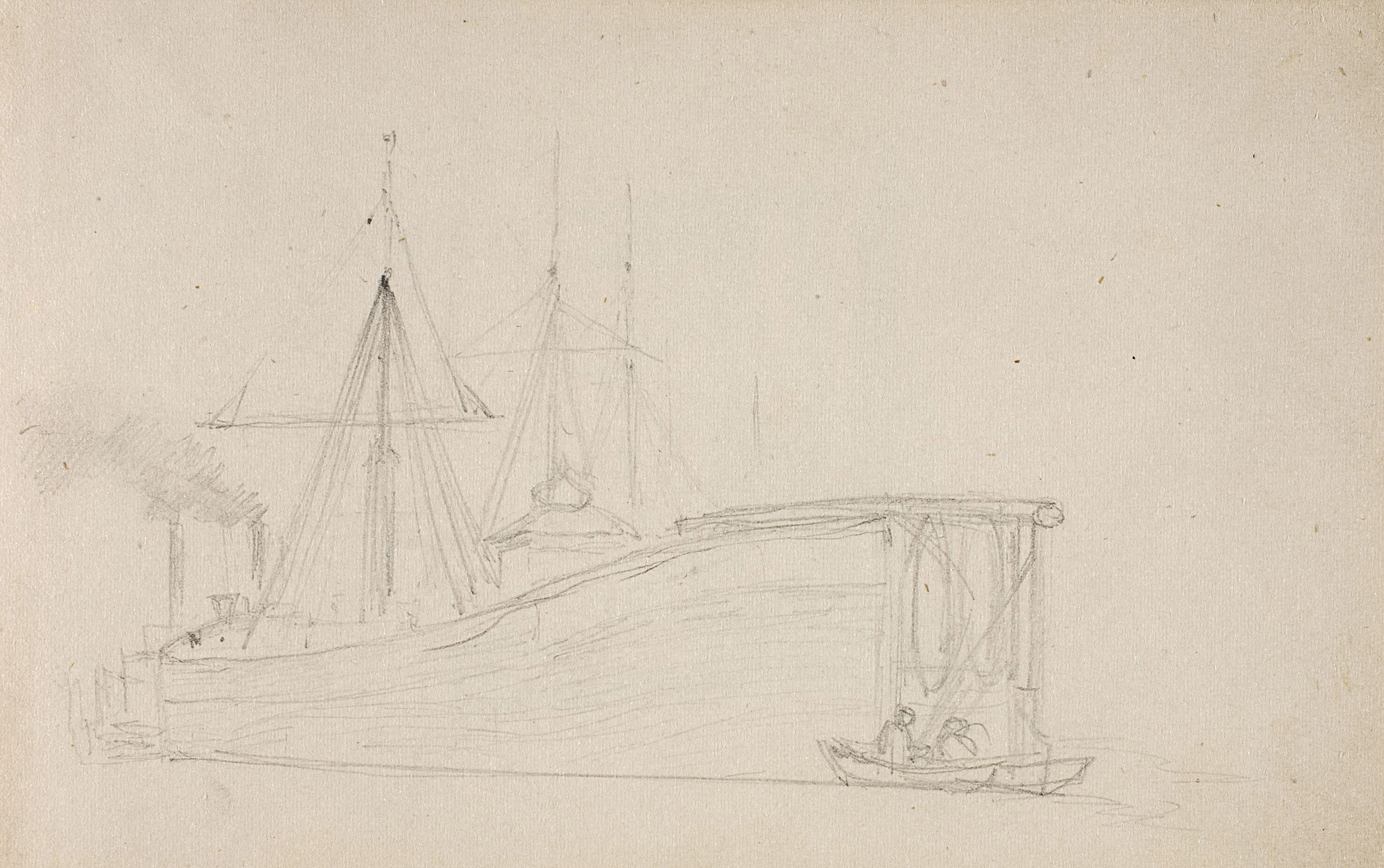
Barge with masts and tugboat

== Reception ==
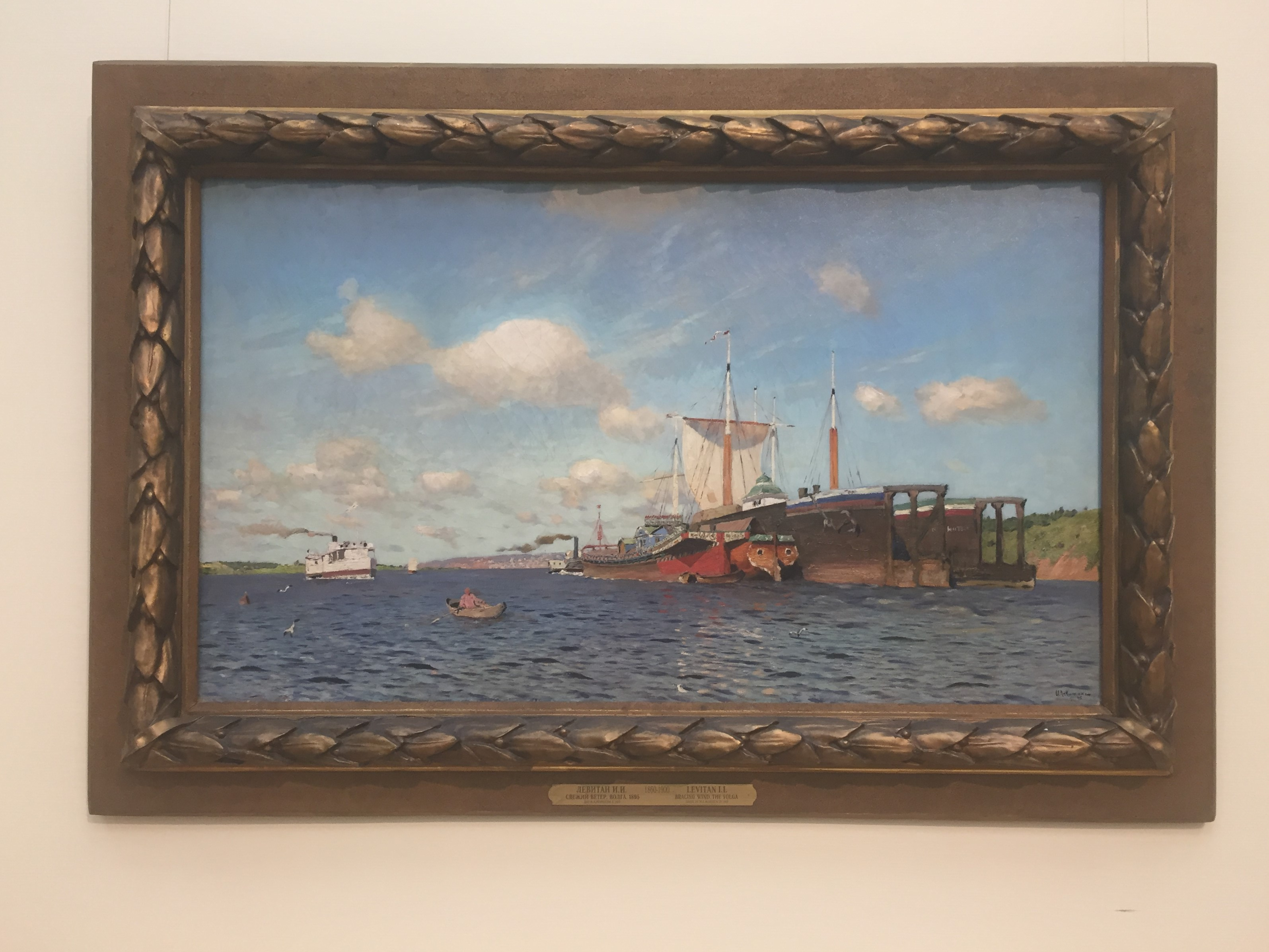
Fresh Wind. Volga on display in the Levitanovsky hall of the State Tretyakov Gallery

The sketches and paintings brought by Levitan from his trips along the Volga astounded the artist Mikhail Nesterov due to "completely new techniques and great skill" in the paintings. According to Nesterov, Levitan's Fresh Wind. Volga "with elegant barges in the foreground" was difficult to draw but was eventually completed after much effort. Nesterov noted that "perhaps no picture, except for Ilya Repin's Barge Haulers on the Volga, gives such a vivid, accurate description of the Volga" when comparing Fresh Wind. Volga to other works.

Art historian Vladimir Prytkov wrote in an introductory article to the album commemorating Levitan's 100th birthday that in Fresh Wind. Volga, the artist manifested a new interpretation of Russian nature with the greatest force. Prytkov notes that this artwork is "all fanned with the breath of the fresh Volga wind, which scattered clouds in the sky, raised strong ripples on the river, and blew the sail of the barge". According to Prytkov, the composition's dynamism, the colourful embroidery, the sparkling snow-white steamer, and white "creates a life-affirming, nationally characteristic image of the great Russian river, animated by human activity."

Aleksei Fedorov-Davydov, an art historian, wrote in a monograph on Levitan's work published in 1966 that Fresh Wind. Volga is "an example of long-term gestation"; in contrast to the relatively quickly painted March, the artist worked on Fresh Wind. Volga for several years in his studio. Fedorov-Davydov observed that this artwork conveys a "festive image of life," and that "everything is full of life" in it. According to the historian, the fact that the artist depicts nature not only in relation to human life but also in its modern vivacity allows this canvas to be called the "'industrial landscape' of the Levitan era."

According to art critic Faina Maltseva, Levitan chose "a motif in which the mighty beauty of the Volga landscape was revealed in all its sparkling splendour" for Fresh Wind. Volga. Maltseva believed that the painting belonged to a later period of the artist's work rather than the series of Volga landscapes shown at the Traveling Art Exhibitions of 1890–1891.

== Literature ==
- Bartlett, Rosamund (2021). "Merchant Class". Apollo. 193 (694): 40. ISSN 0003-6536.
- Varshavsky, Sergei (1966). "И. И. Левитан. «Свежий ветер. Волга»". Замечательные полотна (in Russian). Leningrad: Художник РСФСР. pp. 290–294.
- Karpova, Tatiana (2013). "Музей и коллекционеры" (PDF). Русское искусство (in Russian). 40 (4): 6–9.
- Levitan, Isaac (1956). Fedorov-Davydov, Aleksei (ed.). Письма, документы, воспоминания (in Russian). Moscow: Искусство. ISBN 978-5-8114-3660-6.
- Мальцева, Фаина (2002). Мастера русского пейзажа. Вторая половина XIX века. Часть 4 (in Russian). Moscow: Искусство. ISBN 978-5-210-01348-4.
- Nesterov, Mikhail (1959). Пигарёв, Кирилл (ed.). Давние дни (in Russian). Moscow: Искусство.
- Петров, Владимир (2000). Исаак Левитан (in Russian). Moscow: Белый город. ISBN 978-5-7793-0250-0.
- Пророкова, Софья (1960). Левитан (in Russian). Moscow: Молодая гвардия.
- Прытков, Владимир (1960). Исаак Ильич Левитан. К 100-летию со дня рождения (in Russian). Moscow: Советский художник.
- Fedorov-Davydov, Aleksei (1966). Исаак Ильич Левитан. Жизнь и творчество. Moscow: Искусство.
- Fedorov-Davydov, Aleksei (1975). Русское и советское искусство: статьи и очерки (in Russian). Искусство.
- Чижмак, Маргарита (2010). "Хроника жизни и творчества Исаака Левитана" (PDF). Третьяковская галерея (in Russian) (3): 58–71.
- Брук, Яков Владимирович; Иовлева, Лидия Ивановна (2001). Государственная Третьяковская галерея — каталог собрания (in Russian). Vol. 4. Moscow: Красная площадь. ISBN 978-5-900743-56-1.
- Fedorov-Davydov, Aleksei, ed. (1966). Исаак Ильич Левитан. Документы, материалы, библиография (in Russian). Moscow: Искусство.
- Russia, the land, the people: Russian painting, 1850–1910: from the collections of the State Tretyakov Gallery, Moscow, and the State Russian Museum, Leningrad. Washington, D.C.: University of Washington Press. 1986. ISBN 978-0-295-96439-3.
- Fedorov-Davydov, Aleksei (2019). Isaac Levitan. Bournemouth: Parkstone. ISBN 978-1-64461-879-0.
