= Golden Autumn =

1895 painting by Isaac Levitan

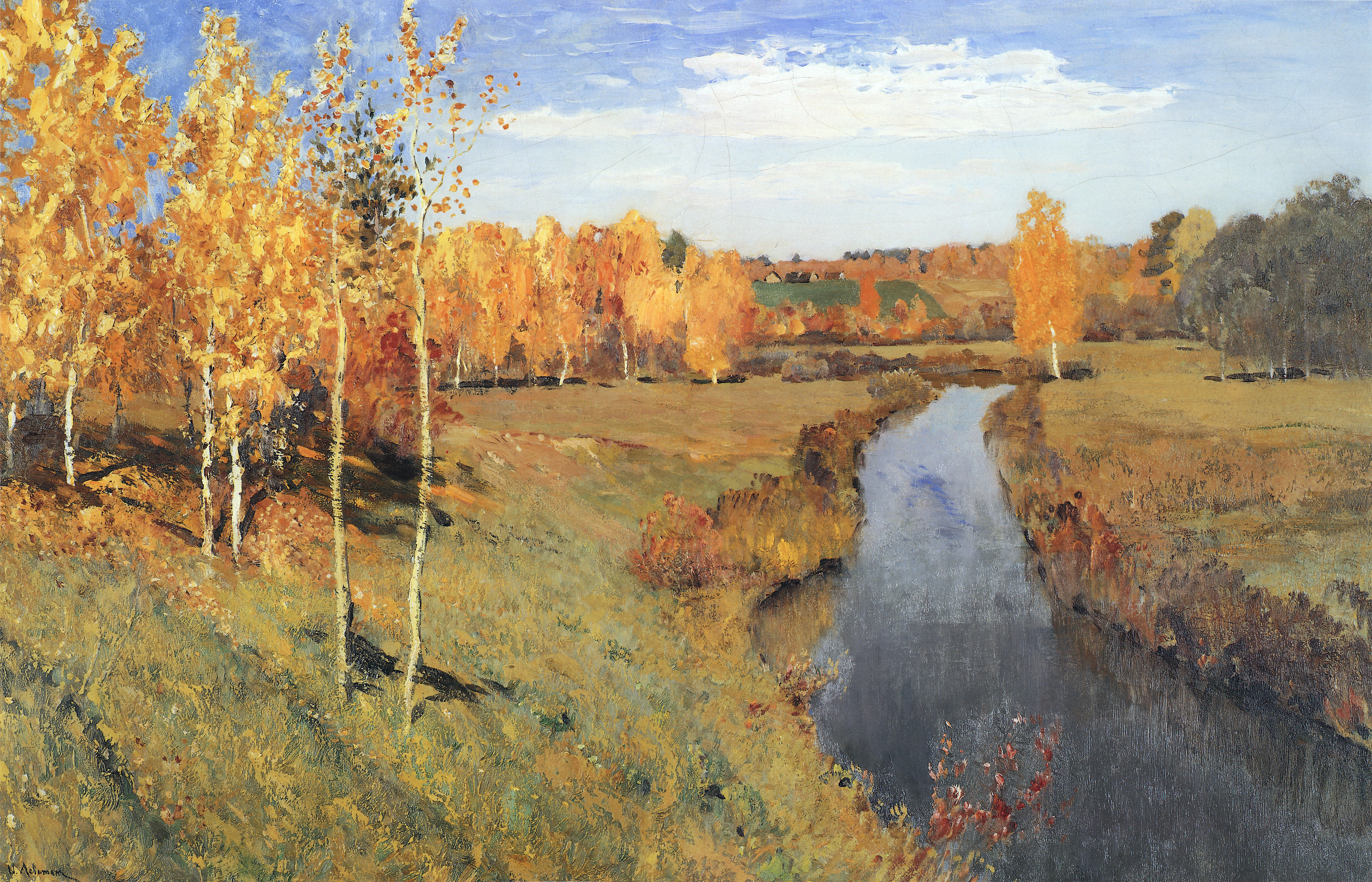
- Artist: Isaac Levitan
- Year: 1895
- Medium: Oil on canvas
- Dimensions: 82 cm × 126 cm (32 in × 50 in)
- Location: State Tretyakov Gallery, Moscow

Golden Autumn is a landscape painting by Russian painter Isaak Levitan (1860–1900), completed in 1895. The painting, which measures 82 × 126 cm, is part of the State Tretyakov Gallery's collection in Moscow (Inventory No. 1490). Levitan began working on the canvas in the autumn of 1895, while living in the Gorka estate in the Tver Governorate, where he painted the first sketches. Researchers of the artist's work believe that the painting depicts the Syezha River. It is thought that the work was completed in Moscow at the end of the year.

The painting Golden Autumn was exhibited at the 24th exhibition of the Society for Travelling Art Exhibitions ('Peredvizhniki') in February 1896 in Saint Petersburg, and later in March of the same year in Moscow. It was also displayed at the All-Russia industrial and art exhibition 1896 in Nizhny Novgorod. In that same year, Pavel Tretyakov purchased the painting from the author.

Golden Autumn belongs to a series of joyous paintings by Levitan created between 1895 and 1897. The series includes other canvases such as March (1895), Fresh Wind. Volga (1895), and Spring. Big Water (1897). This series is considered a characteristic example of the influence of Impressionism on Levitan's work.

According to art historian Alexei Fedorov-Davydov, the painting Golden Autumn "amazes and captivates with the fullness and beauty of its emotional content, so clearly expressed in the splendour of the colours, in the joyful tone of the golden colouring." Art historian Dmitry Sarabianov wrote that the artist was inspired by the "unusual, striking effect of the colour scheme, in which the contrast between gold and blue plays the leading role." According to art historian Faina Maltseva, Levitan's aim in creating Golden Autumn was not only to convey the vibrant autumn colours, but also to show "such precious features that help us see the image of great integrity and poetry behind this elegant, somewhat decorative form."

== History ==
=== Background and creation ===
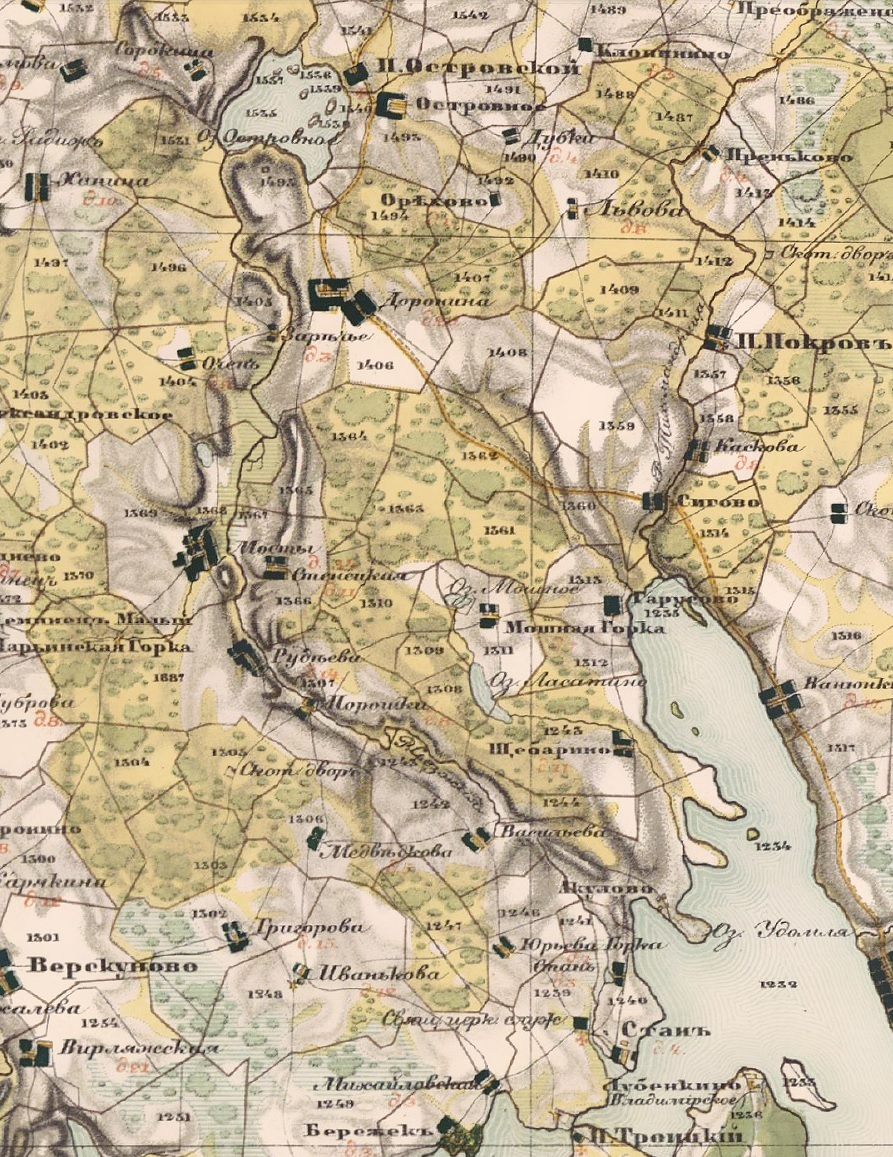
Topographic map of 1853: The river Syezha (on the map – Syezzhaya) from Lake Udomlya to Lake Ostrovno.

The painting's creation began in autumn 1895 while Levitan resided in Gorka estate, situated 1.5 kilometres from Ostrovno village in the Vyshnevolotsky Uyezd of Tver Governorate (now part of the Udomelsky District of Tver Oblast). The estate belonged to Privy Councillor Ivan Nikolayevich Turchaninov, a senator and assistant to the governor of Saint Petersburg. His wife, Anna Nikolayevna, frequently visited with their daughters Varvara, Sofya, and Anna.

Levitan had a romantic relationship with Anna Nikolaevna Turchaninova, whom he met in the summer of 1894 in Ostrovno. He lived at the Gorka estate in August and September 1894, and returned there in early spring 1895. It was during this time that he painted March. Levitan returned to Moscow at the end of March and stayed in Gorka until early October, with a possible brief return in the second half of October. A two-storey workshop house was built for the artist on the shore of Lake Ostrovno, at the confluence of the Syezhi River, as there were no suitable rooms on the estate. The house was humorously referred to as a 'synagogue'.

The painting Golden Autumn is believed to depict the Syezha River. According to some sources, the location chosen by Levitan was only half a kilometre from the Gorka estate. The Syezha River originates from the western part of Lake Udomlya, flows north-west past the Akulovskie hills, and then flows into the south-western end of Lake Ostrovno before continuing northwards. The river's name originates from the verb 'to go down' (Russian: съезжать, romanized: syezzhat'), as it was historically used to go down towards Novgorod. Syezha flows into Uver, Uver into Msta, and Msta into Lake Ilmen, from which the Volkhov River flows through Novgorod.

Artist Vitold Byalynitsky-Birulya, who also worked in those places, stated that Levitan based his painting Golden Autumn on a sketch made during his stay in Gorka. Art historian Faina Maltseva also believes that Levitan used autumn sketches created in Gorka, while the final version of Golden Autumn was painted in Moscow. According to her, the impression that the landscape was painted from life is due to the painter's "exceptional visual memory and inspired skill." Apparently it was the passionate work on this landscape that led Levitan to refuse the artist Vasily Polenov's offer to visit him at the Borok estate in a letter dated 13 November 1895: (Note: The Julian calendar ("old style") is used to date events that took place in the Russian Empire.) "I was on my way to see you, dearest Vasily Dmitrievich, when suddenly, just suddenly, I was passionately drawn to work; I was carried away, and it has been a week already that I have not broken away from the canvas day in and day out... As I began to work, my nerves became calmer and the world was not so terrible."

=== 24th traveling exhibition and subsequent events ===
Together with nine other works by Levitan, including March, Fresh Wind. Volga, Spring. The Last Snow, Ferns in a Forest, Twilight, Nenuphar and others, the canvas Golden Autumn was exhibited at the 24th exhibition of the Society for Travelling Art Exhibitions ('Peredvizhniki') in Saint Petersburg on 11 February 1896. The exhibition then moved to Moscow in March of the same year. The Saint Petersburg exhibit was held in the building of the Society for the Encouragement of the Arts, while the Moscow exhibit was held in the premises of the Moscow School of Painting, Sculpture and Architecture.

Levitan's exhibited canvases received mixed reviews from critics. In particular, in the note 'The Exhibition of Peredvizhniki', published in the Vsemirnaya Illustratsiya (Vol. 55, No. 1413 for 1896), Vladimir Chuiko praised Levitan for his choice of subjects and his peculiar way of painting, noting that "almost all his paintings (10 in number) attract attention, with the exception of two: March and Spring, which are too rough and harsh in tone." In an article published in the magazine Russkaya Mysl (May 1896 issue), the writer Mitrofan Remezov ironically referred to the entire landscape component of the travelling exhibition, including Levitan's "'forests' of autumn gold": in Remezov's words, "we pay tribute to the artists' skill, but we begin to become indifferent to their works: we have already seen all the 'moods', experienced all the impressions, and are repeating the sensations." Petersburgskaya Gazeta published a poetic feuilleton mocking the painting Golden Autumn: "Ochre dosage very big, / The bold punch of the brush to the canvas, / So much for the 'Golden Autumn', / And 'A gift to the Museum'". Nevertheless, in most reviews Levitan's works were evaluated positively, which, according to art historian Alexei Fedorov-Davydov, testified to "the recognition of the artist's talent, the originality of his work and his bright individuality."

In May 1896, Pavel Tretyakov bought the canvas from the author for 700 rubles, directly from the travelling exhibition, which was still in Moscow at the time. However, the implementation of this transaction was delayed for some reason: the first receipt Levitan received for the painting is dated 10 May, and in a letter dated 29 May he writes that "yesterday, returning from a trip, met P. M. Tretyakov, who for some reason now thought to buy my painting "Golden Autumn", having seen it dozens of times", and only on 3 June he reported to Tretyakov: "My painting Golden Autumn has not yet been sold, and therefore I consider it for you. It goes without saying that I am very glad that you wanted it." Pavel Tretyakov acquired over twenty works by Levitan for his gallery. The first canvas, Autumn Day. Sokolniki (1879), was purchased in 1880 and also featured autumn themes. March and Golden Autumn were acquired in 1896 and reflected the artist's search for a "more colourful and decorative palette." These works continued "Levitan's monograph," which was established by the founder of the Tretyakov Gallery.

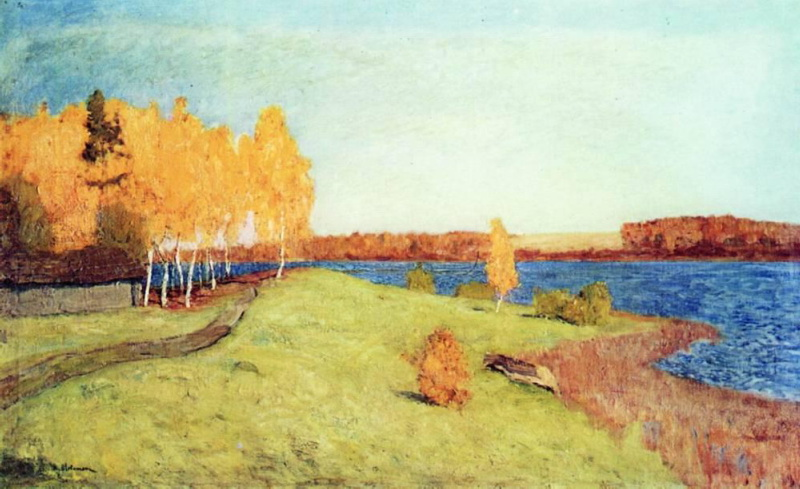
Isaac Levitan. Golden Autumn (1896, State Tretyakov Gallery)

The painting Golden Autumn was also exhibited at the All-Russia industrial and art exhibition, which opened on 28 May 1896 in Nizhny Novgorod. Levitan himself visited the exhibition, where a total of eighteen of his paintings were displayed. In addition to works from the travelling exhibition, a number of Levitan's works from the late 1880s and early 1890s were presented in Nizhny Novgorod. This was the first wide retrospective display of the artist's work. The 24th travelling exhibition continued its journey to other cities of the Russian Empire in autumn and winter, visiting Kharkiv (October–November), Kyiv (December–January) and Tula (January–February). The exhibition catalogue issued in Kharkiv described the paintings Golden Autumn and March as "property of the Moscow City Gallery of brothers P. and S. Tretyakovs."

In Kharkiv, the painting Golden Autumn was damaged when a copper canopy from a wall heater fell on it and tore through the canvas. This incident was reported in a letter dated 22 November 1896 by Georgy (Yegor) Khruslov, the artist and commissioner of the Association for Exhibitions, to Ilya Ostroukhov: "This morning we had an accident at the exhibition. The paintings had all been taken down from the easels, some were lying on the floor, some were against the walls, all were working at one end of the hall. Suddenly, at the other end, there was a loud bang, I ran there – it turned out that a heavy copper canopy of the calorifier had been torn from the wall and fallen on I. Levitan's painting Golden Autumn, the canvas of the painting was torn through, although the wound is insignificant and it is easy to repair, but considering the fact that the painting belongs to P.M. Tretyakov, I humbly ask the Board to inform me as soon as possible in Kyiv what I should do with the painting..." In a letter to Khruslov dated 27 November 1896, Ilya Ostroukhov wrote: "Regarding Levitan's painting, I have sent you a message about sending this thing to Moscow. It will probably be easy to restore it here, as the crack is fresh, but of course it is necessary to see it." Subsequently, Dmitry Artsybashev, (Note: Dmitry Nikolayevich Artsybashev (1837—1917)) a restorer from Moscow, skillfully repaired the damage, and it went virtually unnoticed.

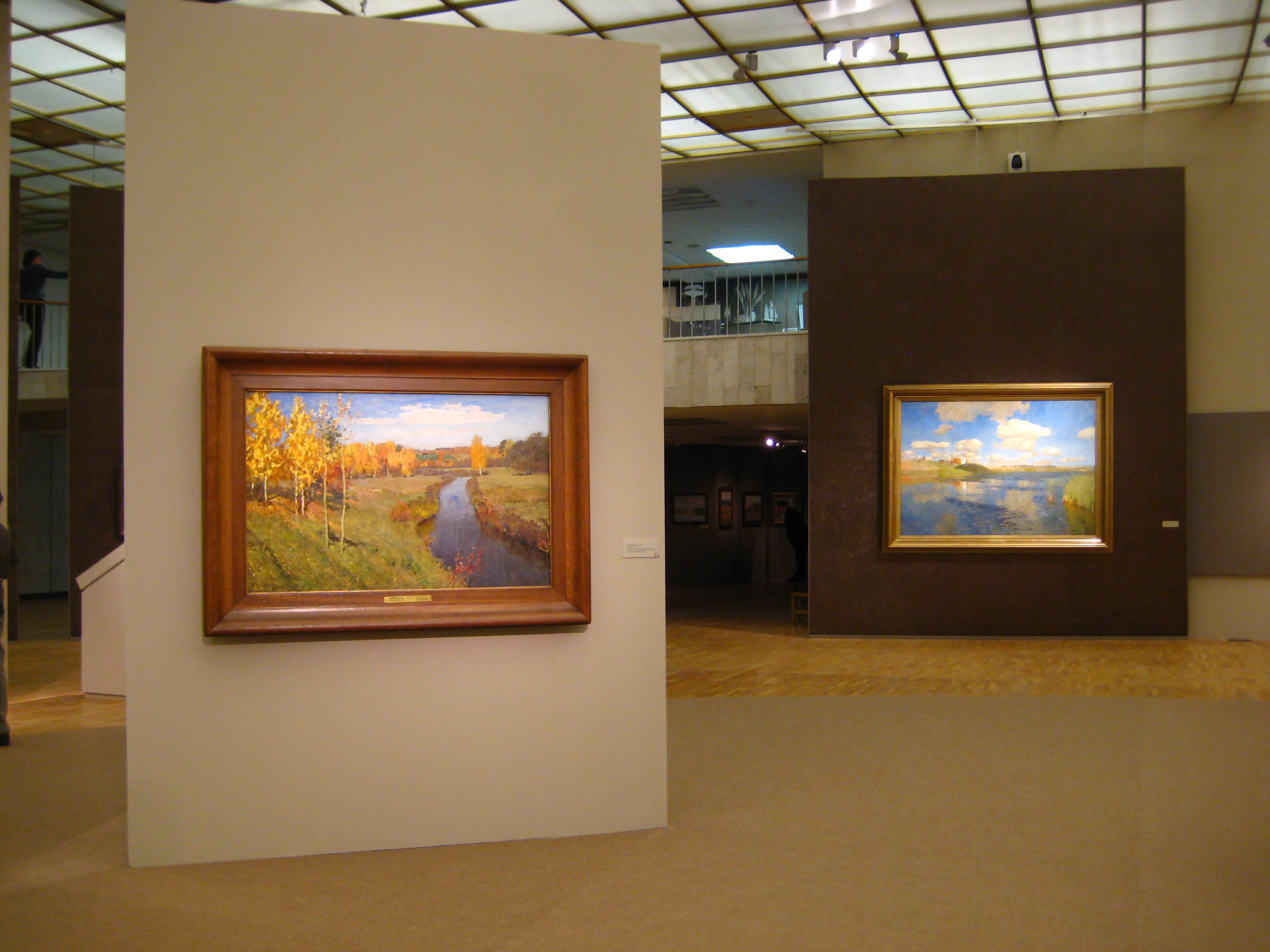
Paintings Golden Autumn and Lake at the 2010 exhibition at the State Tretyakov Gallery on Krymsky Val

In 1896, Pavel Tretyakov donated the painting he had purchased to the Tretyakov Gallery. The canvas was titled Autumn in the catalogues of 1896 and 1917. Levitan himself was not entirely satisfied with this work, considering it somewhat "rough". In the same year, he painted another, less famous painting with the same title – Golden Autumn. This painting is also in the collection of the State Tretyakov Gallery (canvas on cardboard, oil, 52 × 84.6 cm, inv. 5635).

The painting Golden Autumn was exhibited at various exhibitions, including Levitan's personal exhibition in 1938 at the State Tretyakov Gallery, and the jubilee exhibition in 1960–1961 in Moscow, Leningrad, and Kyiv. However, it was only displayed in the Moscow part of the exposition. The painting was exhibited in 1971–1972 at 'The Peredvizhniki in the State Tretyakov Gallery' (Moscow) and 'Landscape Painting of the Peredvizhniki' (Kyiv, Leningrad, Minsk, Moscow) exhibitions, which were held to celebrate the centenary of the Society for Travelling Art Exhibitions. The painting Golden Autumn was exhibited at the New Tretyakov Gallery on Krymsky Val as part of the exhibition celebrating the 150th anniversary of Levitan's birth. It was restored specifically for the exhibition and was considered a highlight of the project.

An opinion poll of visitors to the Levitan anniversary exhibition, held in Moscow in 2010–2011, was conducted. The poll results show that Golden Autumn ranked sixth among the artist's most popular works, surpassing At the Pool (1892, State Tretyakov Gallery), Over Eternal Peace (1894, State Tretyakov Gallery), March (1895, State Tretyakov Gallery), Quiet Abode (1890, State Tretyakov Gallery) and Evening Bells (1892, State Tretyakov Gallery). The painting Golden Autumn is currently on display in the Levitan Hall (Room No. 37) of the main building of the Tretyakov Gallery in Lavrushinsky Lane.

== Description ==
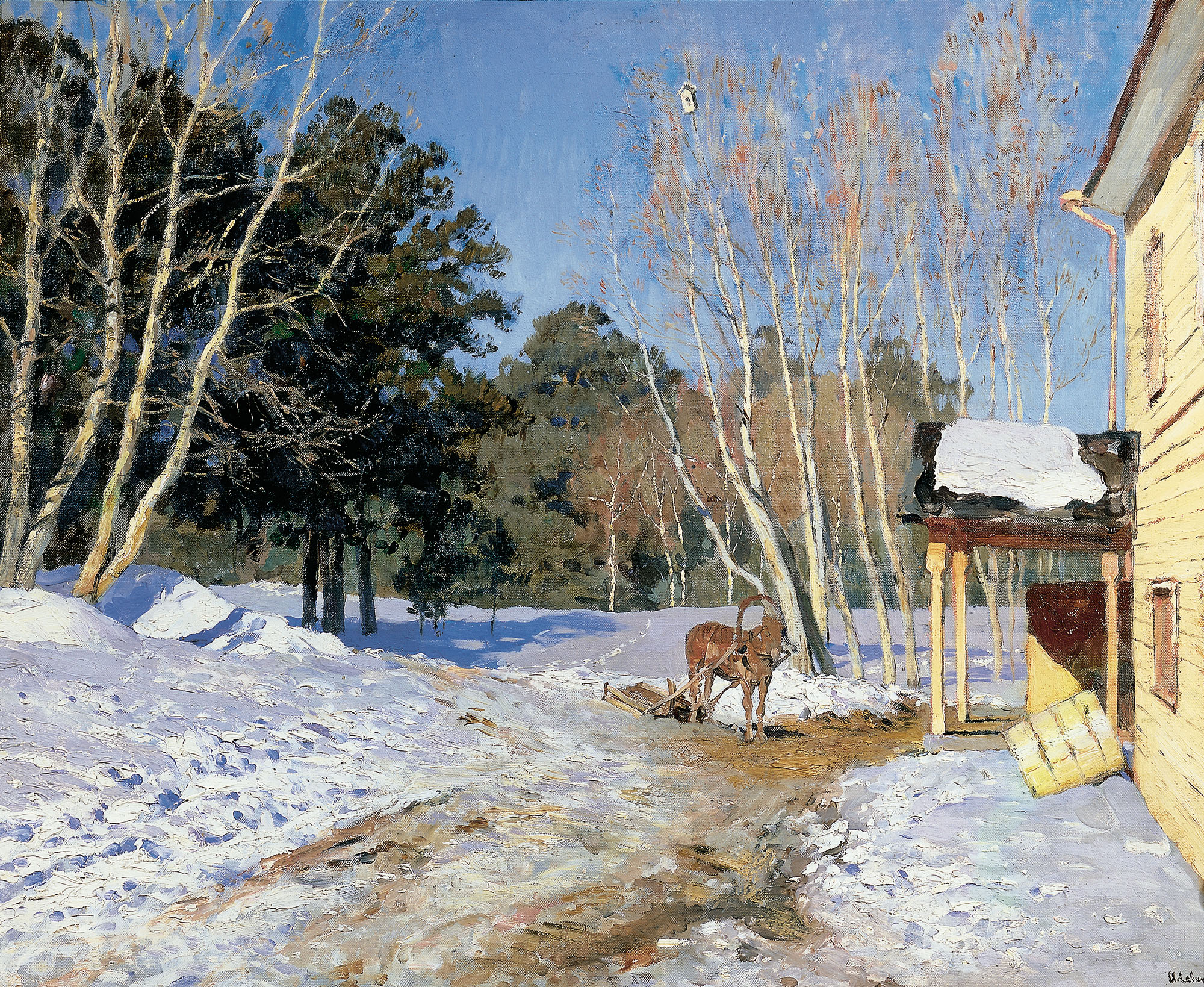
Isaac Levitan. March (1895, State Tretyakov Gallery)

Levitan was known for his love of painting autumn landscapes, with over a hundred paintings dedicated to this season. One of his most famous and popular works is Golden Autumn, which portrays a small river surrounded by trees adorned with yellow and red autumn leaves. In the distance, village houses and fields can be seen, with an autumn forest painted in shades of yellow visible on the horizon. Above it all is a blue sky with light clouds floating. The bright, joyful, optimistic colours of this painting are not typical of Levitan's work, which usually features softer and more gentle tones.

The artist's perspective is well chosen, allowing for a broad and multidimensional landscape to be depicted. Despite some asymmetry, the painting's composition does not appear unbalanced. The busy left side is compensated for by "the grouping of objects, distribution of illuminated and shaded masses, and division of plans." A group of trees, including birches with bright yellow foliage and aspens with the last reddened leaves, is depicted in close-up at the left edge of the canvas. They create a "bright and sonorous patch", which contrasts with the "slowly flowing, 'cold' river reflecting the coolness of the sky" to the right, which appears dark and cold. The meadow in the foreground appears to be a single colored patch, although it is actually painted in various shades of green and yellow. These colors are conveyed through small smear marks. Brownish shades can also be seen in some areas. The surface of the river appears to be another large color patch, with the base being blue, to which brownish reflections from the banks are added. Against the background of water, a bush with reddish leaves is clearly visible.

The viewer's gaze follows the riverbanks, crossing wide meadows flanked by forests on both sides. In the distance, the eye is drawn to the forests. A lone slender golden-yellow birch stands out on the right bank of the river, with a green foliage forest to its right. The river bends to the left in the distance and disappears from view. This bend enlivens the composition, adding an element of "coincidence." At the edge of the distant forest, where the terrain rises slightly, there are green fields with winter crops and several village houses depicted. Moving further into the depths, the colour gradually softens and changes to a calmer scheme.

The painting Golden Autumn shares the main colour components of March, namely yellow, blue, and green. However, the key difference between the two paintings is that March features cooler tones, while Golden Autumn predominantly uses warmer tones. In Golden Autumn, the green colour plays a minor, supporting role, with the main emotional impact coming from the yellow colour. This colour choice "determines the solemn joyfulness and calm, self-confident beauty" in the painting.

Fragments of the painting Golden Autumn

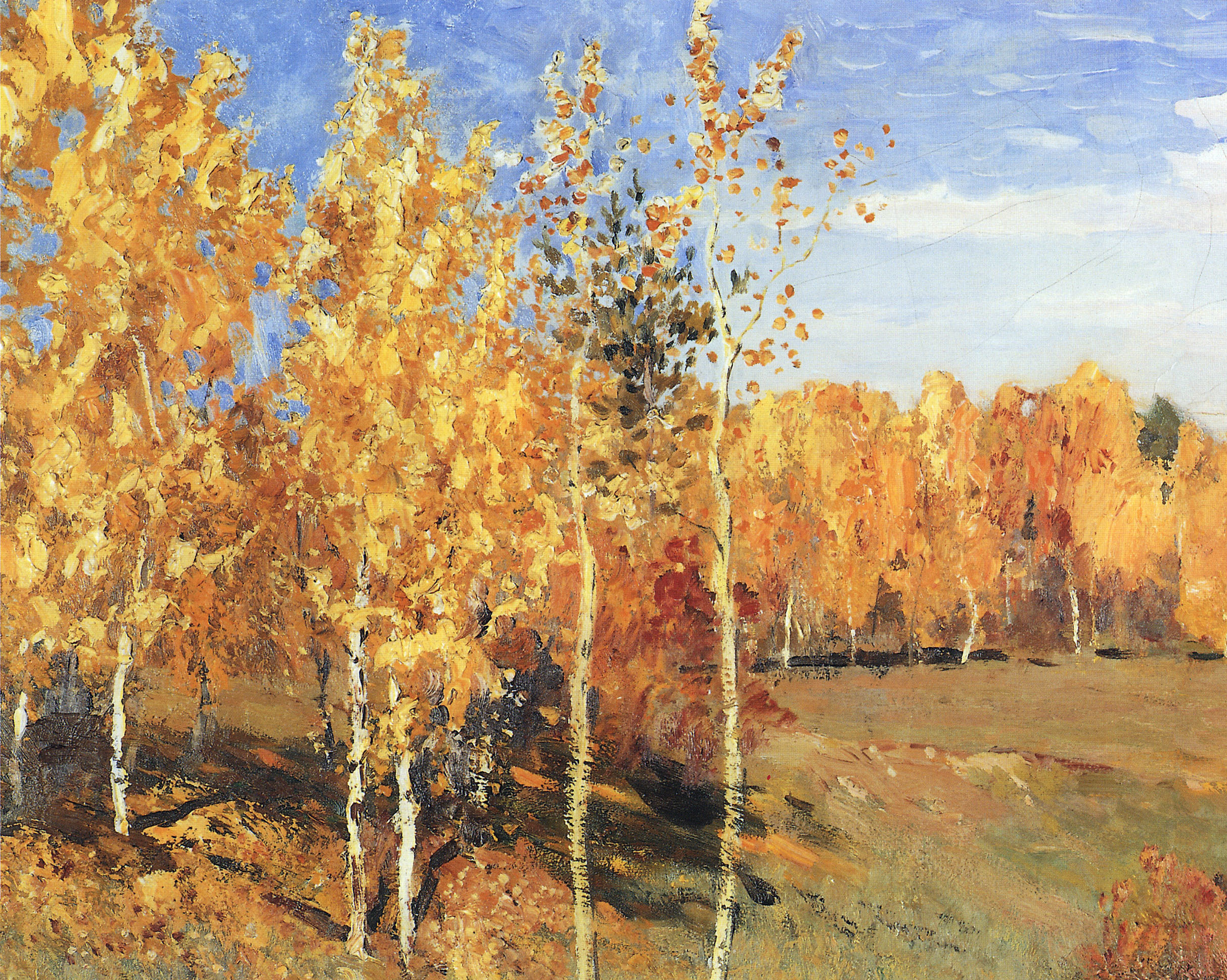
Trees on the left side of the canvas

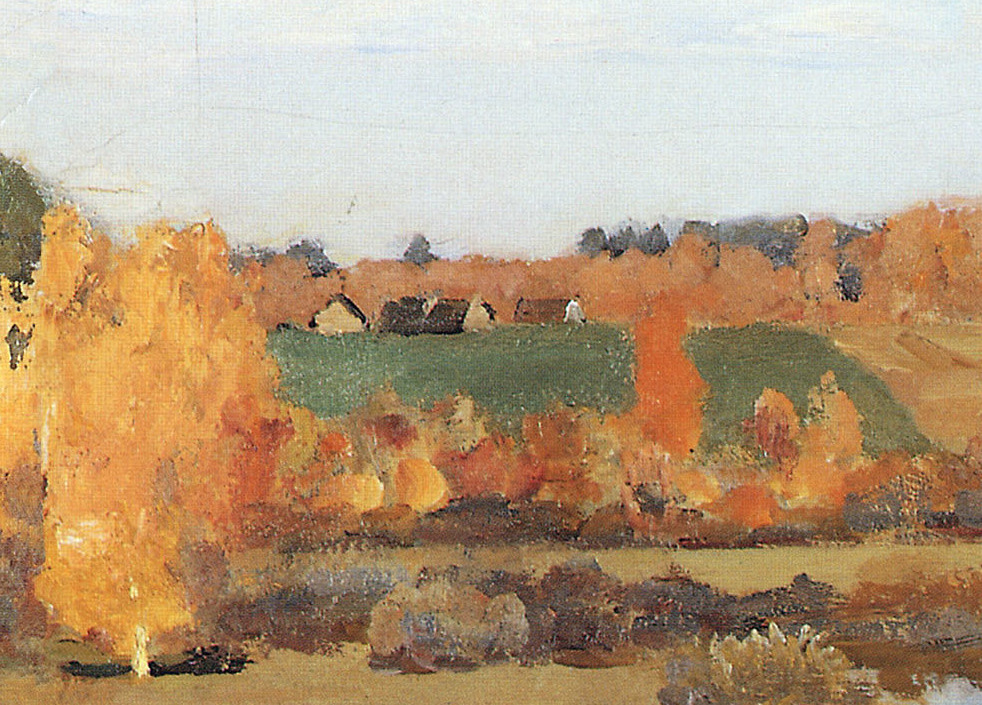
Houses and fields in the background

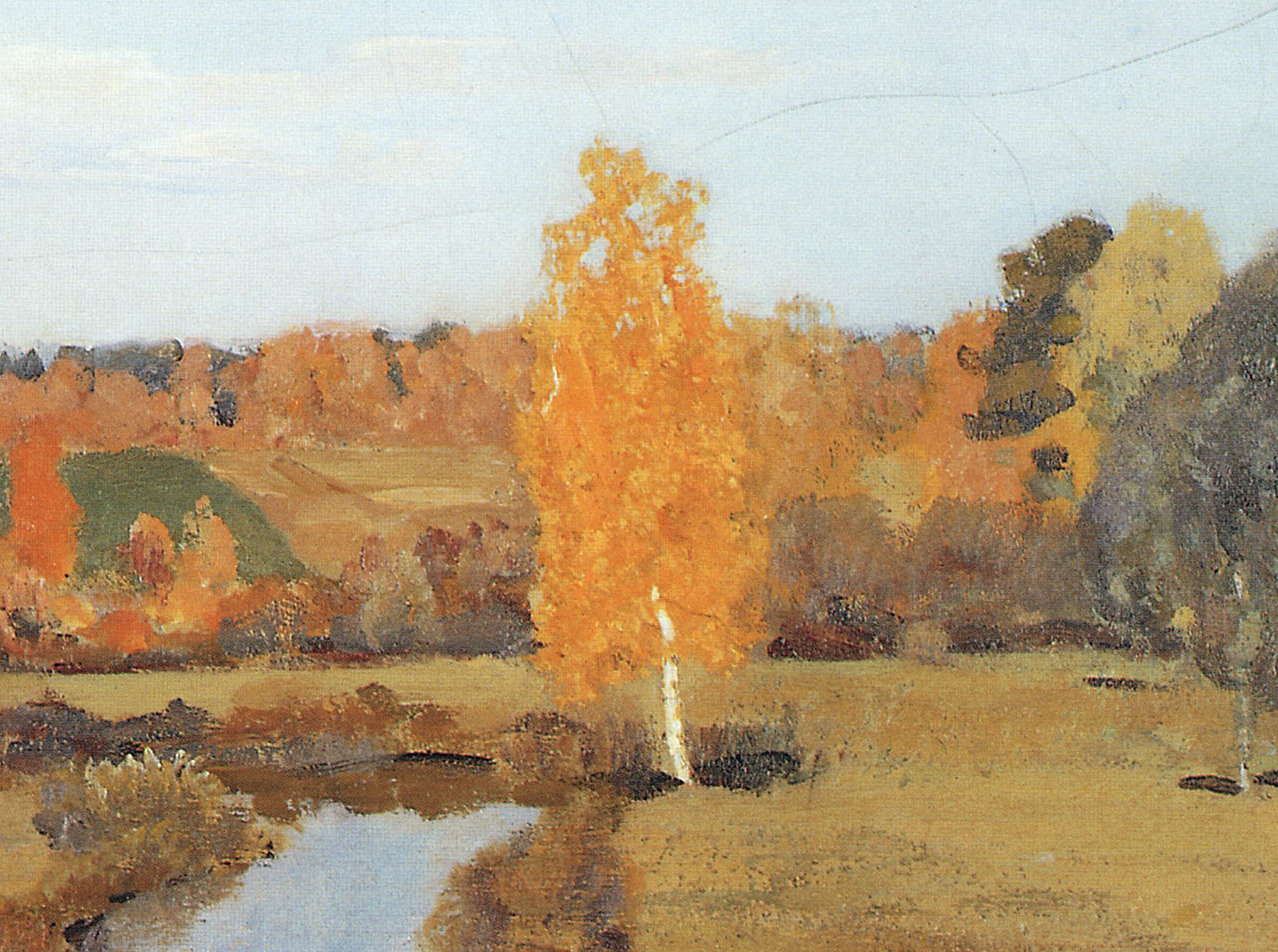
A lone birch tree by the river

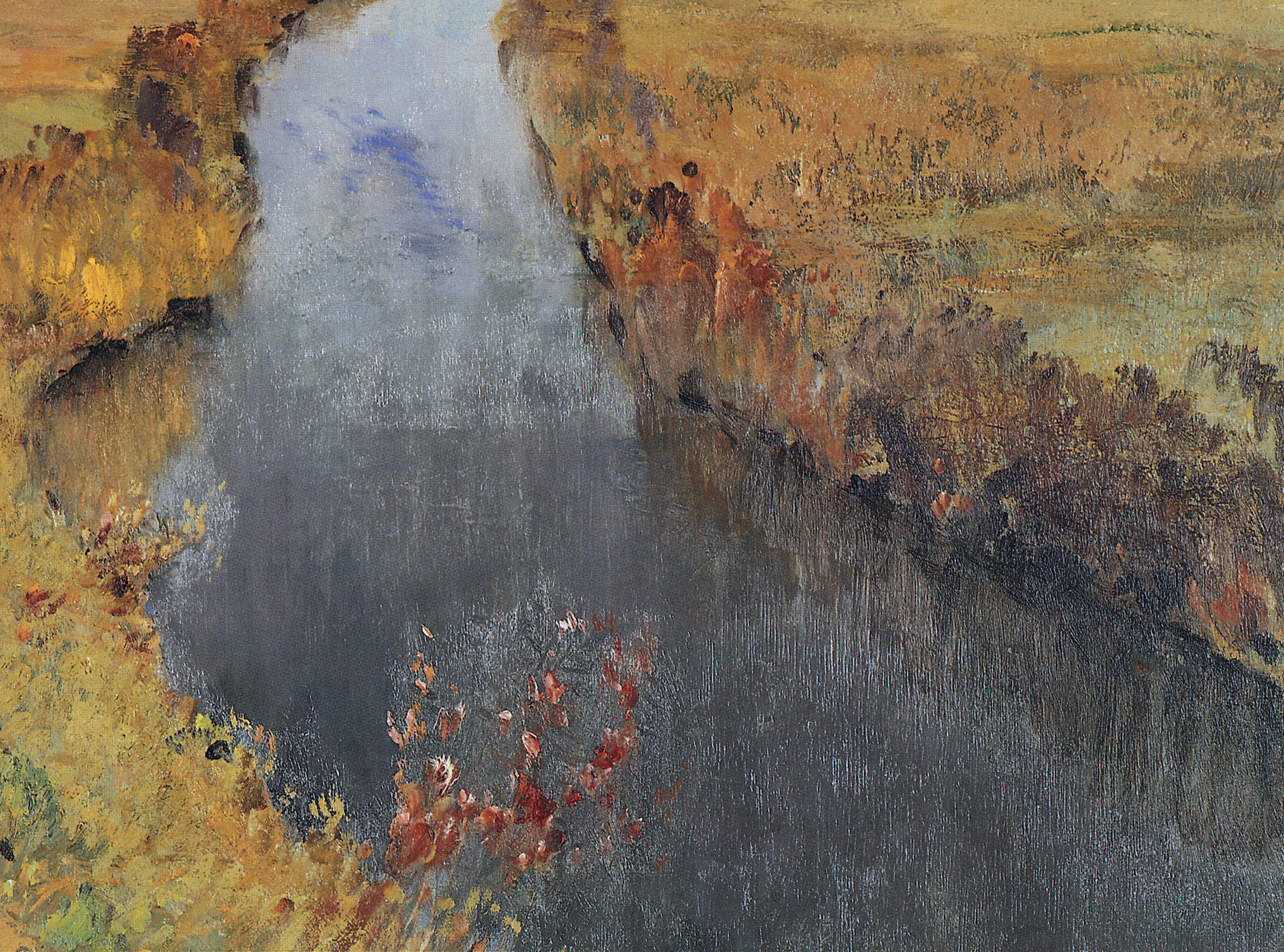
The river on the right side of the canvas

Another similarity between March and Golden Autumn is that both paintings are considered to be the best examples of influence of Impressionism on Levitan's work. Like in March, the artist uses Impressionist techniques in Golden Autumn and combines gold and blue colours to create a decorative effect, but in a "more open and strong manner." In Golden Autumn, the brushstroke's expressiveness is of particular importance. This painting showcases even more vigorous and varied brushstrokes than March. The birch tree leaves are painted with thick, expressive strokes, creating a relief-like effect in some areas. Unlike March, Golden Autumn has less glaze, mainly applied to the lower body layer. Dry brushstrokes are repeated in some places, causing them to crumble due to weak connections with the lower layer. In general, the painting Golden Autumn combines traditional painting techniques with a free, almost impressionistic interpretation of individual details. However, it differs from classical impressionism in that the colours do not dissolve in the light but retain their intensity.

== Reviews and critique ==
Art historian Alexei Fedorov-Davydov wrote that the painting Golden Autumn "amazes and captivates by the fullness and beauty of its emotional content, so clearly expressed in the splendour of colours, in the great sound of the golden colour scale." In his opinion, before the appearance of this painting, none of the representatives of Russian landscape painting (including Levitan himself) "had given such a solemn, joyful in its tranquillity image of autumn, such a depiction of "lush nature fading away". According to Fedorov-Davydov, the Golden Autumn canvas is a new, plastically enriched stage of "landscape mood", it "sounds like a song or a poem", and standing in front of it, we once again realise "what a poet of nature, what a finely felt and organically expressed poetry of the man Levitan was".

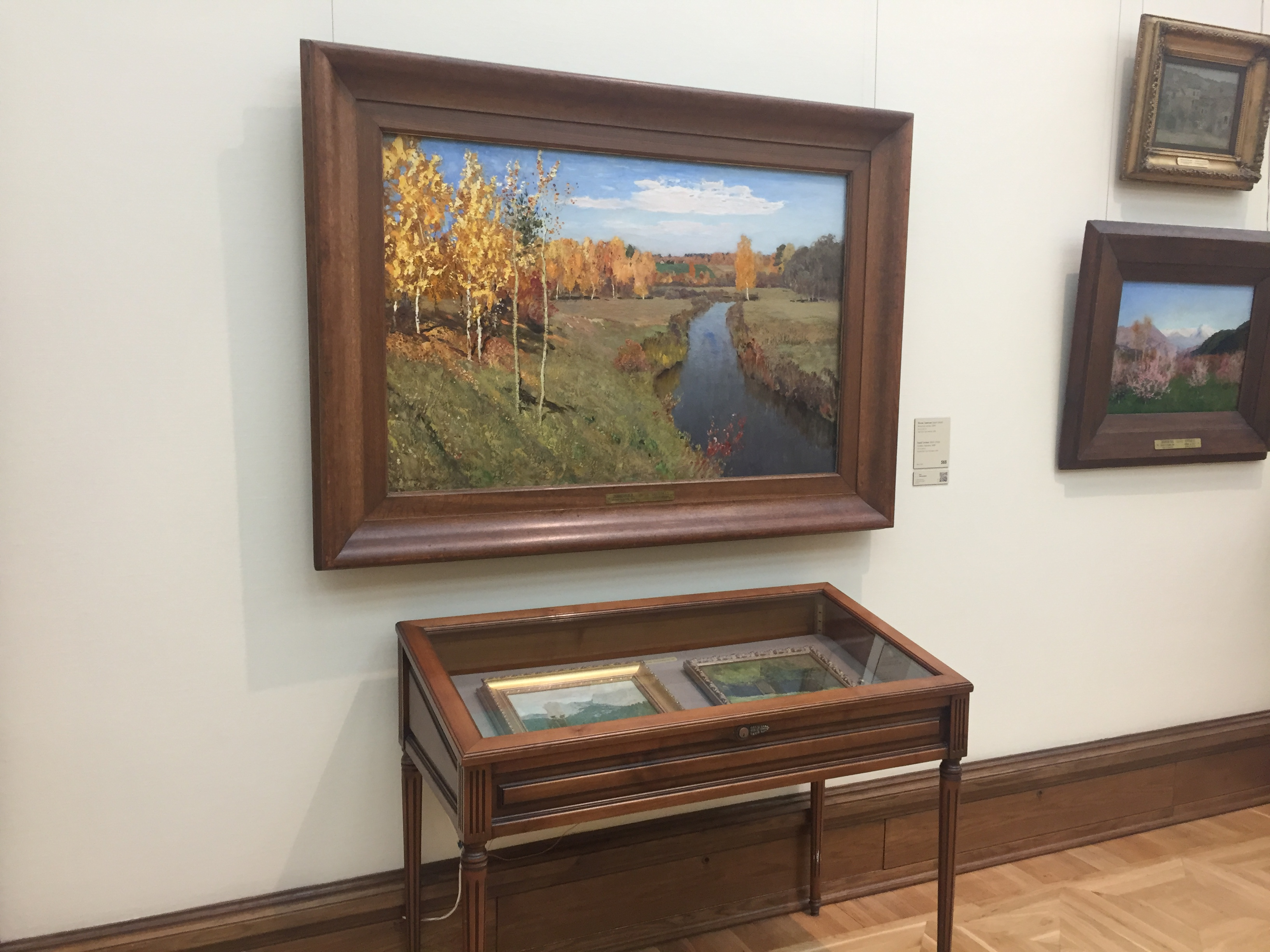
The painting Golden Autumn in the Levitan Hall (Note: Room No. 37 of the main building on Lavrushinsky Lane) of the State Tretyakov Gallery

Comparing Golden Autumn with March, painted in the spring of the same year, the art historian Dmitry Sarabianov wrote that in the autumn landscape there was no fragmentariness, that is, "the feeling of a fragment of nature", which was inherent in March. According to him, the artist was inspired to create Golden Autumn by the "unusual, striking effect of the colour scheme, in which the contrast between gold and blue plays the leading role". At the same time, he noted the natural balance of the composition of the painting, which is "unfolded towards the viewer and in width".

Art historian Olga Lyaskovskaya wrote in her book "Plein-air in Russian Painting of the XIX century" that Golden Autumn, unlike March, was not one of Levitan's best works. According to Lyaskovskaya, the whole painting is "somewhat conventionally, decoratively painted, which is emphasised by the flat white clouds in the bright blue sky"; she also noted the generalised outlines of the trees and the "nakedness" of the colour scheme. Lyaskovskaya also quoted a passage from the memoirs of the artist Boris Lipkin, which showed that Levitan himself was not satisfied with Golden Autumn, saying when it was mentioned: "Well, it's so crude."

According to art historian Faina Maltseva, the image created in this painting "carries a deep and multifaceted content", which "is revealed as you look at what is depicted for a long time, as you empathise with it lyrically". In the process of such an examination, one can understand that the artist's aim was not only to convey the ornate autumn colours, but also to show "such precious features that help us to see an image of great integrity and poetry behind this ornate, somewhat decorative form". According to Maltseva, there is "nothing accidental" in the painting, and "the immediacy of the vital impression" was achieved through a long search for a suitable composition and the rejection of many unimportant details.

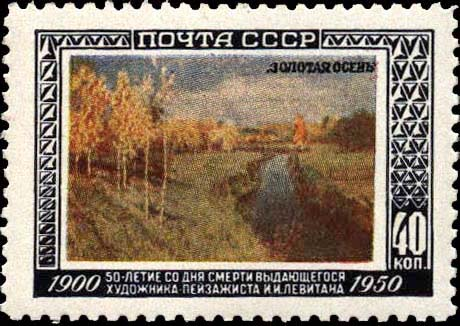
Painting Golden Autumn on the USSR postage stamp of 1950

Art historian Vladimir Petrov wrote that Levitan's numerous works dedicated to the Russian autumn "together form a unique, extremely rich in emotional shades 'autumn suite'". In his opinion, the most popular of these works is the painting Golden Autumn, which is distinguished by its brightness and particular decorative style. According to Petrov, "in terms of its heightened sensual tension and condensed perception of nature, this painting does not even seem entirely 'Levitanian'". He suggests that this style is more in line with the work of later masters, such as painter Stanislav Zhukovsky or writer Ivan Bunin. However, Levitan's "comprehension of the Russian chord of nature" is somewhat similar to the frescoes found in Yaroslavl and Rostov churches of the 17th and early 18th centuries.

In his discussion of the painting Golden Autumn, writer Vladimir Porudominsky acknowledges the difficulty of describing Levitan's landscapes in words. He notes that a simple enumeration of the elements depicted, such as trees, grass, river, and sky, cannot fully convey the feeling that unites and binds them into a cohesive whole on the canvas. According to Porudominsky, when we look at the bright trunks and flaming leaves of the trees, the blue sky and the cold blue of the river, we feel both the movement of the air "that rushes into our chests" and "the energy that charges us on this warm autumn day", as well as the sadness that "the holiday of gold and blue" will soon be over, and the joyful confidence that after the winter sleep there will be green and blue again, "because nature lives forever and is always beautiful."

== Bibliography ==
- Архангельский, Н.А. (2016). Из истории Удомельского края (статьи из газет) (PDF). Т. Петрова.
- Захаренкова, Л.И. (2010). "История персональных выставок И. И. Левитана и подготовка в Третьяковской галерее выставки, приуроченной к 150-летию со дня рождения художника" (PDF). Третьяковские Чтения 2009. Moscow: Экспресс 24: 219–225. ISBN 978-5-89580-105-5.
- Иовлева, Л.И. (2010). "О левитановском пейзаже и юбилейной левитановской выставке" (PDF). Третьяковская Галерея (3): 4–13.
- Кац, Л.И. (1983). "Художники в Удомельском крае". Московский Рабочий. Kalinin.
- Колокольцов, В.И. (2004). Отклонение. Колокольцовы в Тверской губернии. Saint Petersburg: Прана. ISBN 5-86761-018-7.
- Круглов, В.Ф. (2001). Исаак Левитан. Золотая галерея русской живописи. Moscow: Арт-Родник. ISBN 5-88896-051-9.
- Левитан, И.И. (1956). Письма, документы, воспоминания. А.А. Фёдоров-Давыдов. Moscow: Искусство.
- Лужецкая, А.Н. (1965). Техника масляной живописи русских мастеров с XVIII по начало XX века. Moscow: Искусство.
- Лясковская, О.А. (1966). Пленер в русской живописи XIX века. Moscow: Искусство.
- Мальцева, Ф.С. (2002). Мастера русского пейзажа. Вторая половина XIX века. Часть 4. Moscow: Искусство. ISBN 9785210013484.
- Паустовский, К.Г. (1969). Собрание сочинений в восьми томах. Vol. 6. Moscow: Художественная литература.
- Петров, В.А. (1992). Исаак Ильич Левитан. Русские живописцы XIX века. Saint Petersburg: Художник России.
- Петров, В.А. (2000). Исаак Левитан. Moscow: Белый город. ISBN 5-7793-0250-2.
- Петрунина, Л.Я. (2012). "Выставка И. И. Левитана глазами зрителей" (PDF). Третьяковские Чтения 2010—2011. Moscow: Инико: 606–618. ISBN 978-5-89580-106-2.
- Подушков, Д.Л. (2009). Знаменитые россияне в истории Удомельского края. Tver: СФК-офис. ISBN 9785915040082.
- Подушков, Д.Л. (2014). Доступова, И.В. (ed.). "Художник Исаак Ильич Левитан в Удомле". Левитановские Чтения. Материалы Научно-практической Конференции (3—4 Октября 2011 Года). Plyos: Плёсский государственный историко-архитектурный и художественный музей-заповедник: 116–126. ISBN 9785897292141.
- Подушков, Д.Л. (2018). "Колдовское озеро". Художник И. И. Левитан и писатель А. П. Чехов на Удомельской земле. Vyshniy Volochek: Ирида-прос. ISBN 978-5-93488-212-0.
- Порудоминский, В.И. (1979). Первая Третьяковка. Библиотечная серия. Moscow: Детская литература.
- Пророкова, С.А. (1960). Левитан. Жизнь замечательных людей. Moscow: Молодая гвардия.
- Ремезов, М.Н.; Анютин, М. (1896). "Современное искусство". Русская Мысль: 176—184 (2nd pagination).
- Рогинская, Ф.С. (1989). Товарищество передвижных художественных выставок. Moscow: Искусство.
- Сарабьянов, Д.В. (1989). История русского искусства второй половины XIX века. Moscow: Издательство Московского университета.
- Фёдоров-Давыдов, А.А. (1966). Исаак Ильич Левитан. Жизнь и творчество. Moscow: Искусство.
- Фёдоров-Давыдов, А.А. (1975). Русское и советское искусство: статьи и очерки. Moscow: Искусство.
- Филиппов, В.А. (2003). Импрессионизм в русской живописи. Moscow: Белый город. ISBN 5-7793-0577-3.
- Чижмак, М.С. (2010). "Хроника жизни и творчества Исаака Левитана" (PDF). Третьяковская Галерея (3): 58–71.
- Чуйко, В.В. (1896). "Выставка передвижников (окончание)". Всемирная Иллюстрация. 55 (1413): 230–231.
- Чурак, Г.С. (2010). ""Художник чудный и гениальный"". Наше Наследие (95): 30–43.
- Государственная Третьяковская галерея — каталог собрания. Vol. 4: Живопись второй половины XIX века, книга 1, А–М. Moscow: Красная площадь. 2001. ISBN 5-900743-56-X.
- Исаак Ильич Левитан. Документы, материалы, библиография. Moscow: Искусство. 1966.
- Каталог XXIV передвижной выставки "Товарищества передвижных художественных выставок". Kharkiv: Типография Ю.А. Счасни. 1896.
- Товарищество передвижных художественных выставок. Письма, документы. 1869—1899. Moscow: Искусство. 1987.
