= Uglov =

Uglov (Russian: Углов) is a Russian male surname, its feminine counterpart is Uglova. Notable people with the surname include:

- Fyodor Uglov (1904–2008), Soviet and Russian physician
- Nikita Uglov (born 1993), Russian sprinter
