= Ivan Mokrousov =

Hero of the Soviet Union

Ivan Timofeyevich Mokrousov
- Иван Тимофеевич Мокроусов
- Born: 4 August 1919; Rakhmanivka village, Kerensky Uyezd, Penza Governorate, Russian Empire}
- Died: November 1972 (aged 53); Proletarsky District, Rostov Oblast, Soviet Union
- Military career
- Allegiance: Soviet Union
- Branch: Red Army
- Service years: 1939–1945
- Rank: Private
- Unit: 37th Guards Rifle Division
- Conflicts: World War II; Battle of the Dnieper
- Awards: Hero of the Soviet Union

Ivan Timofeyevich Mokrousov (Russian: Иван Тимофеевич Мокроусов; 4 August 1919 – November 1972) was a Red Army soldier during World War II and Hero of the Soviet Union. Mokrousov was awarded the title Hero of the Soviet Union and the Order of Lenin for his actions during the Chernigov-Pripyat Offensive in September 1943.

== Early life ==
Ivan Mokrousov was born on 4 August 1919 in Rakhmanivka village in Kerensky Uyezd of the Penza Governorate to a peasant family of Russian ethnicity. Mokrousov graduated from elementary school and worked on the tractor farm. In October 1939, he was in the Red Army.

== World War II ==
Mokrousov was in combat from the beginning of the war on 22 June 1941. In 1943, he joined the Communist Party of the Soviet Union. By September, he was a private in the machine gun company of the 114th Guards Rifle Regiment in the 37th Guards Rifle Division. On the night of 12 September, during the Chernigov-Pripyat Offensive, Mokrousov crossed the Desna River near Novhorod-Siverskyi. He reportedly took the lead in his company and threw grenades into the German trenches. Despite being wounded, he reportedly stayed on the front line, helping to repulse counterattacks. He was awarded the Order of the Patriotic War 1st class on 31 October for his actions on the night of 12 September.

On 15 January 1944, Mokrousov was awarded the title Hero of the Soviet Union and the Order of Lenin for his actions during the battle on the Desna. By April 1945, he was a sergeant in the 221st Guards Rifle Regiment of the 77th Guards Rifle Division. He distinguished himself in two separate actions on 19 and 22 April, for which he was awarded the Order of the Red Star on 30 June.

== Postwar ==
After the end of World War II, Mokrousov was demobilized. He worked as a mechanic on the Sukhovsky state farm in the Proletarsky District of Rostov Oblast. He died in November 1972 and was buried on the Sukhoi farm in the same district.
