= Kraishevo =

Kraishevo Краишево
- Selo
- Location within Volgograd Oblast Location within Russia
- Coordinates: 50°50′N 43°55′E
- Country: Russia
- Region: Volgograd Oblast
- District: Yelansky District
- Elevation: 110–120 m (360–390 ft)
- Time zone: UTC+3:00
- Postal code: 403703

Kraishevo (Russian: Краишево) is a rural locality (a selo) and the administrative center of Kraishevskoye Rural Settlement, Yelansky District, Volgograd Oblast, Russia.

The informal simplified name of the village in Russian is "Kraishevka". It's also used in various Russian sources to address the place. Accordingly, in English the names Kraishevo and Kraishevka may be considered as equal. In Russia this name of the village is unique.

The population was 1,204 as of 2010. There are 18 streets, secondary school, club and Great Patriotic War Memorial. It is located on the bank of the Kraishevka River, about 33 km from Yelan, the district's administrative centre. The village was founded in 1799 by migrant settlers from Kerensky Uyezd.

== Geography ==
Kraishevo is located within Khopyorsko-Buzulukskaya Plain, which is the Southern end of the Oka-Don lowland, on the bank of the Kraishevka River near its confluence into Tersa river. The altitude is about 110-120 meters above sea level. The village is located in the zone of steppes, on the border of alluvial-accumulative and glacial accumulative-denudation types of landscapes.

The floodplain and low terraces of the Tersa are characterized by plains, channels, rare small areas of oak and alder forests, grasslands, plots of agricultural lands. The overlying terrain is characterized by steppes, dry channels, plains, agricultural lands, plots meadow steppes, meadows, broad-leaved and small-leaved forests.

Soils in the Tersa floodplain are slightly acidic and neutral; higher up the plain slope, soils are humus of southern type.

Distance of route to the regional administrative center Volgograd is 310 km. Distance of route to the district's administrative centre Yelan is 33 km, direct distance is 18 km. Beryozovka is the nearest rural locality.

There is a water spring near the village.

=== Climate ===
Climate is humid continental — Dfb as per Köppen's climatic region classification.

== History ==
The village was founded in 1799 (in 1771 by another data) by migrant settlers from Kerensk District (Uyezd) of Penza Governorate. Primarily the village belonged to Naryshkins and later was transferred to the State Treasury. In 1808 the Treasury granted the village to major Ovsyanikov, who later sold it to major general Rusakov and court counselor Weber, and later from them the village was transferred to the State. Kraishevka village, also known as Troitskoye, is designated on the Detailed map of the Russian Empire of year 1816. The village was a part of Atkarsky District (Uyezd) of Saratov Governorate. In accordance with the Schematic map of Atkarsky District of year 1912, Kraishevka was a so-called volost village (village forming a municipality). The fair was organized here.

In accordance with the List of settlements of Atkarsky District of year 1914 (based on the year 1911 data) the village was settled by the former state peasants, ethnically Great Russians (Velikorosy), summarily 3452 men and 3568 women. In the village there were the church, 2 zemstvo schools, church school, hospital, reception hospital, market.

In 1928 the village was included into Yelan District of Kamyshin Area of the Lower Volga Province (Nizhne-Volzhskiy Kray). Kamyshin Area was abolished in 1930 and in 1934 the Lower Volga Province became Stalingrad Province (Stalingradskiy Kray). In 1935 the village was included into Vyazovka District. (In 1936 Vyazovka District was included into Stalingrad Province. In 1963, due to abolition of Vyazovka District, Kraishevo village was included into Yalan District. The village become the center of Kraishevo Selsoviet (rural council). Later Kraishevo became a part of Yelansky District of Volgograd Oblast.

== Culture and Education ==
There are two municipal organizations of culture and education in the village:

- Kraishevo Secondary School
- Kraishevo Culture and Library Center
