= Rtishchevo (inhabited locality) =

Rtishchevo (Russian: Ртищево) is the name of several inhabited localities in Russia.

Urban localities

- Rtishchevo, a town in Saratov Oblast; administratively incorporated as a town of oblast significance

Rural localities

- Rtishchevo, Moscow Oblast, a village under the administrative jurisdiction of Domodedovo Town Under Oblast Jurisdiction, Moscow Oblast
- Rtishchevo, Novoderevenkovsky District, Oryol Oblast, a village in Starogolsky Selsoviet of Novoderevenkovsky District of Oryol Oblast
- Rtishchevo, Verkhovsky District, Oryol Oblast, a selo in Russko-Brodsky Selsoviet of Verkhovsky District of Oryol Oblast
- Rtishchevo, Penza Oblast, a selo in Bolshelukinsky Selsoviet of Vadinsky District of Penza Oblast
- Rtishchevo, Yaroslavl Oblast, a village in Slobodskoy Rural Okrug of Danilovsky District of Yaroslavl Oblast
