= Antonina Scriabina =

Soviet teacher and public figure (1894–1977)

Antonina Vladimirovna Scriabina (Russian: Антонина Владимировна Скрябина; 1 March [O.S. 17 February] 1894 – 15 April 1977) was a Soviet teacher and public figure. She was named an Honored School Teacher of the RSFSR in 1940.

== Early life and education ==
Antonina Scriabina’s father came from the Galich-Arzamas branch of the ancient noble family of the Scriabins. Her mother was from the Ryazantsev family, nobles and hereditary honorary citizens of Russia. Scriabina graduated from the 8th grade of the Orel Women's Gymnasium. From 1913, she studied at the Faculty of Economics of the Moscow Commercial Institute.

During the World War I, Scriabina was a nurse at the front. Then she served as an instructor in the agricultural food census of the Moscow City Statistical Department. At the same time, Scriabina continued to study at the Moscow Commercial Institute, graduating in 1917.

== Career ==
Responding to the call of Nadezhda Krupskaya to the progressive Russian intelligentsia on March 4, 1918, Scriabina began to work as a teacher at the 4th Yauza Men's City School. Then she worked as a teacher in various schools in Moscow.

In 1931, Scriabina graduated from the Moscow Regional Pedagogical College, named after Profintern. During World War II, Scriabina was evacuated to the village of Verkhnyaya Chermoda (Osinsky district, Perm region) with her school and students. There she taught while developing public education and school construction. Scriabina was a school inspector and deputy of the district. In the post-war period, she continued her teaching activities in Moscow.

Scriabina was repeatedly elected a deputy of the Dzerzhinsky district of Moscow, chairman of the commission for elections to the Moscow Regional Council, a member of the Educational and Methodological Council under the Ministry of Education of the RSFSR. She was a member of the Society for Cultural Relations with Foreign Countries and other organizations. Her young naturalist circles were exhibitors of the All-Union Agricultural Exhibition (VDNKh) for many years, for which they were awarded medals, certificates and valuable gifts.

== Educational and methodical activity ==
Scriabina is the author of printed works on pedagogy and the organization of work with young naturalists, preschoolers and schoolchildren. Her book My Work with Young Naturalists went through two editions. She was the inventor of visual aids in biology for teaching at school. Scriabina repeatedly spoke to Moscow teachers at the Institute for the Improvement of Teachers, the Moscow State Duma, on the radio, and television, sharing the almost 50-year experience of her work at school.

== Family ==
Antonina Scriabina's father was Vladimir Pavlovich Scriabin (1854-1921), chief accountant of Count Sergei Vladimirovich Orlov-Davydov, her mother was Alexandra Nikolaevna Ryazantseva (1860-1923).

In 1917 Scriabina married Mikhail Antonovich Pyshkalo (1885-1941) Belarusian people's teacher, member of the Moscow Council (1923), and the school principal (1924). They had three children: Anatoly Mikhailovich Pyshkalo (1919 - 2000), Liudmila Mikhailovna Pyshkalo (married - Buravtseva; 1921 - 1987) and Irina Mikhailovna Pyshkalo (married - Sarakaera; born 1923).

== Awards and honors ==
- Order of Lenin (1944)
- Order of the Red Banner of Labour (1944)
- Medal "For Valiant Labour in the Great Patriotic War 1941–1945" (1946)
- Medal "In Commemoration of the 800th Anniversary of Moscow"
- Jubilee Medal "In Commemoration of the 100th Anniversary of the Birth of Vladimir Ilyich Lenin"
- Jubilee Medal "Thirty Years of Victory in the Great Patriotic War 1941–1945"
