= The Museum of One Painting named after G. V. Myasnikov =

Art museum in Penza, Russia

Coordinates: 53°11′01″N 45°00′58″E

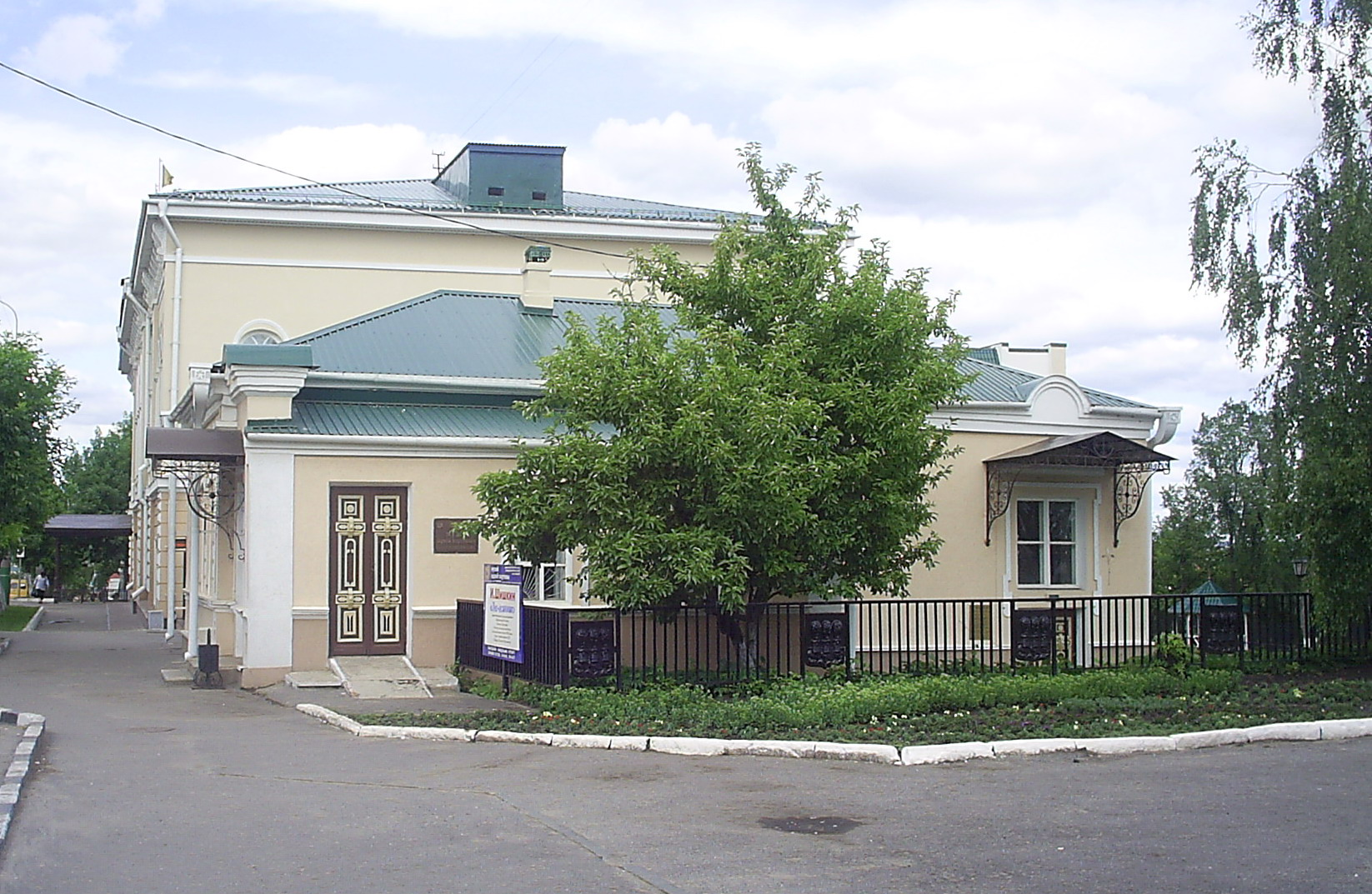

The Museum of One Painting named after G. V. Myasnikov is a state museum, located in Penza, Russia.

It is a unique museum, which does not have analogies anywhere in the world. Its peculiarity is that it does not have a permanent exposition and that it only shows one painting.

== Description ==
The museum contains only one hall, which introduces only one painting that is usually of great cultural significance. Before visitors can familiarize themselves with the painting, they watch a 45-minute film, describing the peculiarities of the exhibit, its history and the biography of the painter. Such a presentation, starred by famous Russian actors such as Mikhail Ulyanov, Vyacheslav Tikhonov, Rostislav Plyatt, Oleg Yefremov, Oleg Tabakov, Ya. Smolenskiy, provide visitors with the opportunity to plunge into the atmosphere of the times, when the painting was created, to become utterly absorbed by the critical points of the painter's life and to get acquainted with the major milestones of his work.

== History ==
The museum was founded in 1983 on the initiative of Georg Vasilyevich Myasnikov, the second secretary of Penza regional committee of CPSU On 2 March 2002, the museum was named after him, and now on the front of the museum's building you can see a memorial tablet bearing his name.

The museum has existed for about 25 years. During this time it has been visited by more than 400,000 people. The museum has presented such masterpieces as Taking a Snow Town by Vasily Surikov, Major's marriage proposal by Pavel Fedotov, The Father’s Greatcoat by Viktor Popkov, Spring by Arkady Plastov, Ship Grove by Ivan Shishkin, After the Battle by Kuzma Petrov-Vodkin, Portrait of a Young Woman by Titian, Abraham and the Three Angels by Rembrandt, The Magic Carpet by Viktor Vasnetsov.

== Interesting facts ==
In 2006 Archbishop of Penza Philaret offered to introduce the Icon of Our Lady of Kazan from the collection of the Diocese of Penza.

The museum building is considered to be an architectural monument of the 19th century.
