= Fyodor Uglov =

Russian surgeon (1904–2008)

- Фёдор Углов
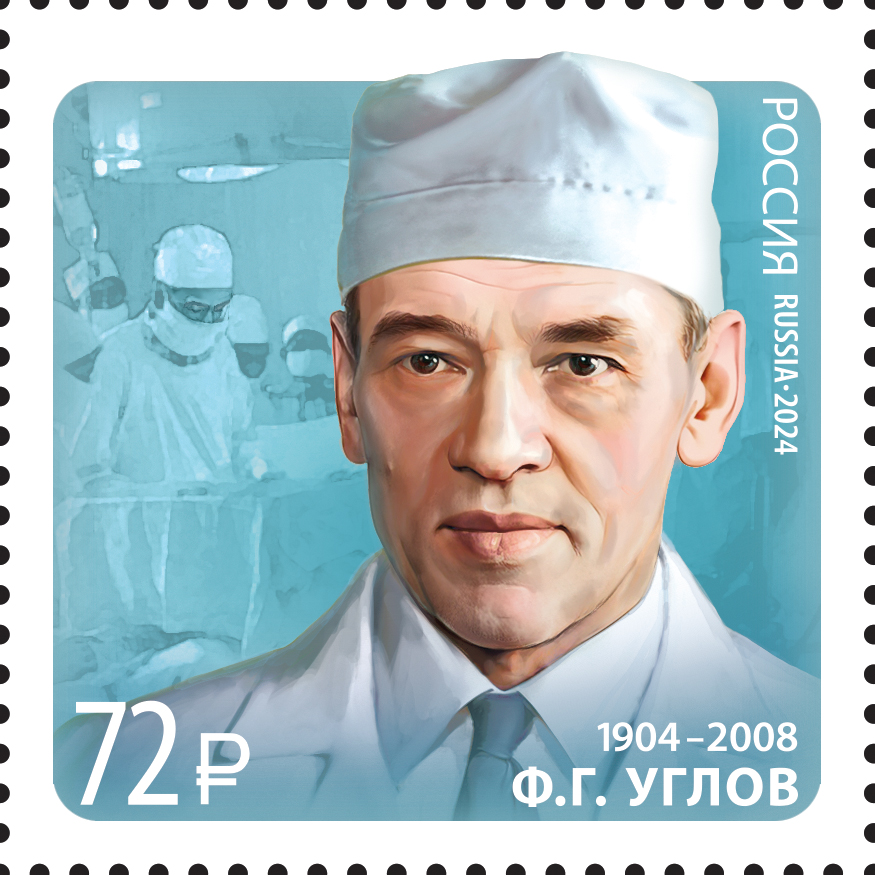
- Uglov on a 2024 Russian stamp
- Born: 5 October 1904; Kerensky Uyezd, Russian Empire
- Died: 22 June 2008 (aged 103); Saint Petersburg, Russia
- Education: Saratov State University; Irkutsk State Medical University
- Children: 5
- Awards: Lenin Prize; Order of the Red Banner of Labour; Order of the Patriotic War; Order "For Merit to the Fatherland"
- Scientific career
- Fields: Medical research; surgery
- Workplaces: First Leningrad Medical Institute; USSR Ministry of Health

Fyodor Grigorievich Uglov (Russian: Фёдор Григорьевич Углов; 5 October [O.S. 22 September] 1904 – 22 June 2008) was a Soviet and Russian surgeon. In 1994, he was listed by Guinness World Records as the oldest practicing surgeon in the world. He retired from practice at the age of 102.

== Biography ==
Uglov was born into a peasant family in Siberia near Lake Baikal. He was one of six children. Having matriculated from the Saratov State University in 1929, he later settled in Leningrad, where he saved lives of soldiers wounded during the Winter War. He worked as a surgeon in Leningrad throughout its epic 900-day siege by the Germans, "performing surgery – often without anaesthetic, electricity or water – as the bombs rained all around".

Uglov was one of the first surgeons in Russia to successfully perform complex operations on the esophagus and mediastinum to treat pancreatic cancer, lung diseases, congenital and acquired heart defects, and aortic aneurysm.

Beginning in 1950, he taught at the 1st Leningrad Medical Institute (now the First Pavlov State Medical University of St. Petersburg named after academician Ivan Pavlov). From 1950 to 1991, he headed the Department of Hospital Surgery No. 2 at the First Leningrad Medical Institute. Until 1972 he was the director of the All-Russian Research Institute of Pulmonology of the USSR Ministry of Health, and created a large surgical school. He also served as the editor-in-chief of Russia's oldest surgical journal from 1953 to 2006.

Uglov gained a measure of renown in the 1970s with a series of publications and tracts campaigning against alcoholism (e.g., "Suicides"). He was on the cutting edge of Mikhail Gorbachev's ill-fated prohibition campaign, touring the country with his lectures and winning a Lenin Prize for his activities. In his 1986 book, Uglov claimed drunkenness was not characteristic of the Russian people until the 19th century when it was introduced and supported by Jews with the aim of undermining the Russian national character. Uglov later blamed the failure of the 1986 anti-alcohol campaign on a conspiracy between the bureaucracy and Jews in the media opposing the idea of sobriety. In addition to alcohol and tobacco, Uglov also classified rock music as drugs, the spread of which, in his opinion, was supported by the Order of the Illuminati.

Uglov retired from medical practice at the age of 102.

== Personal life ==
Uglov was married four times. His first wife was Vera Mikhailovna, a gynecologist. The couple met when they were studying in the same group at the university. Uglov became seriously ill with typhoid and sepsis and Vera cared for him. They were married in 1926 and went on to have three daughters: Tatiana, Edita and Elena (1934-2010). His grandson Mikhail Vladimirovich Silnikov is a physicist. His third wife was Eremeeva Irina and his fourth wife was Emilia Viktorovna Uglova-Streltsova (born August 14, 1936), a cardiologist. He married Emilia in 1964 and their son Grigory was born on June 10, 1970.

Uglov was a devout Orthodox Christian and a close friend of Metropolitan John, the Archbishop of Leningrad/St Petersburg.

== Legacy ==
- On October 7, 2014, the grand opening of a public garden named after Fyodor Uglov took place in St. Petersburg. The square is located at the intersection of Lev Tolstoy and Roentgen streets, in front of the windows of the hospital surgery clinic of the current State Medical University, which was headed by Uglov for many years.
- On October 7, 2016, a monument to Fedor Uglov was erected near St. Petersburg State Medical University. The monument depicts a medical worker half-bending over a patient. The words of Uglov are inscribed on the pedestal: "The work of a doctor is extremely humane and noble".
- "Akademik Fedor Uglov" is one of five mobile consultation and diagnostic centers of Russian Railways.

== Publications ==
- The Surgeon's Heart (1974)
- Under the White Robe (1984)
- Take Care of your Health and Honor from a Young Age (1988)
- A Century is Not Enough for a Man (2001)
- The Truth and Lies About Legal Drugs (2004)
- Shadows on the Roads (2004)
- Memoirs of a Russian Surgeon: One Revolution and Two Wars (2015)

== Monographs ==
- "Lung Resection" (1950, 1954)
- "Lung Cancer" (1958, 1962; translated into Chinese and Polish)
- "Teratomas of the presacral region" (1959) (co-authored with R. A. Mursalova)
- "Diagnostics and treatment of adhesive pericarditis" (1962) (co-authored with M. A. Samoilova)
- "Surgical treatment of portal hypertension" (1964) (co-authored with T. O. Koryakina)
- "Complications during intrathoracic operations" (1966) (co-authored with V. P. Pugleeva, A. M. Yakovleva)
- "Cardiac catheterization and selective angiocardiography" (1974) (co-authored with Yu. F. Neklasov)
- "Pathogenesis, clinical picture and treatment of chronic pneumonia" (1976)
- "Basic principles of syndromic diagnosis and treatment in the activities of a polyclinic surgeon" (1987)

He authored more than 600 articles in scientific journals.
