= Taking a Snow Town =

1891 painting by Vasily Surikov

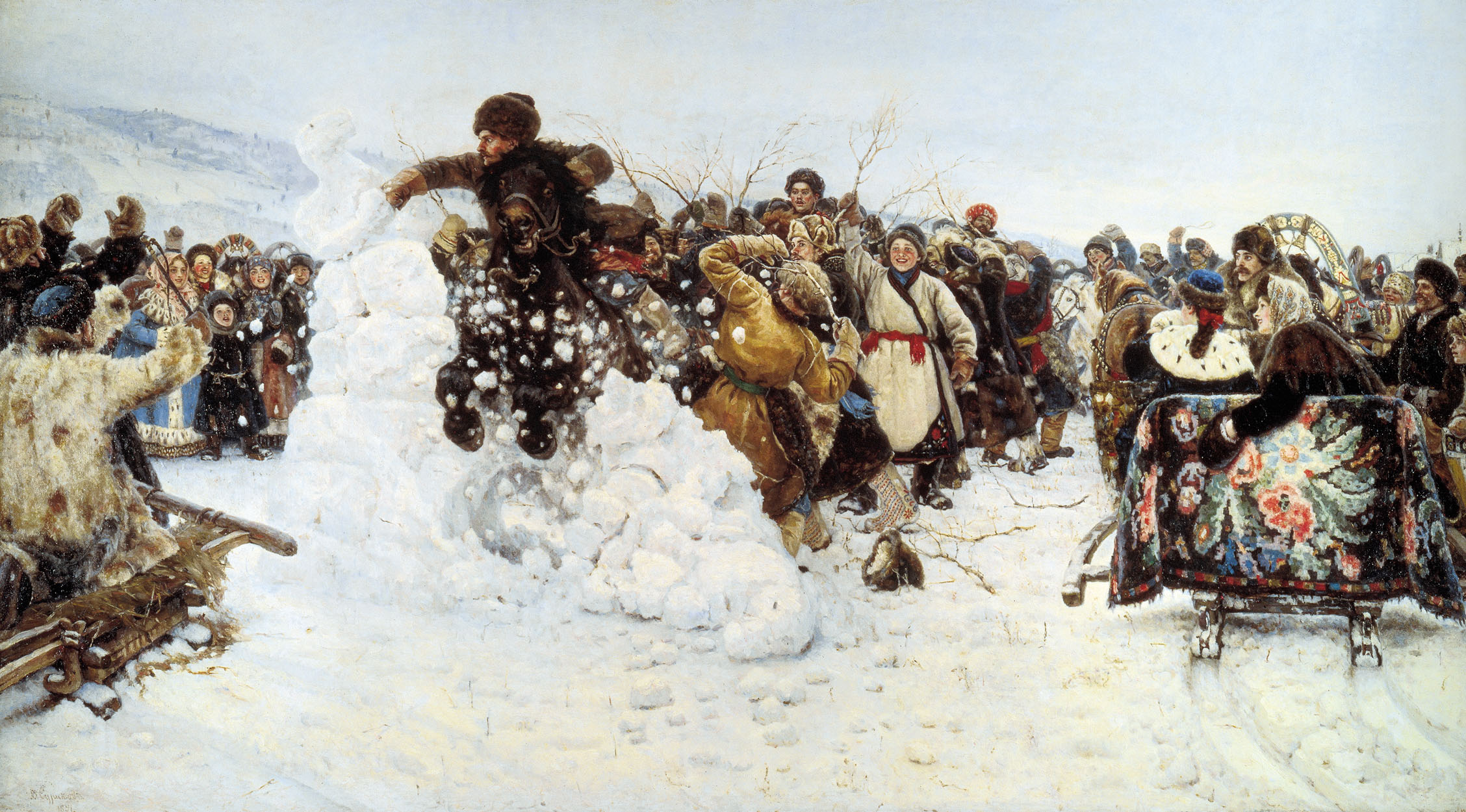
- Artist: Vasily Surikov
- Year: 1891
- Medium: Oil on canvas
- Dimensions: 156 cm × 282 cm (61 in × 111 in)
- Location: Russian State Museum, Saint-Petersburg

Taking a Snow Town is a painting by the Russian artist Vasily Surikov (1848–1916), completed in 1891. It is kept in the State Russian Museum in St. Petersburg (inventory Zh-4235). The size of the canvas is 156×282 cm. The painting depicts the climax of an ancient folk game popular among the Siberian Cossack community. According to tradition, the game was organized on the last day of Maslenitsa, and the artist, who grew up in Krasnoyarsk, observed it many times during his childhood. Surikov worked on the canvas during his stay in Krasnoyarsk from 1889 to 1890, and finished it after his return to Moscow. Many of his relatives and acquaintances served as sitters.

The painting Taking a Snow Town was presented at the 19th exhibition of the Peredvizhniki Society Travelling Exhibitions, which opened in March 1891 in St. Petersburg. In 1899 the canvas was bought from the artist for 10 thousand rubles by the collector and art patron Vladimir von Mekk. In 1900 the painting was part of the Russian exposition at Exposition Universelle in Paris, where it was awarded a personal medal, and in 1908 several paintings from von Meck's collection, including Taking a Snow Town, were purchased for the collection of the Russian Museum of Emperor Alexander III (now the State Russian Museum).

The critic Vladimir Stasov noted that Surikov's work "though far from being equal to his magnificent painting Boyaryna Morozova, probably belongs to the most remarkable paintings of the Russian school". The artist and critic Sergei Goloushev (literary pseudonym — Sergei Glagol) considered the painting Taking a Snow Town a high point in Surikov's work as a painter". The art historian Vladimir Kemenov called Taking a Snow Town a joyful and cheerful picture. In his opinion, the artist managed to convey "sincere passion of the Siberian game", as well as the image of the people, in which "huge reserves of heroic forces, cheerfulness, fun are bubbling".

== History ==
=== Previous events and the working process ===
In the summer of 1887, after completing the painting Boyarda Morozova, Vasily Surikov, together with his wife Elizaveta Augustovna and daughters Olga and Elena, went to his native Krasnoyarsk, where his mother Praskovya Fedorovna and brother Alexander lived. There he stayed until late autumn, made many sketches of urban and peasant life, and painted a large portrait of his mother (now in the State Tretyakov Gallery). At the end of the trip, Surikov planned to create a large canvas on Siberia, but his creative plans were interrupted by his wife's serious illness. Apparently, the trip to Siberia affected her health, and she died a few months after their return to Moscow, on April 8, 1888. Surikov was deeply affected by his wife's death; in a letter dated April 20, 1888, he wrote to his brother: "Since February 1, Lisa's illness began, and I have not had a moment of peace to write a word to you. [...] I, brother, am going mad. On April 8, at 2.30 o'clock, on Friday, the fifth week of Lent, she, my little dove, was gone. [...] It's hard for me, brother Sasha. [...] Here, Sasha, my life is broken; what will happen next, and I cannot imagine".

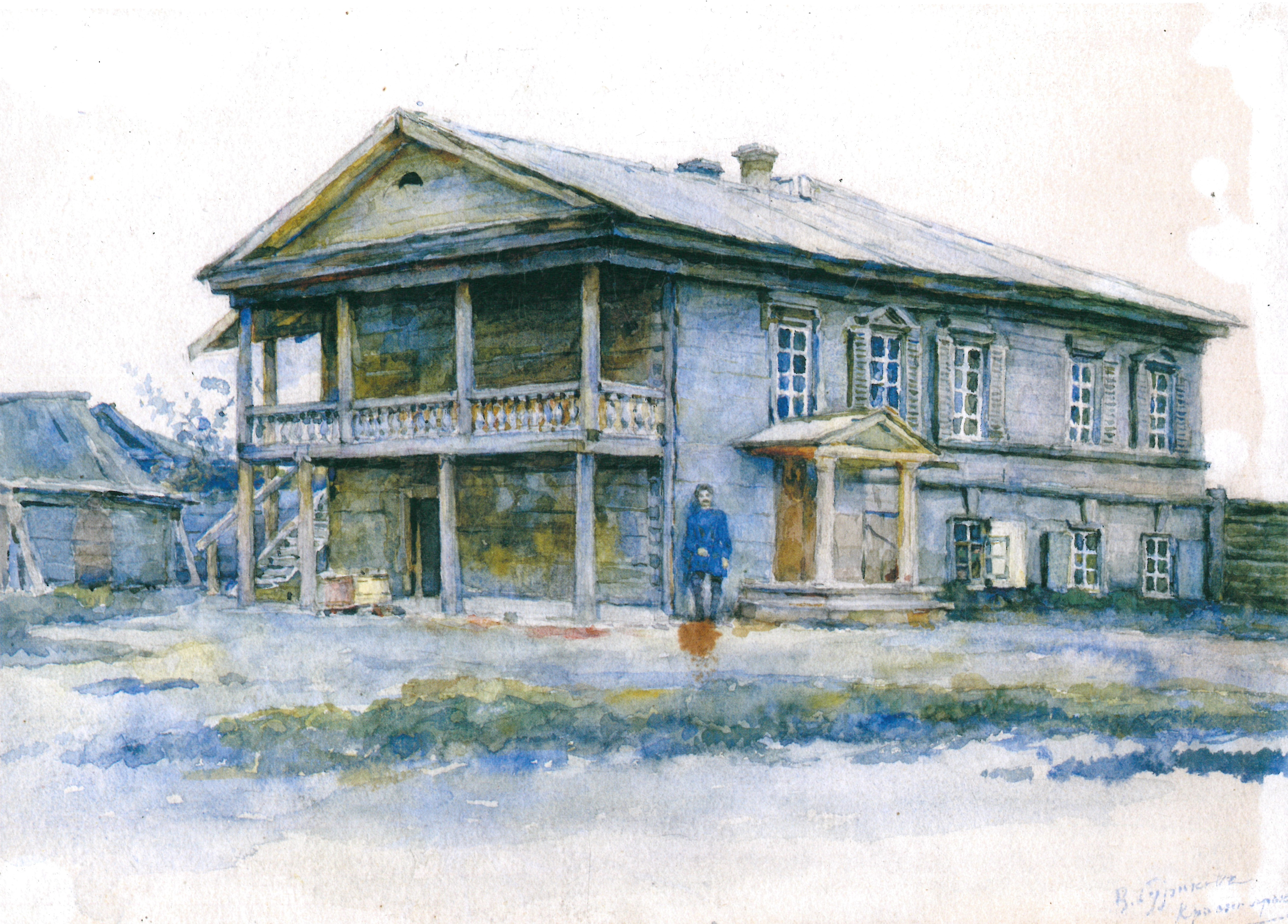
V. I. Surikov. The Surikov House in Krasnoyarsk (1890, KCCM)

In order to change the environment and to distract himself from heavy thoughts, in May 1889 Vasily Surikov came back to Krasnoyarsk with his daughters, where this time he lived for about a year and a half. The girls studied at the gymnasium, and the artist's brother Alexander tried with all his might to entertain Vasily and restore his interest in life and creative activity. Almost every day they drove around the city or visited its suburbs, places known to the artist since childhood. Life among people close to him, familiar surroundings, trips to the countryside and fresh impressions of Siberian nature: all this contributed to the acquisition of peace and health, the restoration of creative forces. Surikov returned to work — painted portraits of his relatives and friends, old Krasnoyarsk houses, mountain landscapes and views of the Yenisey, as well as various scenes from the life of Siberians. According to his own recollections, quoted by Maximilian Voloshin, he "went to Siberia", "shook himself up", "and then turned from drama to great cheerfulness".

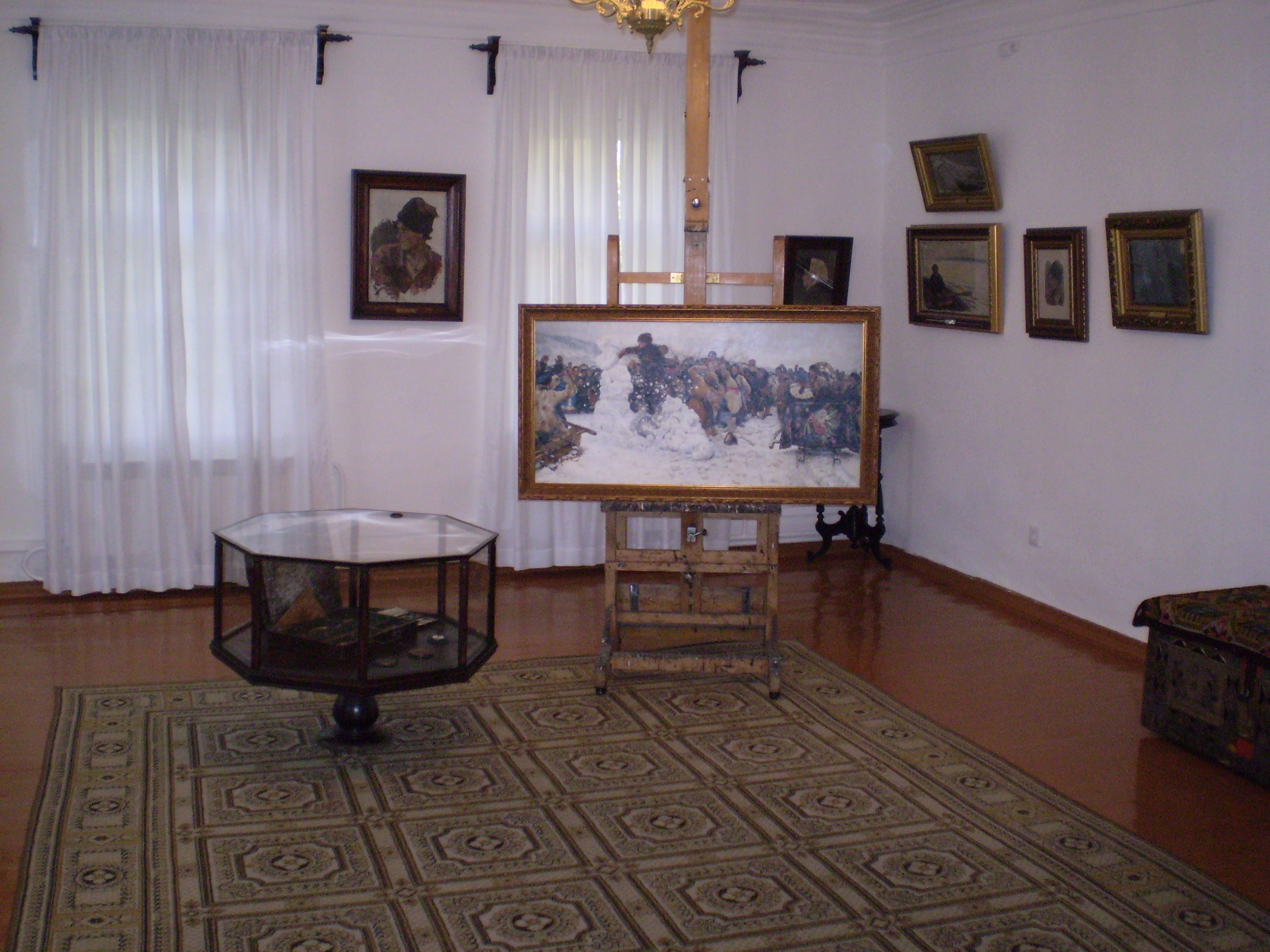
The artist's studio at the Surikov Museum in Krasnoyarsk.

It was then that Vasily Surikov had the idea of painting a large canvas on the theme of "taking a snow city" — an ancient folk game popular among the Siberian Cossack community. The last day of Shrovetide was spent by many Krasnoyarsk residents in the surrounding villages, where "cities" with crenelated walls, snow cannons and figures were built out of snow and ice. The participants were divided into defenders and attackers. A rider on horseback had to break through the ranks of the town's defenders, break through the gate, and knock down a snow bar. In the past, the "town's taking" were being organized in the village of Torgoshino were particularly famous, and by the late 1880s or early 1890s "towns" could be found only in the villages of Ladeiki and Beryozovk. Surikov's relatives on his mother's side, Praskovia Fyodorovna (née Torgoshina) lived in Torgoshino. The artist said that in his childhood years he repeatedly observed this folk entertainment: "Beyond Krasnoyarsk, on this bank of the Yenisei, I saw for the first time how the 'city' was taken. We were coming from Torgoshins. There was a crowd. A snowy city. And a black horse passed me by, I remember. That's right, it's in my picture and it stayed".

Surikov worked on the picture in Krasnoyarsk. According to Alexander, the artist's brother, "for the work of this painting Vasya has become less bored with his wife, in a word, to some extent came to his senses, began to visit and we had acquaintances". In 1890, during Shrovetide, Vasily and Alexander visited the village of Ladeiki (also called Ladeika or Ladeyskoye), located not far from Krasnoyarsk. At the artist's request, the young people of Ladeyskoye built a snow city and organized its "capture" — this performance cost the brothers "three buckets of vodka". From nature, Surikov made several sketches in color and pencil. According to some sources, the staging of the capture of the Snow Fortress took place in the courtyard of the Surikovs' house-museum in Krasnoyarsk — there local Cossacks took part in the construction of the city. When he was working on the painting, the sitters were his brother Alexander, his great-niece Tatiana Domozhilova, Ekaterina Rachkovskaya and many other acquaintances.

Surikov began work on the large canvas in the largest room of his house in Krasnoyarsk. A few months later, in the fall of 1890, the artist returned to Moscow from Krasnoyarsk, taking with him a canvas rolled up on a shaft. In a letter to his mother Praskovya Feodorovna and his brother Alexander in early 1891, Vasily Surikov wrote: "I put the painting in a gold frame. It is very beautiful now. I have finished it. Soon, in the beginning or middle of February, it will be sent to an exhibition in St. Petersburg. I don't know what impression it will make. My brother, I have not shown it to anyone yet".

=== The 19th Travelling Exhibition ===
The painting Taking a Snow Town (with the subtitle Old Cossack game in Siberia on Maslenitsa) was presented at the 19th Exhibition of the Society of Travelling Art Exhibitions ("Peredvizhniki"), which opened in St. Petersburg on March 9, 1891, and moved to Moscow in April. After that, Surikov's canvas travelled with the exhibition to Kharkiv, Kyiv, Elisavetgrad, Odesa, Chișinău, and Poltava. The painting aroused special interest in the public, also because at the two previous exhibitions of the Partnership (17th and 18th) the artist's works were not exhibited. In addition, the surprise (and sometimes confusion) of the artist's contemporaries was caused by the fact that in the new painting Surikov departed from his "tragic role", which could be attributed to his previous large-format works — The Morning of the Streltsy Execution and Boyarda Morozova.

The reviews of Taking a Snow Town that appeared in the periodical press during the exhibition were heterogeneous. Some critics mentioned among the defects of the painting "unsuccessful composition", "dirty tones", colorful and suboptimal choice of colors. The author of an article about the exhibition, published in the newspaper Russkie Vedomosti, wrote: "It is a pity and a nuisance that the current picture of Mr. Surikov causes nothing but determined confusion; it is difficult to understand how the artist could place such a trifle in such a dimensional framework". Moreover, some reviewers considered Surikov's painting to be "a work of purely ethnographic character". The publicist Nikolai Mikhailovsky in "Letters about various differences", published in the issue of Russkiye Vedomosti of March 26, 1891, noted that "with some surprise one stops in front of Mr. Surikov's huge canvas", so everything in it is "bright, colorful, noisy, so many people", and asked the question: "How did this crowd of happy, disheveled people get here? The critic Alexei Suvorin, in an article published in the issue of Novoe Vremya of March 15, 1891, praised the artist for the cheerfulness and zador expressed in the "purely Russian physiognomies" in the picture, but criticized the too bright coloring of the canvas: "In the picture cuts the eye only hard motley colors. In its whole is like a carpet, which is hanging in it on the back of the sleigh on the right, and the individual figures of the crowd merge with it into something motley, solid, multi-headed, like a hydra ..." Surikov's work was highly appreciated by the critic Vladimir Stasov. In the article "A snow city in Siberia", published in April 1891 in the magazine Severny Vestnik, he noted the originality of the canvas, as well as its "oriental look", which consisted in the fact that "types, faces, costumes, felt-patterned boots, mossy and squat horses, even the colors are a little motley, but attractive — all some kind of oriental, not ours, and yet Russian half".

=== Next events ===
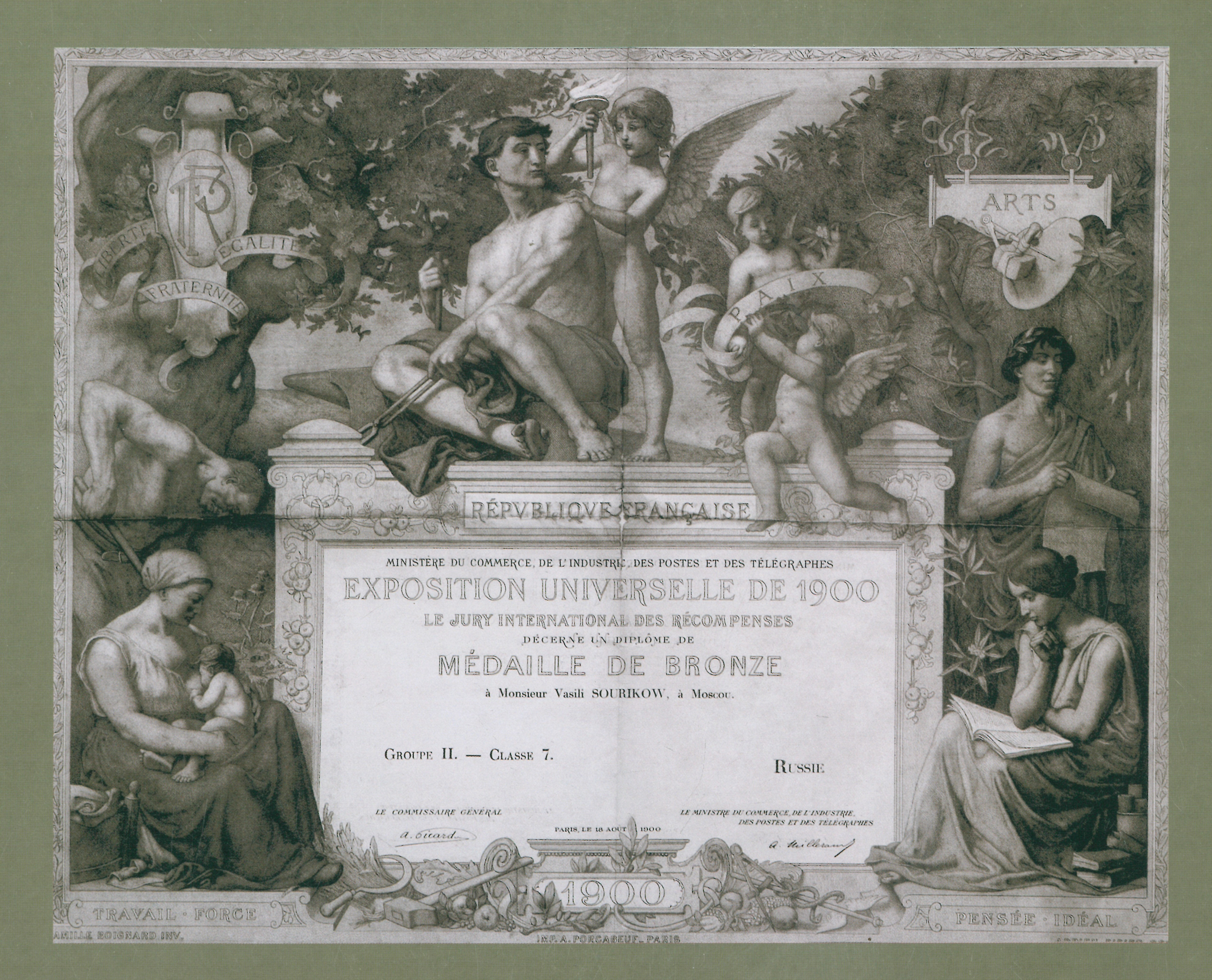
Diploma of V. I. Surikov to the medal of the World Exhibition in Paris 1900

In 1899, the collector and art patron Vladimir von Mekk bought the painting Taking a Snow Town from the artist for 10 thousand rubles. In a letter to his brother Alexander dated June 3, 1899, Vasily Surikov reported that the painting had been sold to von Meck in May, "the money part he gave me, and the rest in September". In 1900, the painting was part of the Russian exposition at the World Exhibition in Paris, where it was awarded a bronze (according to other sources, a silver) medal. In the catalog of the Paris exhibition, the canvas appeared under the French title "L'Assaut d'une ville de neige" and was the only work by Surikov presented.

In 1908 a number of paintings from the von Mekk collection were sold, including Surikov's Taking a Snow Town and Golden Autumn by Isaac Levitan, Venice by Mikhail Vrubel, Siberia by Apollinariy Vasnetsov and Radonitsa by Abram Arkhipov were purchased for the collection of the Russian Museum of Emperor Alexander III (now the State Russian Museum). The art historian Dmitry Tolstoy, who was a co-director of the Russian Museum in 1901-1918, played an important role in the purchase of paintings from Mekk.

During the World War II, some paintings from the collections of the State Russian Museum were evacuated. Among them was the painting Taking a Snow Town. In July 1941, the museum's exhibits, prepared for evacuation, were sent to the Moscow railway station, then on a special train accompanied by military guards to Gorky (now Nizhny Novgorod), and then along the Volga and Kama rivers to Molotov (Perm). There they were placed in the Molotov Regional Picture Gallery (now the Perm State Art Gallery), located in the building of the Perm Transfiguration Cathedral. After the end of the war, the exhibits were returned to the Russian Museum — boxes with large paintings arrived there in April 1946. In 1959 the canvas was restored — the work on the restoration of the painting was carried out by the leading restorer of the State Russian Museum Anany Brindarov.

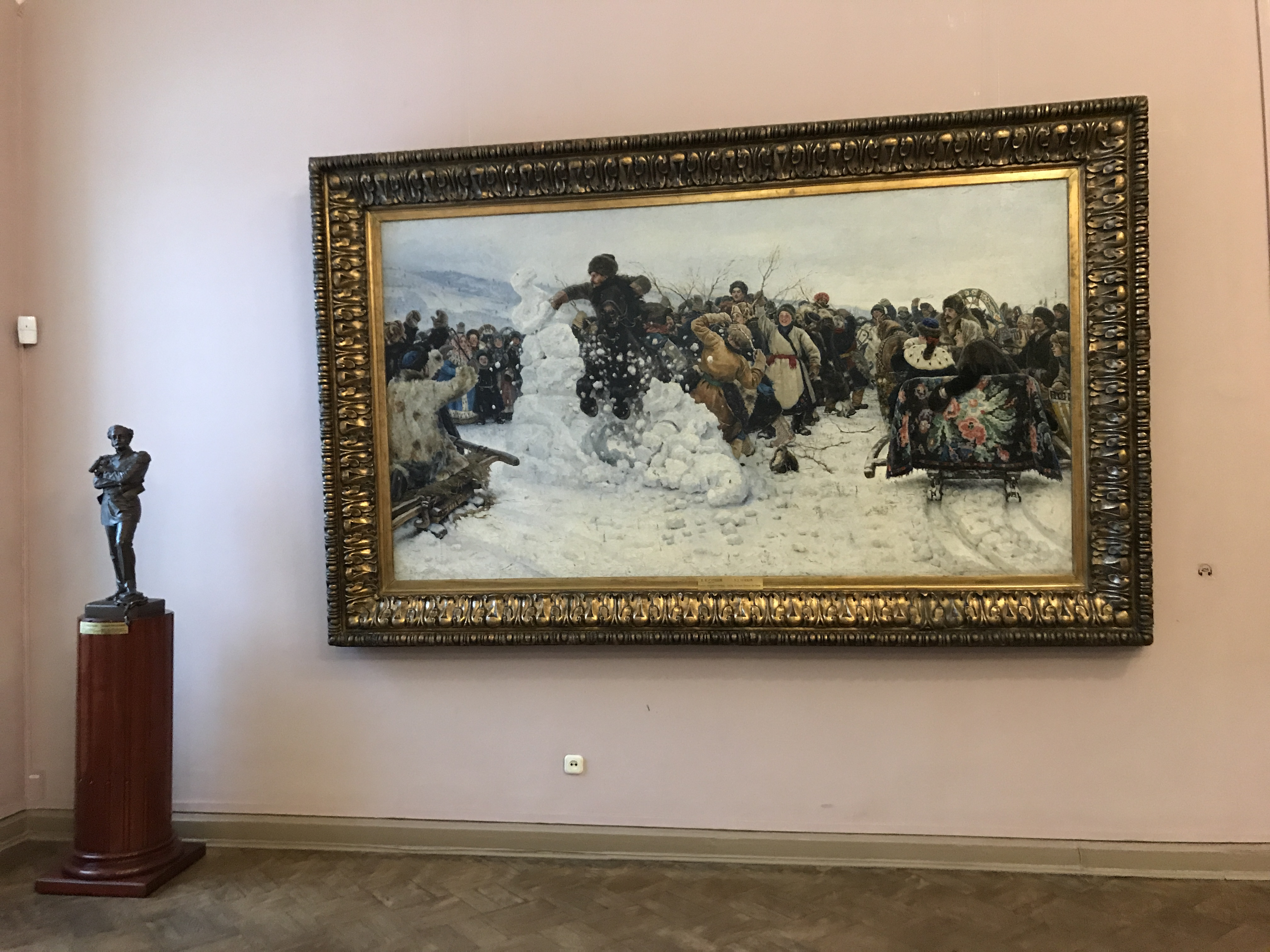
The painting Taking a Snow Town in the State Russian Museum of Fine Arts

In 1983, the painting Taking a Snow Town was in Penza, where it became the first exhibition of the newly opened Museum of One Painting (a branch of the Penza Regional Picture Gallery named after K. A. Savitsky). On the occasion of the 125th anniversary of the creation of the painting, the exhibition "Painting with a strong character" was organized in the Krasnoyarsk State Art Museum named after V. I. Surikov, which was held from December 24, 2015 to March 20, 2016. The exhibition presented seven painting studies for this painting — four from the collection of the State Tretyakov Gallery and three from the collection of the Surikov Estate Museum. In addition, the exhibition showed household items and details of holiday costumes, close to those depicted in Surikov's painting. The exhibition also included seventeen traditional folk carpets from the collection of the Tyumen Museum of Fine Arts, the drawings of which contained various improvisations on the theme of a bouquet of flowers. The V. I. Surikov Krasnoyarsk State Museum of Art held an exhibition from February 20 to April 28, 2019, entitled Surikov. Taking of a Snow Town, where the original canvas from the collection of the State Russian Museum was exhibited. The exhibition showed more than 60 paintings and graphic works of Surikov.

At present, "Taking a Snow City" is exhibited in Hall No. 36 of the Mikhailovsky Palace, where other works of Vasily Surikov are also exhibited, including Suvorov crossing the Alps and Yermak's Conquest of Siberia.

== Description ==
The painting depicts the climax of the ancient game — the moment when one of the attackers on horseback managed to break through the lines of the defenders and reach the snow fortress. In the center of the canvas is the little town, with its defenders next to it. They hold whips and ratchets with which they try to scare away the enemy's horses. On the edges of the painting there are smiling and lively spectators who are watching the game with interest. All the figures in Surikov's multi-figure painting "create a solid, unified impression of a jubilant crowd actively participating in a successful game and joyfully welcoming the victory of their comrade". The artist himself later recalled: "In Taking a Snow Town I wrote what I myself had seen many times. I wanted to convey in the picture the impression of a peculiar Siberian life, the colors of its winter, the prowess of Cossack youth". The painting's composition consists of three parts, which can be considered as based on the theatrical technique of "triptych": the most active action takes place in the central opening, and in the side (peripheral) parts there are spectators, and some of them turned their backs on the principle of backstage.

In the center of the painting is a dashing start of a rider on a horse, who destroys the wall of the snow fortress, and completes the victory with a powerful fist blow. Art historian Vladimir Kemenov noted that "the rider and horse are depicted in the most difficult perspective, flying straight at the viewer, surrounded by heaving clumps of snow. It was quite difficult for the artist to depict the movement of a horse rushing forward with its chest, and his brother Alexander, together with his buddy, "five times made a township in his yard and called the Cossack who, bucking his horse, flew to the township". According to the art historian Elena Bezyzvestnykh, the central figure, sharply distinguished in the composition of the canvas "enlargement of the figure and silhouette", is "the main nerve and node of tension" and "absolutely no-nonsense personifies the fierceness of the battle". In this case, the horseman is not in the center of the canvas, but slightly shifted to the left, dividing the canvas horizontally into "unequal sections on the principle of the golden section". According to one data, the main character of his painting —"the winner of the city"— Surikov wrote by the Krasnoyarsk stove-maker Dmitry, according to others — by the Torgoshinsky Cossack Strizhnev; it is possible that the image of the horseman combines the features of both sitters.

The horse a man rode into town is of Siberian breed — dark, big-headed, short and stocky. The rider and his horse have "complete mutual understanding". So much so that before jumping, the rider lets go of the bridle, "giving his faithful friend full freedom and relying on his instincts". The horse's eyes were still excited by the shouts of the crowd and the blows of the city's defenders, but "at the same time, an expression of some cheerful mischief was already shining" — its nostrils were wide and its mouth was open, so that "a semblance of a smile appeared on its muzzle". According to Vladimir Kemenov, "Surikov almost humanizes the horse: in his painting, not only the rider, but also the horse looks like a full participant in the fun that is inherent in the sense of the game, moreover, the horse and the horse itself feel pleasure from the game".

Fragments of the painting Taking a Snow Town

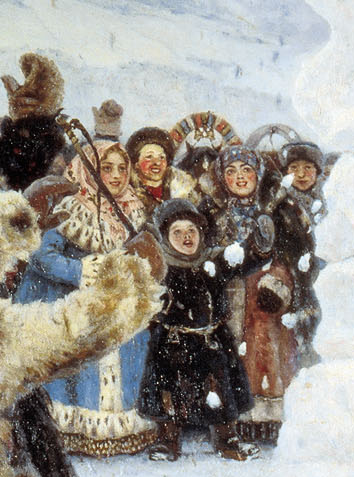
Spectators in the left part of the painting

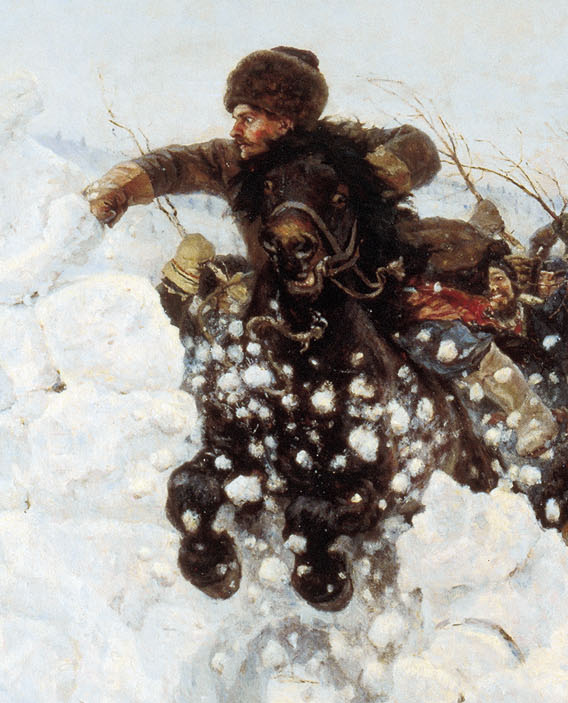
Rider on a horse

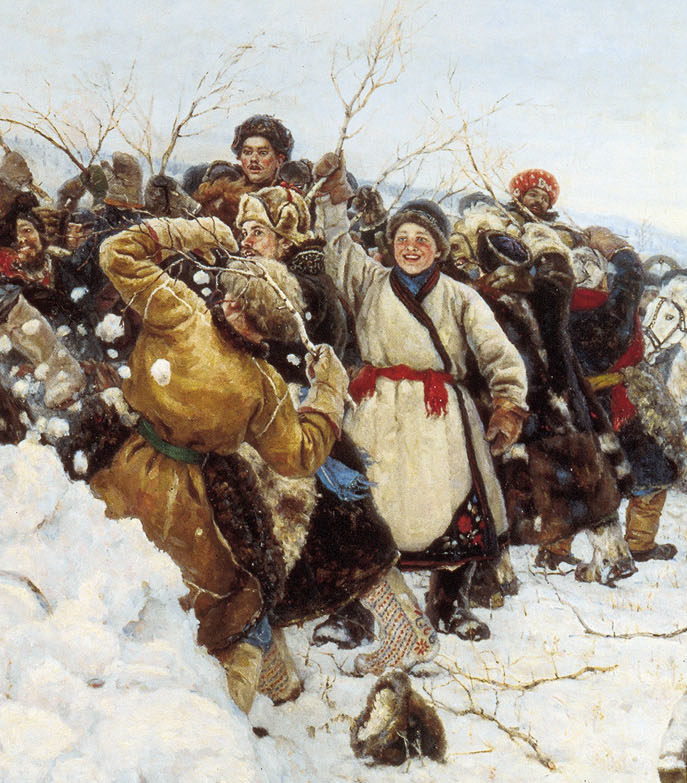
Fortress defenders with whips

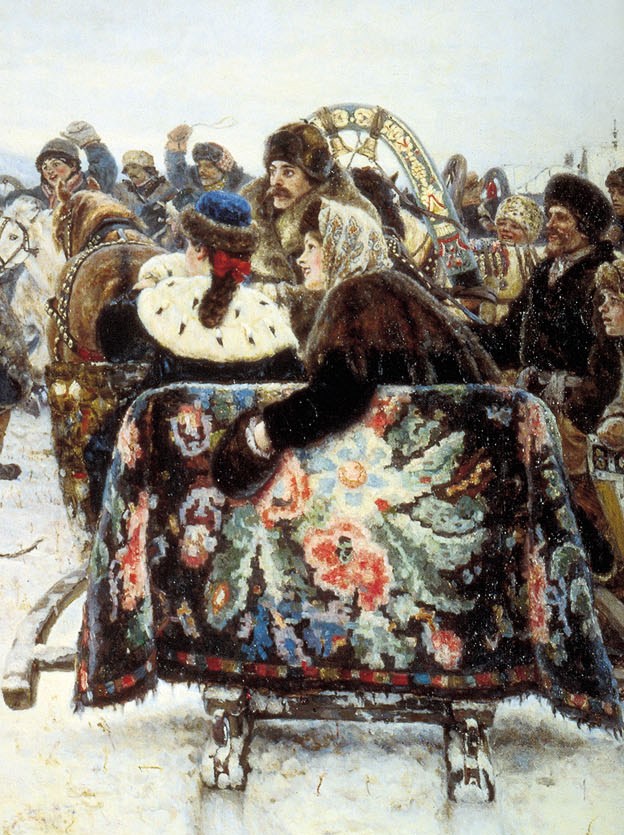
Spectators in the right part of the painting

The first rider is followed by others; their movement is from the depth to the center of the canvas, from right to left. A total of six horsemen can be distinguished in the painting. The second horseman, whose head rises above the crowd of defenders, Surikov wrote about his Krasnoyarsk acquaintance Alexander Pestunov. A watercolor sketch Alexander Nikolayevich Pestunov has been preserved, the resemblance to which confirms the identity of the sitter. The model for the third horseman, distinguished by his bright red hat, was another acquaintance of Surikov — the Ladeysky Cossack Evgraf Yakhontov.

Among the defenders of the city stands out the figure of a peasant in a white coat, belted with a red sash. His ruddy face "is lit up with a smile and glows with joy and admiration for the skill of the Torgashin Cossack. He raises his hand with a whip, not intending to strike, but already greeting the winner. Compared to the sketch Peasant with a twig, in the final version the artist portrayed the peasant "more youthful, cheerful, seized by the cheerful intoxication of life". Another defender, in a red coat, swung so hard for a blow that his hat flew from his head in excitement.

The pictures of the spectators are also interesting. A man in a fur coat and fur hat, sitting on a sled in the right part of the canvas, Surikov wrote from his brother Alexander (according to some reports, a light brown sable coat was specially taken for work on the painting in the Krasnoyarsk Museum of Local Lore). With her back to the audience, in the same sled sits a woman in a blue hat with beaver trim and stoat pelerine — the artist painted her after his great-niece Tatiana Domozhilova, a teacher at the Krasnoyarsk Diocesan Women's School. To her right, a woman in a dark fur coat is sitting with a muff on the colorful carpet that covers the back of the sleigh. The sitter for her was Ekaterina Rachkovskaya, the wife of the Krasnoyarsk doctor Pyotr Rachkovsky. Above her head there is a green bow (an element of horse harness) with a painted decorative pattern and Valdai bells. At the very right edge of the canvas there is the yellow back of a light city sleigh (the so-called "visors"), in which there is a man in a fur coat and a beaver hat (his surikov was written by Ladeysky Cossack Ivan Perov). Surikov painted one of the spectators —a man in a dog's coat in the woodpile on the left, raising both hands in joy— from the peasant Mikhail Nashivoshnikov (according to some sources he was from the village of Dronino, according to others — from Ladeek). Among other viewers, the writer Gennady Gor and the art historian Vsevolod Petrov emphasized the girl in a blue coat with a border of white fur depicted in the left part of the painting, according to them, in her poetic appearance "one feels something fairy-tale", "she looks like Snegurochka and reminds one of those lyrical, full of true beauty creatures of folk imagination, which is so rich in Russian folklore".

The vibrant colors of the Tyumen carpet spread across the back of the sled, shown in the right part of the painting, serve as a kind of "tuning fork" that determines the color scheme of the entire canvas. The pattern of the carpet contains multicolored (red, blue, blue, white, green) flowers and leaves woven on a dark background. Carpets of this type were widespread in Siberia, they were used in home interiors, as well as to insulate sledges. The artist used the bright decoration of the rug to enhance the general atmosphere of cheerfulness that prevailed during the Shrovetide festivities he depicted. According to the art historian Eleonora Gomberg-Verzbinskaya, "in this cheerful painting, the carpet on the sled is as important as any figure". Attracting the viewer's attention, the carpet is a kind of counterbalance to the dynamic composition of the central part of the canvas. The art historian Vladimir Kemenov wrote that in this "wonderfully written tapestry" with a special power "exuberant joy of colors and at the same time a fine artistic taste" are expressed. According to Kemenov, "this favorite of Surikov's, the Tyumen carpet, is a true masterpiece of folk rug making".

The Siberian winter landscape plays an important role in the composition. In the right part of the painting, the snow-covered roofs of a Siberian village can be seen above the heads of the viewers. In the middle and left parts of the canvas, mountain ranges recede toward the horizon, their outlines lost in the soft, airy haze. The canvas depicts a cloudy day, characteristic of a Siberian winter. There is no bright sunlight in the painting, the snow does not shimmer and sparkle. According to the art historian Viktor Nikolsky, the Siberian cloudy day depicted by Surikov is not ordinary, it is "somehow more transparent and colorful than in Moscow and Leningrad", the cloud cover is thinner and less frequent, the light seems more diffuse; although the sun is not visible, it "scatters some fine ash-pearl dust, which perfectly reveals the power of the colored spots", but at the same time does not lead to strong contrasts of light and shadow. According to Vladimir Kemenov, the snow depicted in the painting is not snow that has just fallen, but "field snow, lying, dense, with fragments of twigs, with protruding stalks of red grass". In the left part of the canvas the snow has a bluish tint, but in general in the painting it is painted in a warmer color scheme with the use of golden pink and slightly yellowish shades.

== Sketches for the painting ==
In the State Tretyakov Gallery there are four sketches for the oil painting Taking a Snowy Town: Portrait of a Young Woman in a Coat, with a Muff (1890, 31×26,5 cm, inventory no. 15105, from the collection of I. U. Matveev, received in 1933 from the OGPU), Head of a Laughing Girl (1890-1891, 32,5×26,5 cm, inventory no.25577, received in 1933 from the OGPU). Matveev, received in 1933 from the OGPU), Head of a Laughing Girl (1890-1891, 32.5×26.5 cm, inventory no. 25577, received in 1910 by M. A. Morozov's will), Peasant with a Branch (1890-1891, 37.8 × 23 cm, inventory no. 15094, received in 1924 from the 5th Proletarian Museum) and Cossack Uryadnik E.M. Kobyakov (1891, 39×27 cm, inv. 784, acquired from the author by P.M. Tretyakov). Vladimir Kemenov called A Laughing Girl as "an incomparable sketch" and "a true jewel of Surikov's painting". Assuming that this sketch was intended to work on the image of one of the female spectators on the left side of the painting, Kemenov wrote that it "remained essentially unused", as the artist refrained from detailed psychological characterization of the representatives of this group.

Sketches for the painting Taking a Snow Town

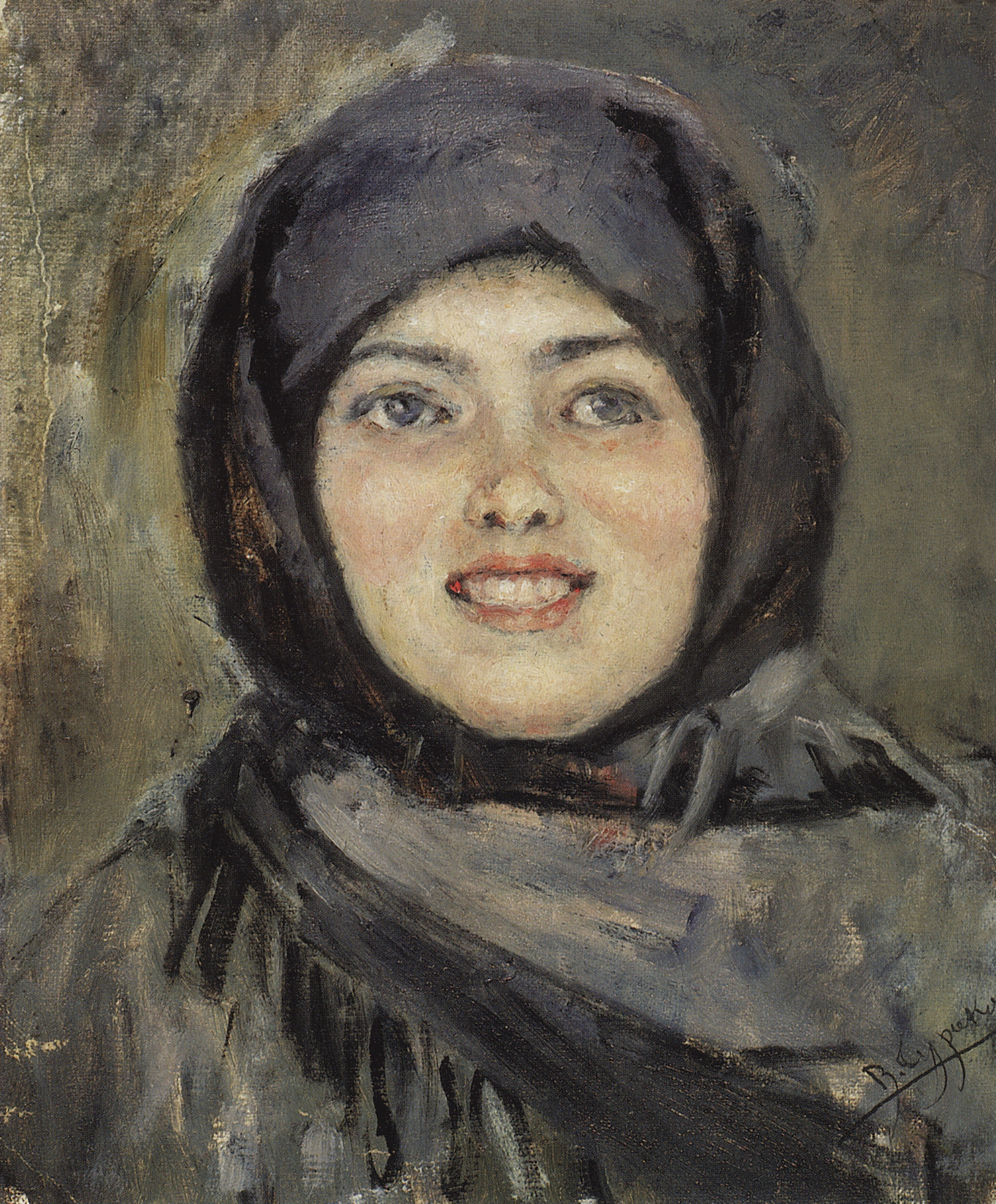
A Laughing Girl's Head (1890-1891, State Tretyakov Gallery)

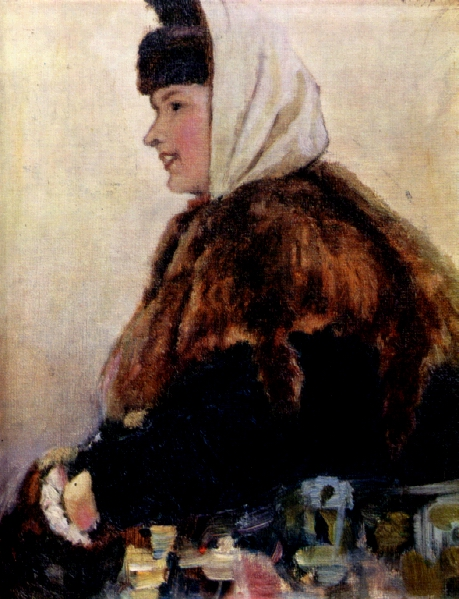
Portrait of a Young Woman in a Coat with a Muff (1890, State Tretyakov Gallery)

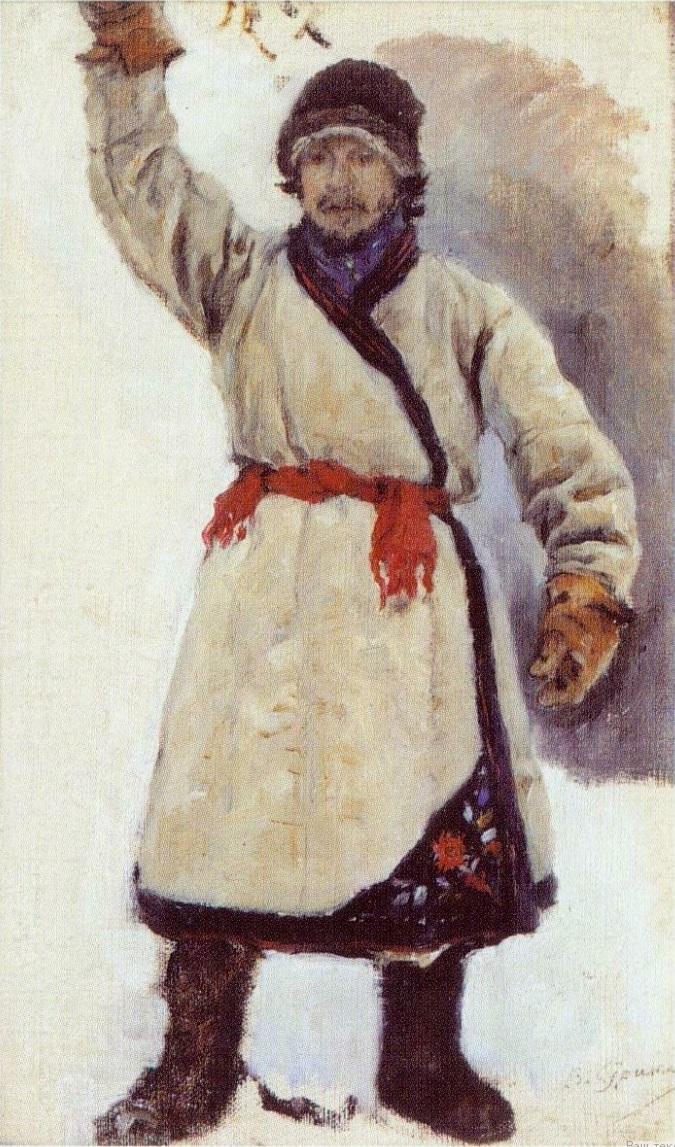
A Peasant with a Shank (1890-1891, State Tretyakov Gallery)

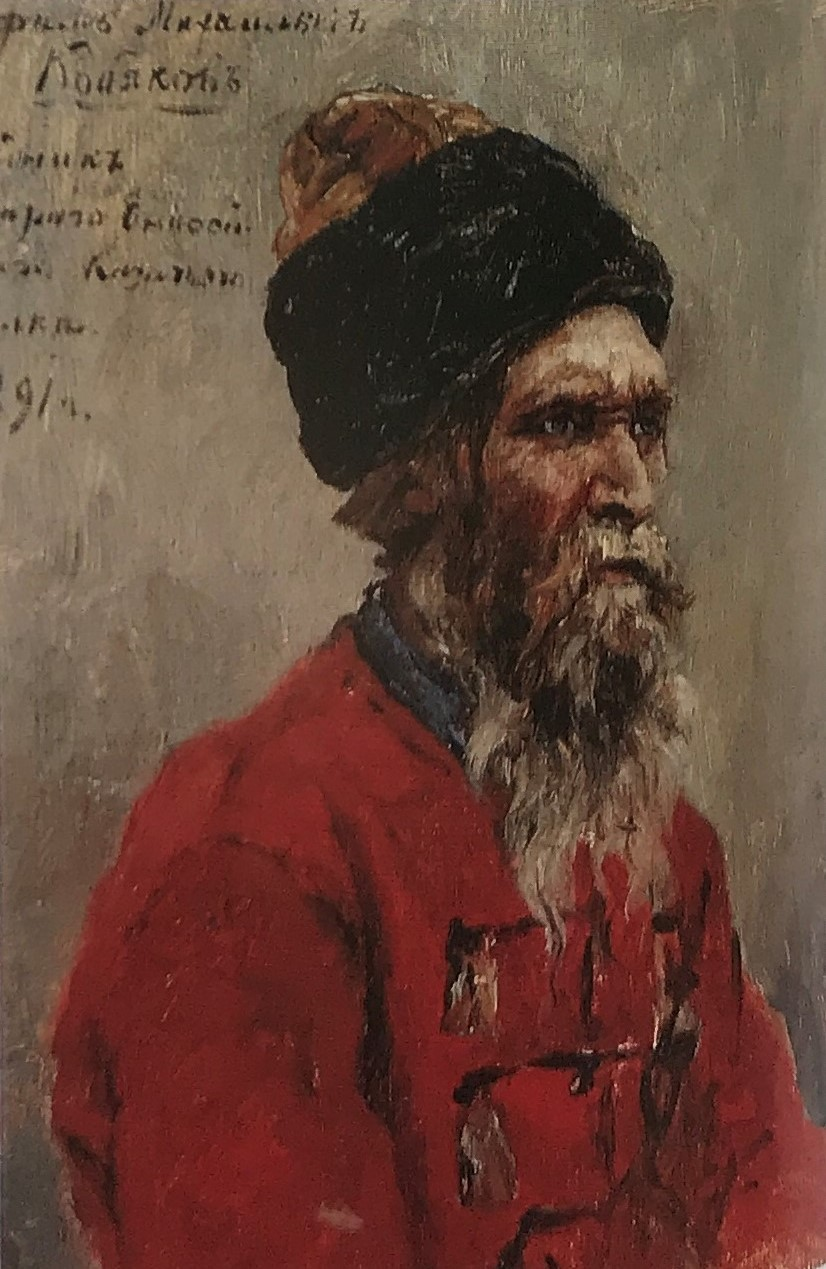
Efim Mikhailovich Kobyakov, a Cossack ranger (1891, State Tretyakov Gallery)

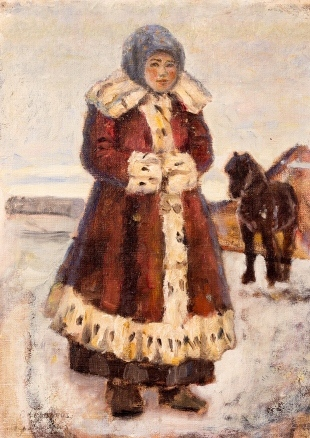
A Girl in a Fur Coat (about 1889, Surikov's House-Museum)

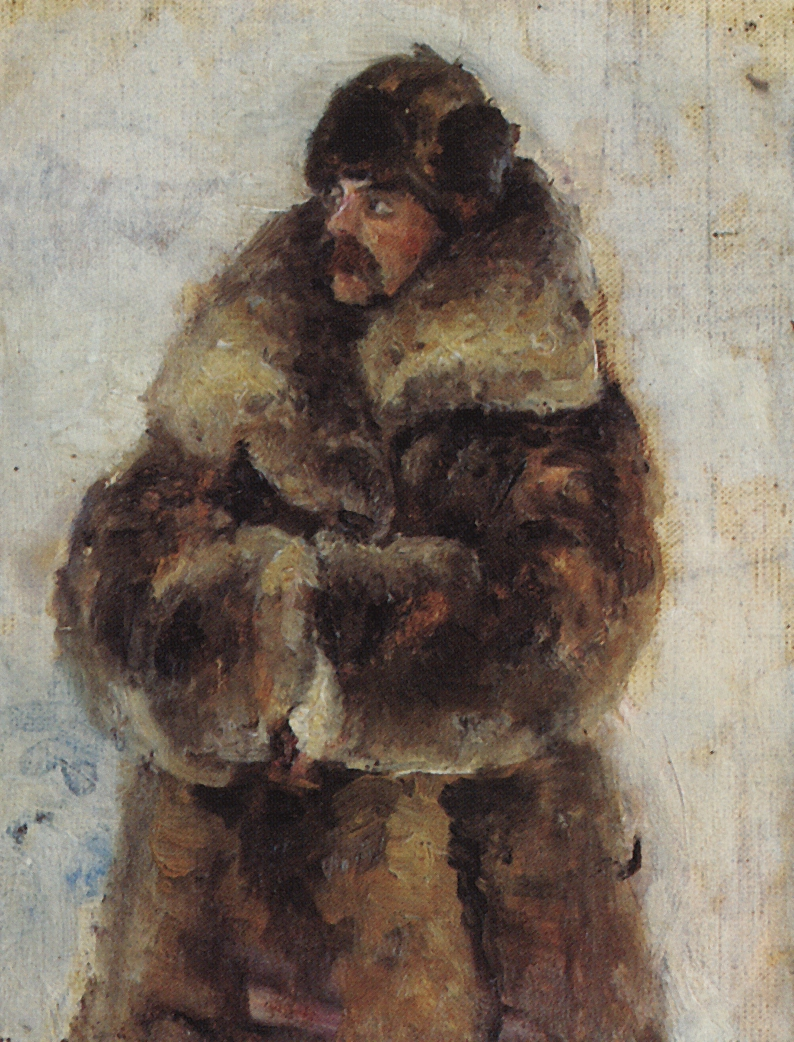
Alexander Surikov in a fur coat (1889, Surikov's House-Museum)

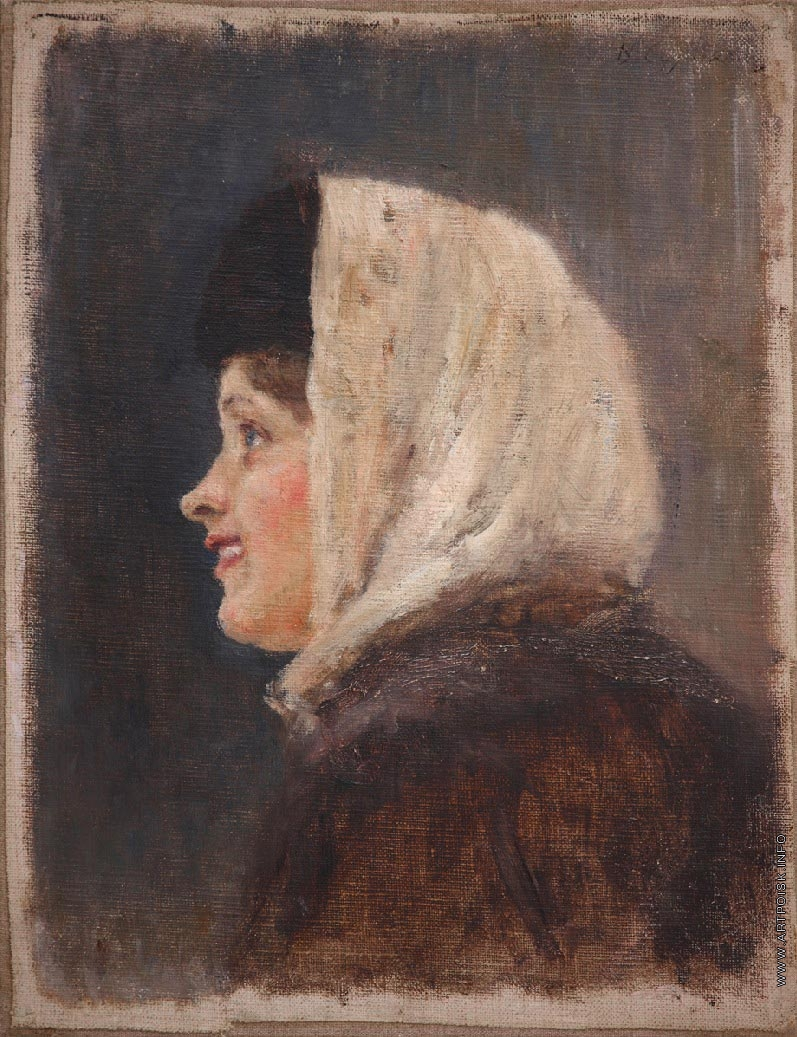
Ekaterina Alexandrovna Rachkovskaya (1889-1890, Surikov's House-Museum)

There are three sketches for the painting Taking a Snow Town in the collection of the museum estate of V. I. Surikov in Krasnoyarsk — Surikov in a fur coat (1889-1890, canvas, oil, 29×22 cm), Girl in a fur coat (about 1889, canvas, oil) and a Portrait of E. A. Rachkovskaya (1889-1890, canvas, oil, 32x24 cm). In the collection of the Vyatka Art Museum, named after V. M. and A. M. Vasnetsovs, there is a sketch Rider (1890, oil on canvas, 35×26 cm), where the "winner of the city" is depicted galloping not on a black, but on a white horse. In addition, in the collection of the Pushkin State Museum of Fine Arts there are two pictures of male figures, probably sketches for the painting Taking a Snow Town, but there are doubts that they were painted by Surikov.

Surikov also created watercolor studies for the painting Taking a Snow Town, among them Portrait of Alexander Nikolayevich Pestunov (1890, 19.1×14 cm, State Tretyakov Gallery, formerly in the Tsvetkovskaya Gallery), Head of a Boyaryshnitsa (1890, 19.5×14 cm, Tula Regional Art Museum) and Winter Hats (or simply "Hats", 1889-1890, 24×27.2 cm, Krasnoyarsk State Art Museum named after V. I. Surikov). V.I. Surikov State Art Museum). The 1937 exhibition catalog also mentions the watercolor study "Peasants. Drawing of heads" (1889-1890, 24,8×33,8 cm) and the graphic study Portrait of E. Rachkovskaya. Two sketches (graphic pencil, 1889-1890, 24,9×33,7 cm, collection of the artist's family, Moscow).

Watercolor studies for the painting Taking of the Snow Town

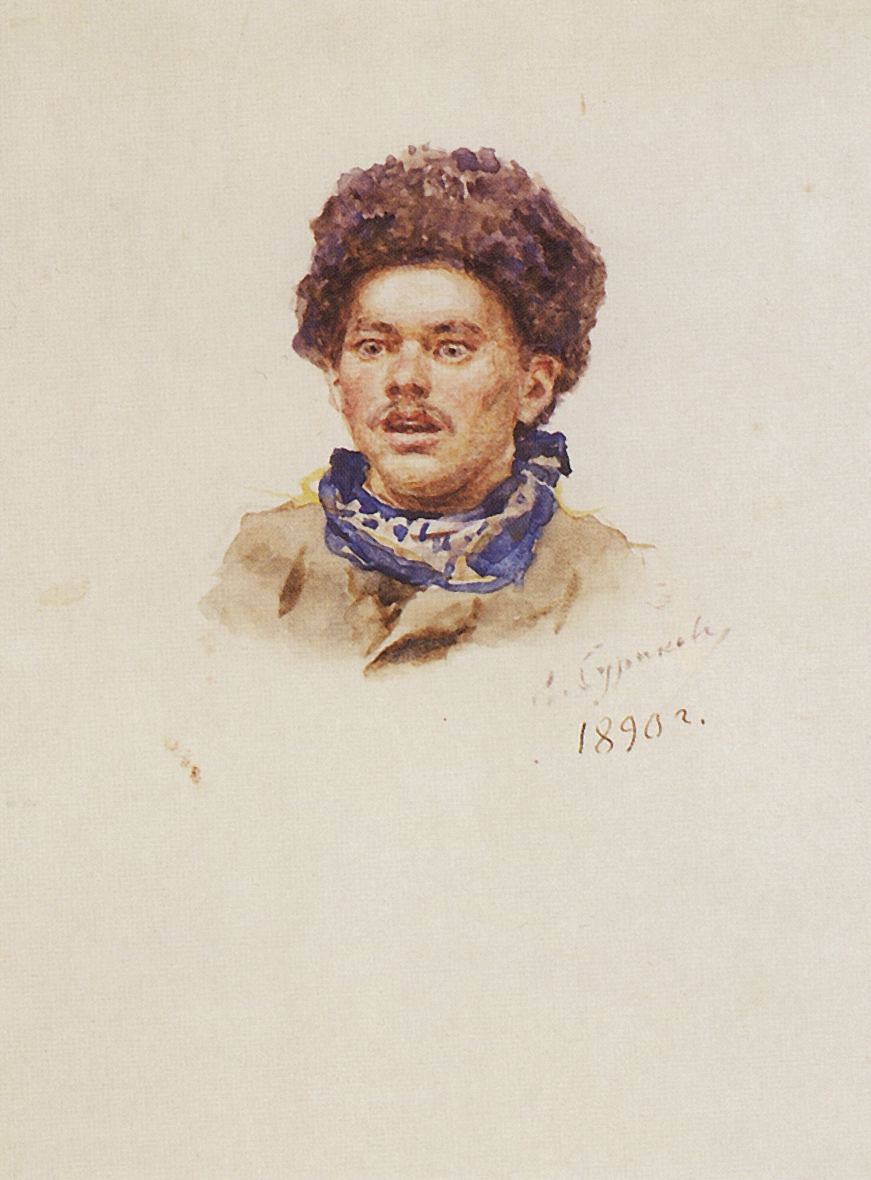
Portrait of A. N. Pestunov (1890, State Tretyakov Gallery)

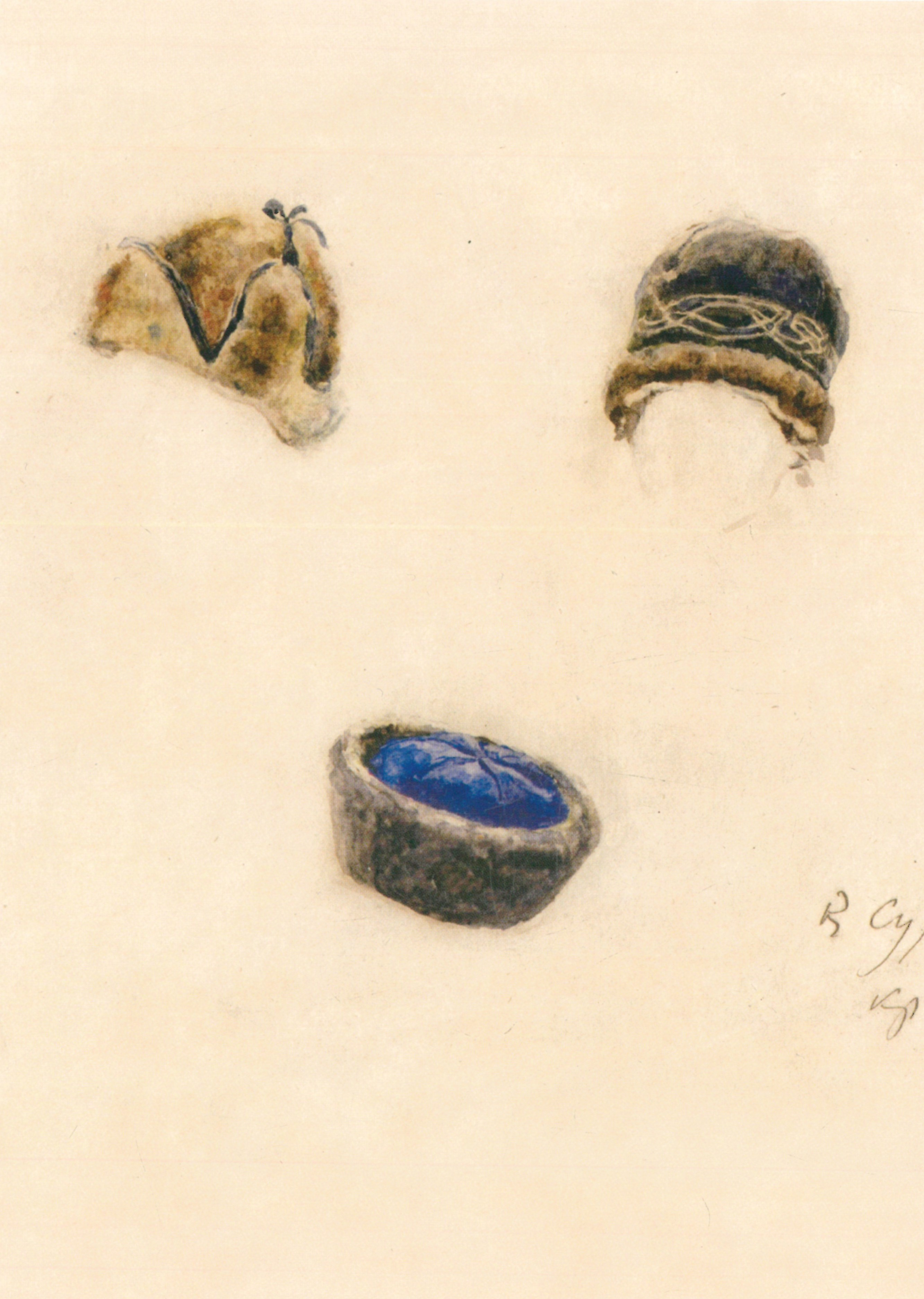
Winter Hats (1889-1890, Surikov Krasnoyarsk State Museum of Art)

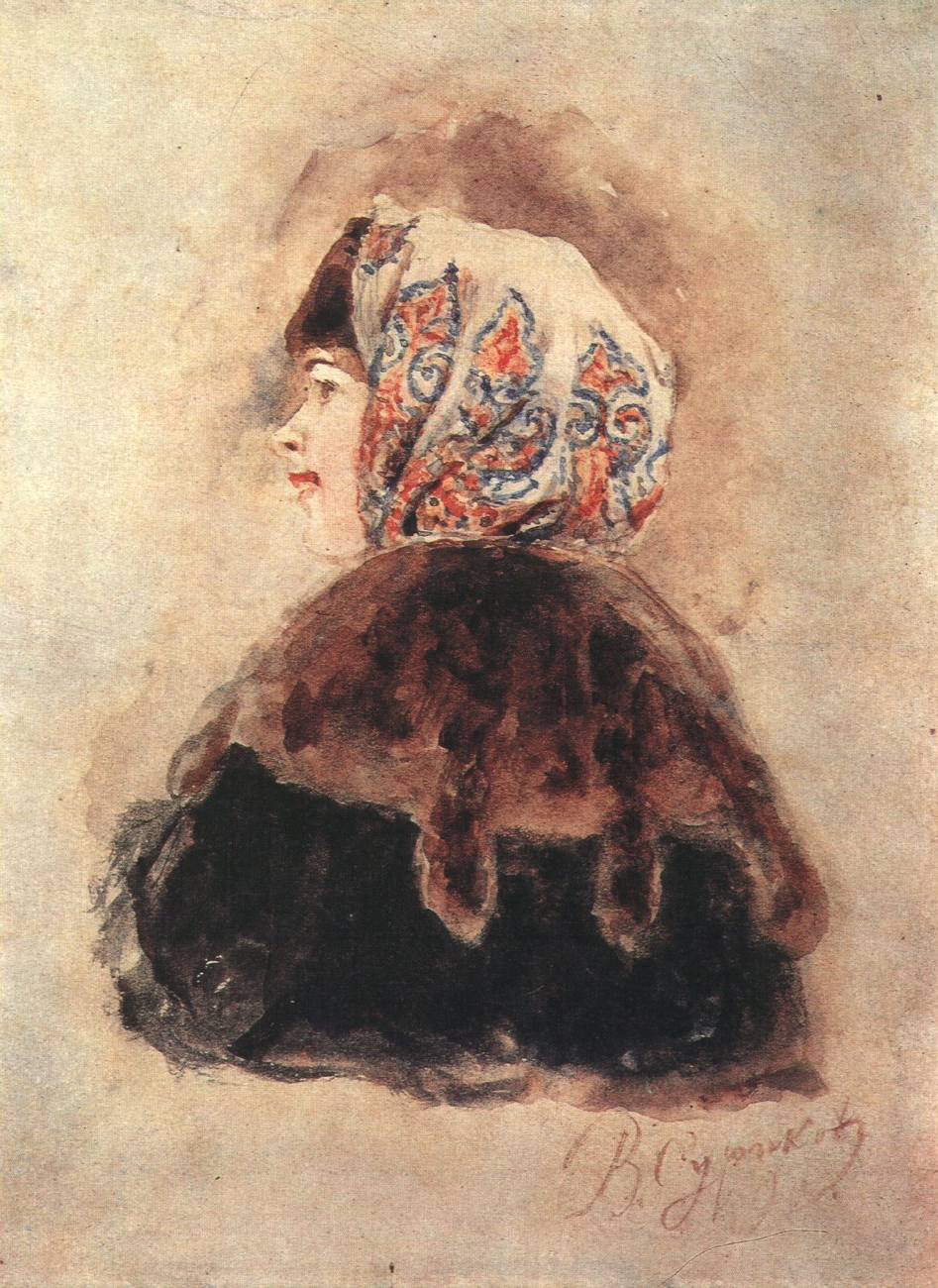
A Boyarda's Head (1890, Tula Regional Art Museum)

== Reviews and critics ==
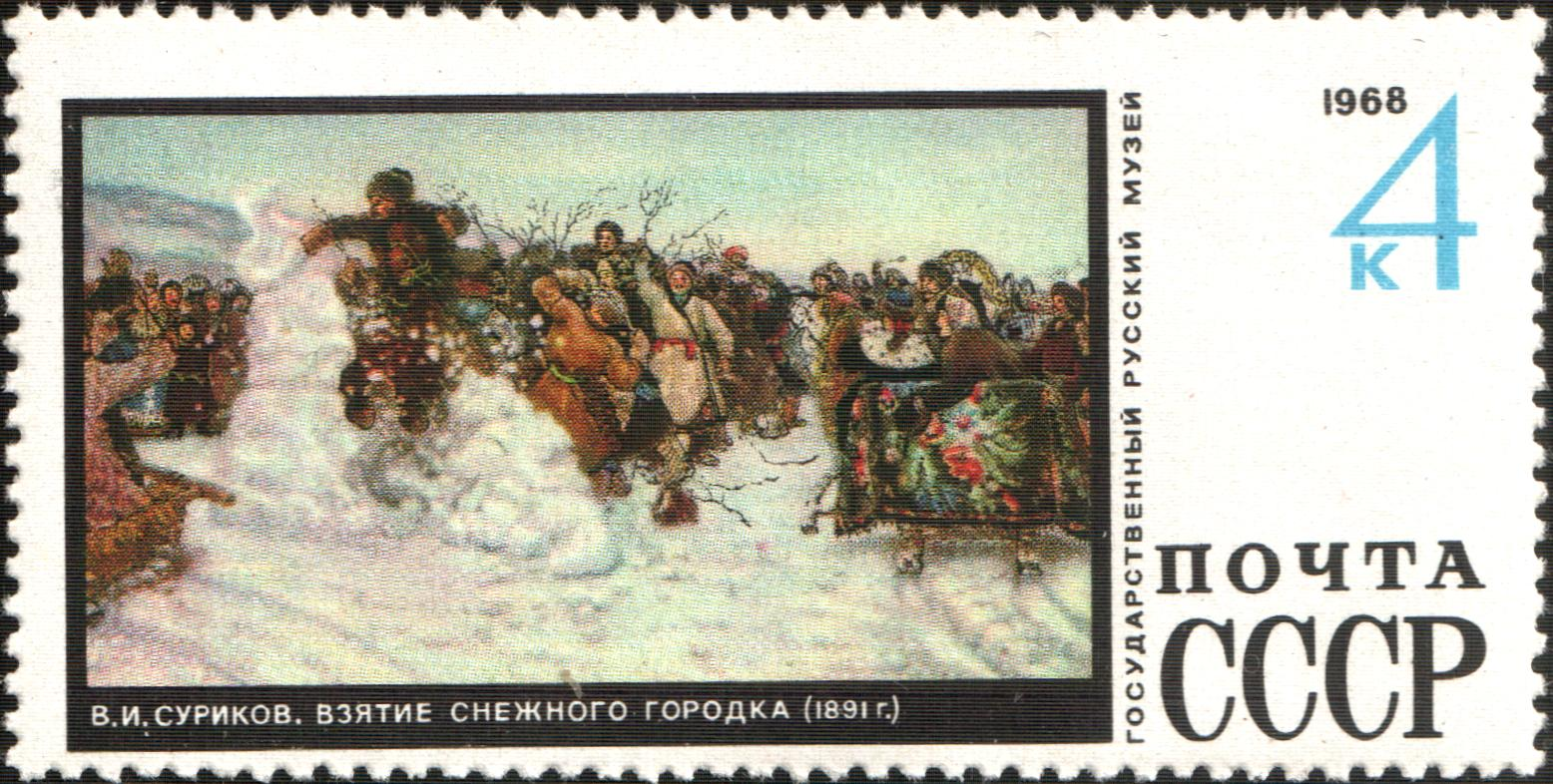
The painting Taking a Snow Town on a 1968 USSR postage stamp

In the 1890's, the art critic Vladimir Stasov wrote that Surikov's painting Taking a Snow Town depicts "a modern domestic scene, interesting and characteristic". According to Stasov, the author of the painting — "Siberian born, and knows, like no one else, tamoshnyaya his homeland and tamoshnyaya people". Describing the spectators depicted in the painting, Stasov noted their beauty, health, freshness, cheerfulness, youth and grace. In his opinion, although this work by Surikov "is far from being equal to his magnificent painting "Boyarynya Morozova", it probably belongs to the most remarkable paintings of the Russian school".

The artist and critic Sergey Goloushev (literary pseudonym — Sergey Glagol) wrote in his memoirs, published in 1917, that he considered this painting as "the culmination of Surikov's work as a painter". Noting the relative simplicity of the canvas in comparison with the artist's previous major work —Boyaryna Morozova— Goloushev (Glagol) wrote that in Taking a Snow Town "and in the general coloring, in the colors and in the silhouette of the figures on a snowy background, even more originally Russian, surprisingly close to us and so familiar to the eye".

In the book Siberia in the Work of V.I. Surikov, published in 1930, the writer Sergey Durylin noted that the painting Taking a Snow City is interesting not only for its pictorial merits, but also because it "convincingly shows what Siberia meant for the work and personality of Surikov". Durylin called this canvas "the only cheerful" painting of the artist, which quite surprised his contemporaries, "who were accustomed to see in Surikov a gloomy, picturesque Dostoevsky, immersed in Russian history. Drawing attention to the fact that critics refer the work to genre paintings, Durylin wrote that "in its composition, in its colors, in the 'antiquity,' in the air, 'Gorodok' (a small town) — no less a history painting than other historical paintings by Surikov".

Art historians Dmitry Sarabianov and Vladimir Kemenov agreed with Durylin that "the spirit of history" can be felt in the painting Taking a Snow City. In their opinion, this work is a prologue to Surikov's later monumental historical paintings, such as Yermak's Conquest of Siberia (1895) and Suvorov's Crossing of the Alps (1899). Kemenov described this painting as a "joyful and cheerful picture, in which the artist managed to convey the sincere enthusiasm of the Siberians for the game". In his opinion, "the image of the glittering snowy landscape in the painting is inseparable from the image of the people, full of health and beauty; in it boil huge reserves of bogatyrsky forces, cheerfulness, fun".

== Bibliography ==
- Баева, В. (2010). Василий Иванович Суриков. Великие художники, том 26 (in Russian) (Директ-Медиа и Комсомольская правда ed.). М. p. 48. ISBN 978-5-87107-199-1.
- Безызвестных, Е. Ю. (1995). Суриков и Сибирь. Великие художники, том 26 (in Russian) (Директ-Медиа и Комсомольская правда ed.). Красноярск: Издательство Красноярского отделения ассоциации «Русская энциклопедия». p. 127.
- Безызвестных, Е. Ю. (2018). Картина Василия Сурикова «Взятие снежного городка» как явление переходного периода в творчестве художника (in Russian). Искусство Евразии. pp. 39–44. Archived from the original on 2020-08-11.
- Бенуа, А. Н. (2006). Художественные письма. 1908—1917. Газета «Речь». Классики искусствознания (in Russian). Vol. 1 (1908—1910). Петербург. — СПб.: Сад искусств. p. 608.
- Васильева-Шляпина, Г. Л. (2002). Сибирские красавицы В. Сурикова (in Russian). СПб.: Иван Фёдоров. p. 352.
- Волошин, М. А. (1985). Суриков (in Russian). Л.: Художник РСФСР. p. 224.
- Гомберг-Вержбинская, Э. П. (1970). Передвижники (in Russian). Л.: Искусство. p. 236.
- Гор Г. С., Петров В. Н. (1995). Суриков. Жизнь замечательных людей (in Russian). М.: Молодая гвардия. p. 224.
- Дружинин, С. Н. (1987). О русской и советской живописи (in Russian) (Художник РСФСР ed.). Л.: Молодая гвардия. p. 232.
- Дурылин, С. Н. (1930). Сибирь в творчестве В. И. Сурикова (in Russian). М.: Художественное издательское акционерное общество АХР. p. 62.
- Кеменов, В. С. (1983). Взятие снежного городка. К 135-летию со дня рождения В. И. Сурикова (in Russian) (Художник ed.). pp. 38–46.
- Кеменов, В. С. (1991). Василий Иванович Суриков. Русские живописцы XIX века (in Russian) (Художник РСФСР ed.). Л. p. 40.
- Кожевникова, Т. (2000). Василий Суриков. Мастера живописи (in Russian) (Белый город ed.). М. p. 48. ISBN 978-5-7793-0222-7.
- Машковцев, Н. Г. (1971). Василий Иванович Суриков (in Russian). Vol. 2 (Искусство ed.). М.: Русское искусство: очерки о жизни и творчестве художников. Вторая половина XIX века / А. И. Леонов. pp. 103–142.
- Москалюк М. В., Кистова А. В., Пименова Н. Н., Сезёва Н. И. (2016). Картина с сильным характером. К 125-летию картины В. И. Сурикова «Взятие снежного городка» (in Russian) (Поликор ed.). М.: Поликор. p. 80. ISBN 978-5-91502-105-0.
- Никольский, В. А. (1923). В. И. Суриков. Образы человечества (in Russian) (Брокгауз — Ефрон ed.). Пг. p. 118.
- Никольский, В. А. (1934). Творческие процессы В. И. Сурикова (in Russian) (Всекохудожник ed.). Пг. p. 124.
- Перепёлкина, Г. П. (1966). В. И. Суриков (in Russian). М.: Искусство. p. 136.
- Петинова, Е. Ф. (2001). Русские художники XVIII — начала XX века (in Russian). СПб.: Аврора. p. 345. ISBN 978-5-7300-0714-7.
- Рогинская, Ф. С. (1989). Товарищество передвижных художественных выставок (in Russian). М.: Искусство. p. 430.
- Сарабьянов, Д. В. (1995). Народно-освободительные идеи русской живописи второй половины XIX века (in Russian). М.: Искусство. p. 300.
- Стасов, В. В. (1954). Статьи и заметки, публиковавшиеся в газетах и не вошедшие в книжные издания (in Russian). Vol. 2. М.: Издательство Академии художеств СССР. p. 300.
- Титова В. Г., Титов Г. А. (1956). В. И. Суриков (in Russian). Красноярск: Красноярское книжное издательство. p. 208.
- Василий Иванович Суриков. 1848—1916. Каталог выставки / А. С. Галушкина, А. М. Лесюк, Е. А. Котова, Н. М. Щёкотов. — М.—Л.: Искусство, 1937. — 95 p.
- Суриков Василий Иванович; Издатель: Искусство (1977). Василий Иванович Суриков. Письма. Воспоминания о художнике (1977) (in Russian).
- Государственная Третьяковская галерея — каталог собрания / Я. В. Брук, Л. И. Иовлева. — М.: Красная площадь, 2006. — V. 4: Живопись второй половины XIX века, book 2, Н—Я. — 560 p. — ISBN 5-900743-22-5.
- Государственный Русский музей — Живопись, XVIII — начало XX века (каталог). — Л.: Аврора и Искусство, 1980. — 448 p.
- Государственный Русский музей — каталог собрания / В. А. Леняшин. — СПб.: Palace Editions, 2017. — V. 7: Живопись второй половины XIX века (Н—Я). — 248 p. — ISBN 978-3-906917-17-7.
- Государственный Русский музей. Живопись XII — начала XX века / В. А. Пушкарёв. — М.: Изобразительное искусство, 1993. — 216 p. — (Музеи мира). — ISBN 5-85200-133-3.
- Государственный Русский музей — Из истории музея / И. Н. Карасик, Е. Н. Петрова. — СПб.: ГРМ, 1995. — 312 p. — ISBN 5-900872-04-1.
- Товарищество передвижных художественных выставок. Письма, документы. 1869—1899 / В. В. Андреева, М. В. Астафьева, С. Н. Гольдштейн, Н. Л. Приймак. — М.: Искусство, 1987. — 668 p.
- Художники народов СССР. Библиографический словарь / Т. Н. Горина. — М.: Искусство, 1972. — V. 2 (Бойченко — Геонджиан).
- 100 лет Русского музея в фотографиях. 1898—1998 / Г. А. Поликарпова. — СПб.: Palace Editions, 1998. — 120 p. — ISBN 5-900872-72-6.
- Catalogue officiel illustré de l'exposition décennale des beaux-arts de 1889 à 1900. — Paris: Lemercier, Baschet, 1900. — 336 p.
