= Irkutsk State Medical University =

Public medical school in Irkutsk, Russia

- Иркутский государственный медицинский университет
- Type: Public
- Established: 27 October 1919
- Location: Irkutsk, Russia; 52°16′25″N 104°16′54″E
- Campus: Urban
- Nickname: IGMU (Russian: ИГМУ)
- Website: www.irkgmu.ru

Irkutsk State Medical University (Russian: Иркутский государственный медицинский университет) is a higher education institution in Irkutsk, Irkutsk Oblast, Russia.

== History ==
On August 26, 1919, the Medical Department was opened at the Physics and Mathematics Faculty of Irkutsk (East Siberian) University. On January 20, 1920, the Medical Department became an independent educational and administrative entity—the Faculty of Medicine of Irkutsk University. Due to a number of circumstances, the university's anniversary date has traditionally been set at October 27, 1919.

The organizers were old Russian intellectuals, essentially the elite of the Kazan Medical School, among them Nikolai Bushmakin.

In 1929, a radical restructuring of higher education began in the Soviet Union. Universities from the People's Commissariat of Education system were transferred to sectoral People's Commissariats. By this time, the Faculty of Medicine also faced the internal need to transform itself into an independent entity. For this reason, in the spring of 1930, the Faculty of Medicine at Irkutsk University was separated into an independent institute and placed under the jurisdiction of the People's Commissariat of Health.

In 1992, the Irkutsk State Medical Institute passed state certification for the assessment of the quality of specialist training, conducted by the State Inspectorate for Certification of Educational Institutions of the State Committee for Higher Education, hence in May 1995 it received a medical university status.
