= Kerensky Uyezd =

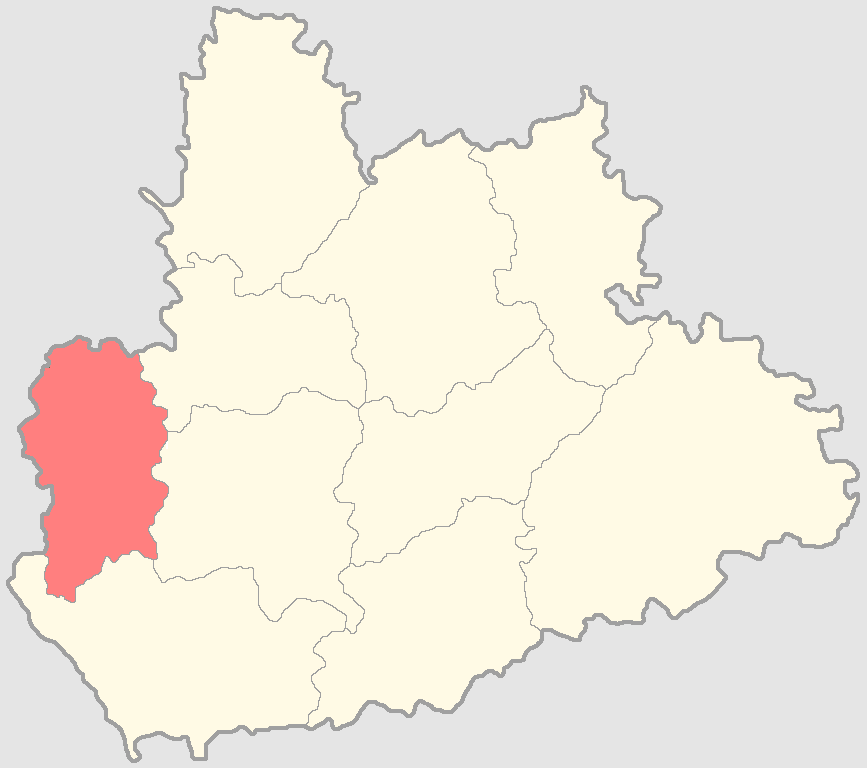
Kerensky Uyezd, one of the subdivisions of the Penza Governorate

Kerensky Uyezd (Керенский уезд) was one of the subdivisions of the Penza Governorate of the Russian Empire. It was situated in the western part of the governorate. Its administrative centre was Kerensk (Vadinsk). In terms of present-day administrative borders, the territory of Kerensky Uyezd is divided between the Bashmakovsky, Pachelmsky, Spassky, Vadinsky and Zemetchinsky districts of Penza Oblast.

== Demographics ==
At the time of the Russian Empire Census of 1897, Kerensky Uyezd had a population of 106,091. Of these, 95.2% spoke Russian, 4.6% Tatar and 0.1% Mordvin as their native language.
