= Georg Myasnikov =

Soviet historian (1926-1996)

Georg Vasilyevich Myasnikov (Russian: Георг Васильевич Мясников; 20 March 1926, Kopovka – 18 July 1996, Moscow) was a Soviet state and public figure, historian and local history specialist.

He was second secretary of the Penza Oblast committee of CPSU (1961–1964, 1965–1986), secretary of the Penza Oblast committee of CPSU (1964–1965), first deputy chairman of the Soviet culture fund board (1986–1991), and deputy chairman of Russian culture fund (1991–1992).

He made major contributions to the creation of new cultural objects (museums, monuments etc.), sport institutions, youth clubs and recreation areas, which improved the Penza region's reputation and popularity.

In his work for the culture fund, Myasnikov furthered the foundation of new museums, charitable funds, and a publishing branch. He took steps for development of international cultural relationships and returning of cultural values to USSR.

He was the author of several articles, two books on Penza Oblast and a diary which were partially published after his death. A plaque was placed in his honour on a secondary school in Penza after his death.

== Awards ==
He was awarded:

- Order of the October Revolution
- Two Orders of the Red Banner of Labour
- Order of Friendship of Peoples
- Order of the Badge of Honour
- Jubilee Medal "In Commemoration of the 100th Anniversary of the Birth of Vladimir Ilyich Lenin"
- Medal "For the Defence of Moscow"
- Medal "For Valiant Labour in the Great Patriotic War 1941–1945"
- Jubilee Medal "Thirty Years of Victory in the Great Patriotic War 1941–1945"
- Jubilee Medal "Forty Years of Victory in the Great Patriotic War 1941–1945"
- Medal "Veteran of Labour"
- Medal "In Commemoration of the 800th Anniversary of Moscow"
