= Vadinsk =

Rural locality in Penza Oblast, Russia

Coordinates: 53°41′37″N 43°03′10″E

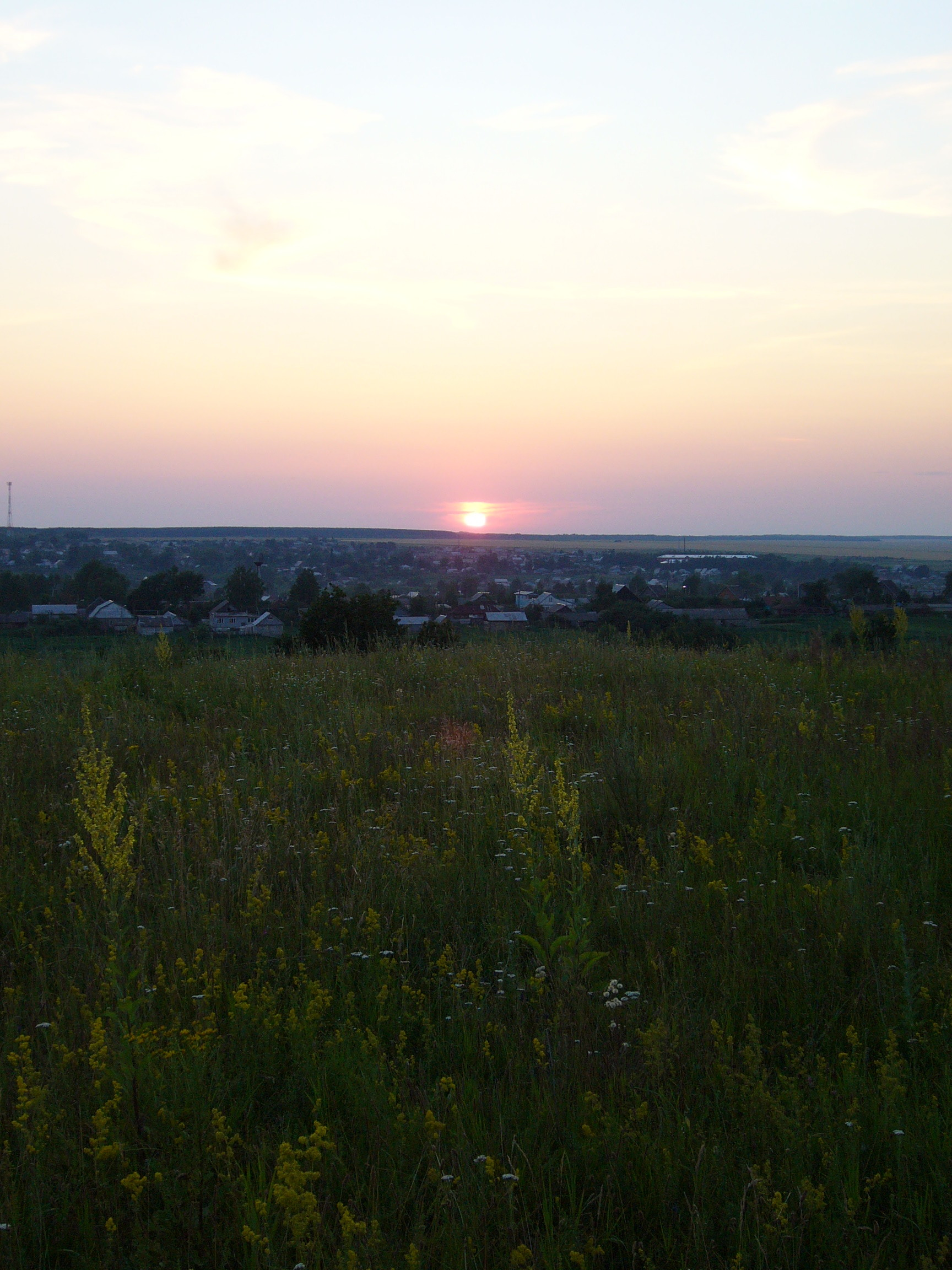
Vadinsk

Coat of arms of Vadinsk

Vadinsk (Russian: Ва́динск) is a rural locality (a selo) and the administrative center of Vadinsky District, Penza Oblast, Russia. Population: 4,891 (2010 census); 4,771 (2002 census); 5,218 (1989 Soviet census).
