= Medal "In Commemoration of the 800th Anniversary of Moscow" =

Commemorative medal of the Soviet Union

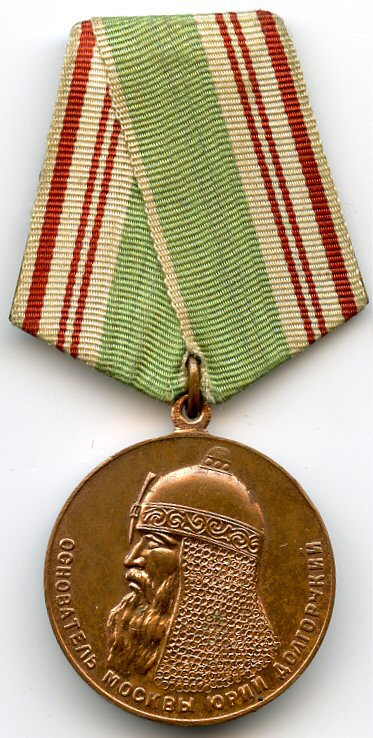
- Medal "In Commemoration of the 800th Anniversary of Moscow" (obverse)
- Type: Commemorative medal
- Awarded for: Wartime and peacetime service to the city of Moscow
- Presented by: Soviet Union
- Eligibility: Citizens of the Soviet Union
- Status: No longer awarded
- Established: September 20, 1947

Highlights
- Total: 1,733,400
- Ribbon of the Medal "In Commemoration of the 800th Anniversary of Moscow"

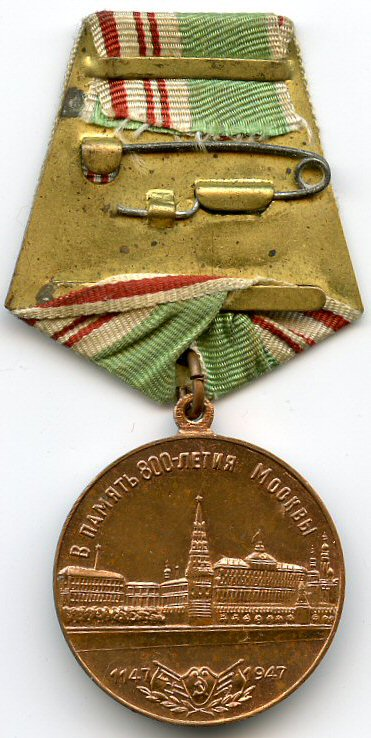
Reverse of the Medal "In Commemoration of the 800th Anniversary of Moscow"

Actor and People's Artist of the USSR Yevgeny Samoilov, a recipient of the Medal "In Commemoration of the 800th Anniversary of Moscow"

The Medal "In Commemoration of the 800th Anniversary of Moscow" (Russian: Медаль «В память 800-летия Москвы») was a state commemorative medal of the Soviet Union established by decree of the Presidium of the Supreme Soviet of the USSR on September 20, 1947 and bestowed to prominent Soviet citizens and veterans in commemoration of the 800th anniversary of the first Russian reference to Moscow, dating to 1147 when Yuri Dolgorukiy called upon the prince of the Novgorod-Severski to "come to me, brother, to Moscow". Its statute was amended by decree of the Presidium of the Supreme Soviet of the USSR on July 17, 1980.

== Medal statute ==
The Medal "In Commemoration of the 800th Anniversary of Moscow" was awarded to: workers, technicians and employees of industrial enterprises, transportation and urban development of Moscow; to people working in science, technology, art, literature, education and health; to employees of state institutions, party, trade unions, Komsomol and other public organizations; who distinguished themselves in working in the reconstruction of the capital and ensured the development of its own labour in industry, transportation, urban development, and in academic and cultural institutions; to soldiers, to war or labour related invalids; to housewives who take an active part in the improvement of the city and in the work of schools and childcare facilities. The award was conditional to having resided in the city of Moscow or its suburbs for a minimum of 5 years.

The Medal "In Commemoration of the 800th Anniversary of Moscow" was awarded on behalf of the Presidium of the Supreme Soviet of the USSR by the Executive Committee of the City of Moscow and the People's Deputies of the Regional Executive Committees based on documents issued by the heads of enterprises, the Party or government organizations. Each medal came with an attestation of award, this attestation came in the form of a small 8 cm by 11 cm cardboard booklet bearing the award's name, the recipient's particulars and an official stamp and signature on the inside.

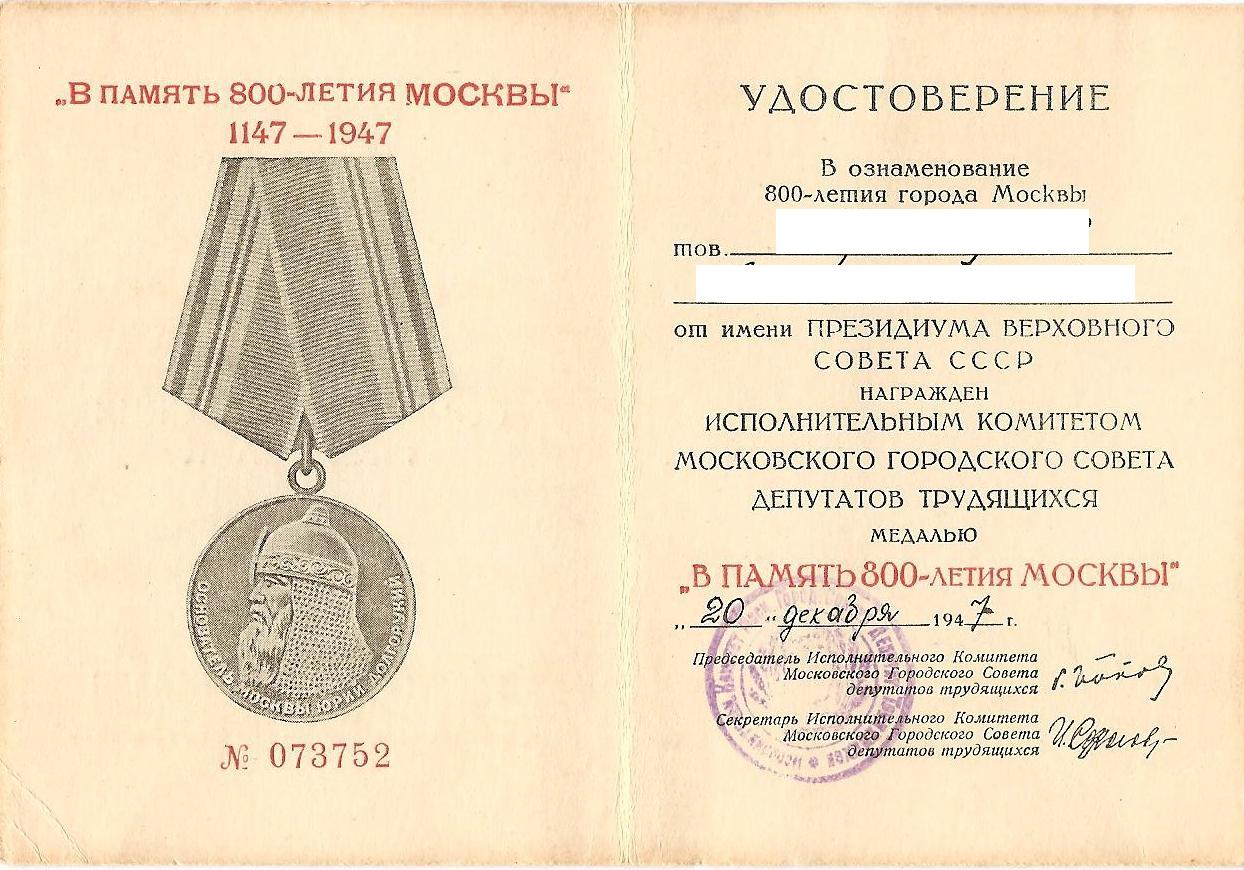
Award attestation document for the Medal "In Commemoration of the 800th Anniversary of Moscow" (inside pages)

It was worn on the left side of the chest and in precedence of other medals or Orders of the USSR, placed immediately after the Jubilee Medal "50 Years of the Soviet Militia". If worn in the presence of medals and Orders of the Russian Federation, the latter have precedence.

== Medal description ==
The Medal "In Commemoration of the 800th Anniversary of Moscow" was a 37 mm in diameter circular copper medal designed by SL Tulchinsky and I I Dubasov. The rim was convex and all the inscriptions and images were in relief. The obverse bore the helmeted left profile of Yuri Dolgorukiy. In the lower half, along the medal circumference, the inscription "The founder of Moscow Yuri Dolgorukiy" (Russian: «Основатель Москвы Юрий Долгорукий»). The reverse bore an image of the Kremlin in the center, at the bottom, the hammer and sickle with flags and arms over two laurel branches, to the left the year "1147", to the right, the year "1947". At the top along the medal circumference, the inscription "In commemoration of the 800th anniversary of Moscow" (Russian: «В память 800-летия Москвы»).

The medal was secured to a standard Russian pentagonal mount by a ring through the medal suspension loop. The mount was covered by a 24 mm wide silk moiré ribbon of green, white and red. The ribbon's coloured stripes were separated as such: white 1 mm, green 11 mm, white 3 mm, red 1 mm, white 1 mm, red 1 mm, white 3 mm, red 2 mm, white 1 mm.

== Recipients (partial list) ==
The individuals below were recipients of the Medal "In Commemoration of the 800th Anniversary of Moscow".

- Defense Minister and Marshal of the Soviet Union Kliment Yefremovich Voroshilov
- Defense Minister and Marshal of the Soviet Union Georgy Konstantinovich Zhukov
- Rocket engineer and spacecraft designer colonel Sergei Pavlovich Korolev
- Cellist and conductor Mstislav Leopoldovich Rostropovich
- Physicist and Nobel laureate Alexander Mikhaylovich Prokhorov
- Composer Aram Ilyich Khachaturian
- Marshal of the Soviet Union Semyon Konstantinovich Timoshenko
- Theoretical physicist, astrophysicist, Nobel laureate Vitaly Lazarevich Ginzburg
- Composer, pianist, leader of the Union of Soviet Composers Tikhon Nikolayevich Khrennikov
- Marshal of the Soviet Union Vasily Danilovich Sokolovsky
- Scientist, designer of the rocket launch complexes Vladimir Pavlovich Barmin
- Engineer Sergey Aleksandrovich Afanasyev
- Admiral of the Fleet of the Soviet Union Ivan Stepani Isakov
- Marshal of Artillery Vasily Ivanovich Kazakov
- Marshal of the Soviet Union Aleksandr Mikhaylovich Vasilevsky
- Major General Vladimir Sergeyevich Ilyushin
- Marshal of the Soviet Union Ivan Stepanovich Konev
- Marshal of the Soviet Union Leonid Aleksandrovich Govorov
- Marshal of the Soviet Union Fyodor Ivanovich Tolbukhin
- Historian Georg Vasilievich Myasnikov
- Marshal of the Soviet Union Sergey Fyodorovich Akhromeyev
- Football player and manager Konstantin Ivanovich Beskov
- Colonel General Leonid Mikhaylovich Sandalov
- Actor and People's Artist of the USSR Yevgeny Valerianovich Samoilov
- Crystallographer, geochemist and academician Nikolay Vasilyevich Belov
- Rocket designer Boris Evseyevich Chertok
- Stage and a film actor Yevgeny Yakovlevich Vesnik
- Lieutenant General Vitaly Ivanovich Popkov

== See also ==
- Medal "In Commemoration of the 850th Anniversary of Moscow"
- Orders, decorations, and medals of the Soviet Union
- Battle of Moscow
- City of Moscow
