= Vadinsky District =

Vadinsky District Вадинский район (Russian)
- District
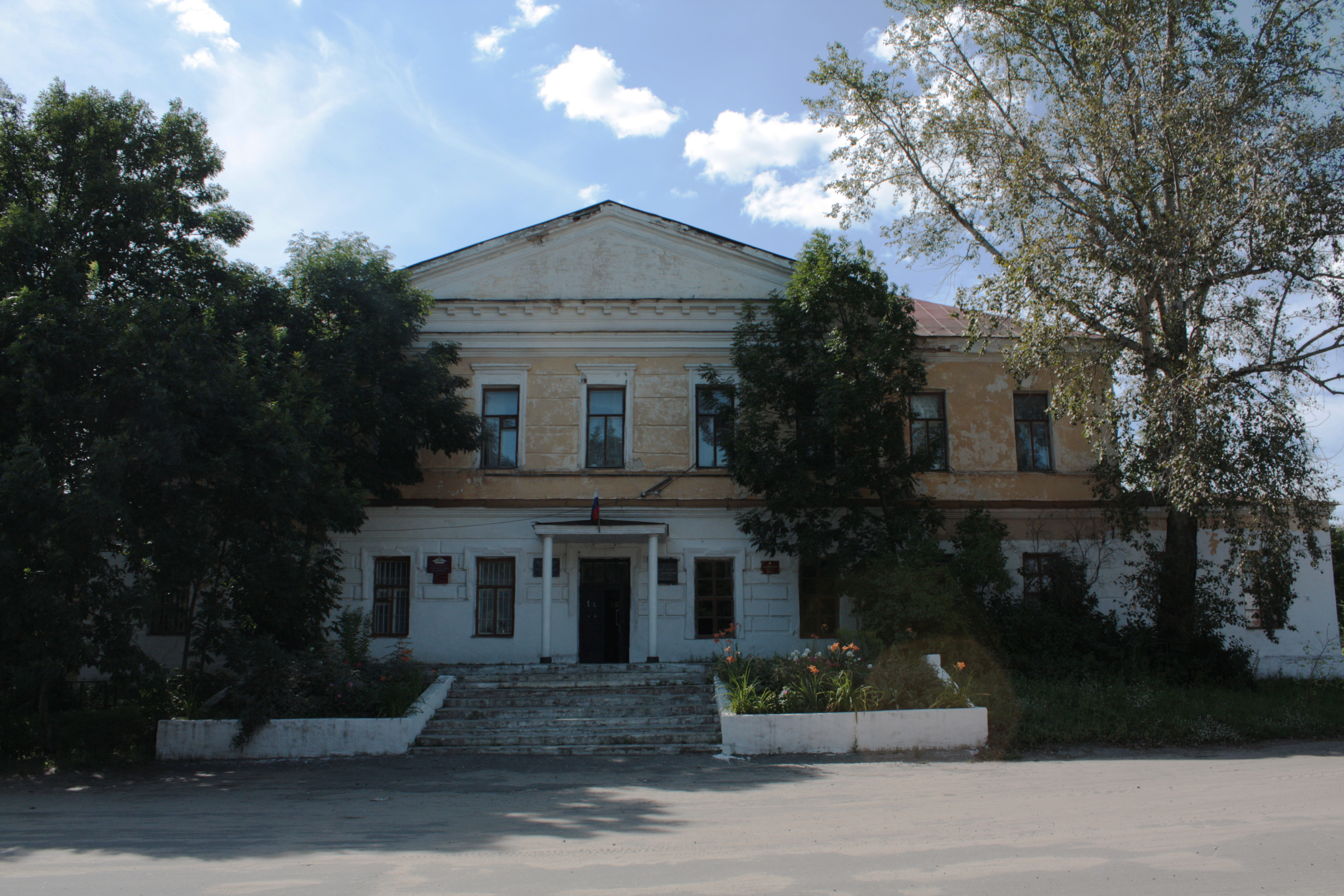
- Town hall in Kerensk, Vadinsky District

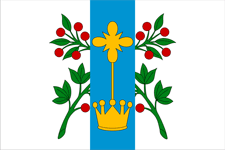
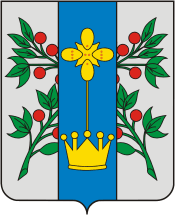
- Flag Coat of arms
- Location of Vadinsky District in Penza Oblast
- Coordinates: 53°41′30″N 43°03′00″E
- Country: Russia
- Federal subject: Penza Oblast
- Established: 16 July 1928
- Administrative center: Vadinsk

Area
  - Total: 1,040 km^{2} (400 sq mi)

Population (2010 Census)
  - Total: 9,807
  - Density: 9.43/km^{2} (24.4/sq mi)
  - Urban: 0%
  - Rural: 100%

Administrative structure
  - Administrative divisions: 7 selsoviet
  - Inhabited localities: 56 rural localities

Municipal structure
  - Municipally incorporated as: Vadinsky Municipal District
  - Municipal divisions: 0 urban settlements, 7 rural settlements
- Time zone: UTC+3 (MSK)
- OKTMO ID: 56615000
- Website: http://rvadinsk.pnzreg.ru/

Vadinsky District (Russian: Ва́динский райо́н) is an administrative and municipal district (raion), one of the twenty-seven in Penza Oblast, Russia. It is located in the northwest of the oblast. The area of the district is 1,040 square kilometers (400 sq mi). Its administrative center is the rural locality (a selo) of Vadinsk. Population: 9,807 (2010 Census); 11,218 (2002 census); 14,137 (1989 Soviet census). The population of Vadinsk accounts for 49.9% of the district's total population.

== Notable residents ==
- Ivan Mokrousov (1919–1972), Red Army soldier during World War II, Hero of the Soviet Union, born in the village of Rakhmanivka
- Georg Myasnikov (1926–1996), politician and historian
