= Sukhobuzimsky =

Sukhobuzimsky (masculine), Sukhobuzimskaya (feminine), or Sukhobuzimskoye (neuter) may refer to:

- Sukhobuzimsky District, a district in Krasnoyarsk Krai, Russia
- Sukhobuzimskoye, a rural locality (selo) in Krasnoyarsk Krai, Russia
