= Feodosia Morozova =

Russian Old Believer martyr (1632–1675)

- Феодосия Морозова
- Born: Feodosia Prokopiyevna Sokovnina; 21 May 1632
- Died: 1 December 1675 (age 44); Borovsk, Russia
- Known for: Old Believers martyr

Feodosia Prokopiyevna Morozova (Russian: Феодосия Прокопьевна Морозова; née Sokovnina (Соковнина); 21 May 1632 – 1 December 1675) was a Russian noblewoman and one of the best-known partisans of the Old Believer movement. (Note: Daniil Ermokhin (October 22, 2018). "Boyarinya Morozova". www.rpsc.ru. Moscow: The Russian Orthodox Old Believer Church. The official website of the Moscow Metropolitanate. (on Russian))

She was perceived as a martyr after she was arrested and died in prison. She was praised in pamphlets shortly after her death, hailed as a rebel by revolutionaries in the 19th century, and is to this day hailed as a holy martyr by the Old Believers.

== Life ==
She was born on 21 May 1632 into a family of the okolnichy Prokopy Feodorovich Sokovnin. At the age of 17, she was married to the boyar Gleb Morozov, brother to the tsar's tutor Boris Morozov, one of the wealthiest men in Russia and brother-in-law of Tsar Alexis. Morozova bore one child to Gleb, a son, Ivan. After her husband's early death in 1662, she retained a prominent position at the Russian court as a lady-in-waiting to Tsarina Maria. She also inherited vast wealth, which she administered on behalf of her son Ivan.

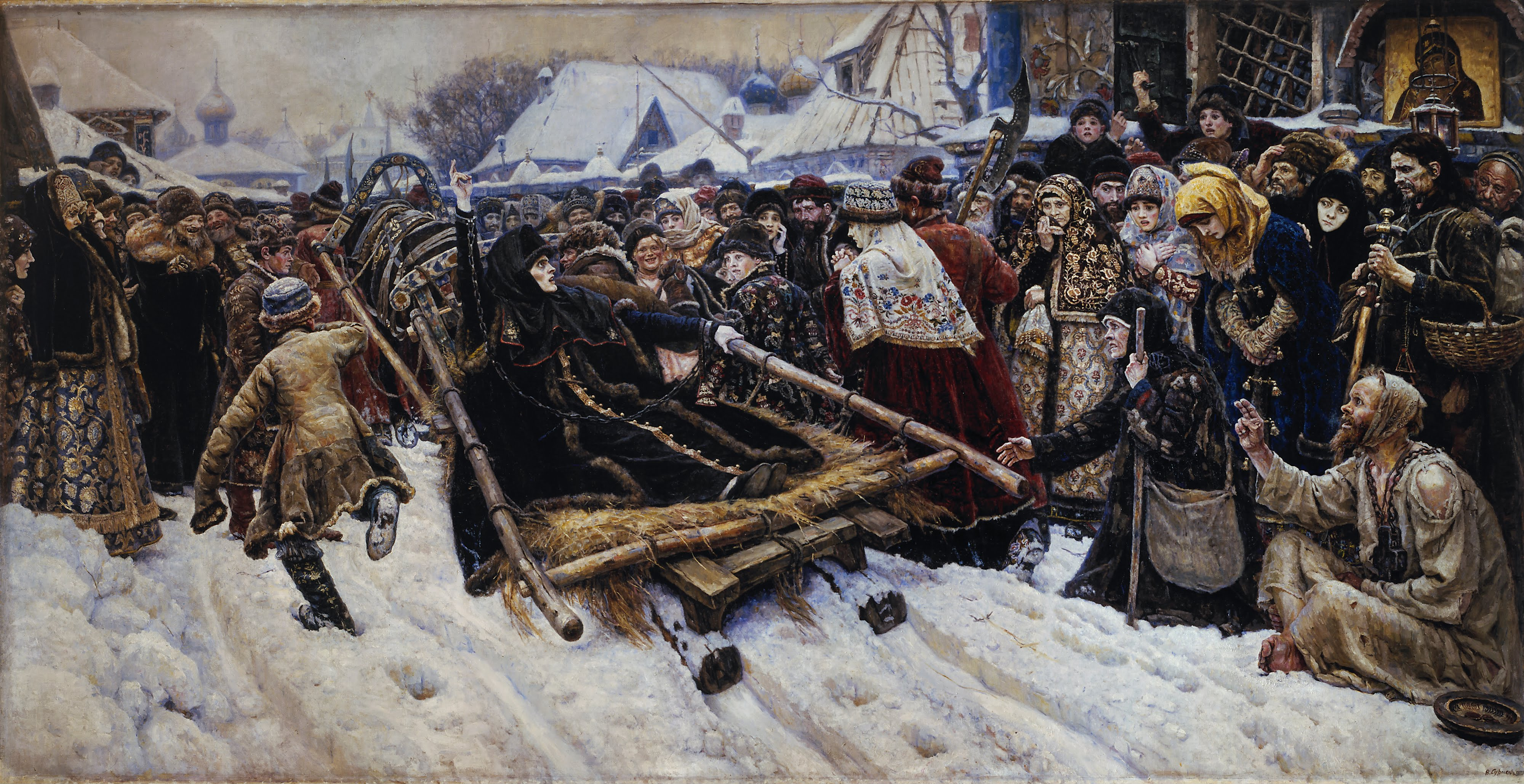
Boyaryna Morozova by Vasily Surikov is depicting Morozova's arrest by the Nikonites in 1671. As an Old Believer, she holds two fingers, rather than three, raised in the old way of making the sign of the cross.

During the Raskol, because Archpriest Avvakum was her confessor, Morozova joined the Old Believers' movement and secretly took monastic vows with the name Theodora. She played an important role in convincing her sister, Princess Evdokia Urusova, to join the Old Believers. They were also joined by fellow noblewoman Maria Danilova. Following Avvakum, she rejected the reforms of Patriarch Nikon insisting he had no authority in the church to alter established practices, identifying such innovations with the corruption of the faith by the antichrist.

After many misfortunes, the two sisters and Danilova were arrested by order of Tsar Alexis in 1671. They were interrogated and tortured over a long period, but refused to recant. Attempts to reach a compromise led by Patriarch Pitirim were also rejected. While she was under arrest, her son Ivan died.

Alexis contemplated having Morozova burned at the stake, but was dissuaded. Instead, she and the others were incarcerated in an underground cellar of the St. Paphnutius Monastery at Borovsk, where they endured considerable deprivations. After the appointment of a new Patriarch, Ioakim in 1674, they were deprived of all support and slowly starved. All three succumbed to starvation, in 1675, with Morozova dying on November 2.

== Reputation ==
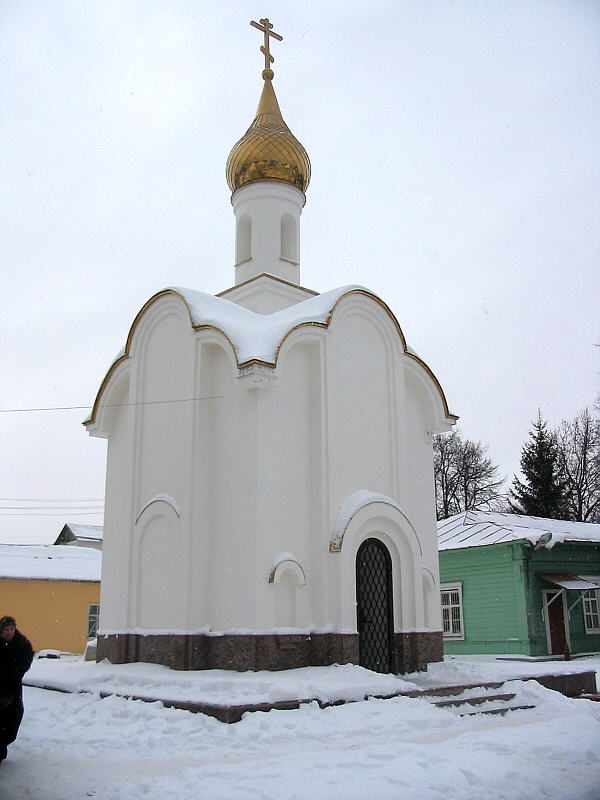
A chapel constructed on the supposed site of Morozova's death

Avvakum wrote a "Lament for the three martyrs". A hagiography, Tale of Boiarynia Morozov, (Note: Mazunin A (1979). The Tale of Boyar Morozova [Повесть о боярыне Морозовой] (in Russian). Leningrad: Science [Наука]. p. 226. ISBN 978-5-235-03559-1. The Tale) by an unknown author, gave an account of her life as a martyr. The story circulated widely and miracles were attributed to Morozova by Old Believers. Many Old Believer communities continue to venerate her as a martyr.

Nevertheless, her reputation was limited until Morozova's role as a representative of Russian identity and tradition became important to nationalist writers in the 19th century. She became a household name after being discussed by important Russian writers and depicted by Vasily Surikov. She was also taken as a heroine by some radical groups, who saw her as a symbol of resistance to state power. The People's Will revolutionary movement promoted her, and her virtues were praised by writers of the Soviet era such as Anna Akhmatova, Varlam Shalamov and Fazil Iskander, who "symbolically enlisted her in their own causes of resistance".

A chapel was constructed in 2002 on the site of the prison where Morozova died.

== Sources ==
Publications available in English

Publications available only in Russian
