= Boyaryna Morozova (painting) =

Painting by Vasily Surikov

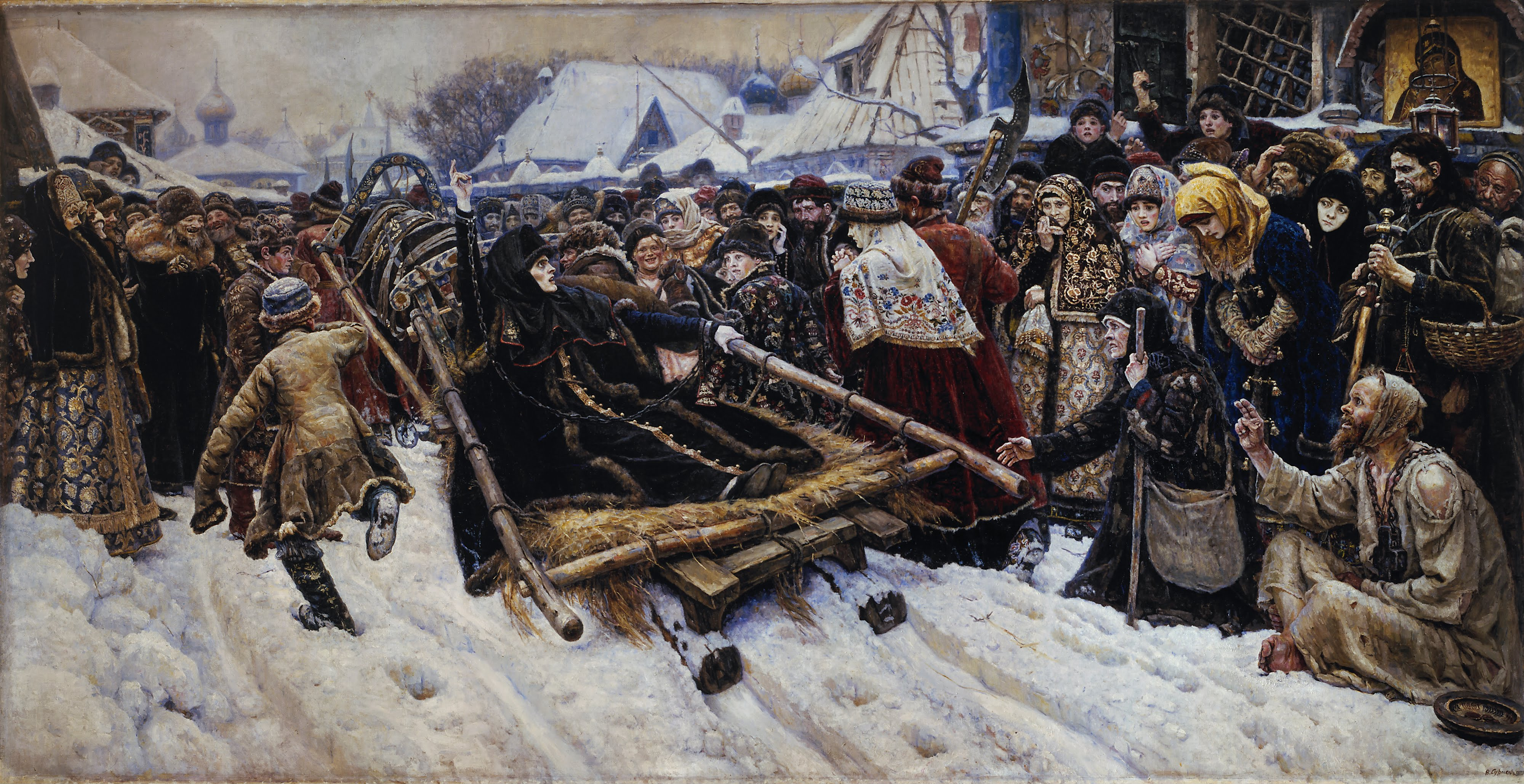
- Artist: Vasily Surikov
- Year: 1884-1887
- Medium: Oil on canvas
- Dimensions: 304 cm × 587,5 cm (120 in × 2,313 in)
- Location: Tretyakov Gallery, Moscow

Boyaryna Morozova is a painting by V. I. Surikov, measuring 304 by 587.5 cm, depicts a scene from the history of the church schism in the 17th century. After its debut at the 15th Travelling Exhibition in 1887, it was purchased for 25 thousand rubles for the Tretyakov Gallery, where it remains one of the main exhibits.

== Origins ==
Surikov's interest in the subject of Old Believers is associated with his Siberian childhood. In Siberia, where there were many Old Believers, manuscript "hagiographies" of martyrs of the Old Believer movement, including The Tale of Boyarina Morozova, were widely distributed. His godmother, Olga Matveevna Durandina, at whose home he lived in Krasnoyarsk during his studies at the district school, introduced the future artist to the so-called long version of this document.

According to its text, on November 17 or 18, 1671 A. D. (i. e., 7180 A. D. from the creation of the world), the famous schismatic sisters Feodosia Morozova and Evdokiya Urusova, who were kept "in human chambers in the cellar" of the Moscow chambers of the Morozovs, were sent to the Chudov Monastery. When the travois approached the monastery, the noblewoman, with a chain around her neck, folded her hand in a two-fingered sign of the cross and "exalted herself with a cross, often shielded herself with a cross, and often tinkled with it".

== Work on the painting ==
Surikov recalled that the key to the image of the protagonist was inspired by a crow with a black wing, which was once seen beating against the snow. The image of the Boyarina is drawn from an Old Believer whom the artist met at the Rogozhsky cemetery. The portrait sketch was painted in just two hours. Before that, the artist could not find a suitable face for a long time — bloodless, fanatical, corresponding to the famous description of Avvakum: "The fingers of your hands are delicate, your eyes are lightning-fast, and you throw yourself at enemies like a lion". The fool was drawn from a poor man in Moscow who traded cucumbers while sitting in the snow. In total, more than a hundred preparatory sketches for the painting, mostly portraits, have been preserved. The artist attached the sketches to the painting with buttons, which left holes that were discovered during restoration.

While working on the painting, the artist spent a long time observing the shades of snow, of which there are dozens on the canvas; it is no coincidence that his contemporaries called his work "color symphonies". "When making sketches, Surikov placed his models directly on the snow, observing the color reflexes on clothes and faces, studying how the cold winter air affects the color of the skin, causing particularly vivid colors on its surface".

There is a legend in the history of art that originally Surikov began to paint Boyaryna Morozova on a smaller canvas, but feeling that he could not fit all the conceived characters on it, he made an overstitching at the bottom, where he depicted the distance from the edge of the painting to the carts. Only after that did the carts visually "go," making it clear "how hard it is for these carts to get through, to get through the crowd". Restorers and museum staff do not confirm the legend about the overstitching of the canvas. According to another version, the static nature of the canvas disappeared and a sense of movement appeared after the artist decided to draw a running boy next to the carriage.

Sketches for the painting

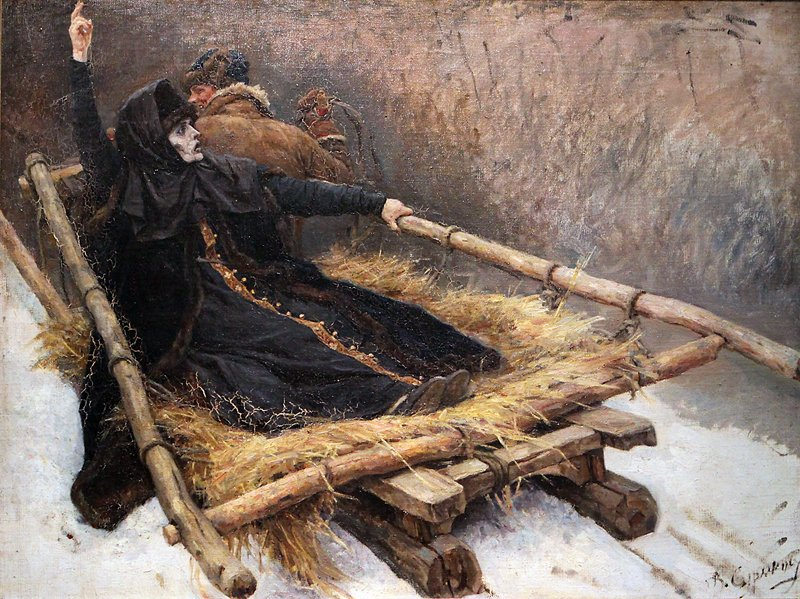

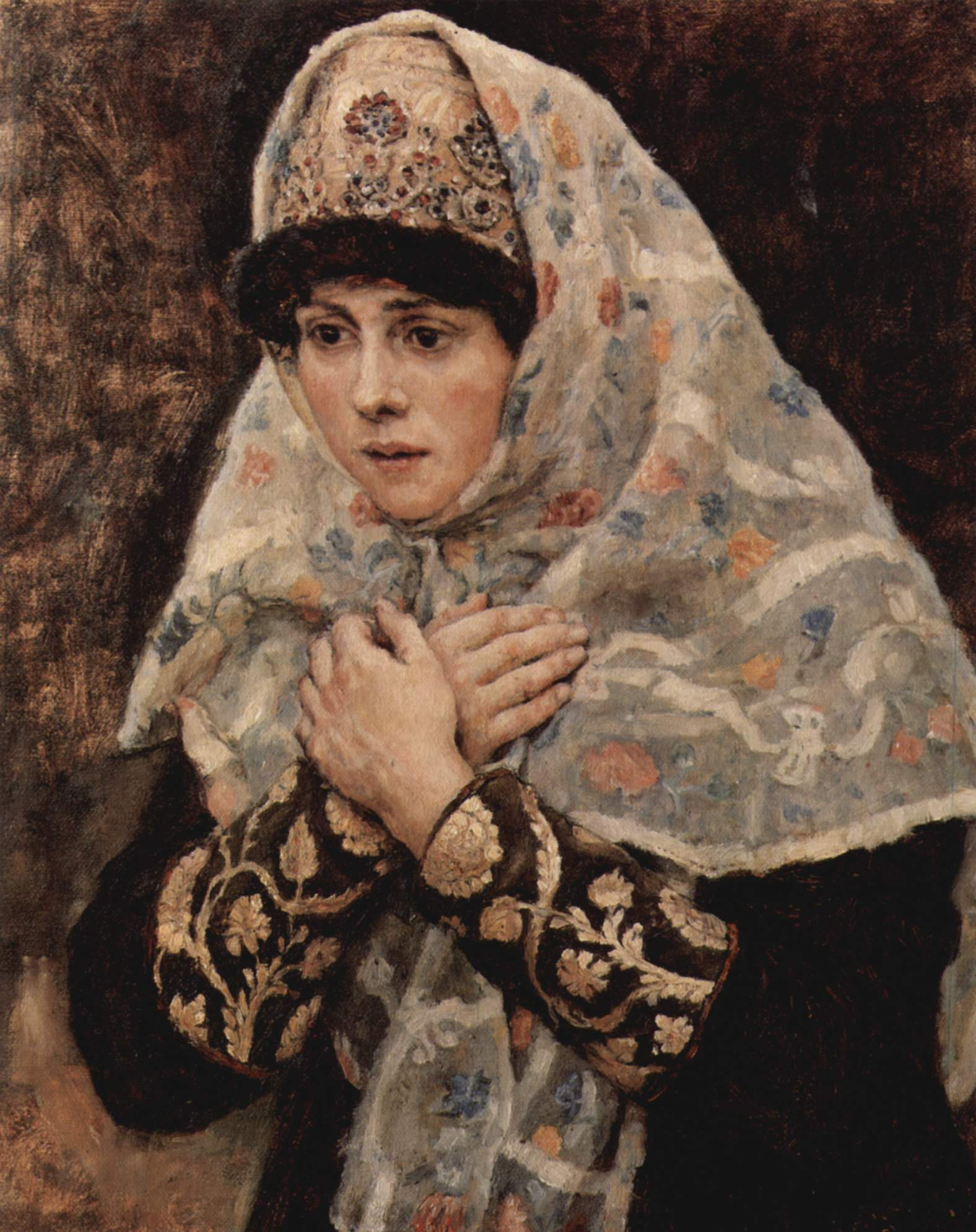

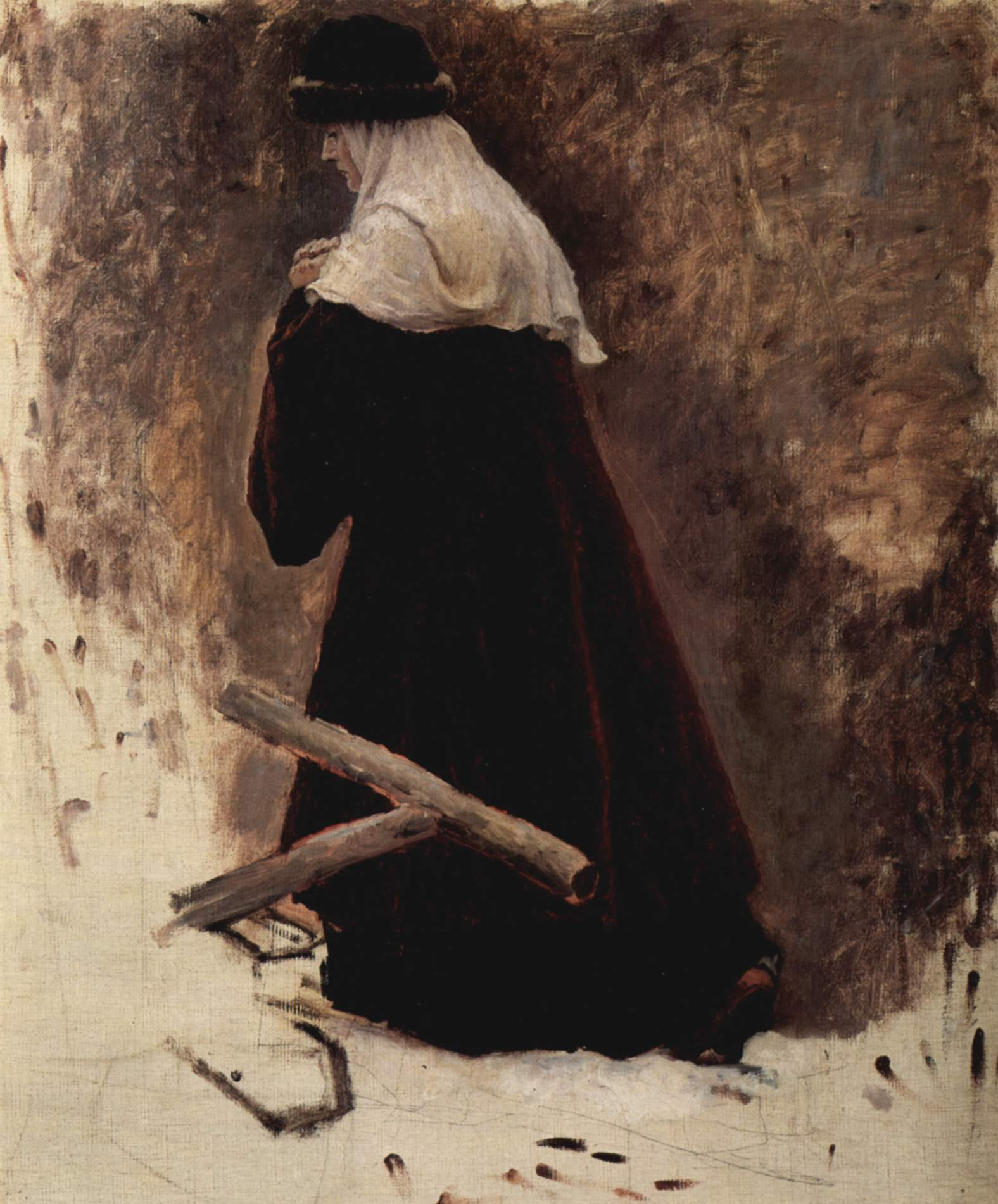

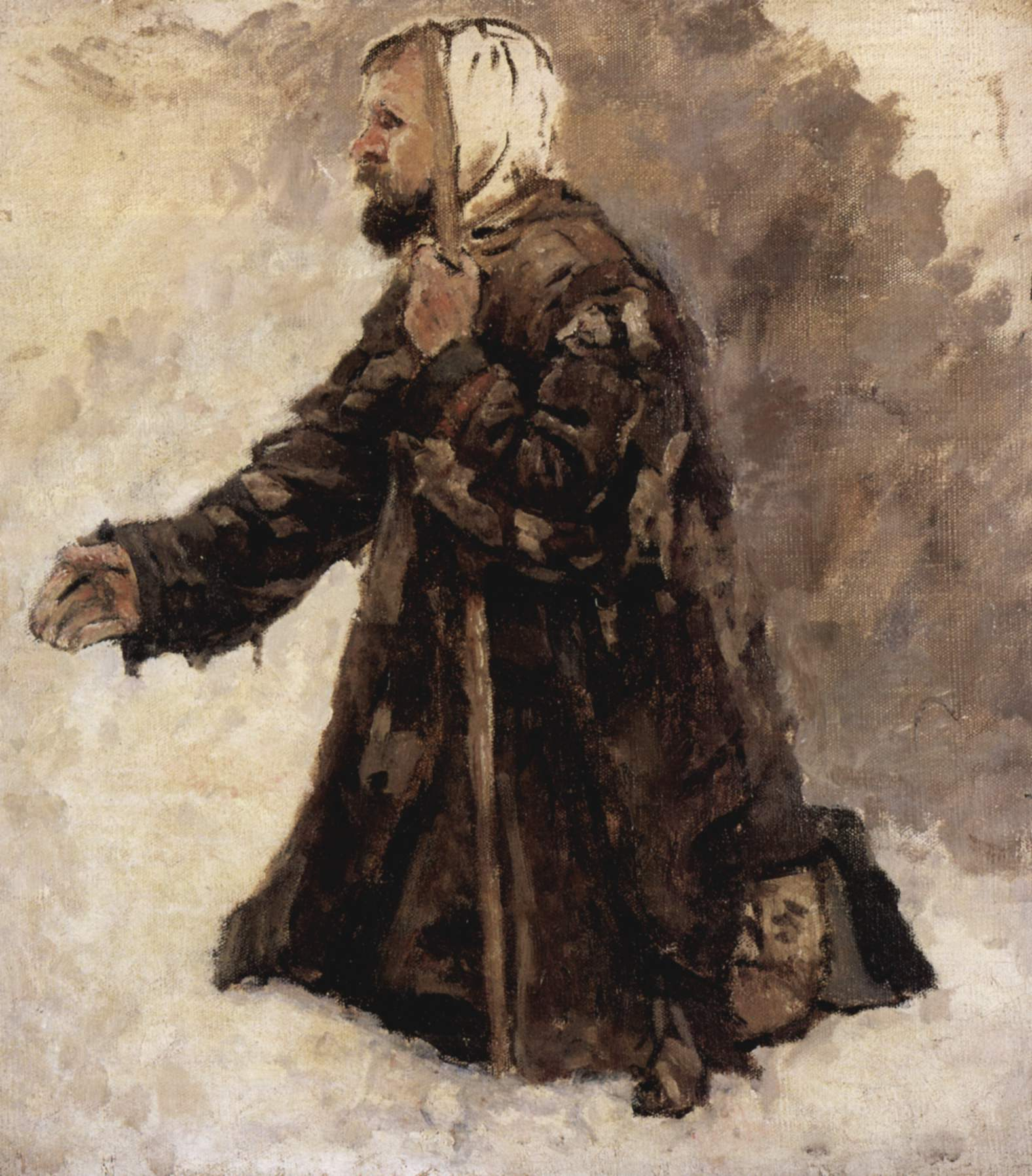

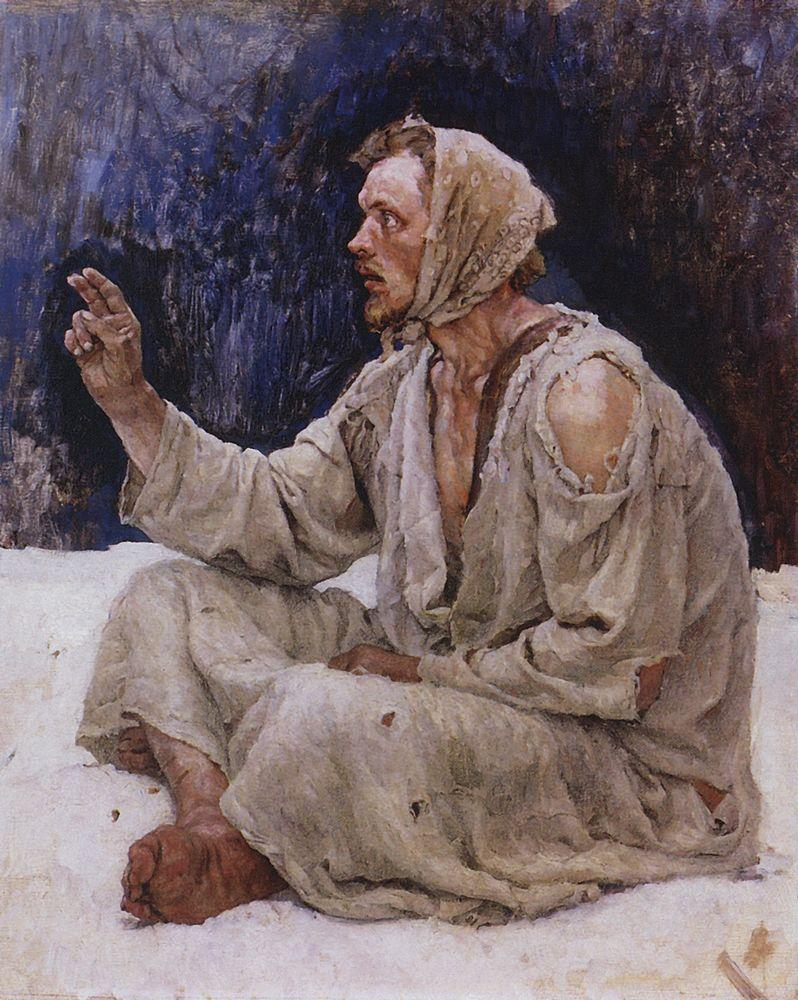

== Description ==
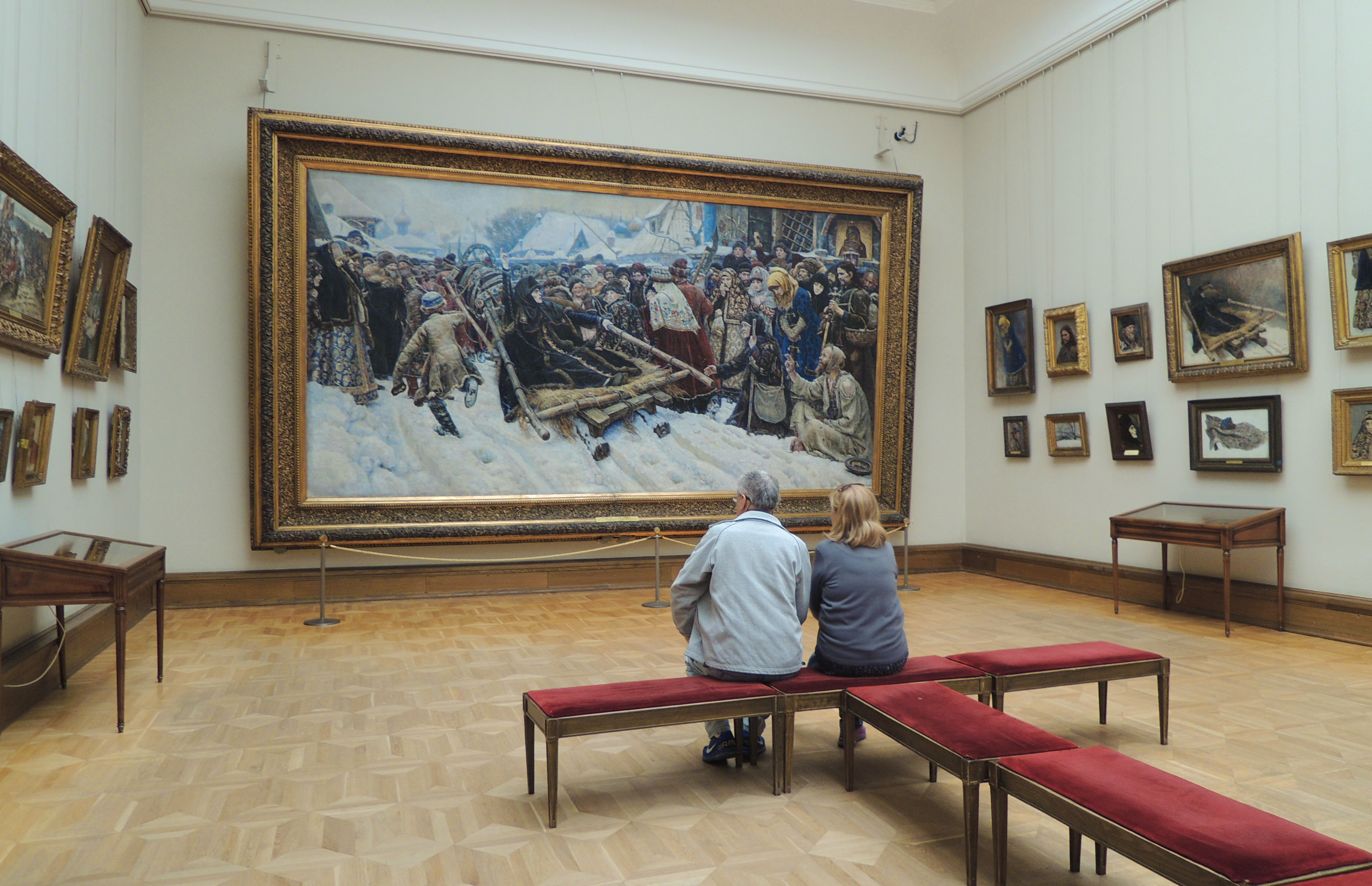
In the interior of the Tretyakov Gallery.

Boyaryna's figure on the sliding carriage serves as a single compositional center around which the street crowd is grouped, reacting differently to her fanatical willingness to follow her beliefs to the end. Some people find the woman's fanaticism hateful, mocking, or ironic, but the majority view her with sympathy. The hand raised high in a symbolic gesture represents a farewell to old Russia, to which these people belong. According to one interpretation, under the influence of the Boyaryna's example, "the mental transformation of these people is accomplished... the will is hardened in them... unknown mental forces rise up".

In the color of the Russian winter, the artist's eye first discovered an inexhaustible richness. Surikov imparts a unifying painterly quality to the whole picture. All its parts and details seem to be connected by a single breath of a frosty Moscow day. Clothes, rich and shabby, dark and light, serve here as a muffled bass accompaniment to the vibrant colors of faces and hands. These clothes form an overall dark mass, the complex tonality of which is defined by a few local patches of blue, red, and yellow.

== Critics ==
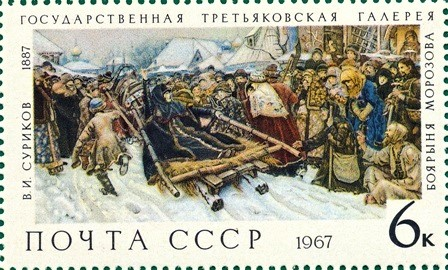
Painting on a postage stamp of the USSR, 1967.

At the traveling exhibition, the painting received mixed reviews. Although Surikov's new work, unlike The Morning of the Streltsy Execution, had a clear compositional center, it was also compared to an overly colorful Persian carpet. The critic Vladimir Stasov, however, was moved by the canvas and wrote afterwards:

Surikov has now created a picture that, in my opinion, is the first of all our paintings on subjects of Russian history. This picture, and our art that takes on the task of depicting ancient Russian history, have not yet gone beyond it.

In an essay on the painting, Vsevolod Garshin speculated as to why a "noblewoman, the owner of 8,000 souls of peasants and landed estates, valued in our money at several million", chose to end her life in a rotten dugout. Garshin rejected the academicians' talk about "irregularities in the position of the hands" and drawing defects, and considered Boyaryna Morozova an undeniable artistic triumph of Surikov's realistic style:

Exhausted by a long fast, a "metamorphosis," and the mental turmoil of recent days, the face—deeply passionate, devoted to a priceless dream—is presented before the eyes of the observer, who has long since left the picture. <...> The rude Moscow people, in fur coats, telogreya, torlopas, clumsy boots, and hats, stand before you as if alive. Such a depiction of our old Russian school before Peter's time has never been seen. It feels as though you are standing among these people and can feel their breath.

The public, willingly or unwillingly, compared the fanatic of pre-Petrine Russia with Stenka Razin and with the heroes of their time — the Narodniks and Narodnaya Volya. For example, Vladimir Korolenko, who himself had been exiled for his Narodnik beliefs, argued with those who saw Boyaryna Morozova as a hymn to medieval fanaticism:

She is so fearless in the face of torture that she compels us to sympathize with her heroic deed. It was in accordance with the spirit of the times. There is something great in a person who deliberately goes to their death for what they believe to be true. Such examples awaken in us faith in human nature and uplift the soul.

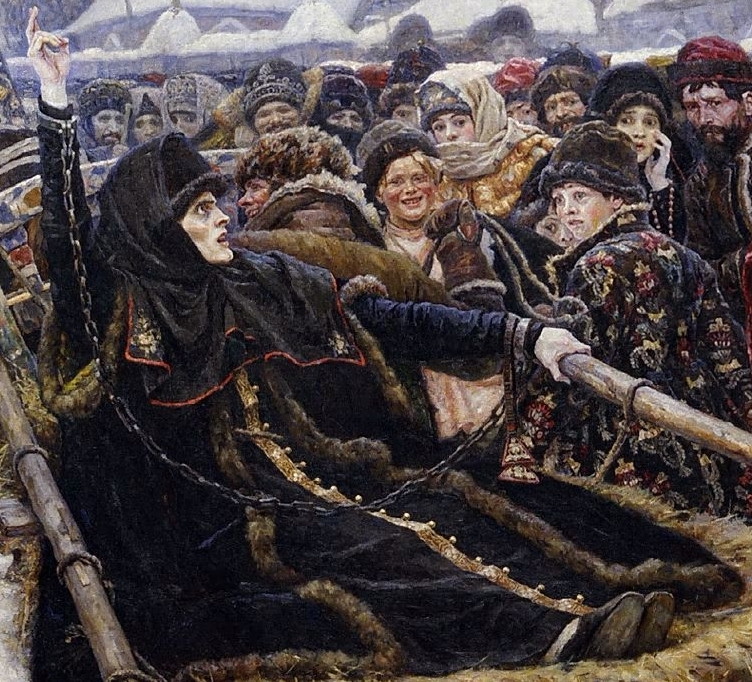
The painting's central part

The artists of the Mir Iskusstva appreciated the artistic merits of Surikov's historical paintings. They admired his departure from academic compositional solutions and the impressionistic polyphony of color textures. Alexander Benois saw a kind of dignity in Boyaryna Morozova — both in the crowding of the figures and in the lack of perspective depth, which, in his opinion, are designed to emphasize "typical and, in this case, symbolic narrow Moscow streets, and the somewhat provincial character of the whole scene". Following the blasphemous academics, he compares Surikov's polyphony to a carpet but sees nothing wrong with it:

In fact, this amazing work, with its harmony of variegated and bright colors, is worthy of being called a beautiful carpet by its very tone and colorful music, transporting us to the ancient, still original, and beautiful Russia.

== See also ==
- Feodosia Morozova

== Bibliography ==
- Гомберг-Вержбинская, Э. П. (1970). Передвижники (in Russian). Л.: Искусство. p. 236.
- Жуковский В. И., Пивоваров Д. В. (1991). Зримая сущность: (визуальное мышление в изобразительном искусстве) (in Russian). Свердловск: Изд. Урал, ун-та. p. 284. ISBN 5-7525-0159-8
- Жуковский, В. И. (2001). Формула гармонии: Секреты шедевров искусства / предисл.: Д. В. Пивоваров (in Russian). Красноярск: Бонус: Бонус. p. 206. ISBN 5-7867-0031-3
- Кеменов, В. С. (1987). В. И. Суриков: Историческая живопись 1870—1890 (in Russian). М.: Искусство. p. 396.
- Кеменов, В. С. (1991). Василий Иванович Суриков. Русские живописцы XIX века (in Russian) (Художник РСФСР ed.). p. 40.
- Кожевникова, Т. (2000). Василий Суриков. Мастера живописи (in Russian) (Белый город ed.). p. 48. ISBN 978-5-7793-0222-7.
- Панченко, А. М. (2000). О русской истории и культуре (in Russian). М.: Азбука.
