= Leonid Chernishyov =

Russian and Soviet architect and designer

Leonid Aleksandrovich Chernyshyov
- Леонид Александрович Чернышёв
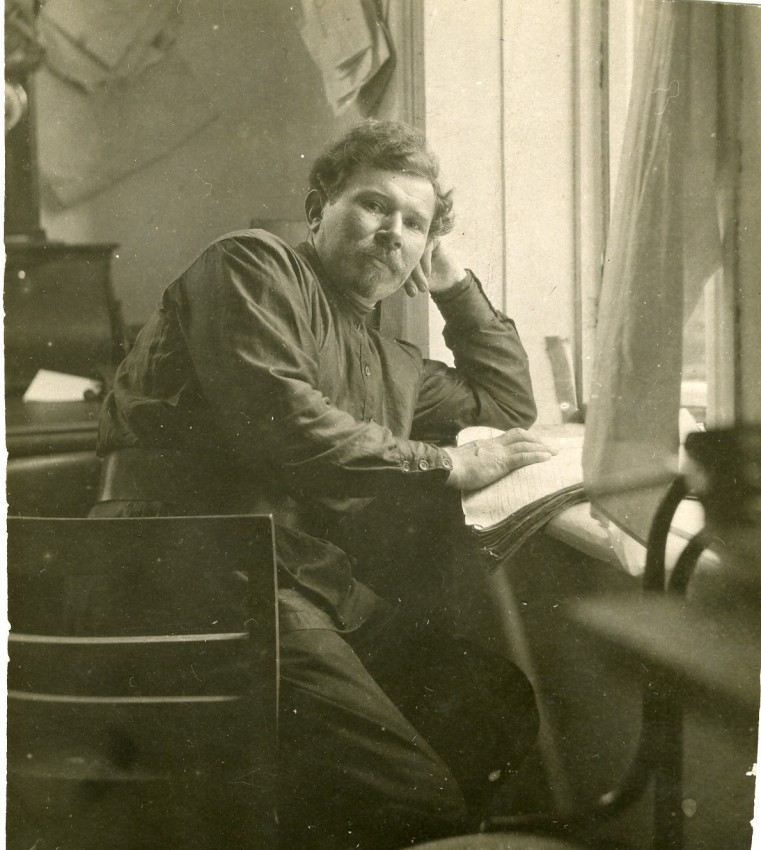
- Born: May 15, 1875; Sukhobuzim, Yeniseysk Governorate
- Died: 1932; Krasnoyarsk
- Occupation(s): Architect and designer

Leonid Aleksandrovich Chernyshyov (Russian: Леонид Александрович Чернышёв; 15 May 1875, Sukhobuzim, Yeniseysk Governorate – 1932, Krasnoyarsk) was a Russian and Soviet architect and designer.

== Biography ==
He was born into a peasant family. His mother was the daughter of a priest. In 1880, they moved from their village to Krasnoyarsk, where his father took work as a scribe. While studying at the gymnasium, he made friends with his classmate, Dmitri Karatanov. At that time, an artist named M. A. Rudchenko was lodging with Karatanov's family. He introduced both boys to drawing and painting. These hobbies were encouraged by the artist, Vasily Surikov, who was an old acquaintance of Leonid's family.

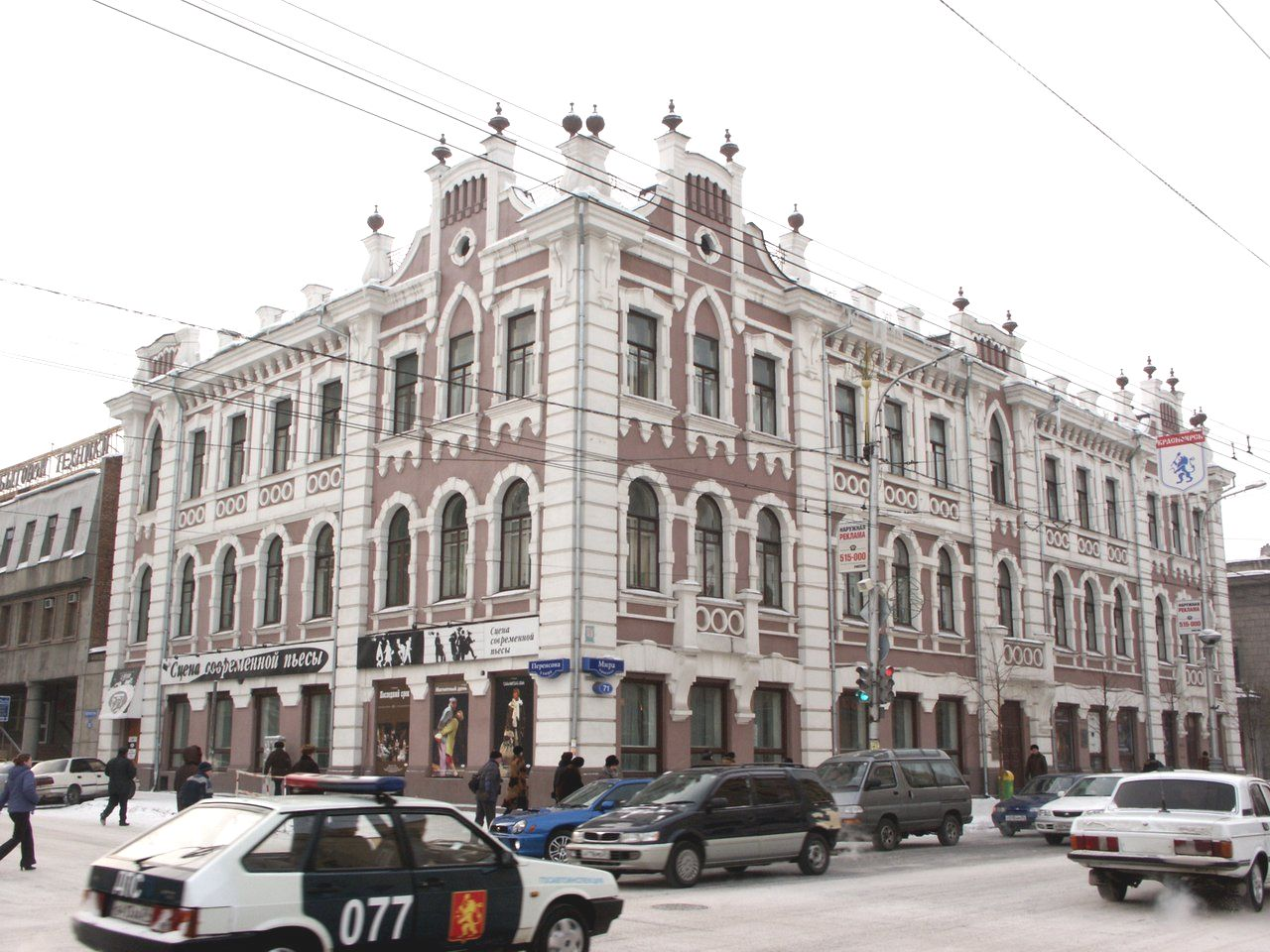
House of Merchants; now a theater

In 1892, on Surikov's advice, he left Krasnoyarsk to enroll at the Moscow School of Painting, Sculpture and Architecture. One of the students he met there was Sergei Chernyshyov (no relation), who would one day become Moscow's chief architect. Under his influence, Leonid decided to devote himself to architecture. He graduated in 1901. Two years later, he continued his education at the Imperial Academy of Arts in Saint Petersburg, under Professor Alexander Pomerantsev. In 1904, he participated in the construction of the Hotel Metropol Moscow and, in 1905, began a tour of Southern Russia to seek inspiration from nature. He returned to Krasnoyarsk in 1906, without completing his studies at the academy. The following year, he opened a small art school, with the assistance of Surikov.

His first major projects, the House of Merchants and various buildings for the resort at Lake Shira, were performed from 1909 to 1910. In the latter year, Siberia's first drawing school was opened and the Governor of Yeniseysk, Yakov Bologovsky, appointed him head teacher. His old friend, Karatanov, also became a teacher there.

During these years, he was also a member of the city council (Duma), a member of the Directorate at the Pushkin Drama Theater and a member of the school commission. In 1911, he designed pavilions for the First West Siberian Agricultural and Industrial Exhibition in Omsk. One of these was in Egyptian style and became the prototype for the Krasnoyarsk Museum of Local Lore. For this work, he received a commission of 11,000 Rubles, which enabled him to build his own home.

In 1918, he accepted the post of Provincial Engineer. Two years later, after the Soviet takeover, he was transferred to the "Department of State Structures", operated by the Provincial Economic Council, and became head of the Design Bureau. He was also a lecturer in architecture at the Higher Krasnoyarsk Polytechnic and a teacher at the School of the Union of Builders. In 1922, following a major reorganization, he once again became Provincial Engineer.

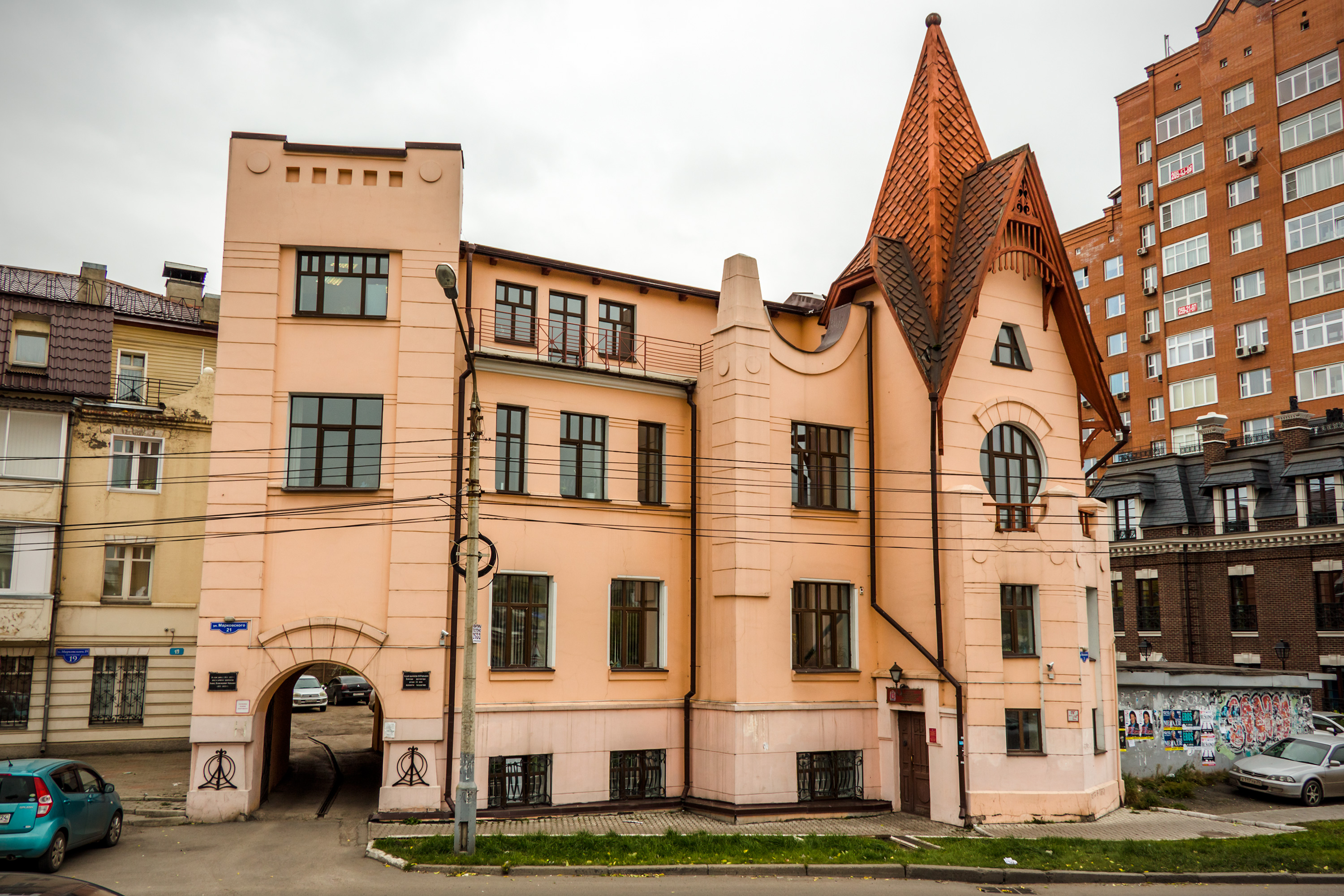
The Chernishyov Estate

He never married and devoted all of his time to work; sometimes as much as twenty hours per day. He was also a heavy smoker. As a result, his health deteriorated and he died of heart failure, sometime during the first year of the Soviet famine of 1932–33.
