= Vasily Surikov =

Russian artist (1848–1916)

- Василий Суриков
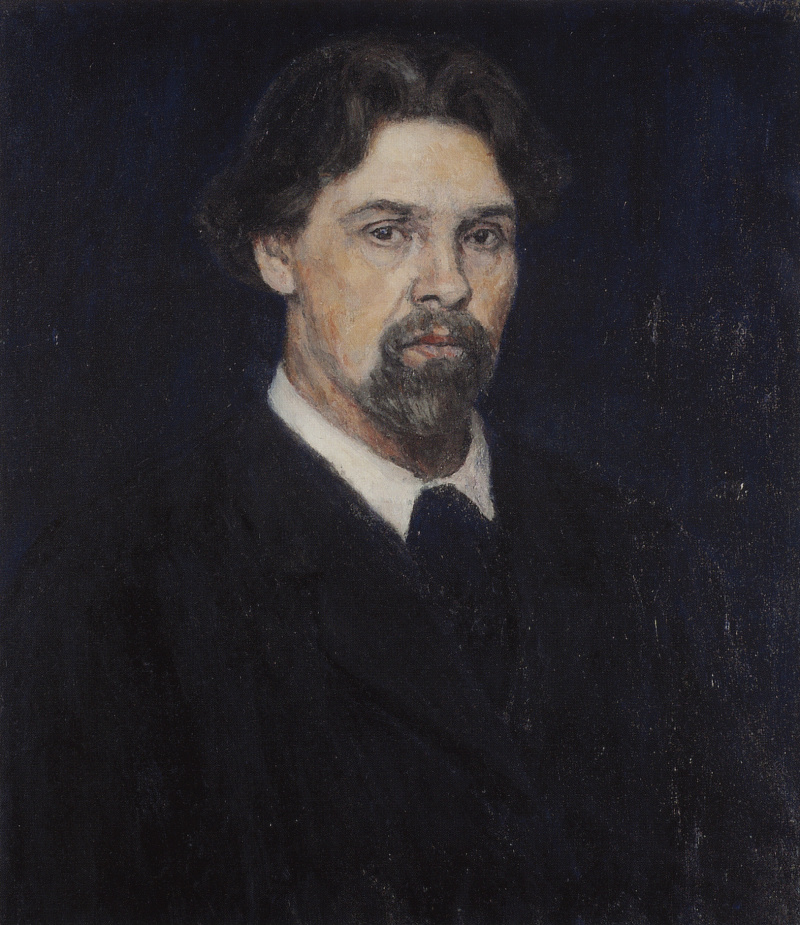
- Self-Portrait (1913, Tretyakov Gallery)
- Born: 24 January 1848; Krasnoyarsk, Russian Empire
- Died: 19 March 1916 (aged 68); Moscow, Russian Empire
- Resting place: Vagankovo Cemetery, Moscow
- Education: Imperial Academy of Arts (1875)
- Known for: History painting
- Notable work: The Morning of the Streltsy Execution (1881); Boyarynya Morozova (1887)
- Movement: Realism, Peredvizhniki
- Relatives: Pyotr Konchalovsky (son-in-law)
- Elected: Member Academy of Arts (1893); Full Member Academy of Arts (1895)
- Patrons: Pavel Tretyakov

Vasily Ivanovich Surikov (Russian: Василий Иванович Суриков; 24 January 1848 – 19 March 1916) was a Russian Realist painter, active in Moscow during Tsars Alexander III and Nicholas II's reigns, renowned for his large history pictures. Many of his works have become familiar to the general public through their use as illustrations.

== Biography ==
He was born to an old Yenisey Cossack family descending from Don Cossacks that had settled in Siberia. His father was a Collegiate Registrar, a civil service rank that often served as postmasters. In 1854, as a result of his father being reassigned, the family moved to the village of Sukhobuzimskoye, where he began his primary education.

In 1859, his father died of tuberculosis so the family returned to Krasnoyarsk and were forced to rent the second floor of their house to survive financially. He began drawing while attending the district school and was encouraged by the local art teacher. His first formal work dates from 1862, but his family could not afford to continue his education, and he became a clerk in a government office. This brought him into contact with Pavel Zamyatin, the governor of Yenisei, who was able to find him a patron: Pyotr Kuznetsov, a local merchant who owned several small gold mines.

In 1868, he rode on horseback to Saint Petersburg but was unable to qualify for admission to the Imperial Academy of Arts, so he studied at the drawing school of the Imperial Society for the Encouragement of the Arts. After a year there, he was allowed to audit classes at the academy and became a full-time pupil toward the end of 1869.

From 1869 to 1875, he studied with Pavel Chistyakov, Bogdan Willewalde, and Pyotr Shamshin, winning several medals. His great attention to composition earned him the nickname "The Composer". In 1875, he graduated with the title of Artist, first degree.

=== Career in Moscow ===
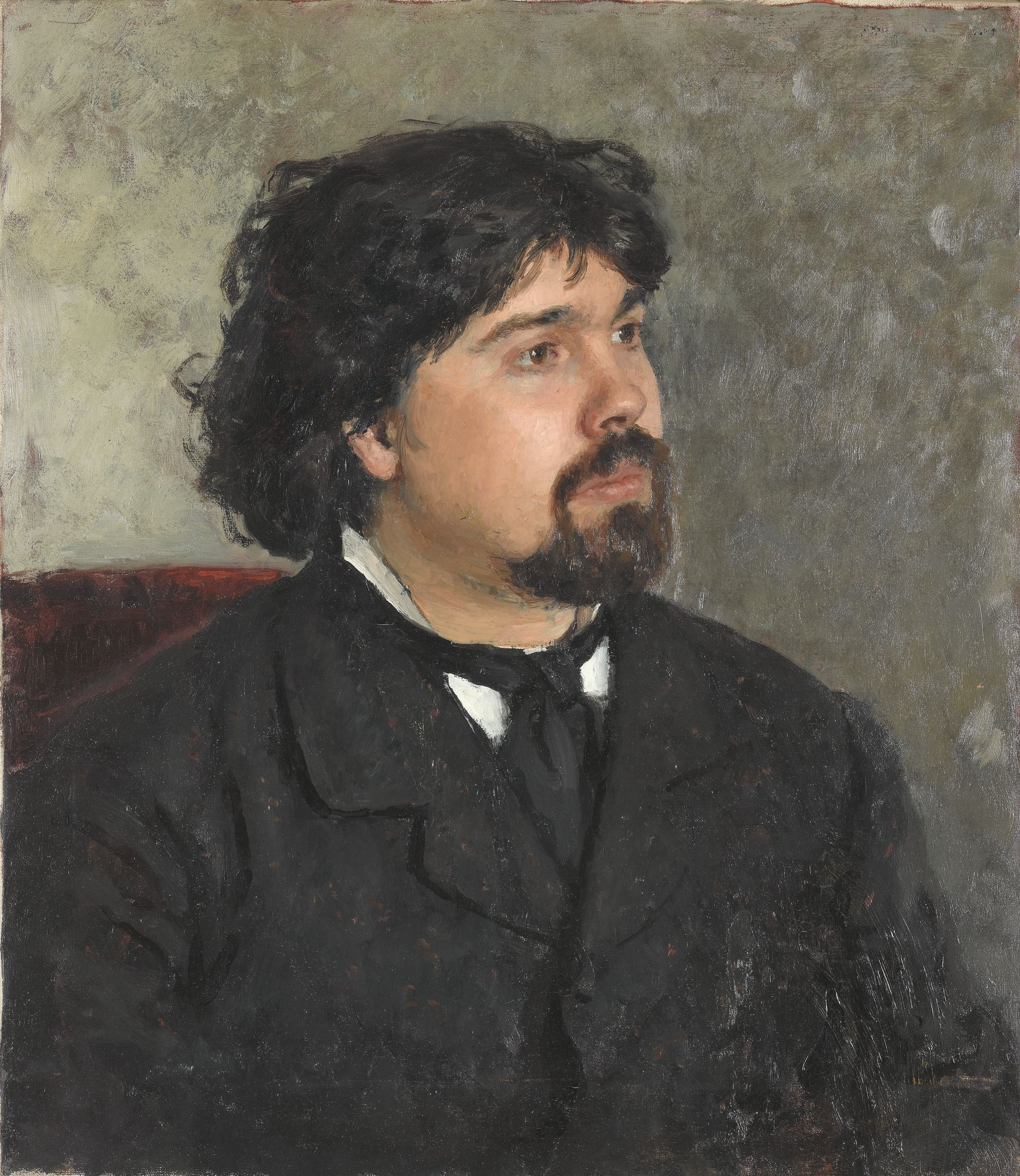
Portrait by Ilya Repin, 1877

In 1877, he received a commission to paint murals at the Cathedral of Christ the Saviour (then still under construction), and he moved to Moscow. Unable to afford a house, he lived in rented apartments and hotels and visited Krasnoyarsk whenever possible. In 1878, he married Elisabeth Charais (1858–1888), a French woman who was descended from the Decembrist, Pyotr Svistunov, on her mother's side. They had two daughters.

After that, he chose to remain in Moscow and began the series of historical paintings that would establish his reputation, starting with The Morning of the Streltsy Execution. In 1881, he had his first exhibition with the Peredvizhniki, an artists' cooperative. In 1883, Menshikov in Beryozovo was bought by Pavel Tretyakov for a sum that allowed him to take a European tour. In 1887, he added portraits to his repertoire, beginning with one of his mother.

In 1888, his wife died, and he returned to Krasnoyarsk with his daughters for two years. There he painted his most lighthearted picture, The Capture of Snow Town. This was followed by a visit to his ancestral home in Siberia. There, on the Ob River, he made sketches for one of his most familiar works, The Conquest of Siberia by Yermak Timofeyevich (an event in which some of his ancestors had participated). This brought him a full membership in the Imperial Academy. In 1897, he visited Switzerland and painted Suvorov Crossing the Alps, which was purchased by Tsar Nicholas II.

In 1907, he left the Peredvizhniki and joined the Union of Russian Artists. Three years later, he visited Spain, together with his son-in-law, Pyotr Konchalovsky. That same year, he and the architect Leonid Chernishyov opened an art school. Four years later, he had an extended stay in Krasnoyarsk, painting landscapes.

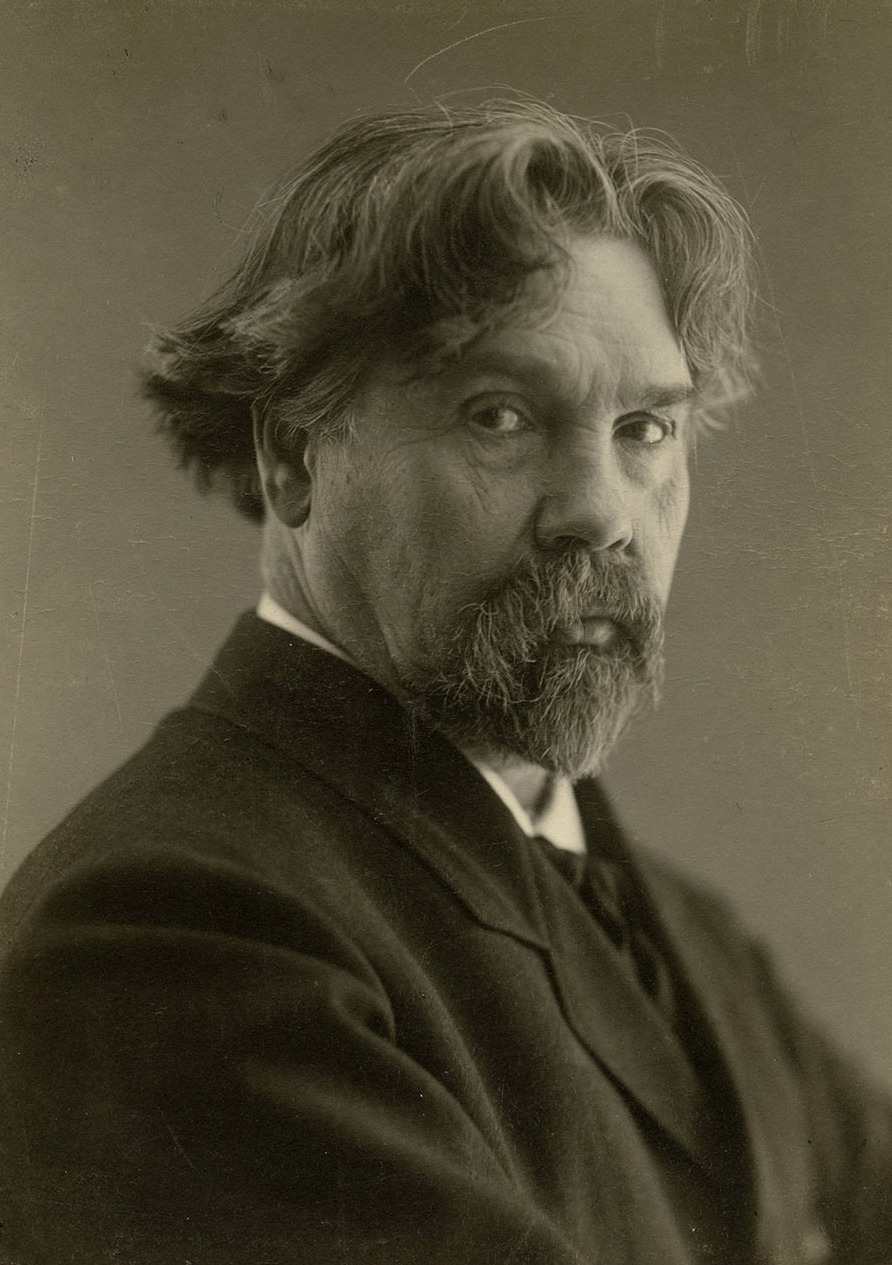
Vasily Surikov, 1909

By this time, he was suffering from chronic coronary disease. A trip to Crimea for treatment in 1915 failed to ameliorate the problem, and he died early the following year after returning to Moscow. He was buried at Vagankovo Cemetery, next to his wife.

In 1948, on the 100th anniversary of his birth, his estate in Krasnoyarsk became a museum; the same year, the Moscow Art Institute was renamed in his honor, despite Surikov's dislike of teaching. Two monuments have been erected in Krasnoyarsk, in 1954 and in 2002. A biographical movie of his life (Vasily Surikov) was made by Mosfilm in 1959, written by Emil Braginsky, and directed by Anatoly Rybakov, with Yevgeni Lazarev as Surikov and Larisa Kadochnikova as Elisabeth. Numerous streets and squares throughout Russia have been named after him, as well as a crater on Mercury.

== Principal works ==
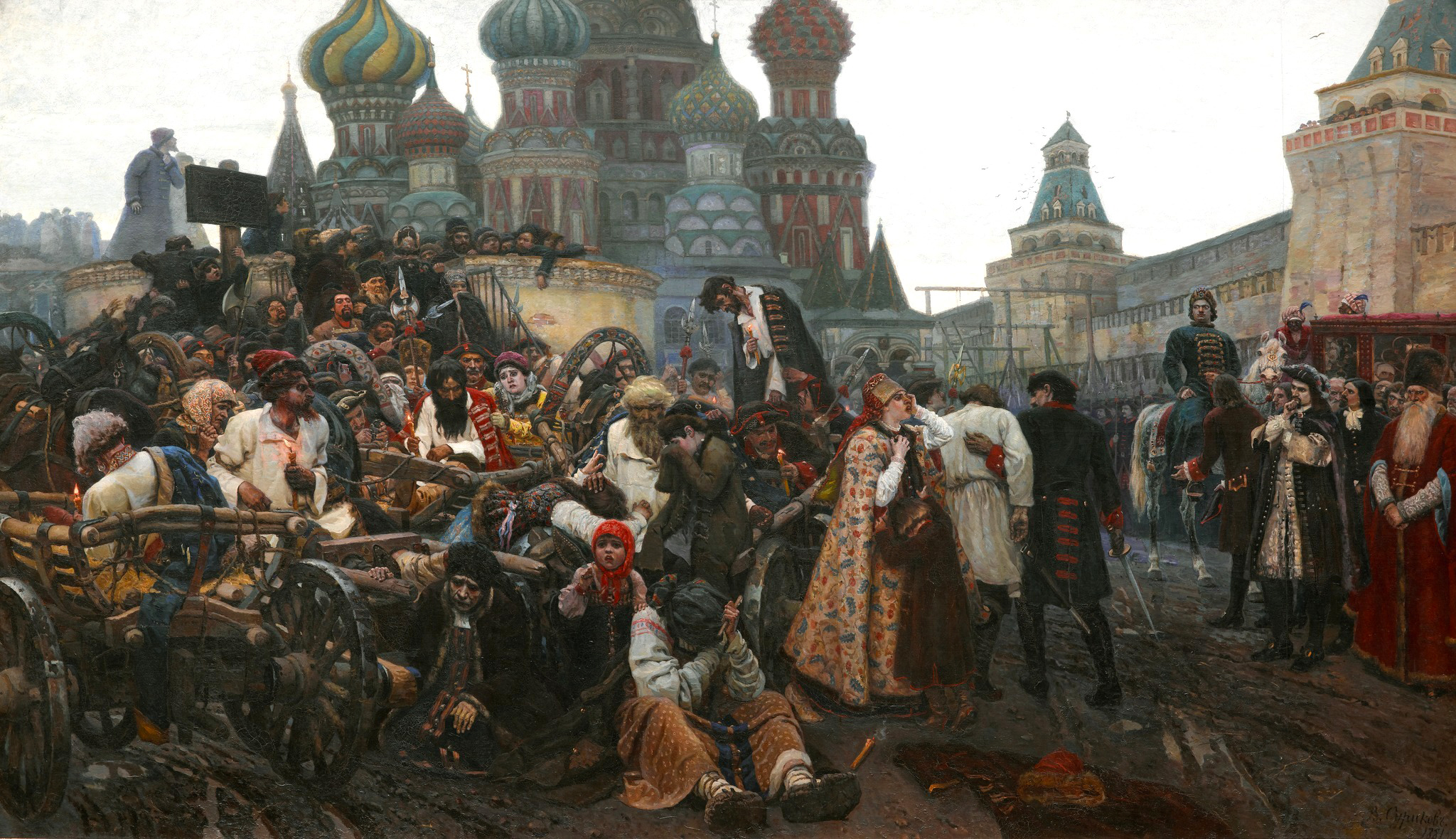
The Morning of the Streltsy Execution

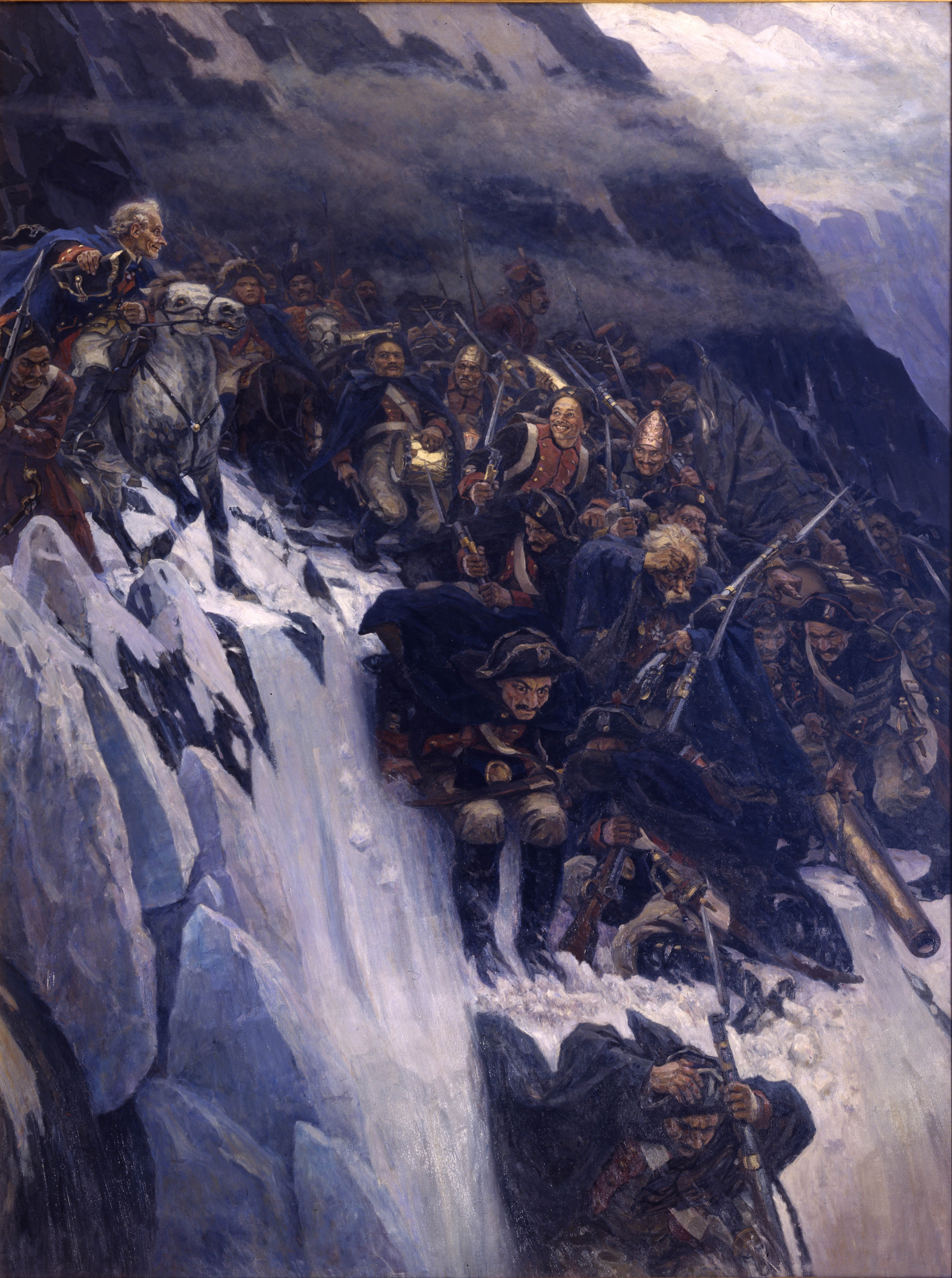
Suvorov crossing the Alps

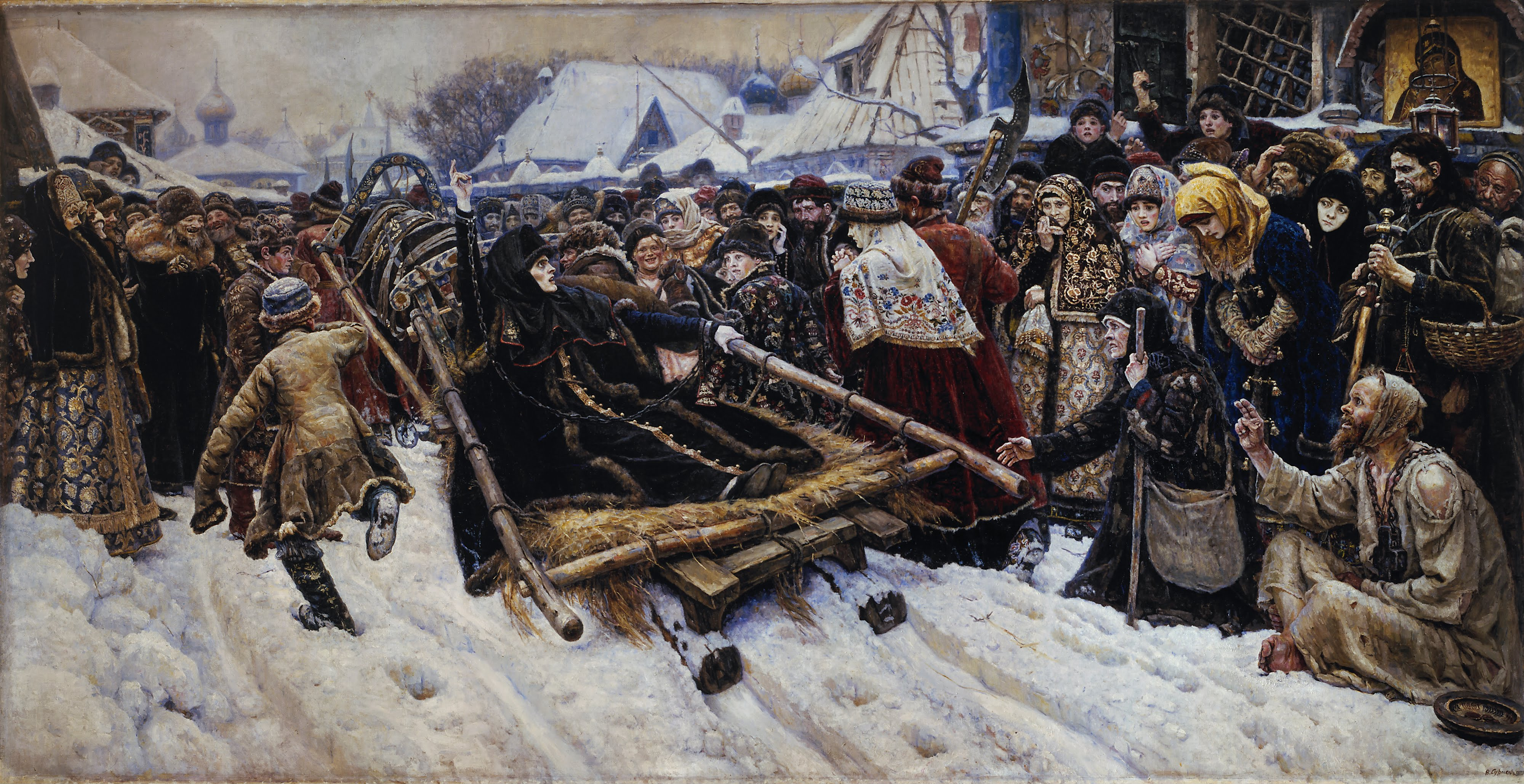
Boyarina Morozova

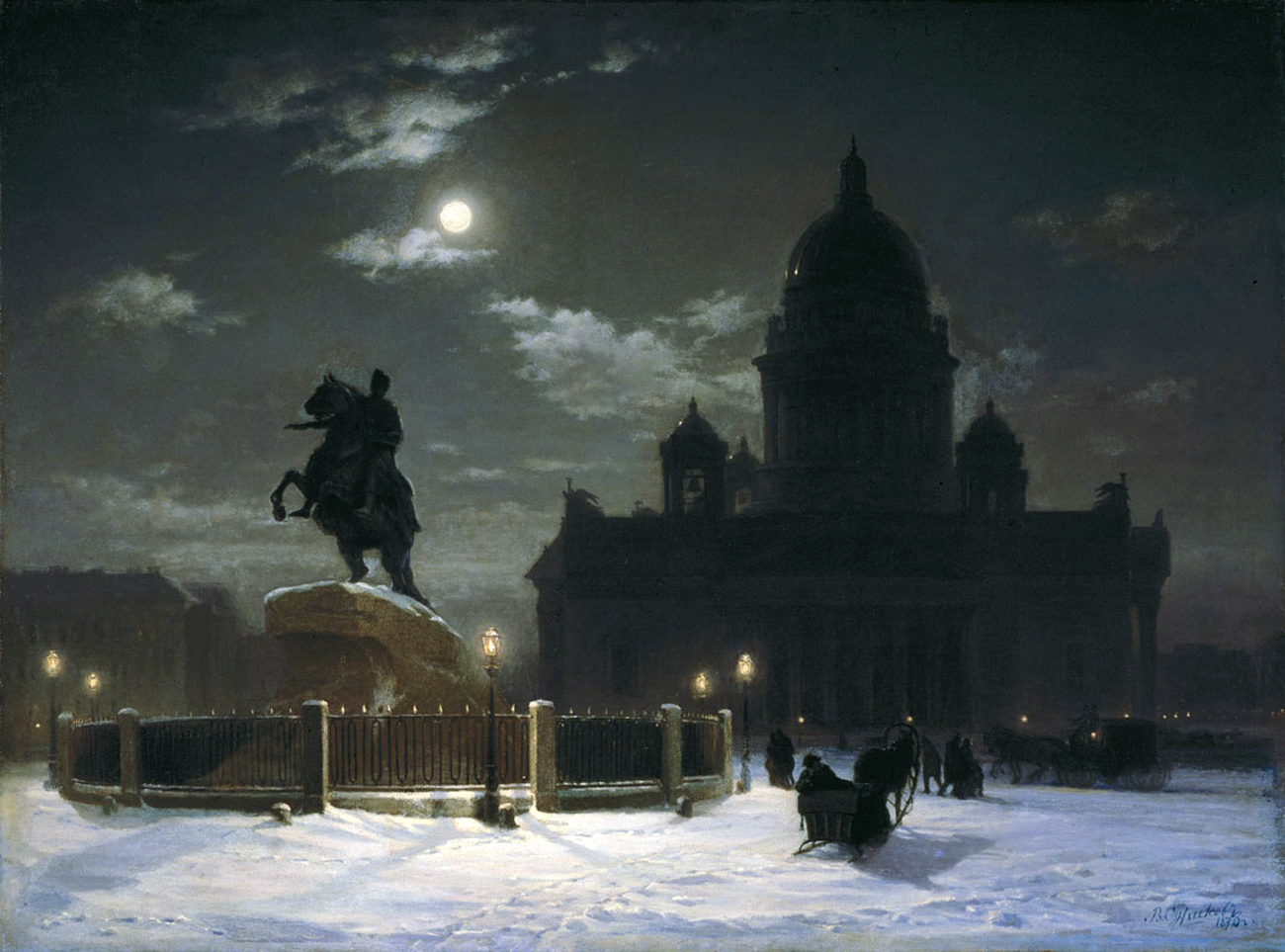
The Bronze Horseman

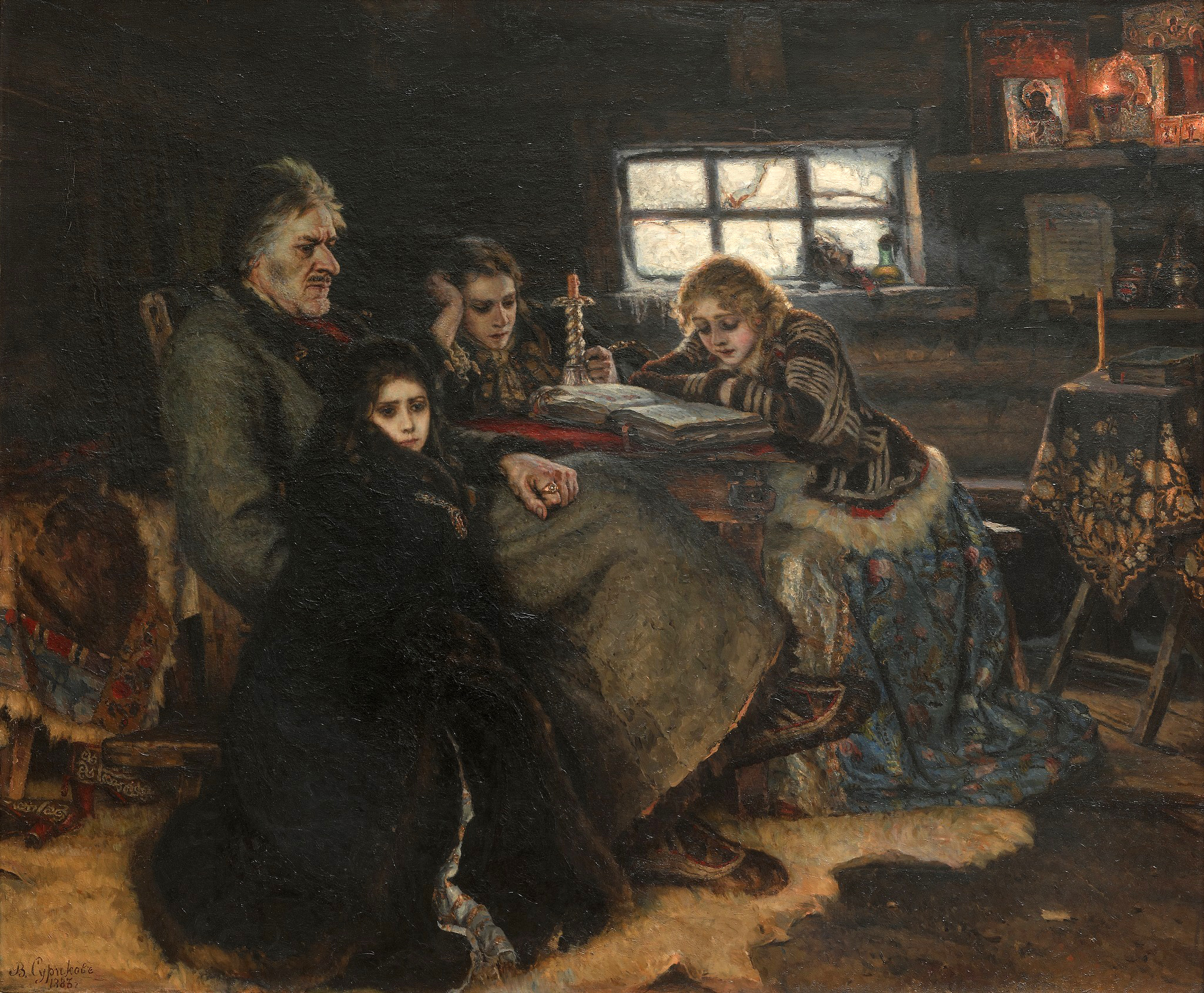
Menshikov in Beryozovo

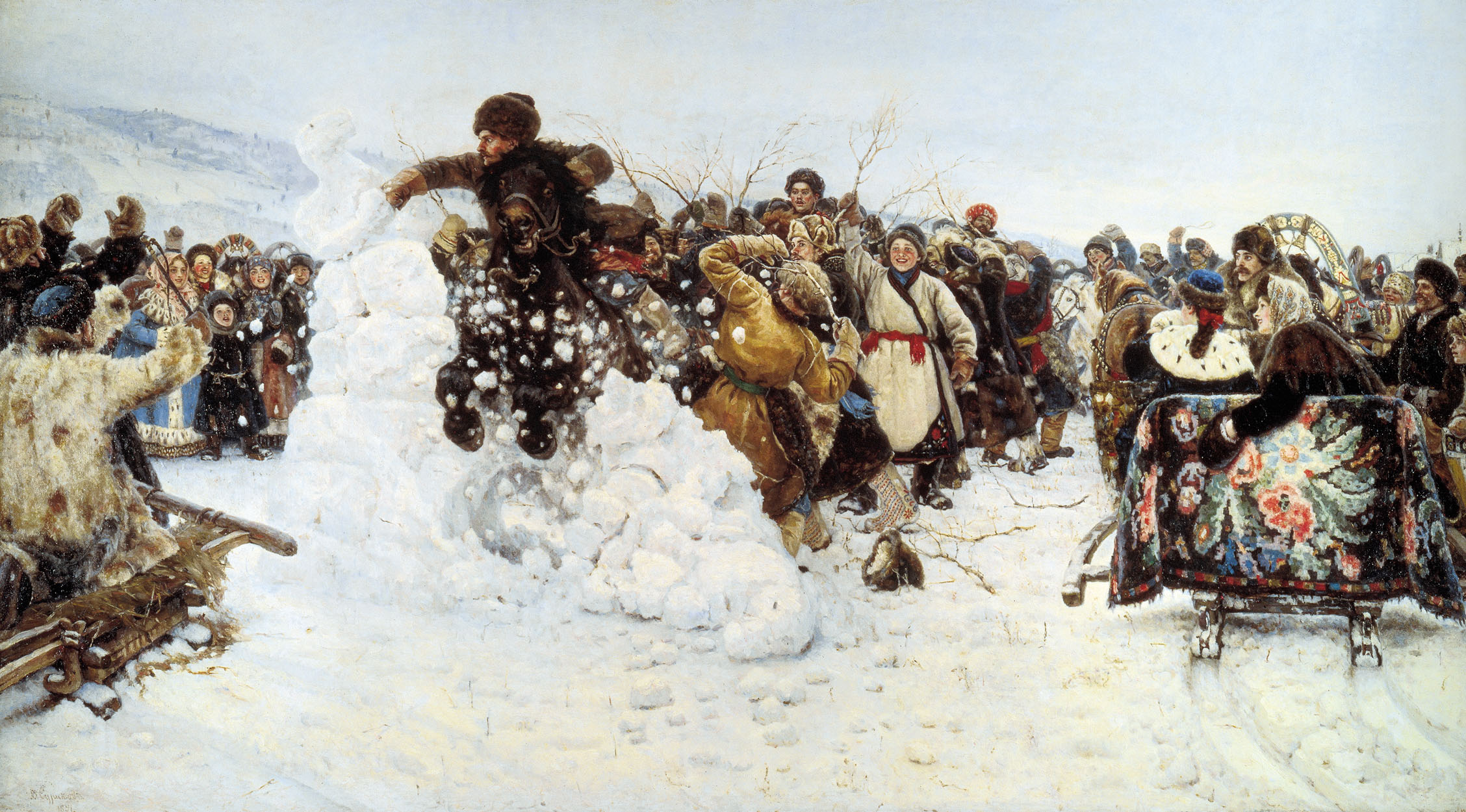
The Capture of Snow Town

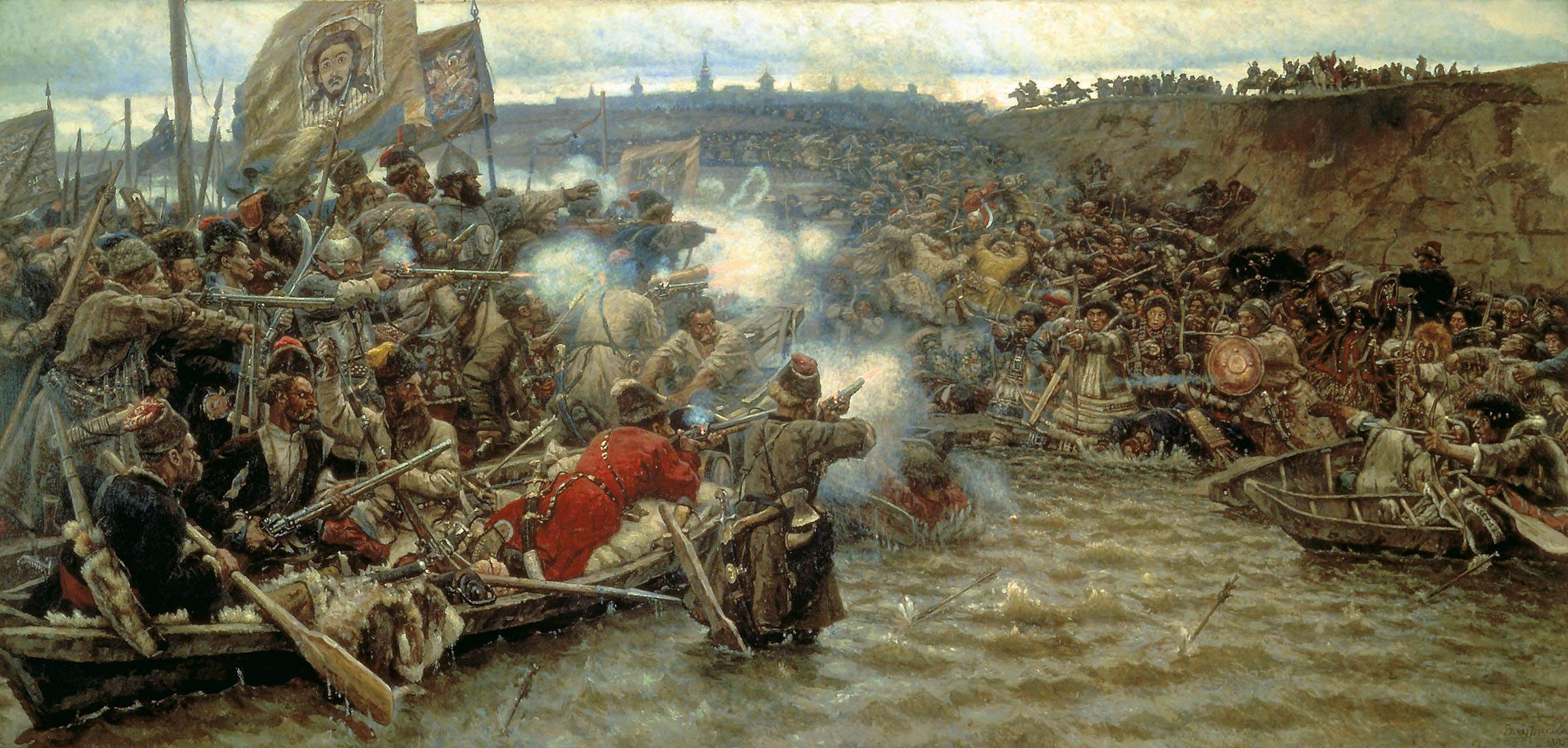
The Conquest of Siberia by Yermak Timofeyevich

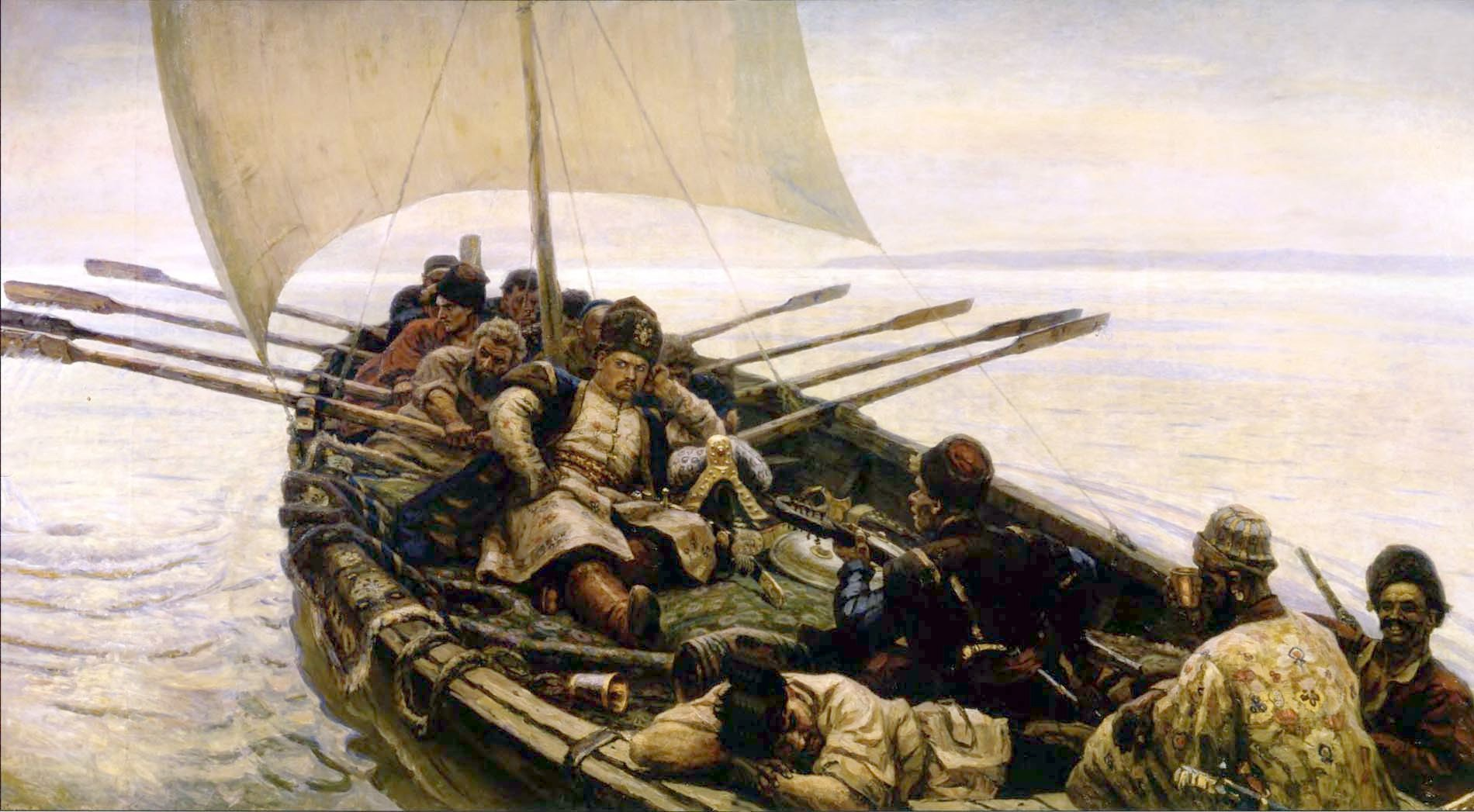
Stenka Razin
