= The Morning of the Streltsy Execution =

Painting by Vasily Surikov

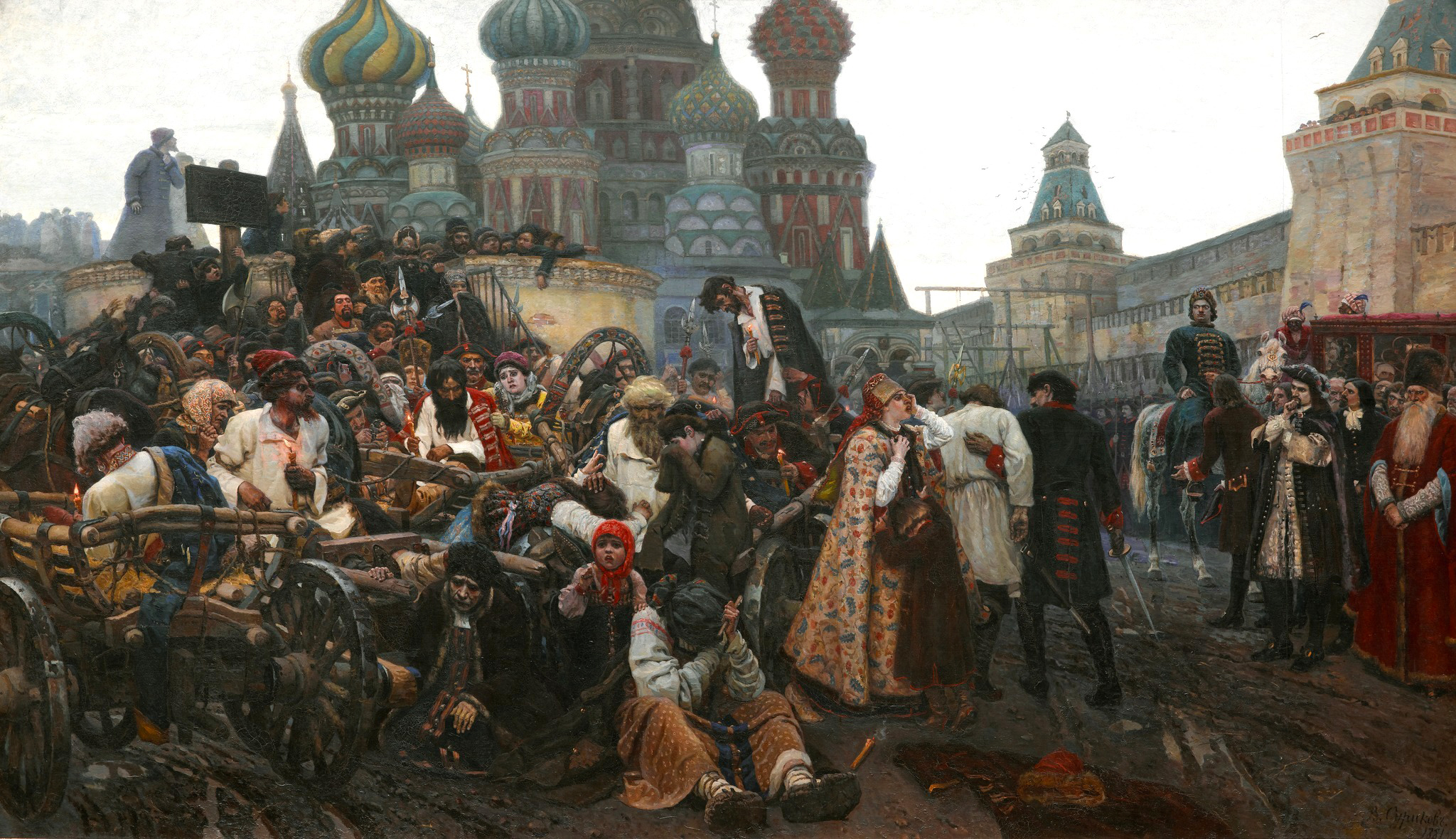
- Morning of the Streltsy Execution
- Artist: Vasily Surikov
- Year: 1881
- Dimensions: 218 cm × 379 cm (86 in × 149 in)
- Location: Tretyakov Gallery; Moscow

The Morning of the Streltsy Execution is a painting by Vasily Ivanovich Surikov, painted in 1881. It illustrates the public execution after the Streltsy's failed attempted uprising of 1698 before the walls of the Kremlin.

The painting can be found at the Tretyakov Gallery in Moscow.
