= Sukhobuzimsky District =

Sukhobuzimsky District Сухобузимский район (Russian)
- District
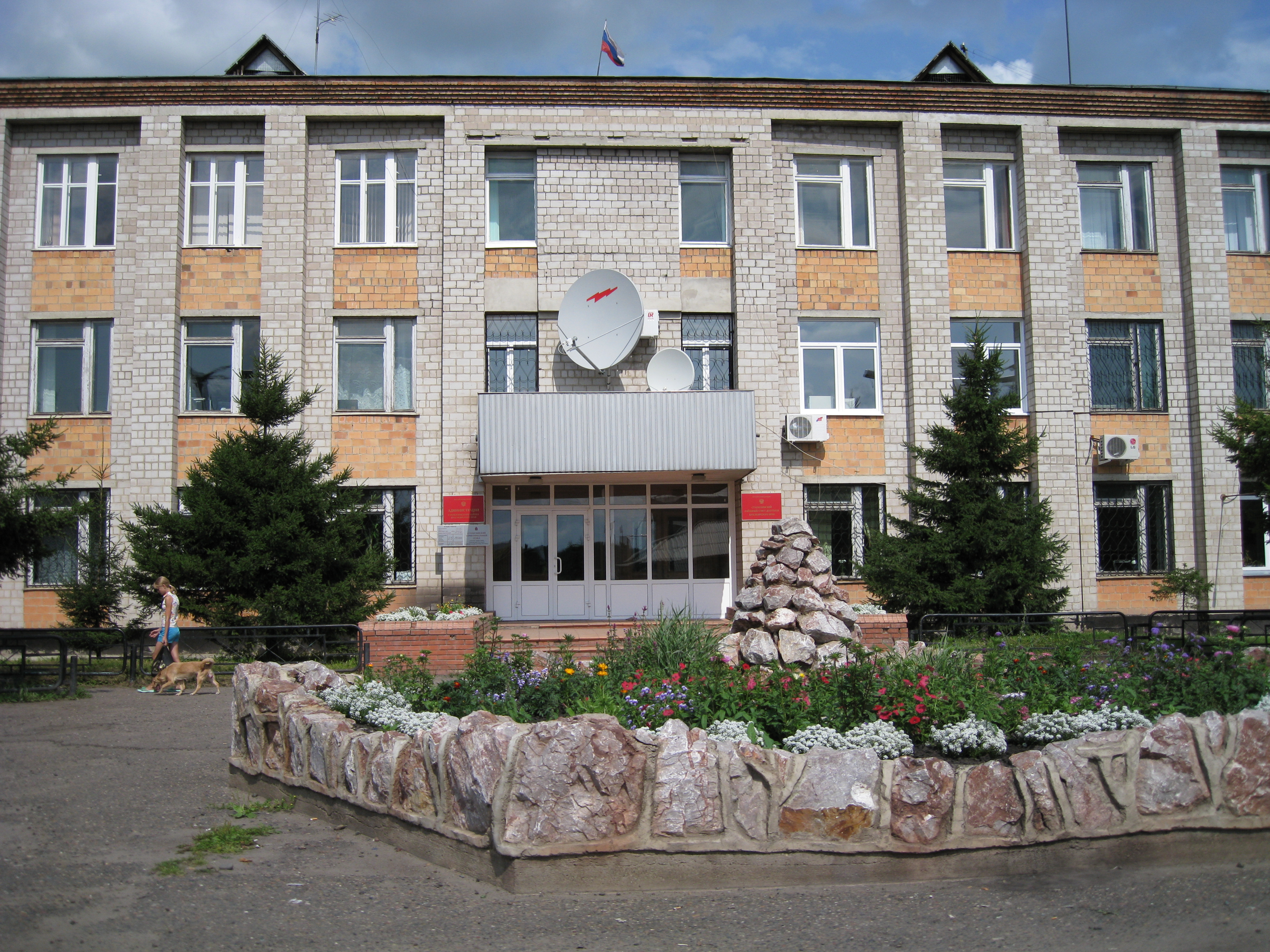
- Sukhobuzimsky District Administration building in the selo of Sukhobuzimskoye

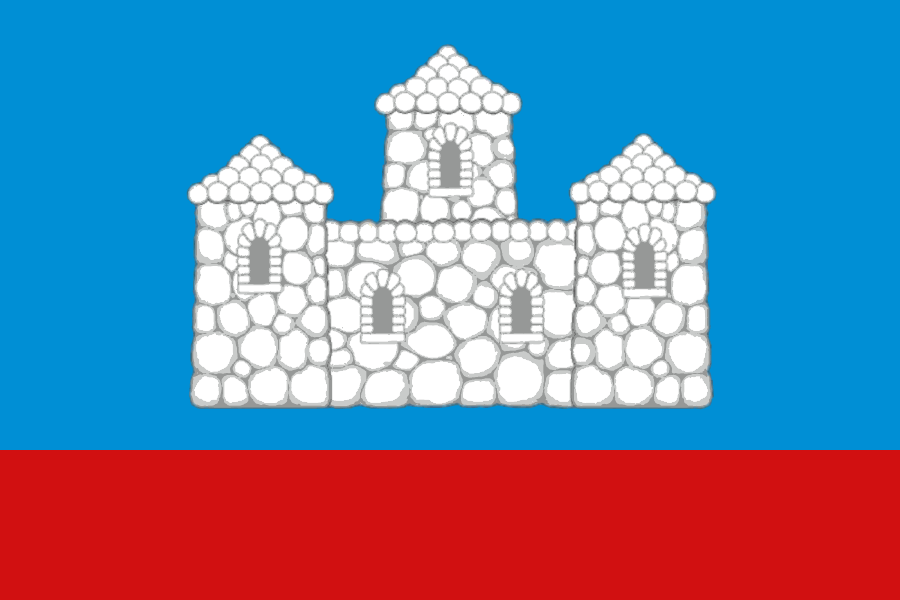
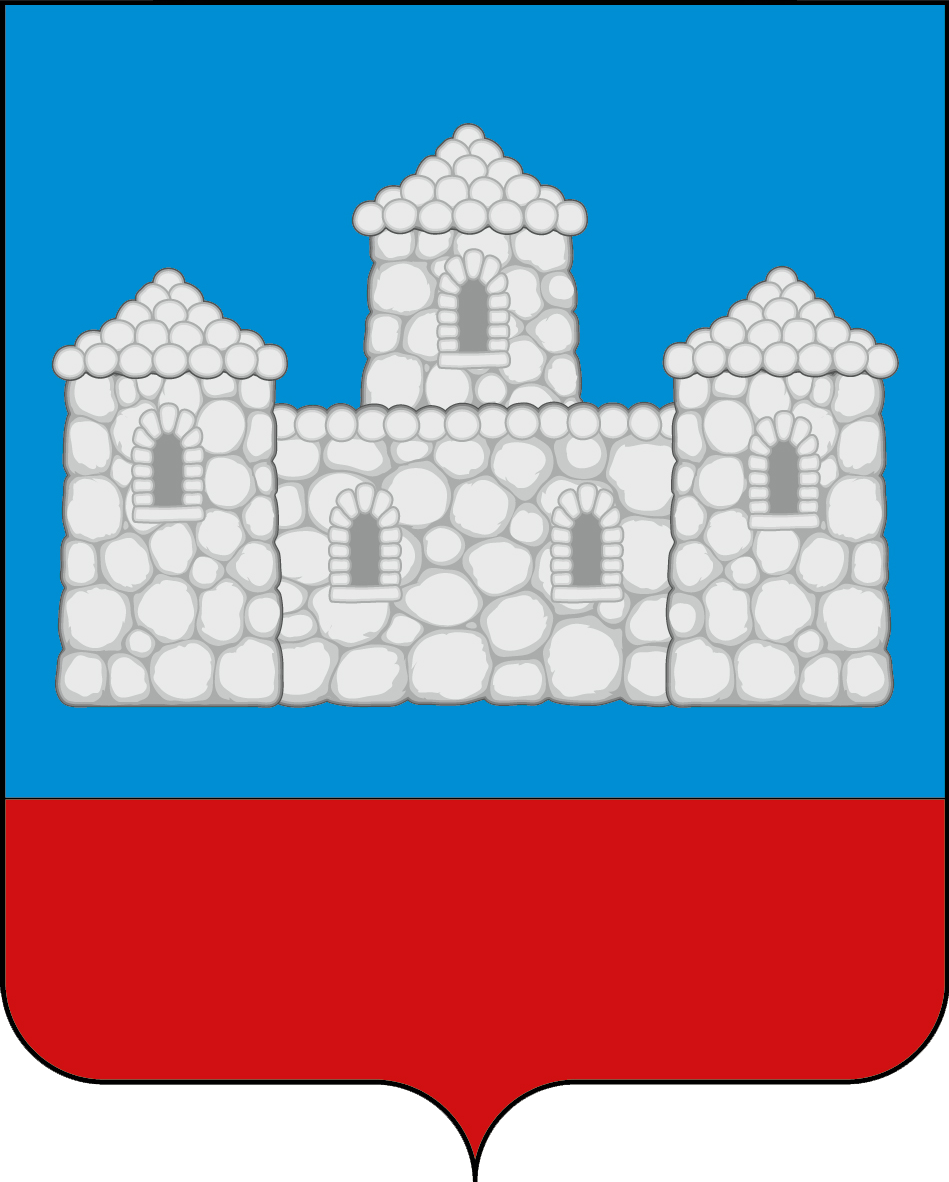
- Flag Coat of arms
- Location of Sukhobuzimsky District in Krasnoyarsk Krai
- Coordinates: 56°30′N 93°17′E
- Country: Russia
- Federal subject: Krasnoyarsk Krai
- Established: April 4, 1924
- Administrative center: Sukhobuzimskoye

Government
  - Type: Local government
  - Body: Sukhobuzimsky District Council of Deputies
  - Head: Viktor Vlisko

Area
  - Total: 5,612 km^{2} (2,167 sq mi)

Population (2010 Census)
  - Total: 20,537
  - Density: 3.659/km^{2} (9.478/sq mi)
  - Urban: 0%
  - Rural: 100%

Administrative structure
  - Administrative divisions: 9 Selsoviets
  - Inhabited localities: 35 rural localities

Municipal structure
  - Municipally incorporated as: Sukhobuzimsky Municipal District
  - Municipal divisions: 0 urban settlements, 9 rural settlements
- Time zone: UTC+7 (MSK+4)
- OKTMO ID: 04651000
- Website: https://www.suhobuzimo.ru

Sukhobuzimsky District (Russian: Сухобу́зимский райо́н) is an administrative and municipal district (raion), one of the forty-three in Krasnoyarsk Krai, Russia. It is located in the south of the krai. The area of the district is 5,612 square kilometers (2,167 sq mi). Its administrative center is the rural locality (a selo) of Sukhobuzimskoye. Population: 20,537 (2010 census); 23,445 (2002 census); 25,460 (1989 Soviet census). The population of Sukhobuzimskoye accounts for 21.2% of the district's total population.

== History ==
The district was founded on April 4, 1924.

== Government ==
As of 2013, the Head of the district and the Chairman of the District Council is Viktor P. Vlisko.
