= Sukhobuzimskoye =

Sukhobuzimskoye Сухобузимское
- Rural locality
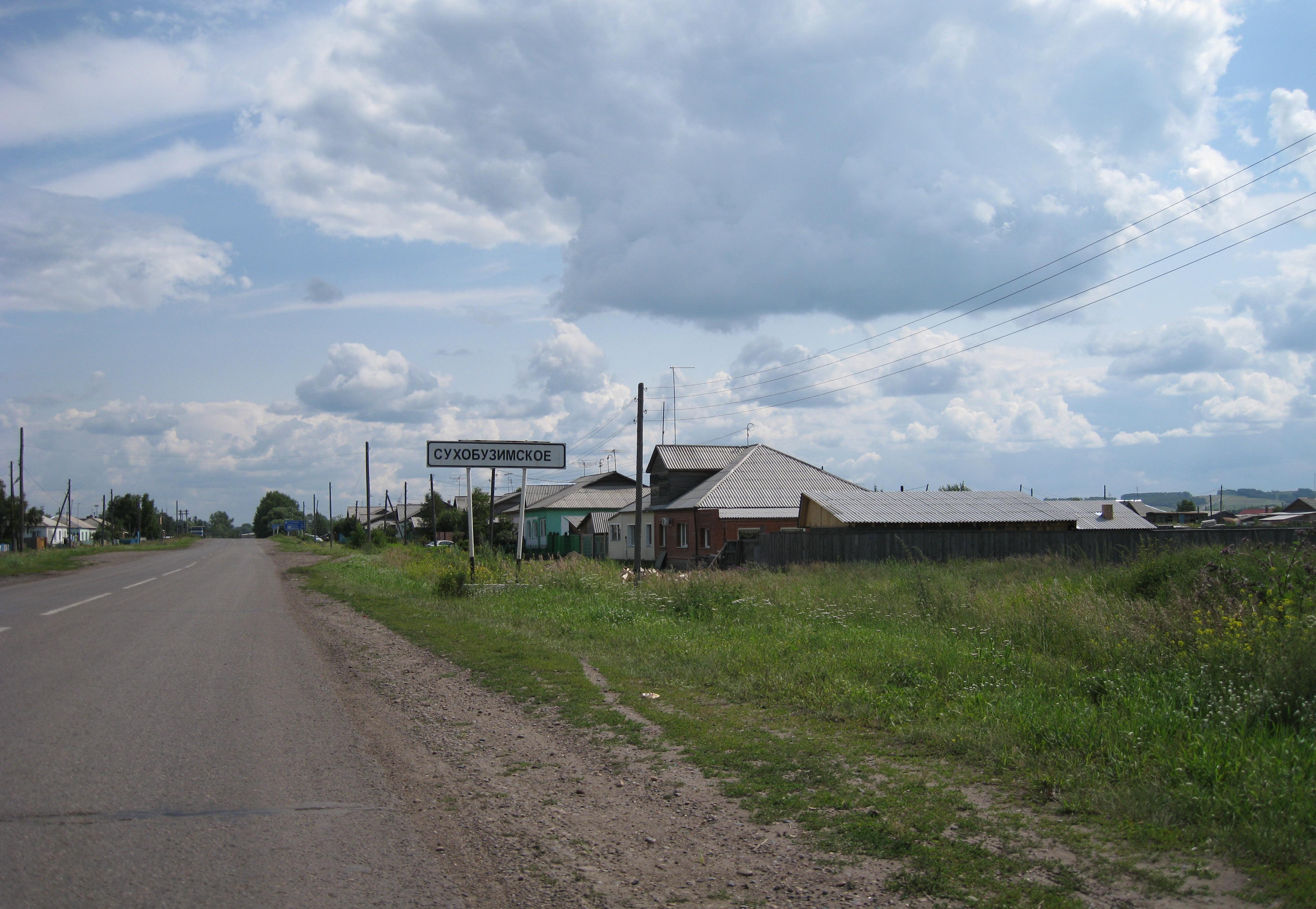
- at the entrance of the village

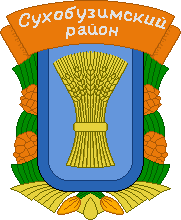
- Coat of arms
- Interactive map of Sukhobuzimskoye
- Location of Sukhobuzimskoye Sukhobuzimskoye (Krasnoyarsk Krai)
- Country: Russia
- Federal subject: Krasnoyarsk Krai
- Administrative district: Sukhobuzimsky District
- selsovetSelsoviet: Sukhobuzimsky selsovet
- Founded: 1710

Population (2010 Census)
  - Total: 4,361
  - Estimate (2010): 4,293
- Time zone: UTC+7 (MSK+4)
- Postal code: 663040
- OKTMO ID: 04651422101

Sukhobuzimskoye (Russian: Сухобу́зимское) is a rural locality (a selo) and the administrative center of Sukhobuzimsky District of Krasnoyarsk Krai, Russia, located 70 kilometers (43 mi) from Krasnoyarsk. Population: 4,361 (2010 census); 4,622 (2002 census); 5,466 (1989 Soviet census).
