= Major's marriage proposal =

1848 painting by Russian artist Pavel Fedotov

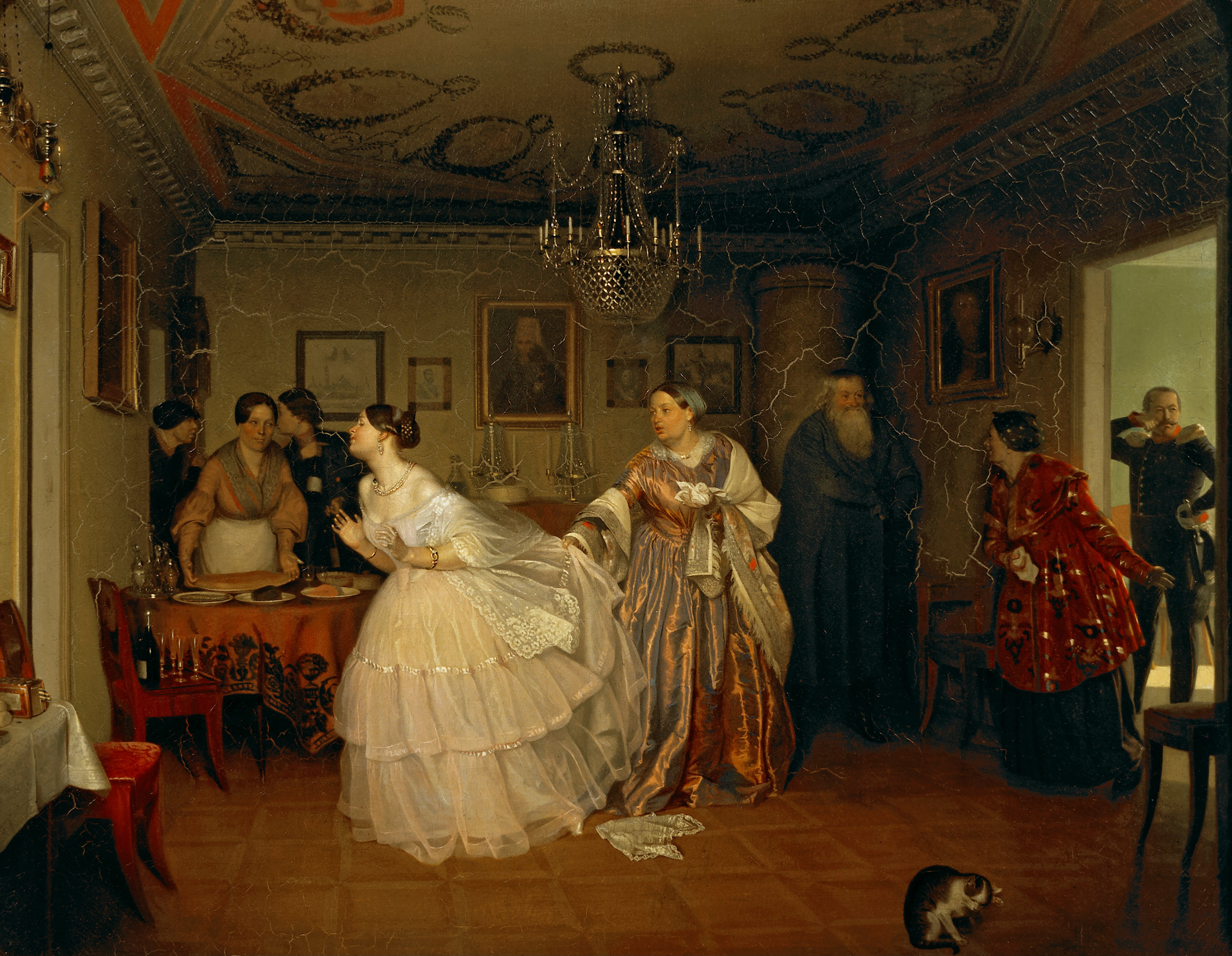
- Artist: Pavel Fedotov
- Year: 1848
- Medium: Oil on canvas
- Dimensions: 58,3 cm × 75,4 cm (230 in × 297 in)
- Location: Tretyakov Gallery, Moscow

Major's marriage proposal is a painting by the Russian artist Pavel Fedotov (1815–1852), painted in 1848. It is owned by the State Tretyakov Gallery (inv. 5210). The size of the painting is 58.3×75.4 cm.

Pavel Fedotov began to work on the canvas "Major's marriage proposal" (also known as "The Major's Marriage") in 1848; the painting was completed in the same year. In the fall of 1849, the canvas, titled "Correction of Circumstances, or Matchmaking", was exhibited at the Academy of Arts along with two other earlier paintings by the artist, "The Fresh Cavalier" (1846) and "The Discerning Bride" (1847). According to Alexander Benois, Fedotov's paintings had "a colossal success at the exhibition, unprecedented since the time of 'Pompeii". The Academy of Arts awarded Fedotov the title of Academician for his painting "Major's marriage proposal".

Art historian Galina Leontieva wrote that "Major's marriage proposal" is "one of the most remarkable works of Russian painting of the first half of the 19th century", which "due to the amazing truth of the characters, the significance of the problem raised in it turned out to be much more serious than the original idea of the artist". The art historian Dmitry Sarabianov called the painting "one of the highest achievements of Fedotov in the field of pictorial art".

A variant of "Major's marriage proposal", which the artist worked on in 1850-1852, is kept in the State Russian Museum in St. Petersburg (canvas, oil, 56×76 cm, inv. Zh-4521). Although the subject and composition are generally preserved, the version in the Russian Museum has a number of significant differences from the painting in the Tretyakov Gallery.

== History ==
At the end of 1843 Pavel Fedotov, who had served about ten years in the Finnish Life Guards Regiment resigned, settled on line 16 of Vasilyevsky Island in St. Petersburg and devoted himself entirely to artistic activity. Initially intending to become a military art painter, he soon realized that he preferred the genre art, within the framework of which he created a series of multi-figure sepia paintings in 1844-1846. In 1846, Fedotov created his first painting, "The Fresh Cavalier", and in 1847 he painted another canvas, "The Discerning Bride". In 1848 Pavel Fedotov began to work on the painting "Major's marriage proposal" (also known as "The Major's Marriage"), which was completed in the same year. At the request of Karl Bryullov, Fedotov received 700 rubles in commissions from the Imperial Academy of Arts to complete the painting, which could be used, among other things, for the models, costumes, and other materials. According to the sculptor Nikolai Ramazanov, who was a friend of the artist, while working on "Major's marriage proposal" Fedotov "did not allow himself to do anything without nature" — the bride's dress was specially ordered for the occasion; many other things, "down to the smallest detail", were bought or rented by him.

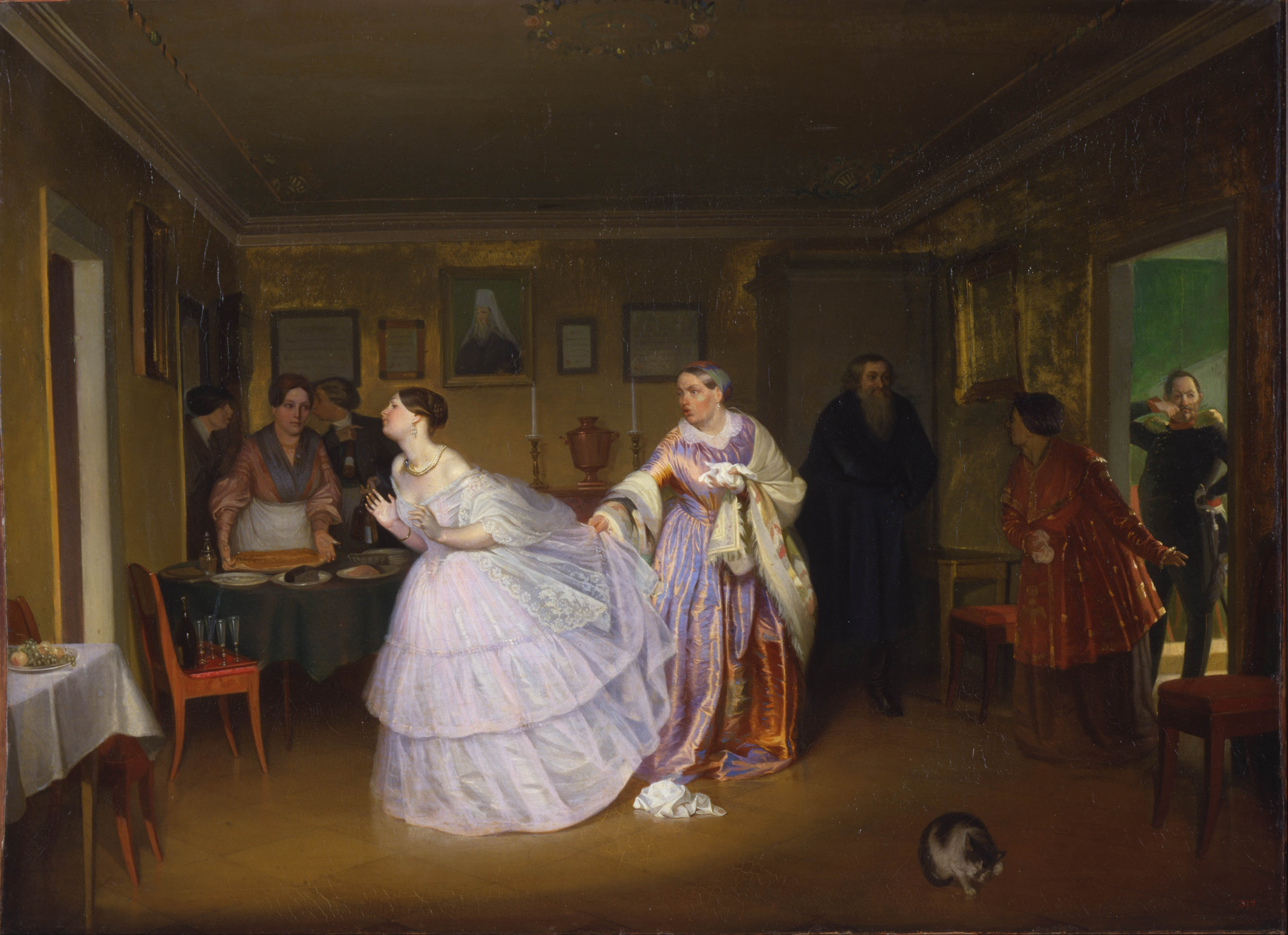
Major's marriage proposal (author's copy, canvas, oil, 56×76 cm, 1850-1852, Russian State Museum)

In October 1849, the canvas was shown at an exhibition of the Academy of Arts under the title "Correction of Circumstances, or Marriage Proposal". At the same exhibition, two other paintings by Fedotov were exhibited — "The Fresh Cavalier" and "The Discerning Bride". According to the artist and critic Alexander Benois, Fedotov's paintings presented at the academic exhibition "were a colossal success, unprecedented since the time of 'Pompeii'", earning "the enthusiastic approval not only of the public, but also, apparently by misunderstanding, of academic professors, including Karl Bryullov himself". For the painting "Major's marriage proposal" the Academy of Arts awarded the artist the title of Academician.

Fedotov wrote a poetic description of his painting, the so-called raceya, which he read to the visitors of the exhibition in 1849. According to other data, Fedotov first wrote a short poetic description, and a longer raceya with a detailed description of the painting was written by him for two personal exhibitions in Moscow in 1850, which presented the painting "Major's marriage proposal" — in the gallery of A. F. Rostopchin and in the Moscow School of Painting, Sculpture and Architecture.

Subsequently, Fedotov sold the paintings "Major's marriage proposal" and "Fresh Cavalier" to Feodor Pryanishnikov, but received a much smaller sum for them than he had hoped for: initially he offered two thousand rubles for "Marriage Proposal", in the final transaction Pryanishnikov announced to the artist that he could pay only half; Fedotov, who was in financial difficulties, was forced to agree. Since then, the canvas "Major's marriage proposal" has been in Pryanishnikov's collection in St. Petersburg; in the description of his collection published in 1853, the painting appeared under the title "The Arrival of the Bridegroom". After Pryanishnikov's death in 1867, the painting was transferred to the Rumyantsev Museum in Moscow; in its catalog, published in 1915, it had a double title — "The Arrival of the Bridegroom (Major's marriage proposal)". In 1925, after the dissolution of the Rumyantsev Museum, the painting was transferred to the State Tretyakov Gallery.

In 1850-1852 Fedotov painted a variant repetition of the painting "Major's marriage proposal" (alternatively titled "Watching in a Merchant's House"), which is now in the State Russian Museum in St. Petersburg (canvas, oil on canvas, 56×76 cm; earlier in the catalog as the date of creation of the painting "about 1851", the dating "1850-1852" was proposed in the catalog issued for the 1993 exhibition). Until 1870, this variant was in the collection of the Moscow patron Vasily Kokorev, and then — in the Tsarskoe Selo Alexander Palace, from where it was transferred in 1897 to the Russian Museum of Emperor Alexander III (now — the State Russian Museum). According to the inscription on the back of the canvas made by the restorer A. Sidorov, the oil layer with the picture was transferred from the old canvas to a new one in 1886. Although the action and the position of the characters are generally preserved, the version in the Russian Museum has a number of significant differences from the painting in the Tretyakov Gallery.

== Description ==
=== Plot and composition ===
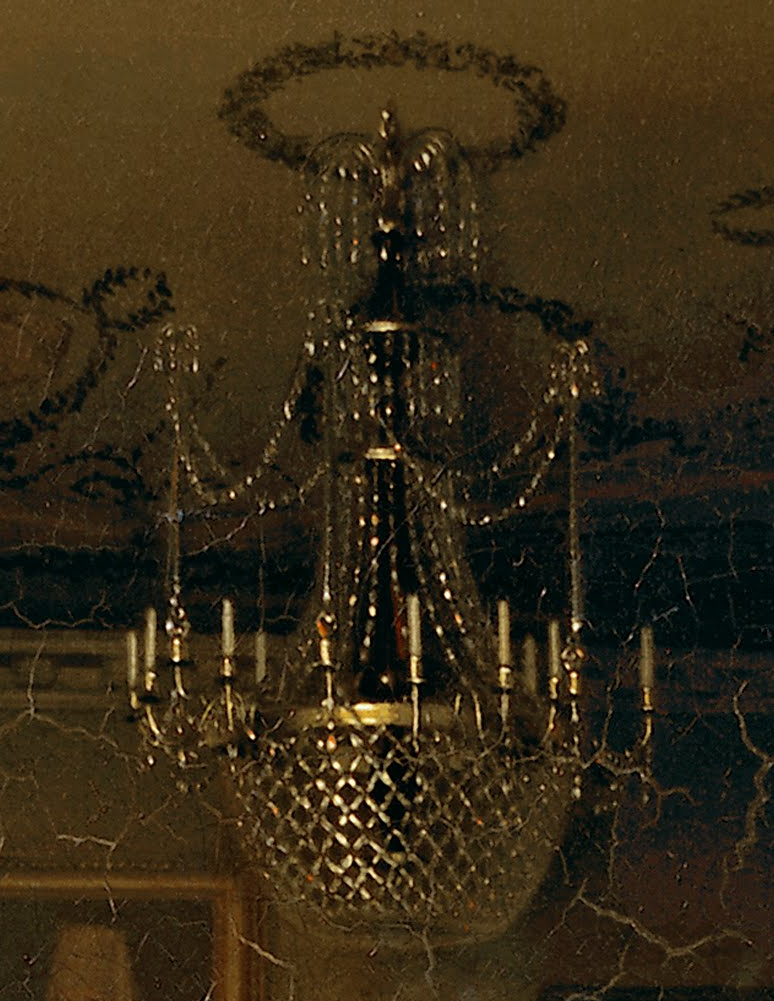
Chandelier (painting's detail)

In the mid-19th century, unequal marriages between impoverished nobles and wealthy merchants' daughters were common, despite the condemnation of secular society. Such convenience marriages, as well as the matchmaking associated with them, were repeatedly described in Russian literature of the 1830s and 1840s. In particular, Nikolai Gogol wrote in the story "Nevsky Prospekt": "There are officers who form a certain middle class of St. Petersburg society... In the upper class they are very rare, or rather never... Many of them, who teach in state institutions or prepare for state institutions, end up with a convertible and a couple of horses. Then their circle widens; they end up marrying a merchant's daughter who can play the piano, with a hundred thousand or so in cash and a bunch of fraternal relatives". Such a marriage could be seen as beneficial for both parties: the officer would receive a dowry that could be used to improve his financial situation, and the merchant would have the opportunity to be related to the nobleman and thus rise in the eyes of society.

The canvas depicts the interior of a rich merchant's house, open to the viewer like the space of a theater stage. Fedotov builds the composition of the painting in such a way that the viewer, as if observing the action from that side of the living room where the windows are, "involuntarily creates the feeling that we have inadvertently looked through the window and caught the owners of the house in a form not intended for the outsider's eye". On the right, in the doorway, stands the Major, brought by the matchmaker to ask for the hand of the merchant's daughter. Judging by the nature of the scene, the negotiations with the bride's parents had been conducted in advance by the matchmaker, and we see the future bridegroom's first visit to the merchant's house, where he is awaited with great impatience. Despite the fact that the guest's arrival has been expected, the room is in turmoil —the last preparations for the meeting are being made. In the central group— the merchant's daughter (the future bride) and her mother, the merchant himself stands behind, in the corner of the room. The scene is full of movement — the daughter, frightened and confused, rushes away, as if surprised by the appearance of the bridegroom. To prevent her from running away, she is held by her dress by her mother. In the left part of the room there is a table with hors d'oeuvres at which there are three minor characters — the cook, who puts kulebyaka on the table, as well as the sitter with a bottle of wine and a stout woman, who sticks out of the door. There are eight characters in the painting.

All the actors in the comedy of marriage depicted in the painting are permeated by a single action. According to the art historian Dmitry Sarabianov, Fedotov "gathered everything into a common mechanism, as if he had "spun" the action from a single starting point and "launched" it in different directions, making his characters move and interact with each other. In order to fully reveal the essence of his characters, the artist invents a situation in which each character is in special conditions, far from everyday life. In "Major's marriage proposal," this situation "appears on the canvas in extraordinary concreteness," and the moment that Fedotov places at the center of the plot, "torn from the event that is taking place in time, is so definite, convincing, it is so unconditional that the whole situation is not perceived as fictitious, composed," but, on the contrary, "is perceived as a kind of reality.

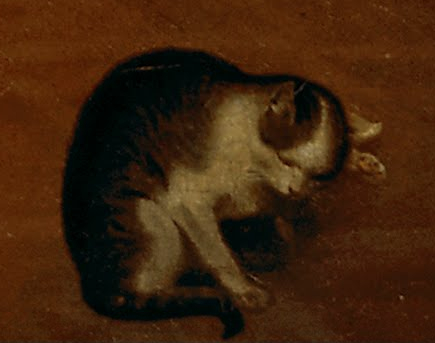
Cat (painting's detail)

Striving for a harmonious combination of all the elements of the picture, Fedotov carefully builds the composition using the classical principles of symmetry and balance. A very important role is played by the distribution of light, which is used to emphasize the figures of the main characters — the merchant's daughter and the Major. In the central, brightest part of the canvas are the bride and her mother. The bride's dress, lighter than her mother's, helps to distinguish her from the central group as the main character. The Major also attracts the viewer's attention because his figure is contrajour, i.e. against the light, but at the same time his head is turned to the left, illuminating his face. The atmosphere of the action is also influenced by the dominant color in the painting, which consists of various shades of warm brown. In addition, there are various shades of white in the color scheme, which "permeate the painting as if 'sewn through'". In addition to the sitters, Fedotov also used a previously acquired mannequin with movable joints, dressing it in the clothes of various characters and giving it the required poses.

The artist pays great attention to the details of the furnishings — they show many characteristic features of the merchant's life. The room is filled with things that show the owners' desire to live "in the capital", but at the same time the "wrong" combination of various objects reveals patriarchal habits and creates a comic effect: for example, the dining table is not covered with a white tablecloth, but with a pink one with stitching on the edges. The piety of the owners is evidenced by the Psalter and the Bible on the table to the left, as well as icons with lamps on a shelf. The ceiling, from which hangs a huge chandelier, is painted with garlands of flowers, nymphs and cupids. There are crystal girandoles on a dresser and a tray with a bottle of champagne and glasses on a chair. On the walls there are paintings, among them a lithograph with a view of the Nikolo-Ugreshskaya Convent, portraits of the Metropolitan (according to different versions, either the Metropolitan of St. Petersburg —Seraph, or the Metropolitan of Moscow— Philaret), Generals Mikhail Kutuzov and Yakov Kulnev, Ataman Alexey Ilovaysky on horseback, as well as the owner of the house with a book in his hand to emphasize his literacy. On the floor there is a cat "washing" the guests.

=== Characters ===
At the right edge of the canvas, in the open doorway, is the figure of the Major. Unlike the other figures, he is practically motionless, except for the fact that he twirls his moustache with one hand. The Major's dark silhouette is depicted against the light, so that it is devoid of dimensionality and "confronts the reality of being other volumes in the concrete space of the interior". The officer appears in a uniform with epaulettes, carrying a saber and a tricorne. He does not yet see what is happening in the room where the main action is taking place and is waiting for an invitation to enter. The image of the Major is described by Fedotov in his Racea as follows: "And now look, / How in another corner, / The hawk is threatening the duckling, / How the Major, fat and brave, / With a hole in his pocket, / Twists his mustache: / 'I, say, I'll get to the money!'" Despite the fact that the artist called the Major "fat," "his figure is taut, eyes slightly squinted, in the mustache hides a victorious grin — he clearly expects a favorable outcome of the upcoming "battle"". It is believed that the image of the Major was given to the artist relatively easily — taking into account his creative experience and observations made during a ten-year service in the Life Guards of the Finnish Regiment. To create the figure of Major Fedotov posed a familiar officer, and the face he wrote from himself, "looking in the mirror, giving himself just a minute of some smugness and something to adjust his features".

To the left of the Major is a matchmaker woman, who has already entered the room. Her image is a link between the Major, to whom her hand is moving, and the merchant, to whom her gaze is directed. This position corresponds to her role as "an intermediary in the realization of the transaction between the merchant and the major". The matchmaker is dressed in an elegant brocade coat and a dark skirt, with a dark scarf tied on her head in a small flower. She is not young and seems to be quite experienced in her business, though in the circle of strangers. Fedotov describes the matchmaker in his Racea as follows: "And here you will see: / As on the right retired village spinster, / Pankratievna-the matchmaker, / Unconscionable liar/ a thick one dressed in a brocade coat, / Goes with a report, / That, say, the bridegroom is welcome".

Fragments of the painting Major's marriage proposal

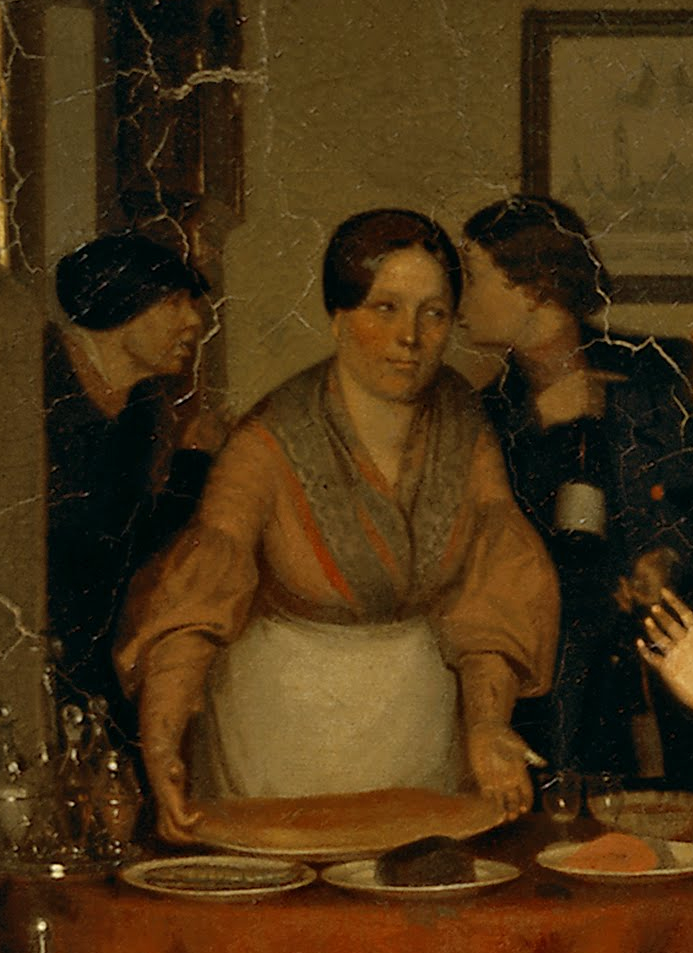
A housekeeper, a cook and a sitter

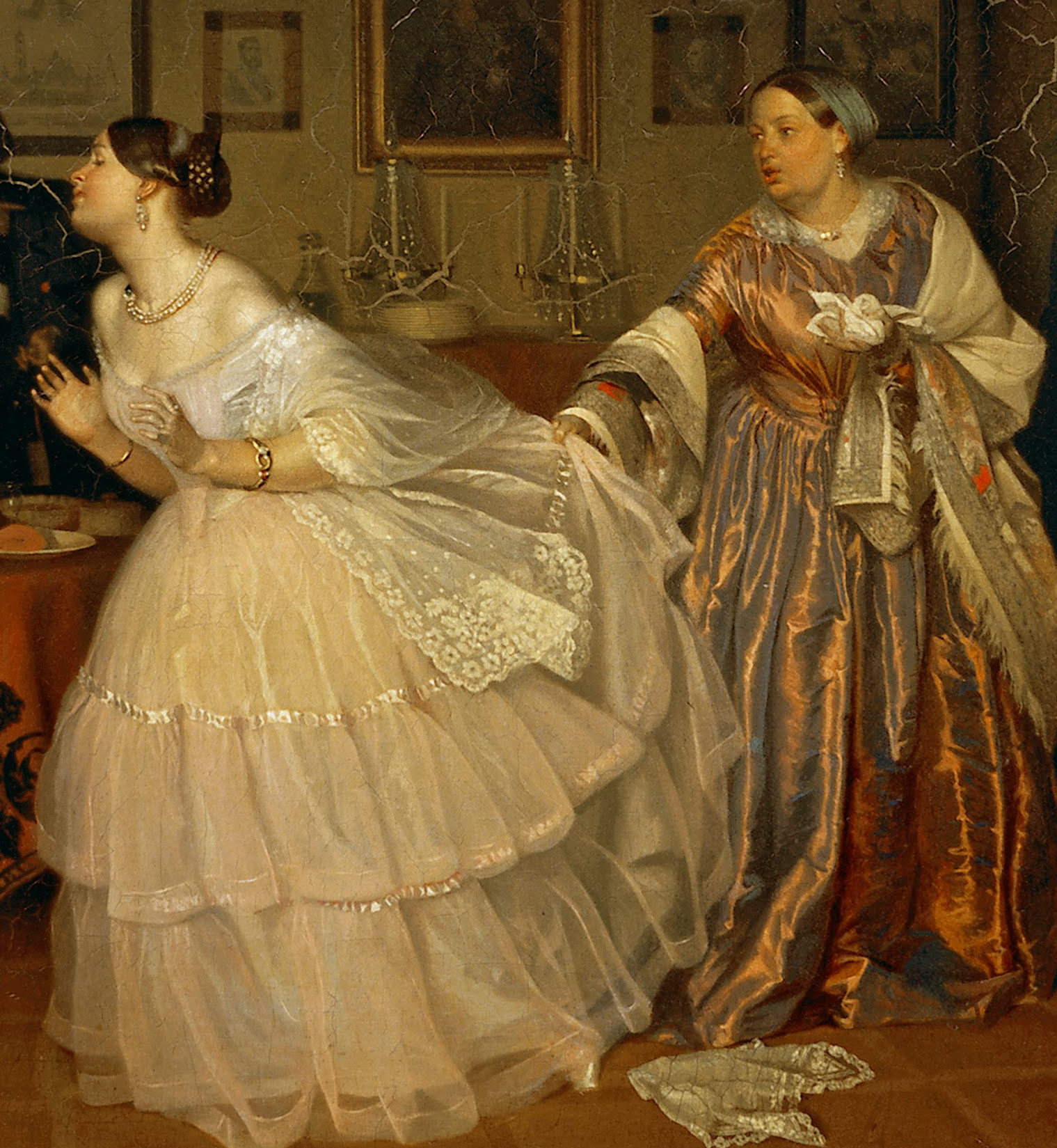
Merchant's daughter and a merchantess

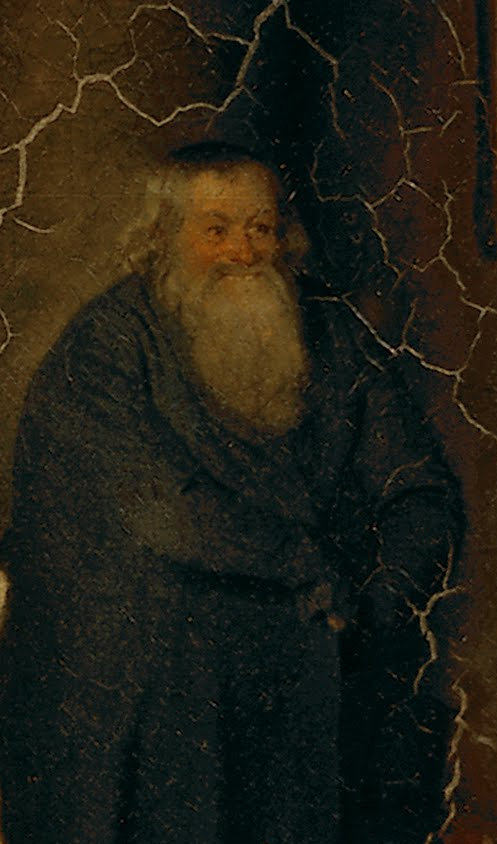
Merchant

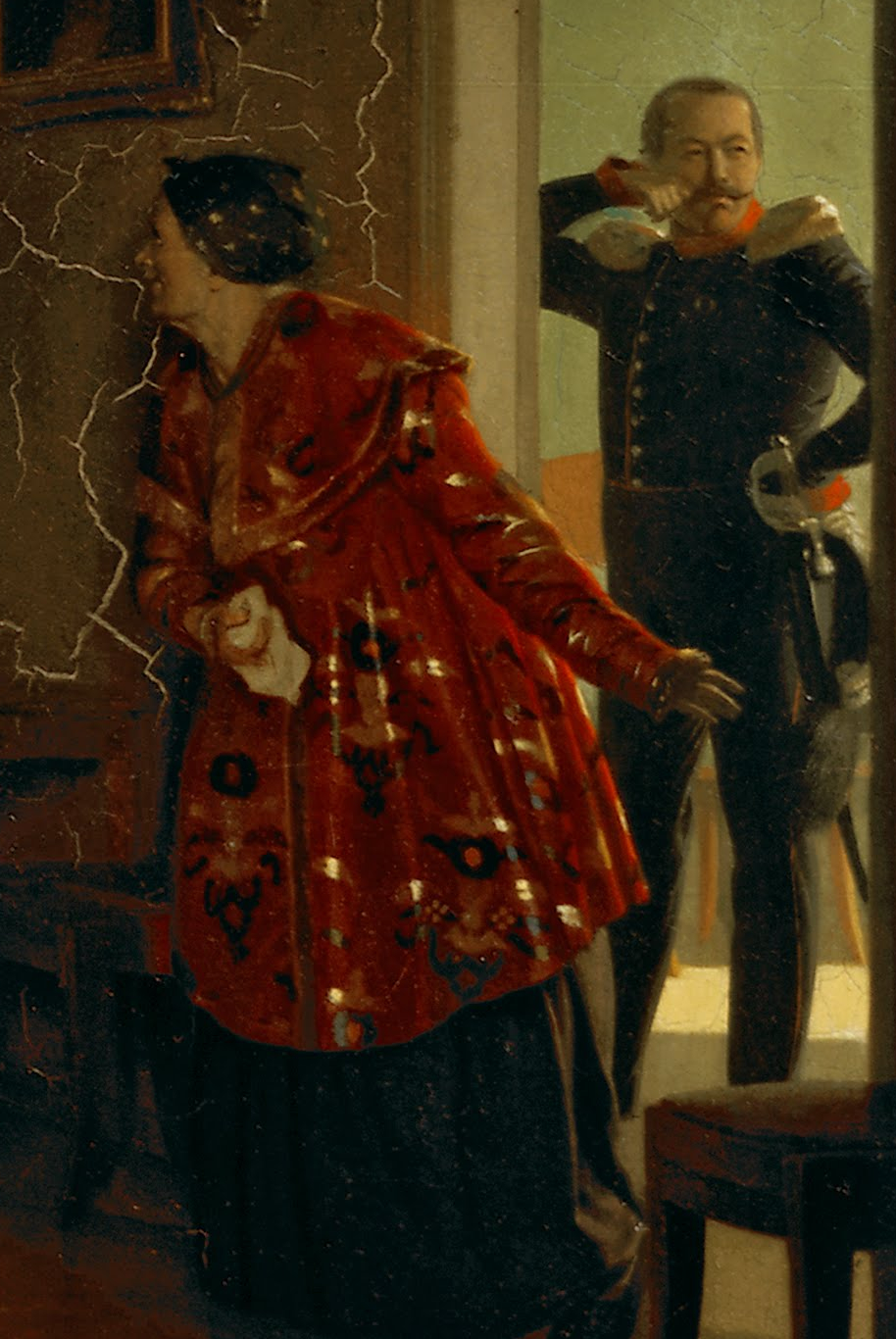
Matchmaker and Major

The merchant, a stocky man with an oaky beard, stands in the shadows in a corner of the room. The father of the family is dressed in the urban way, in a long and baggy coat, which he tries to button, hurrying and tangling in the sleeves. In his poetic description, Fedotov wrote: "As a merchant owner, / The bride's father, / Does not get along with the coat, / He is more familiar with other clothes; / How he beats, puffs, / Buttoning in a hurry; / Naspashku take — disrespectful". The image of a merchant did not come to the artist's mind for a long time, and during his walks in the Apraksin and Great Gostiny Dvor he persistently searched for a suitable type. Finally, in the area of the Anichkov Bridge, he found "a living embodiment of the character formed in his creative imagination". According to the artist himself, he met the realization of his ideal, "and no lucky man who was assigned the most pleasant rendezvous could not be more pleased with his beauty than I was with my red beard and fat belly".

In the center of the canvas are the main characters of the painting — the merchant and the merchant's daughter. They are brightly illuminated, "like the actors on a stage on whom the attention of the audience should be focused". The most colorful figure of the mother is "plump, but with the remains of former beauty in her face. She shows the imperious habits of the true mistress of the merchant's house — she embodies the fortress of the world that she protects, she is "like a rock that will be shattered by any worldly storm". The merchant is dressed in an elegant silk dress of iridescent fabric like "shanzhan", and on her shoulders is thrown an expensive shawl with a beautiful pattern. But there is a certain inconsistency in her outfit with the tradition accepted at that time for married ladies: she does not have a bonnet on her head, but a rustically tied village shawl. In his poetic description, Fedotov discusses this moment in detail: "Only the merchant's mistress / Didn't find a bonnet on her head. / The old-fashioned way — in a blue kerchief. / The rest of the outfit is borrowed from a Frenchwoman, / Only in the evening for her and her daughter".

The image of the merchant's daughter (often called as bride) is more complex than that of her mother. She has confusing feelings. On the one hand, she feels very uncomfortable in her new dress — mainly because of the huge neckline that exposes her shoulders and breasts; according to Fedotov's description in the race: "Ay, ay, ay, ay! — What a shame!...! / And here there is nothing to hide her shoulders: / The scarf is so squeaky — / All through, in plain sight!...! / No, I'd better go to my room!". The absurdity of the situation is emphasized by the fact that the merchant's daughter's outfit is intended for a ball or other evening event, and not for meeting the groom, which takes place during the day in the family circle; in addition, she is unaccustomed to the immense amount of gold jewelry — rings, necklaces, earrings, bracelets. On the other hand, "in her pose, in the gesture of her outstretched arms, in the expression of her capricious face, one can sense a tokenism, a naïveté, an insincerity. Perhaps she wants to be a major, but she is afraid to meet the bridegroom — "Like our bride / She will not find a place: / "A man! A stranger! / Oh, what a shame! / I have never been with them...". The merchant's daughter tries to run away into another room (the chamber), but her movement is thwarted by her mother, who grabs her by the hem of her dress. Judging by the fact that Fedotov placed the merchant's hand holding her daughter by the hem almost in the middle of the canvas, he gave this detail great importance. Fedotov made the sketch of the bride's head from a woman he knew, he used a mannequin to paint her figure, and he also used the services of his friend Karl Karlovich Flug (great-grandfather of the artist Ilya Glazunov), who agreed to pose in a woman's dress.

At the left edge of the painting are minor characters — a cook putting a freshly baked coulibiac on the table, a sitter with a bottle of wine that he has apparently brought from a wine shop, and an old woman looking curiously out of the next room. The sitter (an employee who represents the owner of the shop in his absence) is a young man dressed in a merchant's kaftan, his hair brushed straight. Holding a bottle of wine in his hands, he turns to the housekeeper standing outside the door, apparently explaining to her what is going on in the house. The image of the housekeeper —an old woman in a povoyniki— was introduced by the artist to show the everyday life of a merchant family, "with a bunch of housekeepers and distant relatives hanging around the house like disembodied shadows". Fedotov drew the figures of the sitter and the housekeepers from the regulars of the Tolkuchy and St. Andrew's markets, and the cook from the servants of the Flugov family whom he knew. Art historian Galina Leontieva believes that the cook in "Major's marriage proposal" is a positive image of a common woman, because she — the only one of all the characters in the picture - understands the baseness of the transaction in the marriage comedy that is being played out before her.

== The artist's reproduction from the Russian Museum ==
In 1850, two years after painting the first version of "Major's marriage proposal", Pavel Fedotov began work on the second version. This version, completed in 1852, is now in the State Russian Museum in St. Petersburg (canvas, oil on canvas, 56×76 cm, inv. Zh-4521). The plot and the arrangement of the characters are generally preserved, as in the first version, the second version features the same eight actors and a cat. Nevertheless, the version in the Russian Museum has a number of significant differences from the painting in the Tretyakov Gallery, according to art historian Galina Leontieva, in the new version "Fedotov makes such serious changes in the solution of the idea that there are reasons to see here the beginning of a new stage in the development of the artist's creative method". These changes concern the composition of the picture, the characters depicted in it, and the details of the setting.

Compared to the first version of the painting, Fedotov's second version is stricter in the selection of details. In particular, the second version lacks the chandelier, which played an important role in the composition. Apparently, the artist felt that "its size distracted attention, and its position exactly in the center of the canvas broke the painting in half and disturbed the integrity of the perception of the whole scene. In addition, in the second version, the figural brackets where the wall of the room joins the ceiling were removed, as well as the intricate paintings on the ceiling depicting flowers. Other things are also missing: the intricate pattern on the tablecloth has disappeared, the paintings hanging on the wall are less detailed, etc. Fedotov tries to remove the secondary details that overload the story in order to focus the audience's attention on the main thing and to give the situation portrayed in the picture more poignancy.

Fragments of the painting Major's marriage proposal

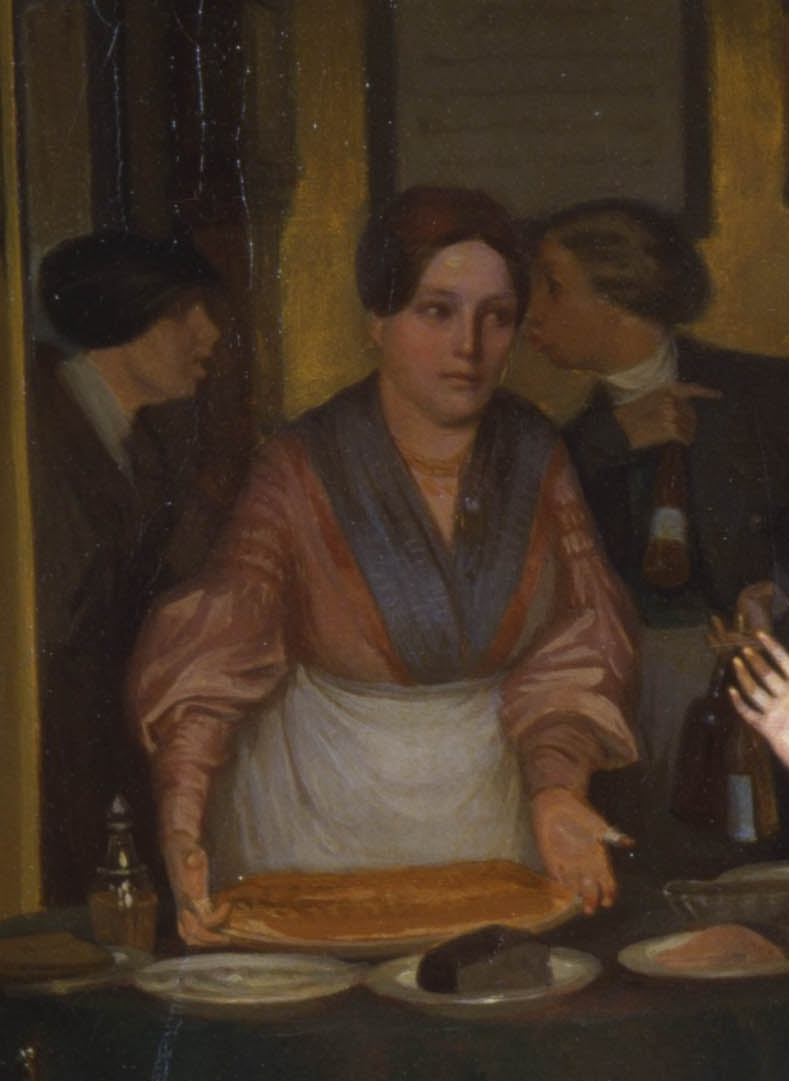
A housekeeper, a cook and a sitter

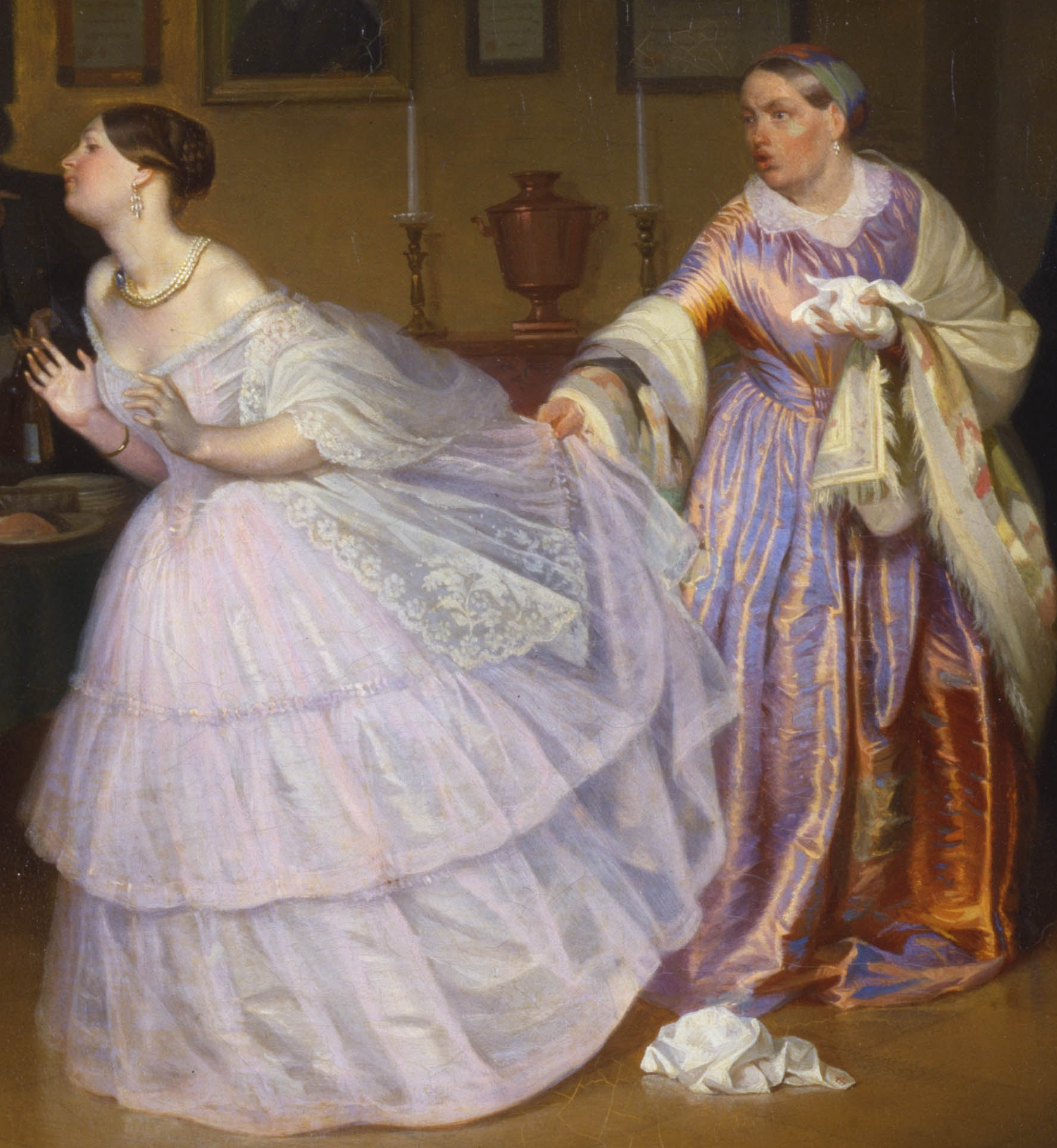
Merchant's daughter and a merchantess

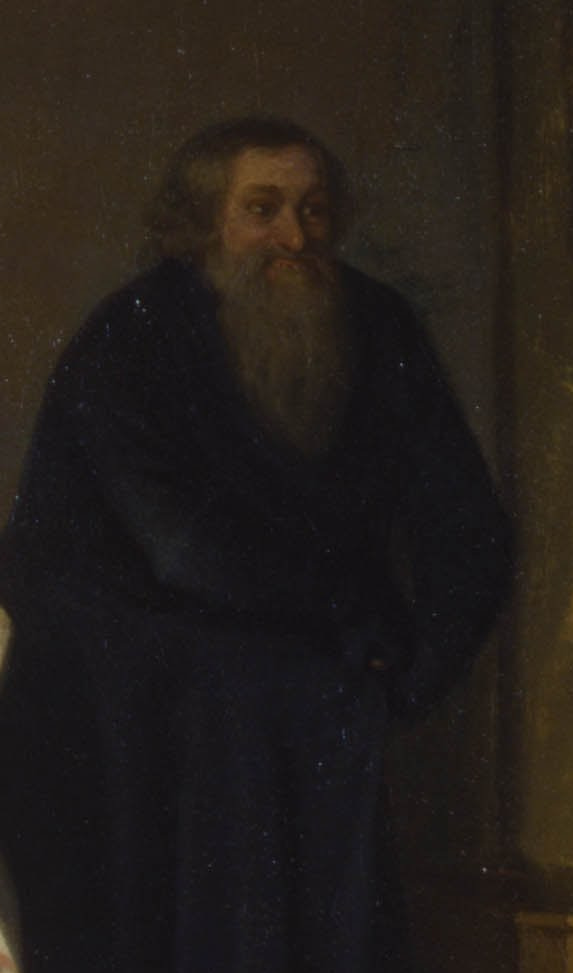
Merchant

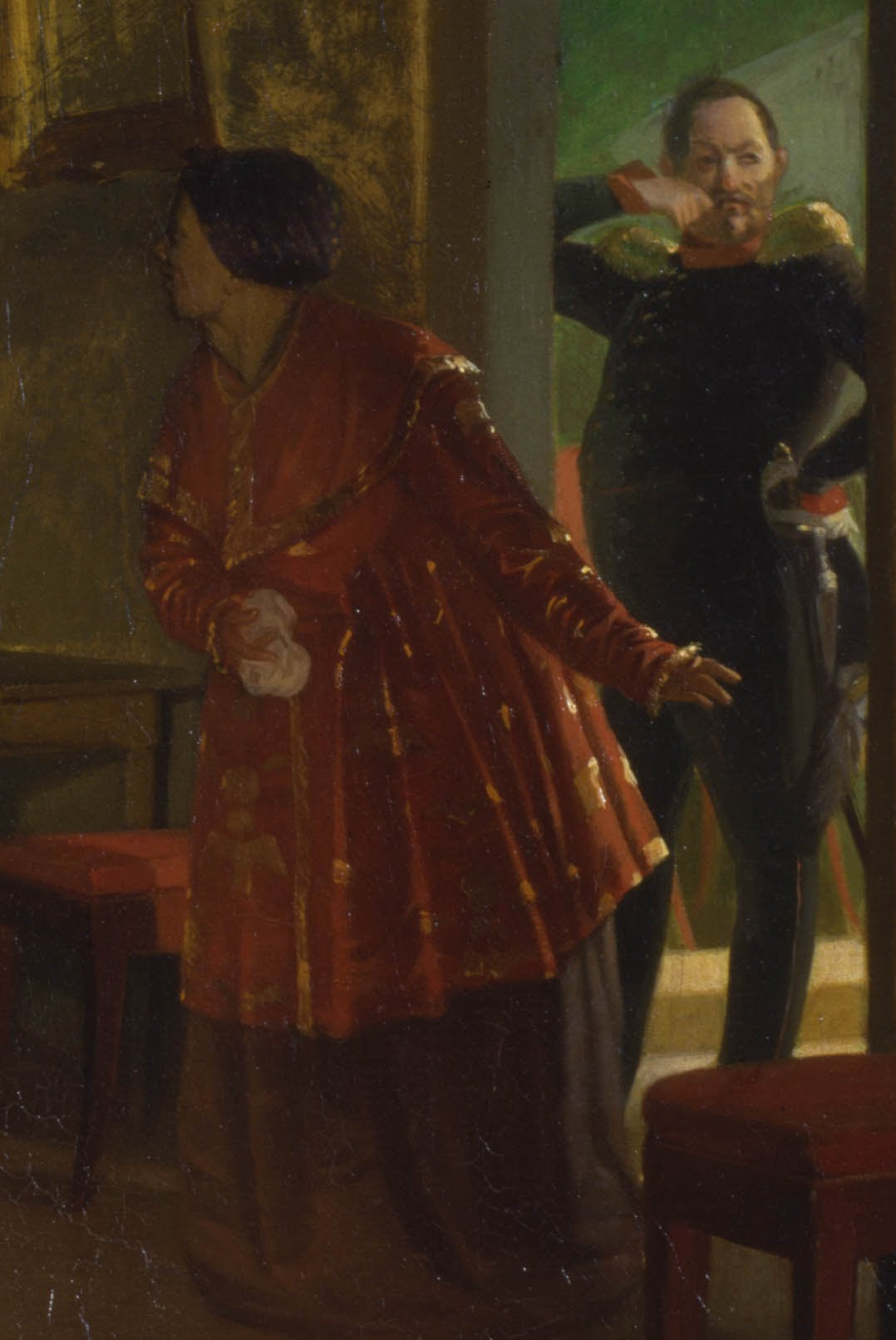
Matchmaker and Major

The outward appearance of the Major has changed a lot: if in the first version he looked relatively slender, brave and not without a certain attractiveness, in the second version his posture becomes arrogant, his figure becomes ridiculous —with a belly and thin legs, his face has changed— his forehead has become narrower, there are bags under his eyes. The image of the merchant's daughter (bride) also underwent significant changes. In the first version, the artist caricatured her — stupid, capricious and clumsy, causing ridicule. In the second version, "soft femininity, even a certain grace, appears in her", so that "instead of a somewhat caricatured personification of vulgar bourgeoisie, stupidity — before us there is a living person", causing the viewer not contempt, but even some sympathy. The figure of the merchant, which in the first version was set against the background of a round stove, is in the second version set against the lighter background of a rectangular stove and is perceived a little closer to the foreground. The sitter's face, partially hidden by the cook's head in the first version, is completely exposed in the second.

The change in accent in the images of the Major and the Bride also changes the perception of the situation depicted by the artist. In the first version of the painting, both characters —the major and the bride— evoked an ironic attitude in the viewer, while in the second version, where the major appears as a more negative character, there is sympathy for the merchant's daughter and concern for her fate. As a result, "the scene went from being purely caricatured to being filled with dramatic sarcasm".

== Studies, sketches and reproductions ==
In the process of creating the painting "Major's marriage proposal" Fedotov did a lot of preparatory work. This is evidenced by dozens of surviving sketches and studies, which the artist used to determine the composition of the scene, the figures of the actors, as well as their poses and mutual position in the plane of the canvas. In particular, Fedotov worked a lot on the image of the merchant, long and carefully searching for a way to depict the fidgety gesture of his hands while trying to cope with an unfamiliar coat. The artist also created many variants of the face and figure of the merchant's daughter, changing the gestures of her hands, the tilt of her head, and her facial features — until he was able to "express most clearly in her appearance, the way she holds those feelings that she has at the moment — token excitement, the desire to show her shyness and modesty". Significant work in his sketches Fedotov spent a lot of work on the image of the merchant to achieve "accurate readability in facial expressions of her state of mind" — in the final version "the viewer can hear the word 'fool'", which she says to her daughter, trying to escape from the groom major. With the major himself there were apparently fewer problems, thanks to Fedotov's rich observations of life during his military service. There are also sketches of minor characters: a cook, a sitter, and a domestic. In particular, one of these sketches depicts an old lady-in-waiting, and separately — her mouth with rare teeth.

Studies and sketches for Major's marriage proposal

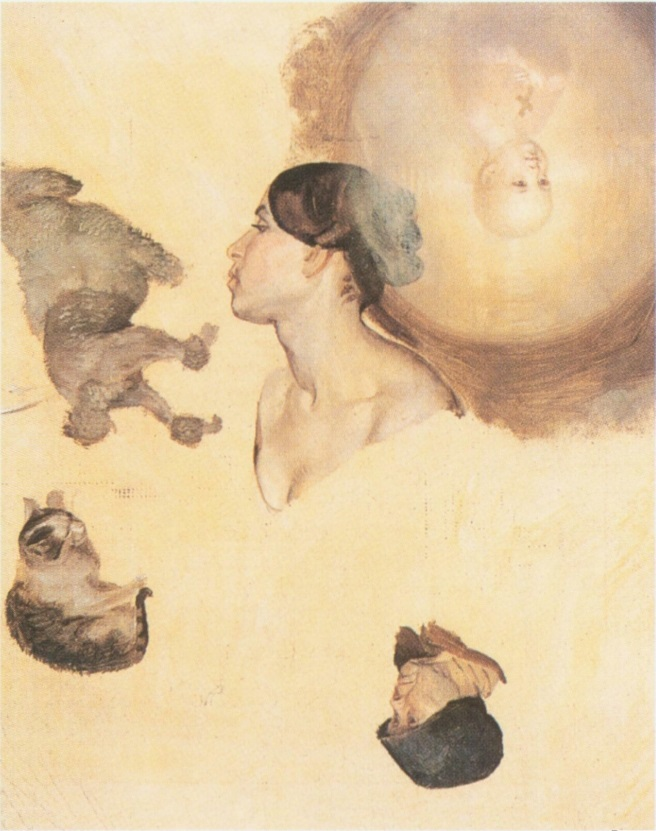
Bride's head. Old woman's head. Cat

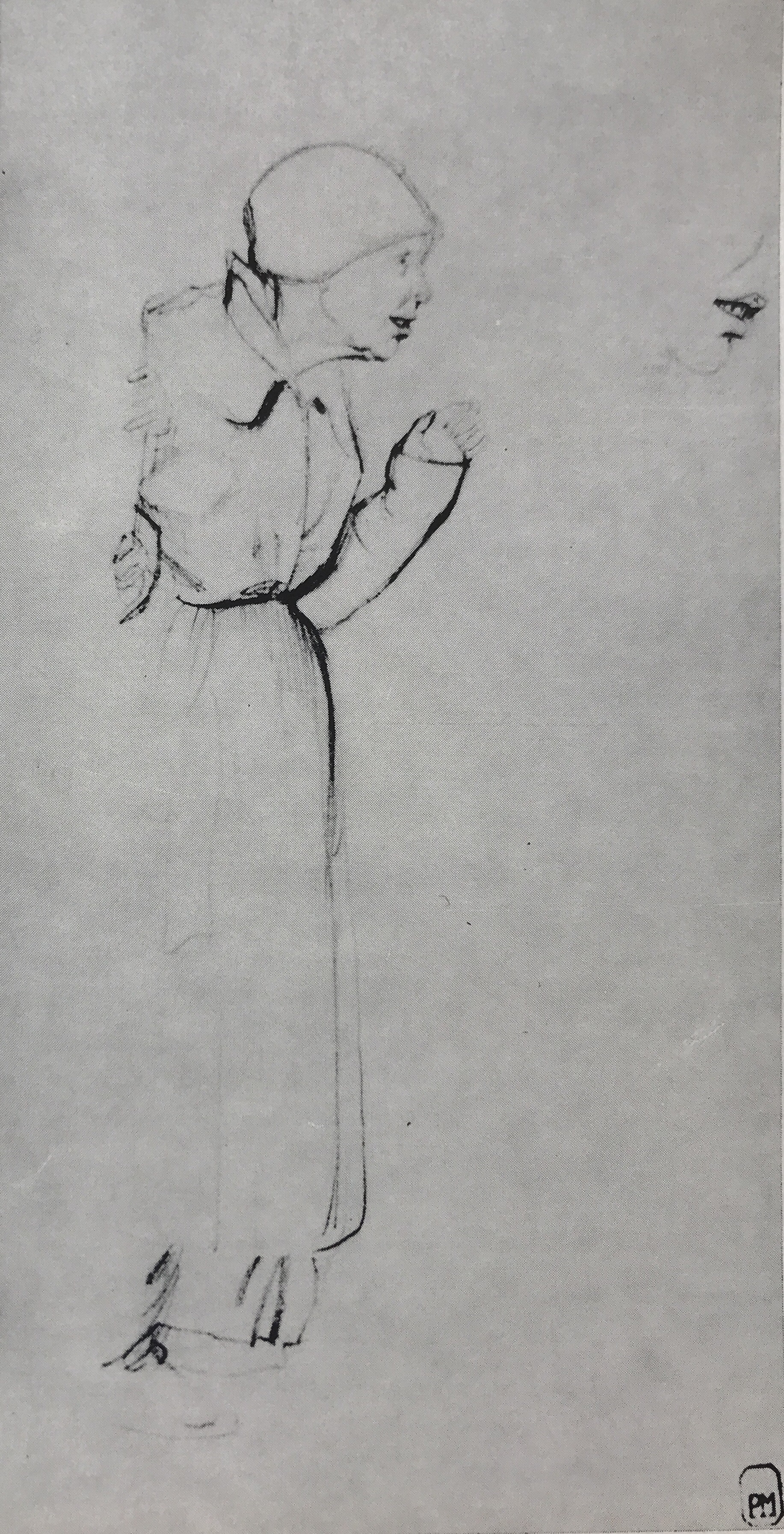
Housekeeper

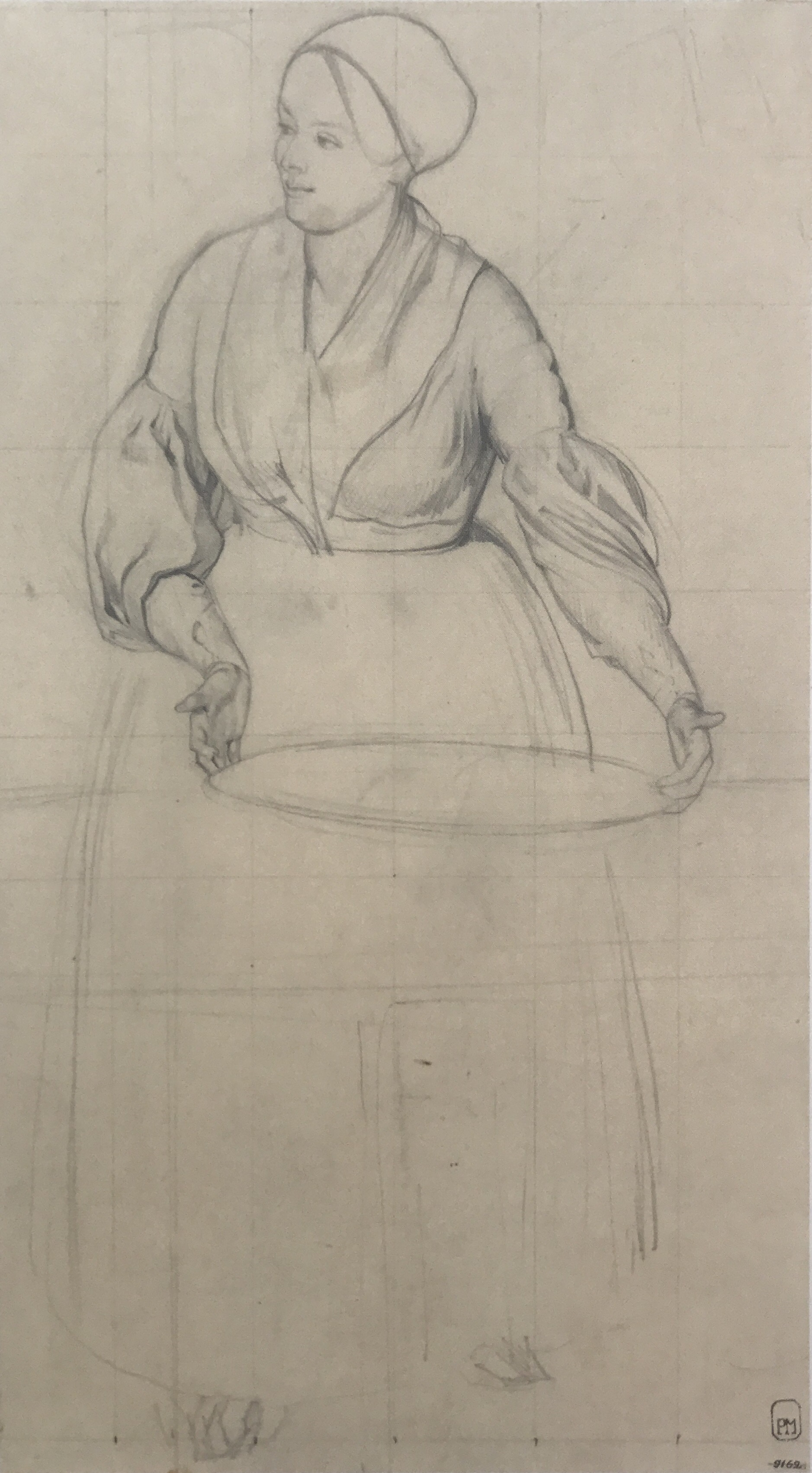
Cook with a dish

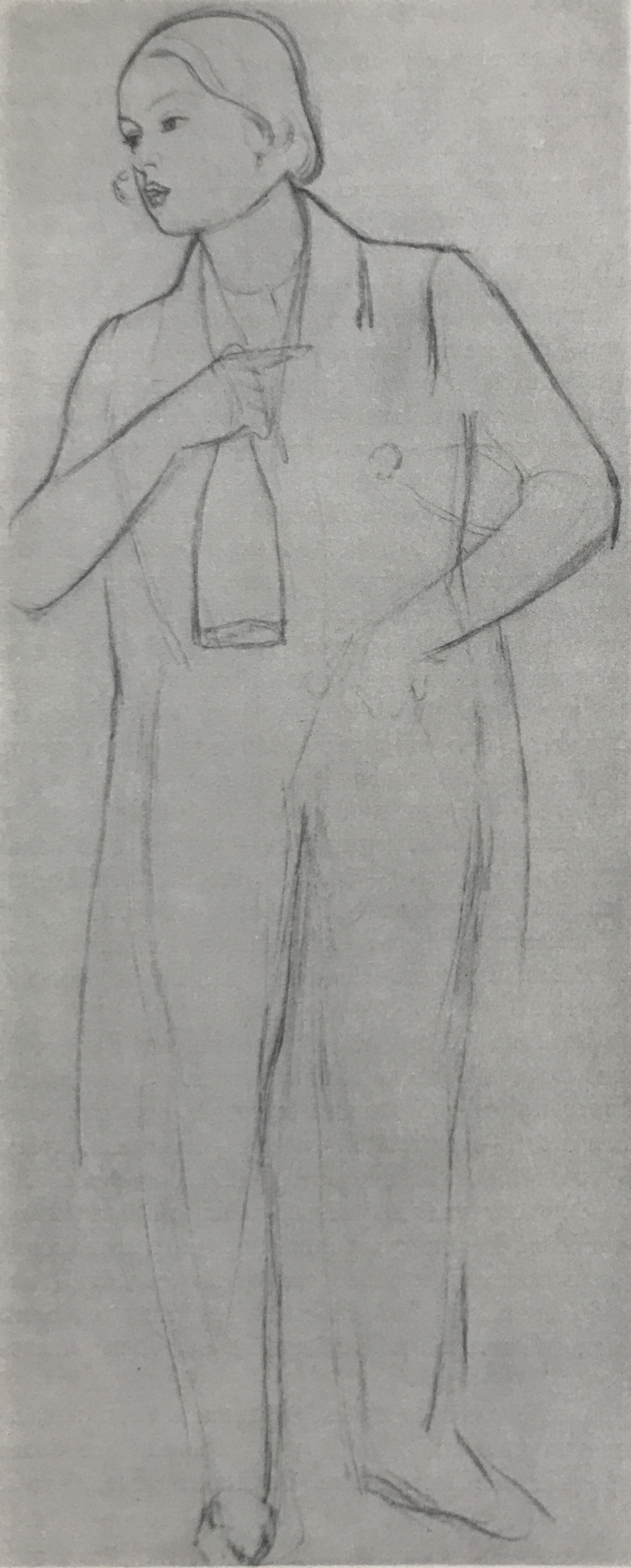
A sitter with a bottle

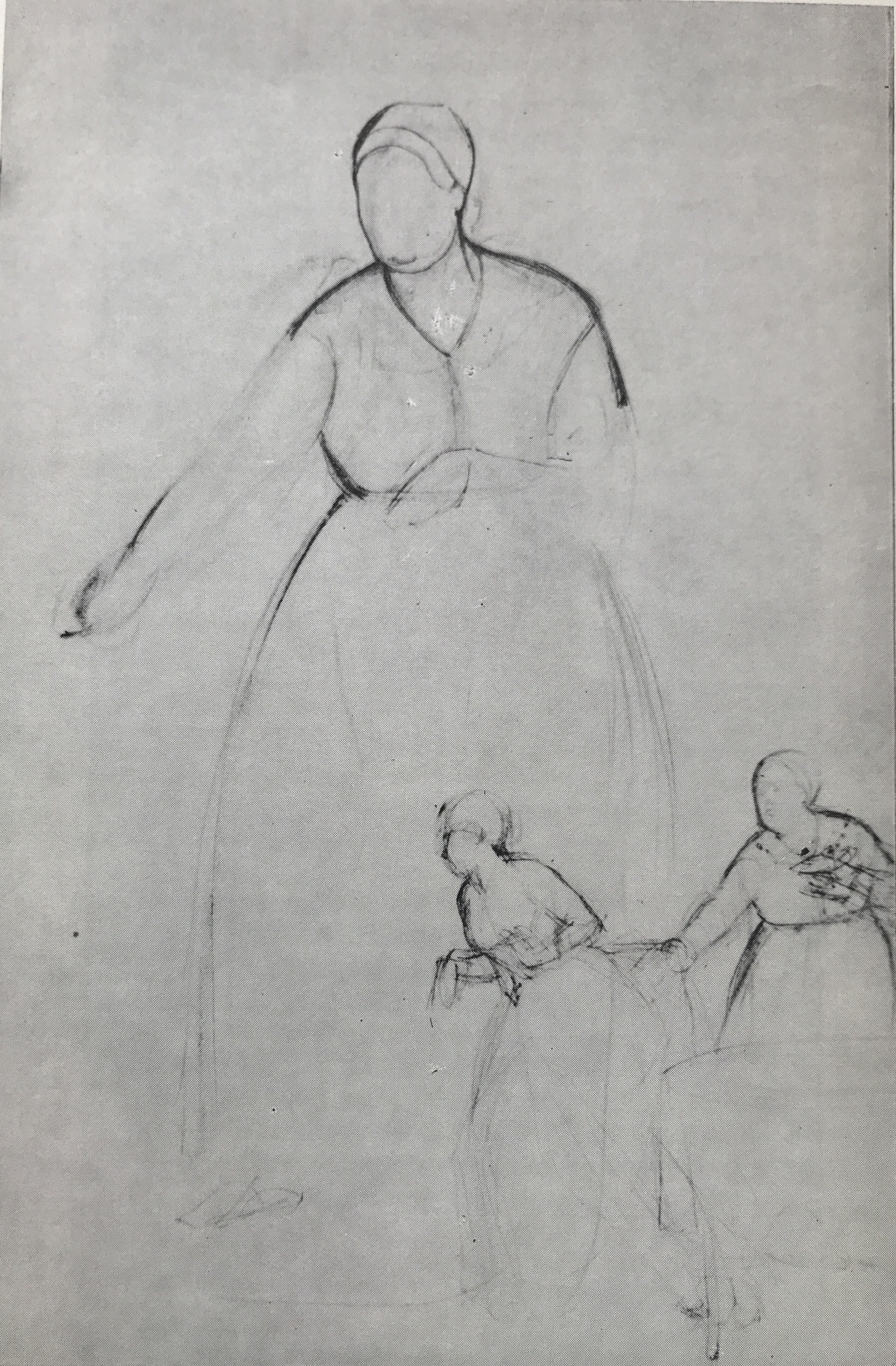
Sketches for the images of mother and daughter

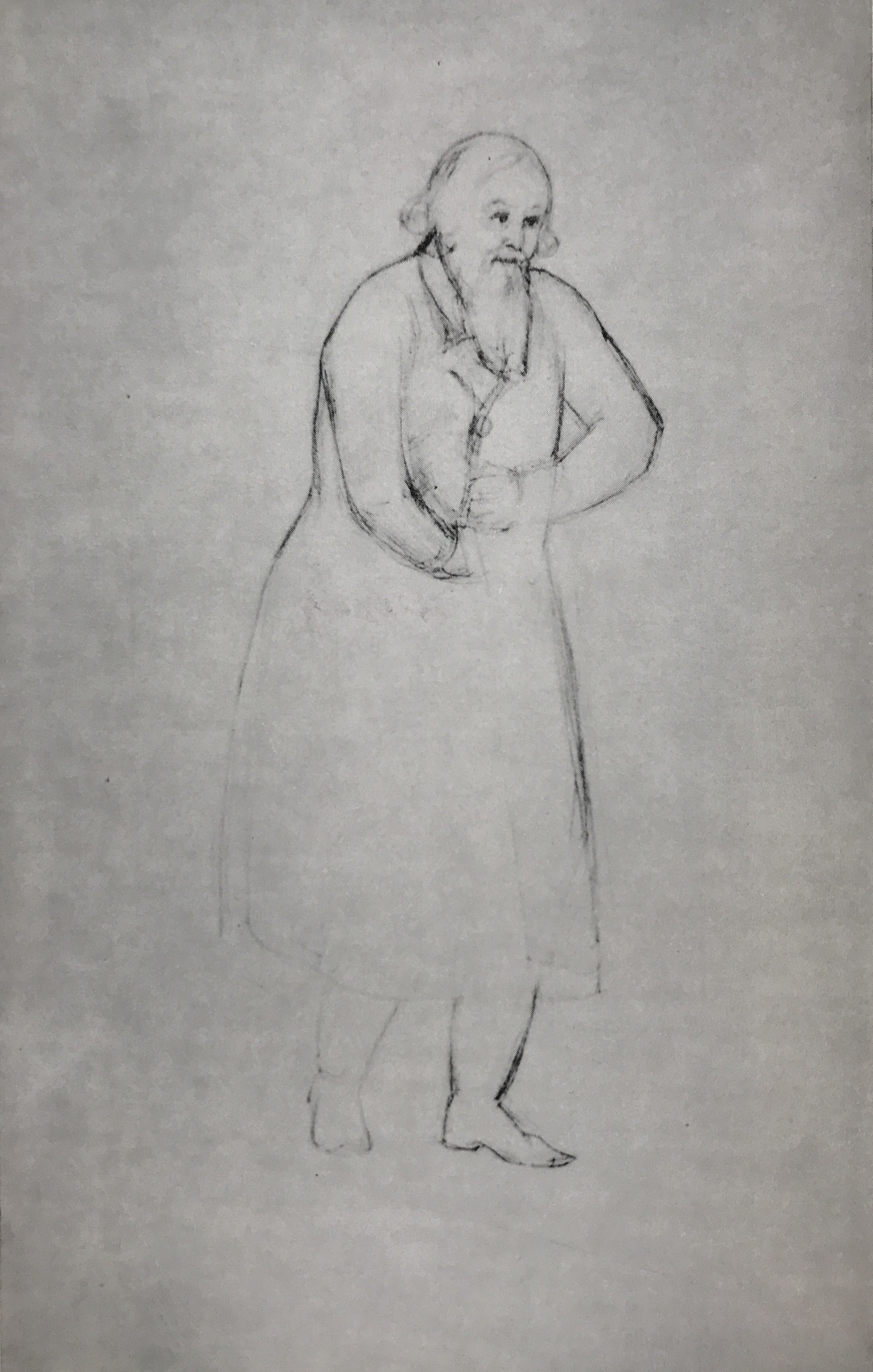
Sketch for the figure of a merchant

Of the pictorial sketches is known canvas from the collection of the State Russian Museum, which depicts several details at once: "The head of the bride. Head of an old woman. Cat" (canvas, oil, 34,5×29 cm, inv. Zh-3816; the same canvas shows sketches unrelated to "Matchmaking Major", "Child with a Crux" and "Poodle").

There are also known copies of "The Matchmaking Major" by other 19th-century artists. One such copy, painted by an unknown artist, is in the Kyiv Museum of Russian Art. There was another copy in the collection of the State Tretyakov Gallery, painted by Apollon Mokritsky. In 1929 it was transferred to the Dnipro Art Museum, in 1941 it was exhibited at Fedotov's personal exhibition in the State Russian Museum in Leningrad, and its traces were lost afterward.

== Reviews ==
Art critic Vladimir Stasov, in the article "Twenty-five Years of Russian Art", published in 1883, spoke about his acquaintance with Pavel Fedotov "in the best, strongest period of his life, in those years when he wrote" Matchmaking Major". Stasov noted that Fedotov, while creating the paintings "The Fresh Cavalier" and "Major's marriage proposal", "suddenly touched such deep notes that no one before him had ever touched in Russian art". Commenting on the painting "Major's marriage proposal", which appeared at the exhibition in 1849, Stasov wrote that, despite the apparent amusement of the characters depicted in it, it was a struggle of two hostile camps trying to deceive each other — "tragedy peeping menacingly from behind a cheerful and amusing outer screen".

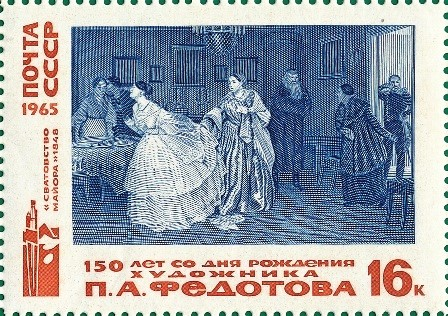
Painting "Major's marriage proposal" on a 1965 USSR postage stamp

In his memoirs about Fedotov, the art historian Andrei Somov told about the great interest of the public in "The Dating of the Major" and other paintings of the artist, exhibited at the academic exhibition in 1849. He wrote that these paintings "depicted scenes completely taken from real life, full of profound thoughts and healthy humor, interesting both for art connoisseurs and for the profane. In Somov's opinion, it was these qualities that distinguished Fedotov's paintings from the many more "boring" works by artists-academics presented at the exhibition.

Art historian Galina Leontieva wrote that Fedotov, who worked long and painstakingly on the painting "Matchmaking Major", managed to create "one of the remarkable works of Russian painting of the first half of the 19th century", which "due to the amazing truth of the characters, the significance of the problem raised in it turned out to be much more serious than the original idea of the artist". Leontieva noted that the problems raised by Fedotov in this work go much further than the denunciation of the "Comedy of Marriage". The artist raises a number of very relevant for that period of issues related to the alleged mesalliance — marriage of a young, ruined major on the merchant's daughter.

Art historian Dmitry Sarabianov wrote that the canvas "Major's marriage proposal" is "one of the highest achievements of Fedotov in the field of fine art". In his opinion, in this picture the artist managed with great skill to organize not only the composition, but also the color. He noted the harmonious coloristic structure of the picture, as well as the soft coloring, which allows to create a color unity, but at the same time gives the opportunity to "extract beauty from each color quality, as if it were taken separately". According to Sarabianov, in this work by Fedotov, light and color act as a means of "poetic realization of reality".

== Bibliography ==
- Алленов, М. М. (2000). Федотов (in Russian). М.: Белый город. p. 48. ISBN 5-7793-0256-1.
- Булгаков, Ф. И. (1893). Павел Андреевич Федотов и его произведения, художественные и литературные (in Russian). СПб.: Типография А. С. Суворина. p. 48.
- Бенуа, А. Н. (1995). История русской живописи в XIX веке (in Russian). М.: Республика. p. 448. ISBN 5-250-02524-2.
- Гордеева, М. (2011). Павел Андреевич Федотов. Великие художники (in Russian). Vol. 82. М.: Директ-Медиа и Комсомольская правда. p. 48. ISBN 978-5-7475-0117-1.
- Греков, В. (1913). Федотов Павел Андреевич // Русский биографический словарь: Яблоновский — Фомин (in Russian). Vol. 25. СПб.: типография Главного управления уделов. pp. 228–234.
- Дитерихс, Л. К. (1893). П. А. Федотов. Его жизнь и художественная деятельность (in Russian). СПб.: Типография Ю. Н. Эрлиха. p. 78.
- Кирсанова, Р. М. (2006). Павел Андреевич Федотов. Комментарий к живописному тексту. Очерки визуальности (in Russian). М.: Новое литературное обозрение. p. 78. ISBN 5-86793-431-4.
- Кузнецов, Э. Д. (1990). Павел Федотов. Очерки визуальности (in Russian). Л.: Искусство, Ленинградское отделение. p. 330. ISBN 5-210-00314-0.
- Леонтьева, Г. К. (1962). Павел Андреевич Федотов. Основные проблемы творчества (in Russian). М.: Искусство. p. 200.
- Леонтьева, Г. К. (1985). Картина П. А. Федотова «Сватовство майора» (in Russian). Л.: Художник РСФСР. p. 56.
- Новиков, В. С. (2015). Илья Глазунов. Русский гений. Лучшие биографии (in Russian). М.: Litres. p. 350. ISBN 978-5-699-37511-0.
- Петинова, Е. Ф. (2001). Русские художники XVIII — начала XX века (in Russian). СПб.: Аврора. p. 345. ISBN 978-5-7300-0714-7.
- Сарабьянов, Д. В. (1969). Федотов (in Russian). М.: Изобразительное искусство. p. 296.
- Сарабьянов, Д. В. (1990). Федотов. Русские живописцы XIX века (in Russian). М.: Художник РСФСР. p. 176. ISBN 5-7370-0213-6.
- Стасов, В. В. (1952). Избранные сочинения: живопись, скульптура, музыка (in Russian). Vol. 2. М.: Искусство. p. 176.
- Степанова, С. С. (2016). Павел Федотов. «Сватовство майора». История одного шедевра (in Russian). Vol. 2. М.: Государственная Третьяковская галерея. p. 36. ISBN 978-5-89580-138-3.
- Государственная Третьяковская галерея — каталог собрания / Я. В. Брук, Л. И. Иовлева. — М.: СканРус, 2005. — V. 3: Живопись первой половины XIX века. — 484 p. — ISBN 5-93221-081-8.
- Государственный Русский музей — Живопись, XVIII — начало XX века (каталог). — Л.: Аврора и Искусство, 1980. — 448 p.
- Государственный Русский музей — каталог собрания / Г. Н. Голдовский. — СПб.: Palace Editions, 2007. — V. 3: Живопись первой половины XIX века (К—Я). — 272 p. — ISBN 978-5-93332-263-4.
- Павел Федотов. К 175-летию со дня рождения. Каталог / М. Н. Шумова. — СПб.: Седа-С, 1993. — 280 p. — ISBN 5-85973-005-5.
