= Pavel Fedotov =

Russian artist (1815–1852)

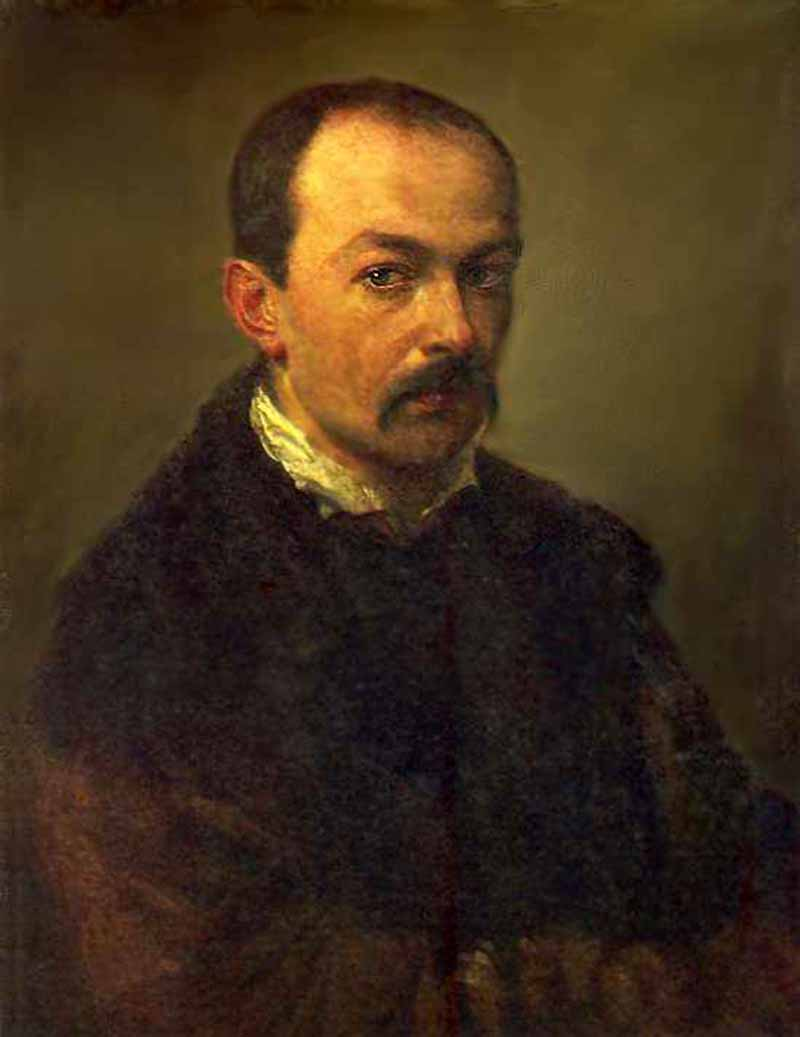
Self-portrait (1848)

Pavel Andreyevich Fedotov (Russian: Павел Андреевич Федотов; 4 July 1815 – 26 November 1852) was an amateur Russian painter. He was only 37 years old when he died in a mental clinic. He has been compared to William Hogarth.

== Biography ==
Fedotov was an officer of the Imperial Guards of Saint Petersburg. Like many of his colleagues of the time he was interested in arts. He played the flute and attended evening classes at the Academy of Fine Arts, where he focused on painting. As a student he was not particularly outstanding, yet, in the Army, he gained a reputation as a regiment painter through his portraits of officers and regiment scenes.

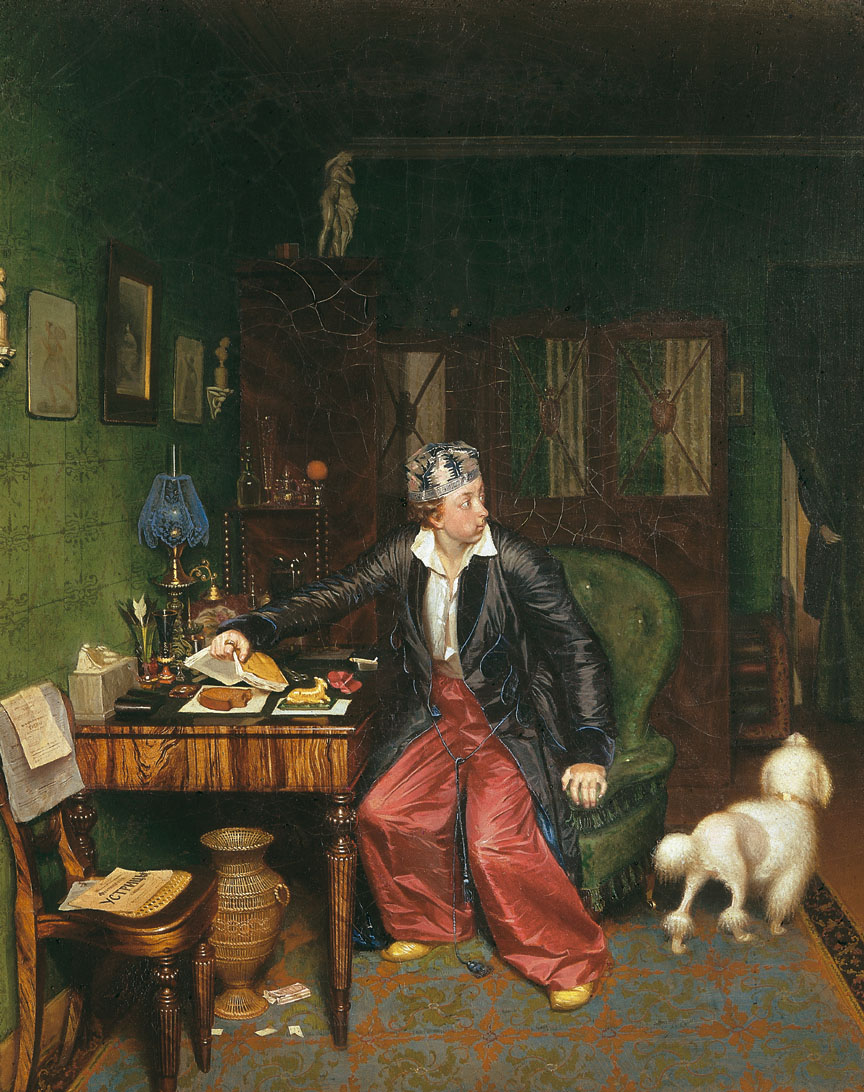
Breakfast of an Aristocrat

Although, what would equate to a notable career of the day, the idea of being a regiment painter did not appeal to Fedotov, who believed that a true creative artist should devote himself to art completely and so choosing to concentrate more fully on his painting, he retired himself from the army in 1844 and handed himself over to his artistry. Since his salary within the army was not insubstantial and having to support his family back in Moscow his future, now resting on his creative talents alone would have been somewhat daunting.

He initially used both pencil and watercolor to produce his works, though began to develop a more mature medium by changing to painting with oils in 1846.

Completing a number of pieces using the new medium, most notable the 'Newly Decorated', 'Picky Bride' and 'Untimely Guest' were full of the satire and critique surrounding the then current social and political order.

Fedotov's works were recognized as a new word in art at the exhibition of 1848 in St. Petersburg and brought the painter success that promised his prosperity and, hence, the possibility to continue his work. Perhaps the crowning achievement of his career was Major’s Marriage Proposal (1851) displaying the maturity with which Fedotov skill had developed.

Fedotov had connections with some of the members of the Petrashevsky social-democratic group who went on trial in 1849. This created some problems for him with the official censors. Sharing the fate of the many democratic-minded intelligentsia, Fedotov was affected by the restrictive political climate.

Before he died, Fedotov had produced his works imbued with a feeling of desperate sorrow gradually growing until it reached its climax in the Encore, Encore! (1851), Gamblers (1852), and Young Widow (1852).

=== Illness and death ===
Previous to 1852, Fedotov's behaviour was relatively normal, although he showed some signs of depression. He was withdrawn, suffered from headaches, and aged rapidly; his eyesight became worse.

In the spring of 1852, he started to exhibit significant psychological problems; there was also an unhappy love affair that contributed to his troubles. He started to spend money wildly, and offered to marry numerous women in Moscow at the same time. Eventually, his strange behaviour led to his arrest by police, after which he was put in a mental hospital. The illness progressed rapidly. The treatment was not very helpful—it included brutal corporal punishment. Some of his friends visited, and left some notes. He died in a mental clinic at the end of 1852.

== Peculiarities of artistic heritage ==
Pavel Fedotov is the founder of critical realism in Russian painting. There are two prevailing trends in his work. The first line is dominated by drawings and sketches, strongly influenced by Hogarth. His drawings are poorly developed and his aim is not to reproduce reality but to flaunt its common human weaknesses and faults, to ridicule the banal or obscure aspects of Russian morals.

The plot of these works is characterized by complexity and intricacy. Their main idea is underlined by adding side plots to the main scene. The artist makes accessories capable of intensifying the disclosure of the plot and sometimes overloads the entire composition with them. The predominant element of these works is a caricature.

Fedotov's works change in character and become less refined as he developed his technique. The ponderousness of the composition gradually gave way to simplicity and naturalness. The very idea underlying the composition became more and more serious and close to life.

Fedotov opened a new theme of nationality and satire, untouched by anyone else in Russian painting. He was the first artist to set an example of its successful development and left it as a legacy to subsequent talents.

== Works ==
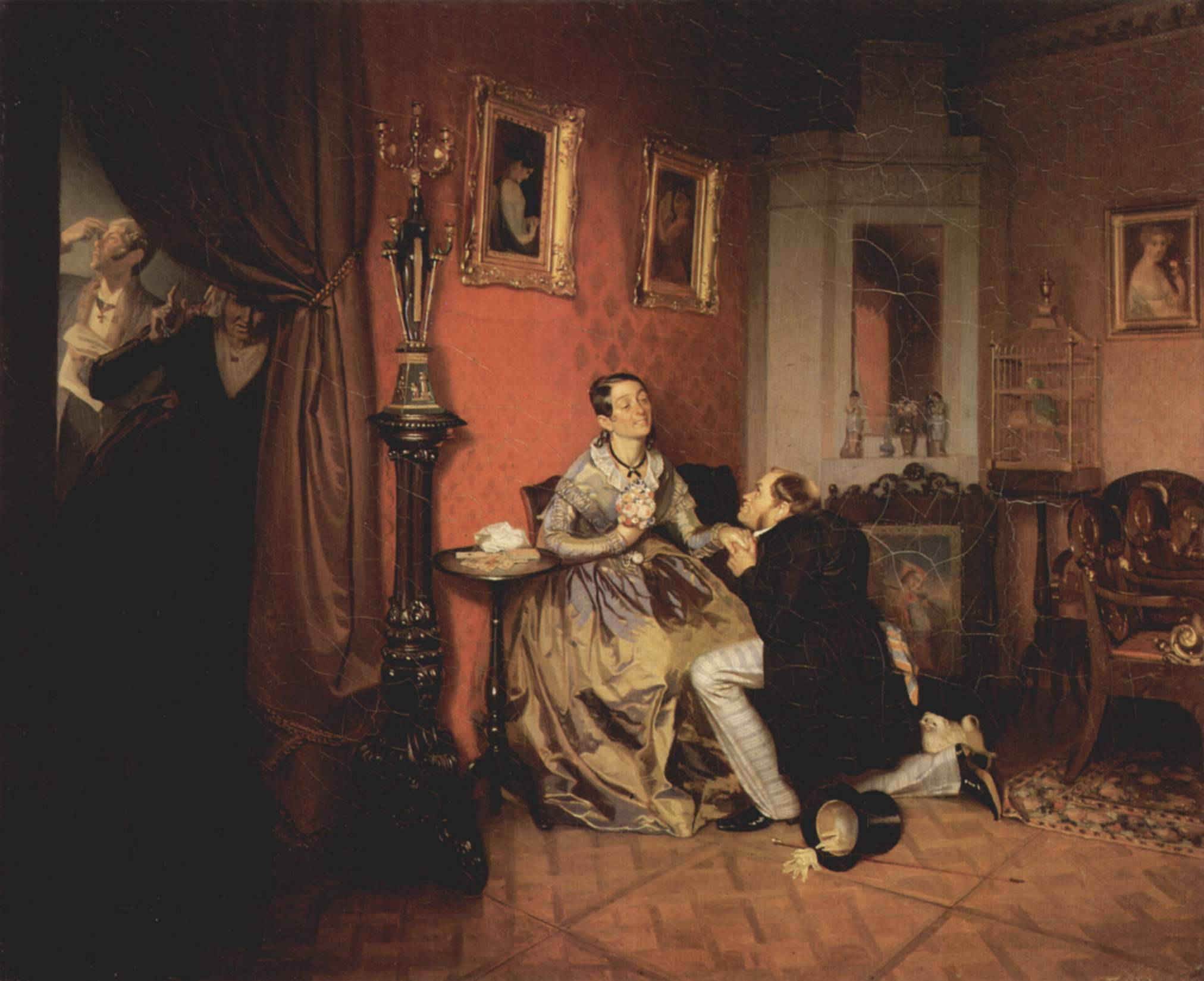
Difficult Bride

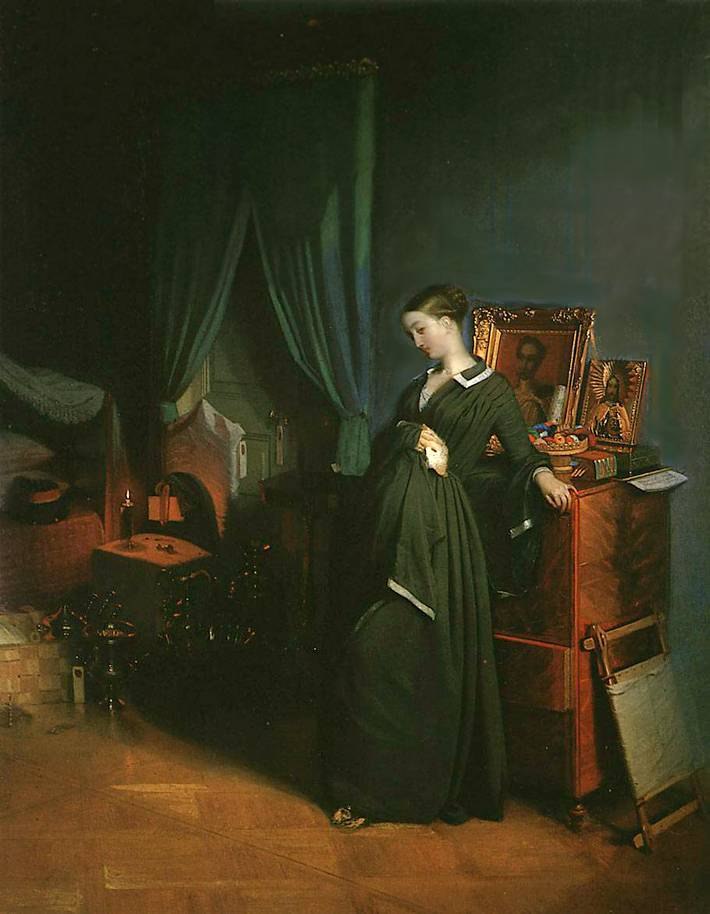
Young widow

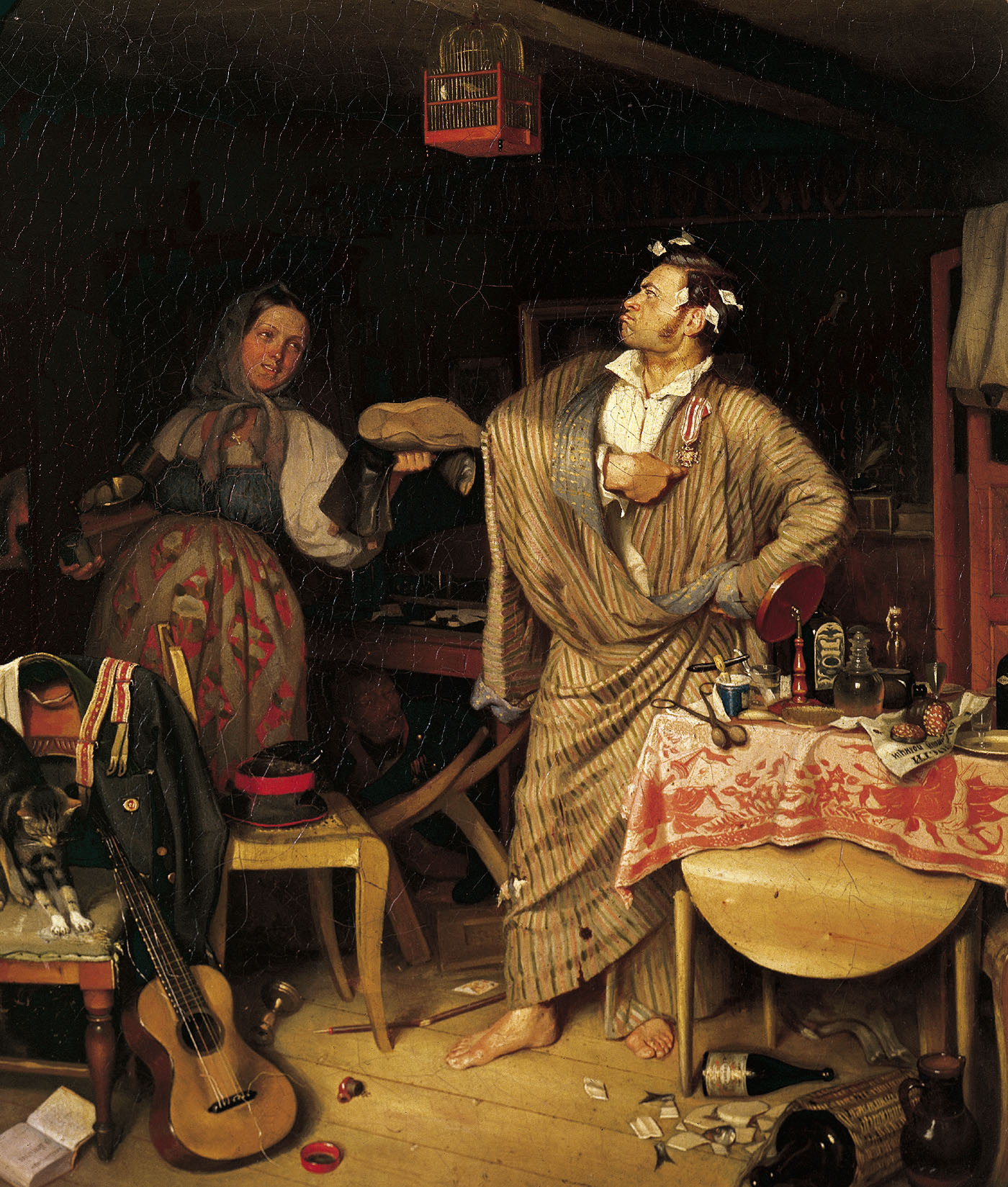
The New Cavalier

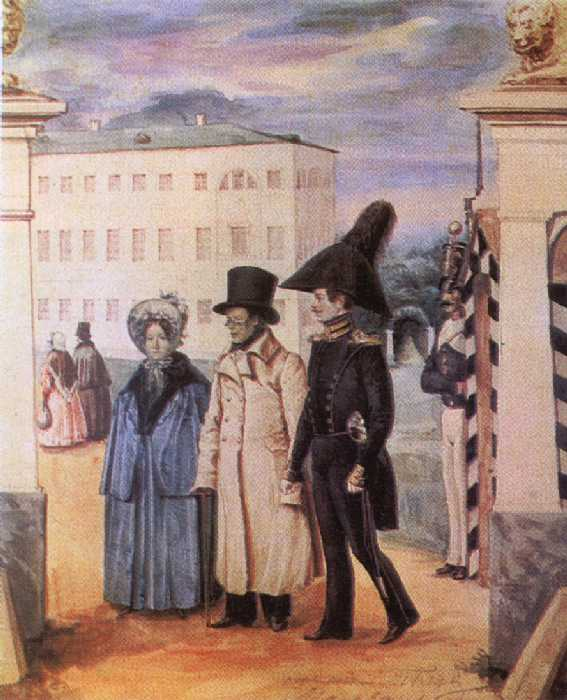
The Stroll (Fedotov, in uniform, with his father and half-sister)

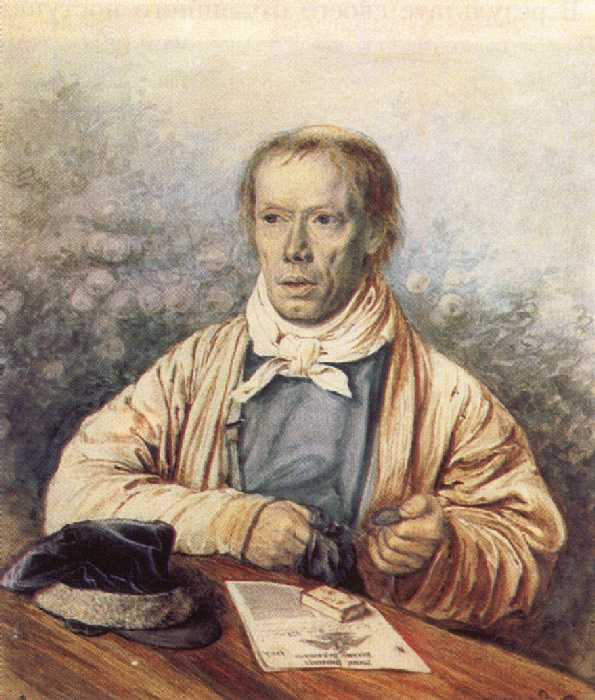
Portrait of the Artist's Father

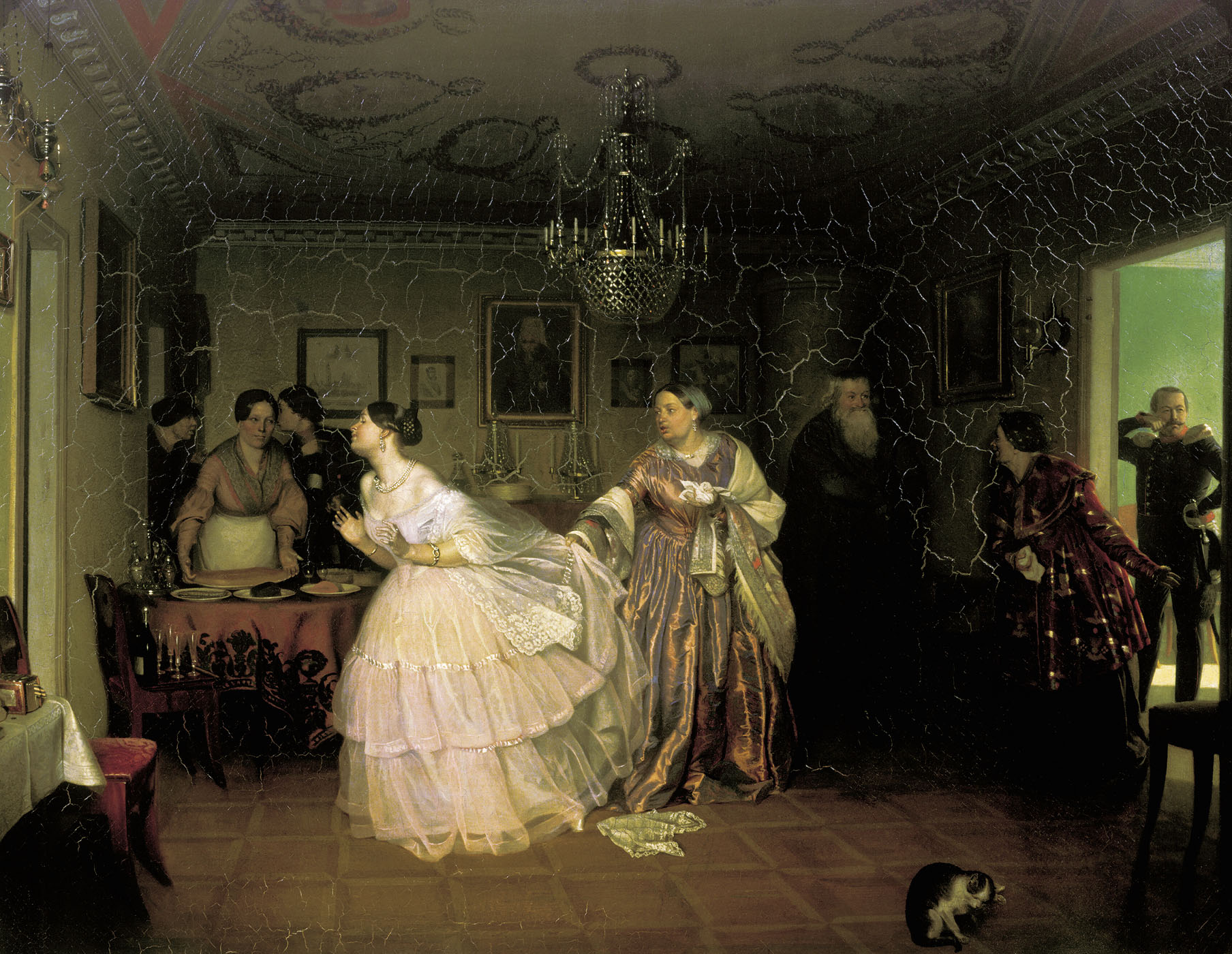
Major's Betrothal

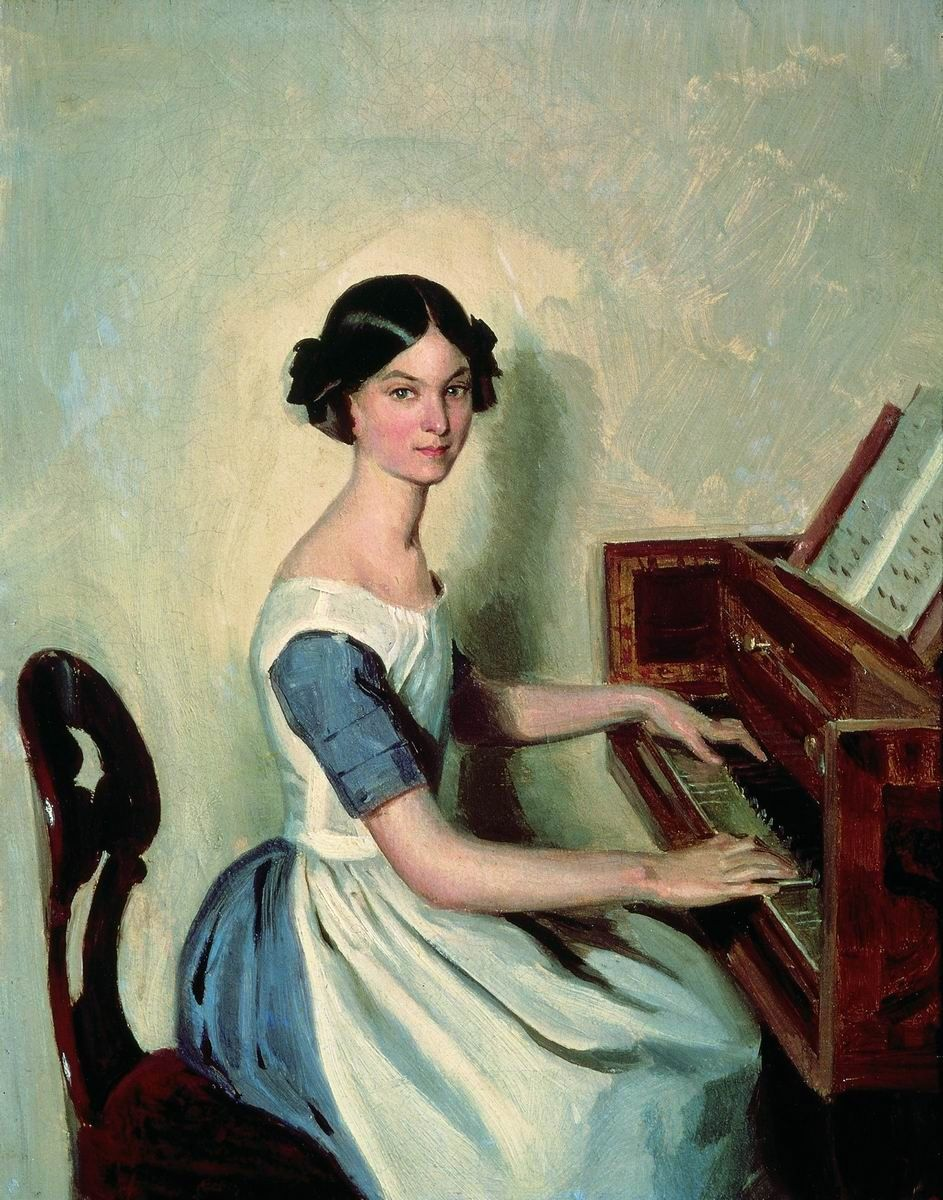
Portrait of N.P. Zhdanovich at the Harpsichord

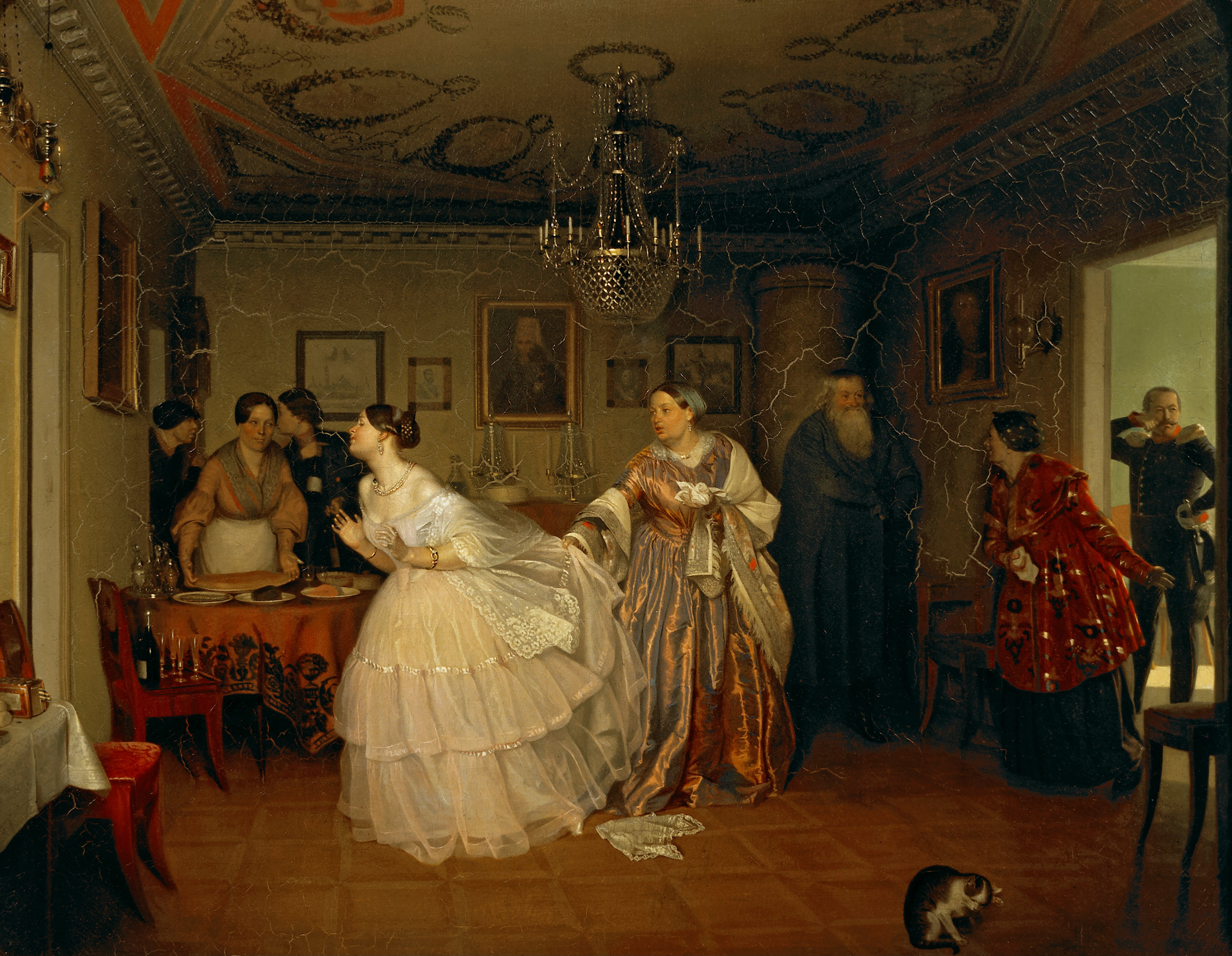
Major's marriage proposal
